= Karata-Tukita language =

Northeast Caucasian language

Karata
- К̄ӀирлӀе мац̄Ӏи k’ːirƛi mic’ːi
- Pronunciation: [k’ːirt͡ɬi mits’ːi]
- Native to: North Caucasus
- Region: Southern Dagestan
- Ethnicity: Karata
- Native speakers: 9,549 (2020 census)
- Language family: Northeast Caucasian: Avar–Andic; Andic; Akhvakh–Tindi; Karata–Tindi; Karata
- Dialects: Karata; Tukita

Language codes
- ISO 639-3: kpt
- Glottolog: kara1474
- ELP: Karata
- Karata

- Karata is classified as Definitely Endangered by the UNESCO Atlas of the World's Languages in Danger (2010)

Karata (кӏкӏирлӏи) is an Andic language of the Northeast Caucasian language family spoken in southern Dagestan, Russia by 9,549 Karata in 2020. There are ten towns in which the language is traditionally spoken: Karata, Anchix, Tukita, Rachabalda, Lower Inxelo, Mashtada, Archo, Chabakovo, Racitl, and formerly Siux. Speakers use Avar as their literary language.

== Dialects ==
The language has two dialects, Karata and Tukita, which slightly differ in phonetics and morphology but are mutually intelligible. Tukita is sometimes considered a separate language, on the basis of lexicostatistics. There are also four subdialects; Anchikh, Archi, Ratsitl and Rachabalda, named after their respective villages.

== Phonology ==
=== Consonants ===
Karata has 45 consonants.

Consonant phonemes of Karata
		Labial	Dental		Alveolar				Palatal	Velar		Uvular		Pharyn- geal	Glottal
		Labial	Dental		central		lateral		Palatal	Velar		Uvular		Pharyn- geal	Glottal
		Labial	lenis	fortis	lenis	fortis	lenis	fortis	Palatal	lenis	fortis	lenis	fortis	Pharyn- geal	Glottal
Nasal		m	n												
Plosive	voiced	b	d							ɡ					
Plosive	voiceless	p	t							k					ʔ
Plosive	ejective	(pʼ)	tʼ							kʼ					
Affricate	voiced				(d͡ʒ)										
Affricate	voiceless		t͡s	t͡sː	t͡ʃ	t͡ʃː		t͡ɬː			k͡xː		q͡χː		
Affricate	ejective		t͡sʼ	t͡sʼː	t͡ʃʼ	t͡ʃʼː	t͡ɬʼ	t͡ɬʼː			k͡xʼː		q͡χʼː		
Fricative	voiceless		s	sː	ʃ	ʃː	ɬ	ɬː	ç	x	xː			ʜ	h
Fricative	voiced	v	z		ʒ					ɣ				ʢ	
Trill					r										
Approximant							l		j						

- The glottal stop transcribed here is named rather ambiguously a "glottalic laryngeal" by the source.

=== Vowels ===
Karata has 18 vowels.
