= Tukita dialect =

Northeast Caucasian dialect

Tukita
- Tokita, Tokitin
- Native to: North Caucasus
- Region: Southern Dagestan
- Ethnicity: Karata
- Native speakers: 1,500
- Language family: Northeast Caucasian: Avar–Andic; Andic; Akhvakh–Tindi; Karata–Tindi; Karata; Tukita
- Writing system: Cyrillic

Language codes
- ISO 639-3: –
- Glottolog: toki1238

The Tukita dialect is a dialect of the Karata language, common in the villages of Tukita in the Akhvakhsky District and Tukita in the Khasavyurtovsky District of the Republic of Dagestan. It has significant differences in phonetics, morphology and vocabulary with the proper Karata dialect.

== Linguistic characteristics ==
There are noticeable differences in the vocabulary (For example, Tukita гьерса, Karata лълъерсса, Russian "река", English "river", as well as Tukita гьангъу, Karata гьанда, Russian "холм, курган", English "hill, mound").

In the Tuktitan dialect, the formation of numerals is vigesimal, in contrast to decimal in Karatin proper. In cardinal numerals, the particle -да is absent (Tukita кlекlи, Karata кlеда, Russian "два", English "two"). The formation of the names of tens is also different.

There are differences in pronominal adverbs (Tukita гьуди, Karata вудугу, Russian "там (вдали, по горизонтали)", English "there (far away, horizontally)").

The formant of the dative case in the Tukita dialect is отцу, which coincides with the Akhvakh language ("иму лъа" — "отцу" - "to the father").

The weak ejective lateral afrikata [кьl] is absent. Tukita has a dorsal spirant [г], which is a variant of Karatin [хь]. The spirant [хь] itself is significantly palatalized. The palatalized consonants [г], [к], [кь] are represented.

In the dialect, the affixes of personal pronouns and the vowel of the stem change ("мен" - "ты" - you, "мини" - "тебя" - "you").

The dialect is influenced by the Avar language.
