= Godoberi =

Godoberi or Ghodoberi may refer to:

- Godoberi people: A people of the Caucasus in southwestern Dagestan, Russia
- Godoberi language: Their Avar–Andic language
- Godoberi, Botlikhsky District, Republic of Dagestan: The village where most of them live.
