= Ingerdakh =

Ingerdakh Ингердах Ингердахъ
- Selo
- Location within Republic of Dagestan Location within Russia
- Coordinates: 42°35′N 46°23′E
- Country: Russia
- Region: Republic of Dagestan
- District: Akhvakhsky District
- Time zone: UTC+3:00

Ingerdakh (Russian: Ингердах; Avar: Ингердахъ) is a rural locality (a selo) and the administrative centre of Ingerdakhsky Selsoviet, Akhvakhsky District, Republic of Dagestan, Russia. The population was 1,063 as of 2010.

== Geography ==
Ingerdakh is located on the Karak River, 12 km east of Karata (the district's administrative centre) by road. Mesterukh is the nearest rural locality.
