= Andic =

Andic is a surname. Notable people with the surname include:

- Furkan Andıç (born 1990), Turkish actor and model
- Isak Andic (1953–2024), Spanish businessman
- Jonathan Andic, Spanish businessman, son of Isak
- Marko Anđić (born 1983), Serbian football player

== See also ==
- Proto-Avar-Andic, the unattested, reconstructed proto-language of the Avar–Andic languages, part of the Northeast Caucasian languages
  - Avar–Andic languages, one of the seven main branches of Northeast Caucasian language family
    - Andic languages, a branch of the Northeast Caucasian language family
- Andic soil or Andosol, soils found in volcanic areas formed in volcanic tephra
