= Mesterukh =

Mesterukh Местерух Местӏерухъ
- Selo
- Location within Republic of Dagestan Location within Russia
- Coordinates: 42°34′N 46°23′E
- Country: Russia
- Region: Republic of Dagestan
- District: Akhvakhsky District
- Time zone: UTC+3:00

Mesterukh (Russian: Местерух; Avar: Местӏерухъ) is a rural locality (a selo) in Akhvakhsky District, Republic of Dagestan, Russia. The population was 1,012 as of 2010.

== Geography ==
Mesterukh is located on the Mesterukhtlar River, 9 km southeast of Karata (the district's administrative centre) by road. Tukita is the nearest rural locality.
