= Godoberi people =

Andic ethnic group of Dagestan, Russia

Godoberi
гъибдилъи (Ghibdilhi)
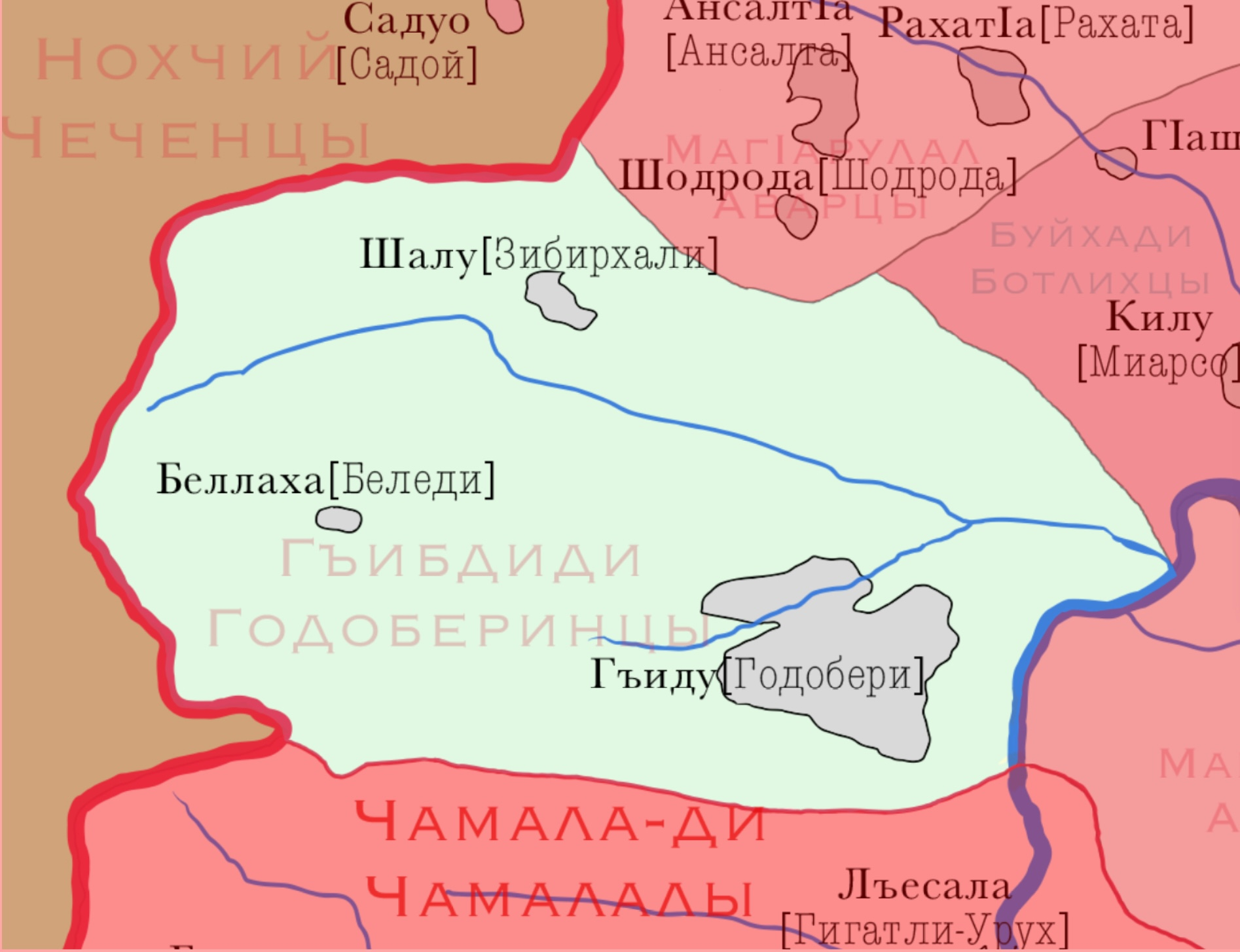

Total population
- c. 4,000 (2002 estimate)

Regions with significant populations
- Russia: Dagestan: 2,172 (2021)

Languages
- Godoberi, Avar, Russian

Religion
- Sunni Islam

Related ethnic groups
- Andic peoples, Avars, other Northeast Caucasian peoples

The Godoberi (Godoberi: гъибдилъи, Ghibdilhi; Russian: годоберинцы) are an Andic ethnic group indigenous to the mountainous region of southwestern Dagestan, Russia. They are one of the smallest indigenous peoples of the Northeast Caucasus and traditionally inhabit settlements in the upper Andi Koisu river basin. The Godoberi language belongs to the Andic branch of the Northeast Caucasian language family.

The traditional homeland of the Godoberi consists mainly of the villages of Godoberi and Zibirkhali in the modern Botlikhsky District of Dagestan. Although historically connected with the larger Avar cultural sphere, the Godoberi maintain a separate ethnic identity based on their language, historical settlement pattern, and local traditions.

Most Godoberi are Sunni Muslims. Their religious history developed within the broader Islamic tradition of Dagestan and was influenced by the political and religious movements of the region, including the Caucasian Imamate of Imam Shamil during the 19th century.

== Ethnonym ==
The Godoberi self-designation is Ghibdilhi (гъибдилъи). The name "Godoberi" derives from the Avar ethnonym Гъодоберисел, which was later adopted into Russian and European ethnographic literature.

As with many small ethnic groups of Dagestan, the Godoberi have historically been classified under broader categories in administrative documents. During the Russian imperial and Soviet periods, they were often recorded together with the Avars because of geographic proximity, political history, and the widespread use of Avar as a regional language.

Modern linguistic and ethnographic studies classify the Godoberi as a separate Andic people rather than as an Avar subgroup.

== Geography and settlements ==
The historical territory of the Godoberi lies in the western mountainous part of Dagestan, within the cultural region historically associated with Avaria. The area consists of steep mountain valleys and isolated settlements connected by traditional mountain routes.

The principal Godoberi settlements are:

- Godoberi
- Zibirkhali

The village of Godoberi became the source of the ethnonym used in Russian and international ethnographic literature. Traditional livelihoods were based on mountain agriculture, livestock breeding, and regional exchange with neighboring communities.

During the 20th century, migration from mountain settlements to lowland Dagestan increased. Today, many Godoberi live outside their traditional villages while maintaining connections with their ancestral homeland.

== Early history ==
The early history of the Godoberi is poorly documented because small mountain communities of western Dagestan traditionally preserved historical knowledge through oral traditions rather than written chronicles.

The ancestors of the Godoberi formed part of the ancient population of the eastern Caucasus from which the modern Andic-speaking peoples developed. Over centuries, these communities developed separate village identities while maintaining linguistic and cultural connections with neighboring peoples.

Traditional Godoberi society was organized around village communities governed by customary institutions known as adat. Local elders, clan groups, and village assemblies played important roles in maintaining social order.

== Godoberi and the Avar political sphere ==
Before Russian expansion into the Caucasus, the Godoberi region existed within the wider political and cultural influence of the Avar Khanate. The Avar Khanate was one of the most influential political formations in western Dagestan and maintained authority over many neighboring mountain communities.

Although politically connected to the Avar world, the Godoberi retained their own village institutions and language. Avar nevertheless became an important language of communication, religion, and administration among many Andic peoples.

== Godoberi and the Imamate of Shamil ==
During the Caucasian War (1817–1864), the Godoberi homeland became involved in the political and military struggles between the Russian Empire and the mountain peoples of Dagestan and Chechnya.

In the 1830s and 1840s, the Godoberi region came under the influence of the Caucasian Imamate, the Islamic state established by Imam Shamil. Shamil sought to unite the Muslim communities of Dagestan and Chechnya under a centralized administration based on Sharia law and military organization.

The location of the Godoberi villages in the upper Andi Koisu valley gave the area strategic importance. The valleys of western Dagestan served as communication routes between different communities participating in resistance against Russian expansion.

Under Shamil's rule, Islamic institutions expanded, although local village traditions and customary law continued to influence everyday social life. The degree of direct control exercised by the Imamate varied between different communities.

Following Imam Shamil's defeat and capture at Gunib in 1859, the Godoberi territory was incorporated into the Russian Empire, ending the political independence associated with the Imamate.

== Russian Empire period ==
Following the defeat of Imam Shamil at Gunib in 1859, the Godoberi territories were incorporated into the administrative system of the Russian Empire. The incorporation of Dagestan into the empire brought changes in administration, taxation, military recruitment, and legal institutions.

Despite imperial reforms, local village structures remained important. Community elders, customary law (adat), and Islamic institutions continued to regulate many aspects of social life, especially in remote mountain areas.

During the late 19th and early 20th centuries, the Godoberi experienced increasing interaction with Russian administrative and educational institutions. Russian gradually became important in official communication, while Avar remained a major regional language among neighboring Dagestani communities.

Islam remained central to Godoberi society during the imperial period. Mosques, Islamic scholars, and religious education continued to influence community life, although Russian authorities attempted at different times to regulate religious institutions in the Caucasus.

== Soviet period ==
After the Russian Revolution and the establishment of Soviet authority in Dagestan, the Godoberi became part of the Dagestan Autonomous Soviet Socialist Republic within the Russian Soviet Federative Socialist Republic.

Soviet nationality policy produced significant changes in the classification and administration of small ethnic groups. While Soviet authorities initially promoted local languages and cultures, administrative practices often favored larger recognized national groups.

Like several other small Andic-speaking communities, the Godoberi were frequently recorded together with the Avars in official statistics. This reflected both their close historical relationship with Avar society and the practical use of Avar as a regional language.

The Soviet period brought major social changes:

- collectivization transformed traditional agricultural practices;
- migration from mountain villages increased;
- Russian became dominant in education and administration;
- religious institutions were restricted during Soviet anti-religious campaigns.

Despite these transformations, the Godoberi language and ethnic identity continued to survive within families and local communities.

== Language ==
The Godoberi language belongs to the Northeast Caucasian language family and is classified within the Andic branch. It is closely related to Botlikh, Chamalal, Tindi, and other Andic languages of western Dagestan.

Godoberi is considered one of the smaller languages of Dagestan and has traditionally existed primarily as an oral language. Unlike larger Dagestani languages such as Avar, it did not develop an extensive literary tradition.

The language has two main varieties:

- the Godoberi village dialect;
- the Zibirkhali dialect.

The differences between these varieties are mainly phonetic and lexical, while the overall grammatical structure remains mutually understandable among speakers.

Godoberi vocabulary contains influences from neighboring languages, particularly Avar, Arabic, Turkish, and Russian. Borrowings reflect centuries of religious, political, and economic interaction with surrounding societies.

Today, most Godoberi speakers are multilingual. Avar remains important as a regional language of communication, while Russian dominates education, administration, and wider public life.

== Writing system and documentation ==
Historically, the Godoberi language did not possess a standardized writing system. Religious and scholarly texts among Dagestani Muslims were traditionally written in Arabic script, while Avar served as an important literary language for many neighboring Andic communities.

During the Soviet period, Russian became the dominant written language in education and administration. Although Soviet linguists documented many small Caucasian languages, Godoberi did not develop a large-scale literary tradition.

Modern linguistic research has produced grammatical descriptions, dictionaries, and recordings of Godoberi. These materials contribute to the preservation and study of the language.

== Religion ==
The Godoberi are traditionally Sunni Muslims. Islam became established in their region through the wider Islamic networks of Dagestan before the modern period.

Religious life historically combined Islamic practices with local customs and social institutions. As in other Dagestani mountain communities, Islamic law (Sharia) existed alongside customary law (adat).

During the period of the Caucasian Imamate, Islamic institutions gained increased political importance under Imam Shamil. However, local village structures remained influential in everyday social organization.

Under Soviet rule, religious activity was restricted, many mosques were closed, and religious education was suppressed. After the collapse of the Soviet Union, Islamic practice experienced a revival throughout Dagestan, including among the Godoberi.

== Traditional economy and society ==
Traditional Godoberi society developed within the mountainous environment of western Dagestan. Limited agricultural land and difficult terrain encouraged a mixed economy based on farming, livestock breeding, and local exchange networks.

The main traditional economic activities included:

- cultivation of grain crops and vegetables;
- sheep and cattle breeding;
- horticulture;
- handicrafts;
- trade with neighboring mountain communities.

Terraced agriculture and careful management of land resources were important adaptations to the mountainous landscape. Livestock also played an important economic and social role, providing food, materials, and a form of household wealth.

Social organization was traditionally based on extended families, kinship networks, and village communities. Local elders played an important role in resolving disputes, maintaining customary practices, and representing communities in relations with neighboring groups.

Like other peoples of Dagestan, the Godoberi historically maintained a balance between Islamic institutions and customary law (adat). Community decisions were shaped by both religious authorities and traditional village structures.

== Folklore and cultural heritage ==
Godoberi cultural traditions include oral literature, historical narratives, songs, proverbs, and traditional forms of storytelling. Because the language historically lacked a standardized written form, oral transmission played an especially important role in preserving cultural memory.

Traditional folklore reflects themes common among the peoples of Dagestan, including:

- heroic legends;
- village history;
- family traditions;
- moral teachings;
- relations between neighboring communities.

Music and oral poetry formed important elements of traditional cultural expression. Many elements of Godoberi culture are shared with other Andic and Avar-speaking peoples because of centuries of regional interaction.

== Population and demographics ==
The exact population of the Godoberi is difficult to determine because historical censuses did not always record them as a separate ethnic category. During the Russian imperial and Soviet periods, many Godoberi were classified together with the Avars.

Early Soviet population records listed the Godoberi as a small ethnic group numbering only a few thousand people. Modern ethnographic estimates generally place the number of ethnic Godoberi at approximately 3,000–4,000 people.

The majority of Godoberi live in the Republic of Dagestan, especially in and around their historical settlements of Godoberi and Zibirkhali. Migration has also created Godoberi communities in lowland Dagestan and urban areas.

== Modern identity and language preservation ==
In contemporary Dagestan, the Godoberi maintain a distinct ethnic identity despite strong influence from larger regional languages and cultures.

The main elements of modern Godoberi identity include:

- knowledge of the Godoberi language;
- connection to ancestral villages;
- shared historical memory;
- Islamic traditions;
- family and community networks.

The survival of the Godoberi language has become a major concern among linguists because of pressure from Russian and Avar. Younger generations often use Russian as their primary language of education and public communication, although Godoberi continues to be spoken within many families.

Academic documentation projects have focused on recording the language, preparing grammatical descriptions, and preserving oral traditions. These efforts contribute to the broader study and preservation of the smaller languages of the Caucasus.

== See also ==
- Godoberi language
- Andic peoples
- Andic languages
- Northeast Caucasian languages
- Avars (Caucasus)
- Avar Khanate
- Dagestan
- Islam in Dagestan
- Caucasian War
- Caucasian Imamate
- Imam Shamil
- Russian conquest of the Caucasus

== Bibliography ==
- Baddeley, John F. The Russian Conquest of the Caucasus. London: Longmans, Green and Co., 1908.
- Bobrovnikov, Vladimir. Islam in the Russian North Caucasus. London: Routledge, 2000.
- Comrie, Bernard. The Languages of the Soviet Union. Cambridge: Cambridge University Press, 1981.
- Gammer, Moshe. Muslim Resistance to the Tsar: Shamil and the Conquest of Chechnia and Daghestan. London: Frank Cass, 1994.
- Gammer, Moshe. The Lone Wolf and the Bear: Three Centuries of Chechen Defiance of Russian Rule. Pittsburgh: University of Pittsburgh Press, 2006.
- Hewitt, George. The Indigenous Languages of the Caucasus. Delmar, New York: Caravan Books, 1989.
- Hirsch, Francine. Empire of Nations: Ethnographic Knowledge and the Making of the Soviet Union. Ithaca: Cornell University Press, 2005.
- Kolga, Margus et al. The Red Book of the Peoples of the Russian Empire. Tallinn: Institute of Ethnology, Estonian Academy of Sciences, 1993.
- Koryakov, Yuri. Atlas of Caucasian Languages. Moscow: Institute of Linguistics, Russian Academy of Sciences, 2006.
