= Tsoloda =

Tsoloda Цолода Цӏолода
- Selo
- Location within Republic of Dagestan Location within Russia
- Coordinates: 42°38′N 46°21′E
- Country: Russia
- Region: Republic of Dagestan
- District: Akhvakhsky District
- Time zone: UTC+3:00

Tsoloda (Russian: Цолода; Avar: Цӏолода) is a rural locality (a selo) and the administrative centre of Tsolodinsky Selsoviet, Akhvakhsky District, Republic of Dagestan, Russia. The population was 534 as of 2010.

== Geography ==
Tsoloda is located 19 km northeast of Karata (the district's administrative centre) by road. Archo is the nearest rural locality.
