= Lologonitel =

Lologonitel Лологонитль Лологъонилъ
- Selo
- Location within Republic of Dagestan Location within Russia
- Coordinates: 42°30′N 46°19′E
- Country: Russia
- Region: Republic of Dagestan
- District: Akhvakhsky District
- Time zone: UTC+3:00

Lologonitel (Russian: Лологонитль; Avar: Лологъонилъ) is a rural locality (a selo) in Akhvakhsky District, Republic of Dagestan, Russia. The population was 1,457 as of 2010.

== Geography ==
Lologonitel is located on the Izanitlar River, 14 km south of Karata (the district's administrative centre) by road. Tad-Magitl is the nearest rural locality.
