= Verkhneye Inkhelo =

Verkhneye Inkhelo Верхнее Инхело Тӏад Инхело
- Selo
- Location within Republic of Dagestan Location within Russia
- Coordinates: 42°37′N 46°19′E
- Country: Russia
- Region: Republic of Dagestan
- District: Akhvakhsky District
- Time zone: UTC+3:00

Verkhneye Inkhelo (Russian: Верхнее Инхело; Avar: Тӏад Инхело) is a rural locality (a selo) and the administrative centre of Verkhneinkhelinsky Selsoviet, Akhvakhsky District, Republic of Dagestan, Russia. The population was 397 as of 2010.

== Geography ==
Verkhneye Inkhelo is located 10 km north of Karata (the district's administrative centre) by road, on the Akhvakh River. Mashtada is the nearest rural locality.
