= Karata people =

Ethnic group of Dagestan, North Caucasia

Karata
Khkhiridi
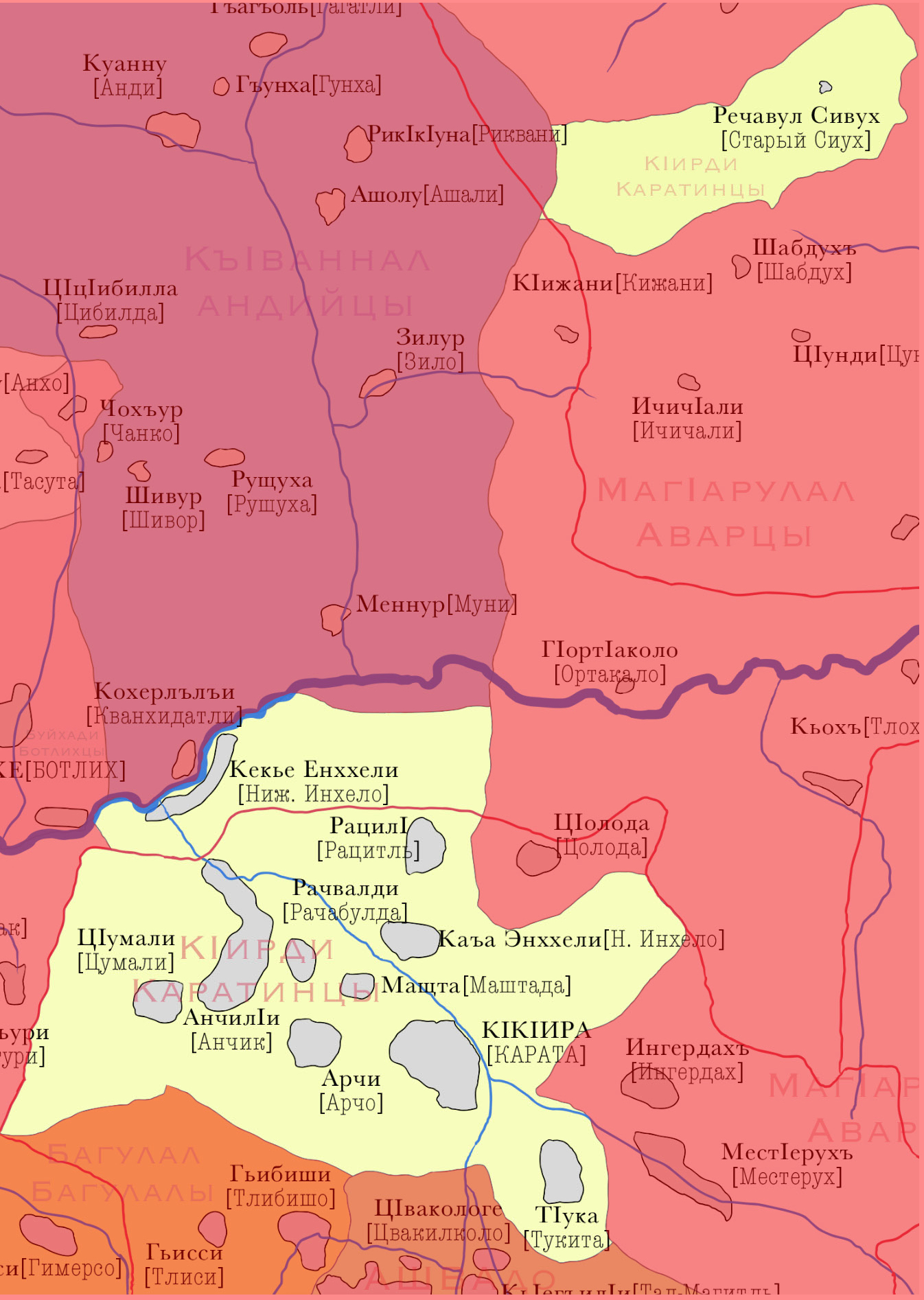

Total population
- c. 7,500

Regions with significant populations
- Russia: Dagestan: 7,343 (2021)

Languages
- Karata, Avar (literary)

Religion
- Sunni Islam

Related ethnic groups
- Tindi people and other Northeast Caucasian peoples

The Karata or Khkhiridi people are a small ethnic group from Dagestan, North Caucasus. The Karata mainly reside in the Akhvakh and Khasavyurt district. They primarily speak the Karata language.

== History ==
The Karatas and Avars share a close history. By the 18th century, the Karatas formed an autonomous "free community". There was frequent conflicts between the Karata and neighbouring peoples over control of grazing lands and pastures. In the early 19th century, the region was conquered by the Russians although an administrative structure did not emerge until the 1870s.

== Culture ==
The Karatas have historically engaged in raising livestock, farming, and bartering. Common animals raised include sheep, horses and cattle. Terraced farming was done due to adverse natural conditions and lack of cultivable land. Rye, flax, wheat, potatoes, and vegetables are staple crops grown.

The Karatas are Sunni Muslims. Islam first arrived in the region as early as the 8th century but the locals only adopted the religion around the 16th century due to the influence of Sufi missionaries.
