= Izano, Republic of Dagestan =

Izano Изано
- Selo
- Location within Republic of Dagestan Location within Russia
- Coordinates: 42°31′N 46°24′E
- Country: Russia
- Region: Republic of Dagestan
- District: Akhvakhsky District
- Time zone: UTC+3:00

Izano (Russian: Изано) is a rural locality (a selo) in Akhvakhsky District, Republic of Dagestan, Russia. The population was 1,212 as of 2010.

== Geography ==
Izano is located on the Izanitlar River, 15 km southeast of Karata (the district's administrative centre) by road. Kudiyabroso is the nearest rural locality.
