= Archo, Republic of Dagestan =

Archo Арчо Гӏарчо
- Selo
- Location within Republic of Dagestan Location within Russia
- Coordinates: 42°35′N 46°18′E
- Country: Russia
- Region: Republic of Dagestan
- District: Akhvakhsky District
- Time zone: UTC+3:00

Archo (Russian: Арчо; Avar: Гӏарчо) is a rural locality (a selo) in Akhvakhsky District, Republic of Dagestan, Russia. The population was 347 as of 2010.

== Geography ==
Archo is located 3 km west of Karata (the district's administrative centre) by road. Mashtada is the nearest rural locality.
