= Godoberi language =

Northeast Caucasian language

Godoberi
- ГъибдилIи мицци Ɣibdiƛi micci
- Pronunciation: [ʁibdit͡ɬi mitsːi]
- Native to: North Caucasus
- Region: Southwestern Dagestan
- Ethnicity: 3,000 Godoberi (2014)
- Native speakers: 3,000 (2020 census)
- Language family: Northeast Caucasian: Avar–Andic; Andic; Akhvakh–Tindi; Karata–Tindi; Botlikh–Tindi; Godoberi

Language codes
- ISO 639-3: gdo
- Glottolog: ghod1238
- ELP: Ghodoberi
- Godoberi

- Godoberi is classified as Definitely Endangered by the UNESCO Atlas of the World's Languages in Danger (2010)

Godoberi (also rendered Ghodoberi; self-designation Ghibdilhi mittsi) is an Andic language of the Northeast Caucasian language family spoken by the Godoberi in southwestern Dagestan, Russia. It is spoken by approximately 3000 people out of an ethnic population of 3,000. There are two dialects - Godoberi and Zibirhali, which differ mainly in pronunciation.

== History ==
The history of the Godoberis is unknown. The Godoberi language is the main thing distinguishes the cultural group from other groups in the area. When compared to other Andic languages, Godoberi is most similar to Chamalal and Botlikh. Some words are borrowed from Avar, Turkish, and Arabic. After being incorporated into the Russian Empire in the 19th century and then ruled by the Soviet Union in the 20th century, there is a strong Russian influence in the Godoberi language.

== Geographic distribution ==
Native speakers of Godoberi live in two villages: Godoberi (Ghidu in Godoberi) and Zibirkhali (Shalu in Godoberi). These villages are located in the mountains on the left bank of the Andi-Koisu River in southwest Dagestan, a republic of Russia.

== Phonology ==
Diphthongs are found only in Godoberi and in no other Daghestanian languages (example: cʼai 'fire'). There are 13 phonemic vowels: /i/, /e/, /a/, /o/, /u/, /iː/, /eː/, /aː/, /oː/, /uː/, /ĩ/, /ã/, /ũ/.

The consonant system is as follows:

Consonant phonemes
		Labial	Dental		Alveolar				Palatal		Velar		Uvular		Pharyngeal	Glottal
		Labial	Dental		central		lateral		Palatal		Velar		Uvular		Pharyngeal	Glottal
		Labial	lenis	fortis	lenis	fortis	lenis	fortis	lenis	fortis	lenis	fortis	lenis	fortis	Pharyngeal	Glottal
Nasal		m ⟨м⟩	n ⟨н⟩													
Plosive	voiced	b ⟨б⟩	d ⟨д⟩						(ɟ ⟨гʹ⟩)		ɡ ⟨г⟩					
Plosive	voiceless	p ⟨п⟩	t ⟨т⟩	(tː ⟨тт⟩)					(c ⟨кʹ⟩)	(cː ⟨ккʹ⟩)	k ⟨к⟩	(kː ⟨кк⟩)				ʔ ⟨ʼ⟩
Plosive	ejective		tʼ ⟨тӀ⟩						(cʼ ⟨кӀʹ⟩)		kʼ ⟨кӀ⟩		qʼ ⟨къ⟩			
Affricate	voiceless		t͡s ⟨ц⟩	t͡sː ⟨цц⟩	t͡ʃ ⟨ч⟩	t͡ʃː ⟨чч⟩		t͡ɬː ⟨лӀ⟩					q͡χ ⟨хъ⟩			
Affricate	ejective		t͡sʼ ⟨цӀ⟩		t͡ʃʼ ⟨чӀ⟩		t͡ɬʼ ⟨кь⟩									
Affricate	voiced				d͜ʒ ⟨дж⟩											
Fricative	voiceless		s ⟨с⟩	sː ⟨сс⟩	ʃ ⟨ш⟩	ʃː ⟨щ⟩	ɬ ⟨лъ⟩	ɬː ⟨лълъ⟩		(çː ⟨хьʹ⟩)		xː ⟨хь⟩	χ ⟨х⟩	χː ⟨хх⟩	ʜː ⟨хӀ⟩	h ⟨гь⟩
Fricative	voiced		z ⟨з⟩		ʒ ⟨ж⟩								ʁ ⟨гъ⟩		ʕ ⟨ъ⟩	
Trill					r ⟨р⟩											
Approximant		w ⟨в⟩					l ⟨л⟩	(lː ⟨лл⟩)	j ⟨й⟩							

The accent system is extremely complex, especially for nouns.

prosodic patterns in Godoberi
	initial stress (H!H)	initial stress (HL)	initial/ prefinal/ final (HH)	final (HL-B)	final/ prefinal (HL!)	final/ prefinal (LL)	final/ initial (HH!)	final/ initial (LL-B)	final/ prefinal/ initial (HH-B)
Nominative	gédu 'cat'	íča 'mare'	íma 'father'	qučá 'sheepskin'	buRá 'bull'	haí 'eye'	łerú 'feather'	set'íl 'finger'	ziní 'cow'
Genitive	géduLi 'cat'	íčLi 'mare'	imúLi 'father'	qučiLí 'sheepskin'	buRáLi 'bull'	háiLi 'eye'	łéruLi 'feather'	sét'ilaLi 'finger'	zináLi 'cow
Dative	gédułi 'cat'	íčałi 'mare'	ímułi 'father'	qučiłí 'sheepskin'	buRałí 'bull'	haiłi 'eye'	łérułli 'feather'	sét'ilałi 'finger'	zínałi 'cow'
Ergative	gédudi 'cat'	íčadi 'mare'	imudí 'father	qučidí 'sheepskin'	buRadí 'bull'	haidí 'eye	łérudi 'feather'	sét'iladi 'finger	zinadí 'cow'

== Morphology ==
Singular words have three genders: masculine, feminine, and neuter. Plural words lack those three genders and instead have two noun classes: human or inanimate object. There are two types of adjectives: primary and participles. A majority of the primary adjectives do not have gender. The four types of participles are past, present, future, and non-future negative. The numerical system does not vary greatly from other languages. Verb morphology is also regular compared to other languages in the Andic language family.

== Orthography ==
Godoberi is not a written language, and it is used only in the home. Schools teach Avar and Russian. Native speakers of Godoberi use Avar or Russian as a written language. These two languages are also used when speaking to people from neighboring communities.

=== Provisional writing systems ===
The following transcription is used in a recent dictionary of the language.

Godoberi transcription
А а	А̄ а̄	Аᵸ аᵸ	Б б	В в	Г г	Гъ гъ	Гь гь	ГI гI	Д д	Е е	Е̄ е̄	Еᵸ еᵸ
Ж ж	Дж дж	З з	И и	Ӣ ӣ	Иᵸ иᵸ	Й й	К к	Къ къ	Кь кь	КI кI	Л л	Лъ лъ
ЛI лI	М м	Н н	О о	О̄ о̄	Оᵸ оᵸ	П п	Р р	С с	Т т	ТI тI	У у	Ӯ ӯ
Уᵸ уᵸ	Х х	Хъ хъ	Хь хь	ХI хI	Ц ц	ЦI цI	Ч ч	ЧI чI	Ш ш	Щ щ	Э э	Ъ ъ

⟨Э⟩ is used in initial position, ⟨е⟩ elsewhere. Acute accents are used for stress, but not treated as creating distinct letters.

The letters shown in the phonology section above were used in an older grammatical description.
