= Akhvakh =

Akhvakh (also rendered Ahwah) may refer to:

- The Akhvakh language
- The Akhvakh people
