= Tindi =

Tindi may refer to:

- Tindi people, an indigenous people of the Caucasus
- Tindi language, their language
- Tindi, Estonia, a village in Estonia
