= Chamalal =

Chamalal may refer to:

- The Chamalal people
- The Chamalal language
- Chaman Lal (novelist)
- Chaman Lal Chaman (London-based Punjabi poet)
- Chaman Lal Gupta (former minister of state in the Government of India)
- Chaman Lal Malhotra (former Indian cricketer)
