= Bagvalal =

Bagvalal may be,

- Bagvalal people
- Bagvalal language
