= Rachabulda =

Rachabulda Рачабулда
- Selo
- Location within Republic of Dagestan Location within Russia
- Coordinates: 42°37′N 46°18′E
- Country: Russia
- Region: Republic of Dagestan
- District: Akhvakhsky District
- Time zone: UTC+3:00

Rachabulda (Russian: Рачабулда) is a rural locality (a selo) in Karatinsky Selsoviet, Akhvakhsky District, Republic of Dagestan, Russia. The population was 167 as of 2010.

== Geography ==
Rachabulda is located 7 km northwest of Karata (the district's administrative centre) by road. Mashtada is the nearest rural locality.
