= Bagvalal people =

Ethnic group of Dagestan, Russia

Bagvalal
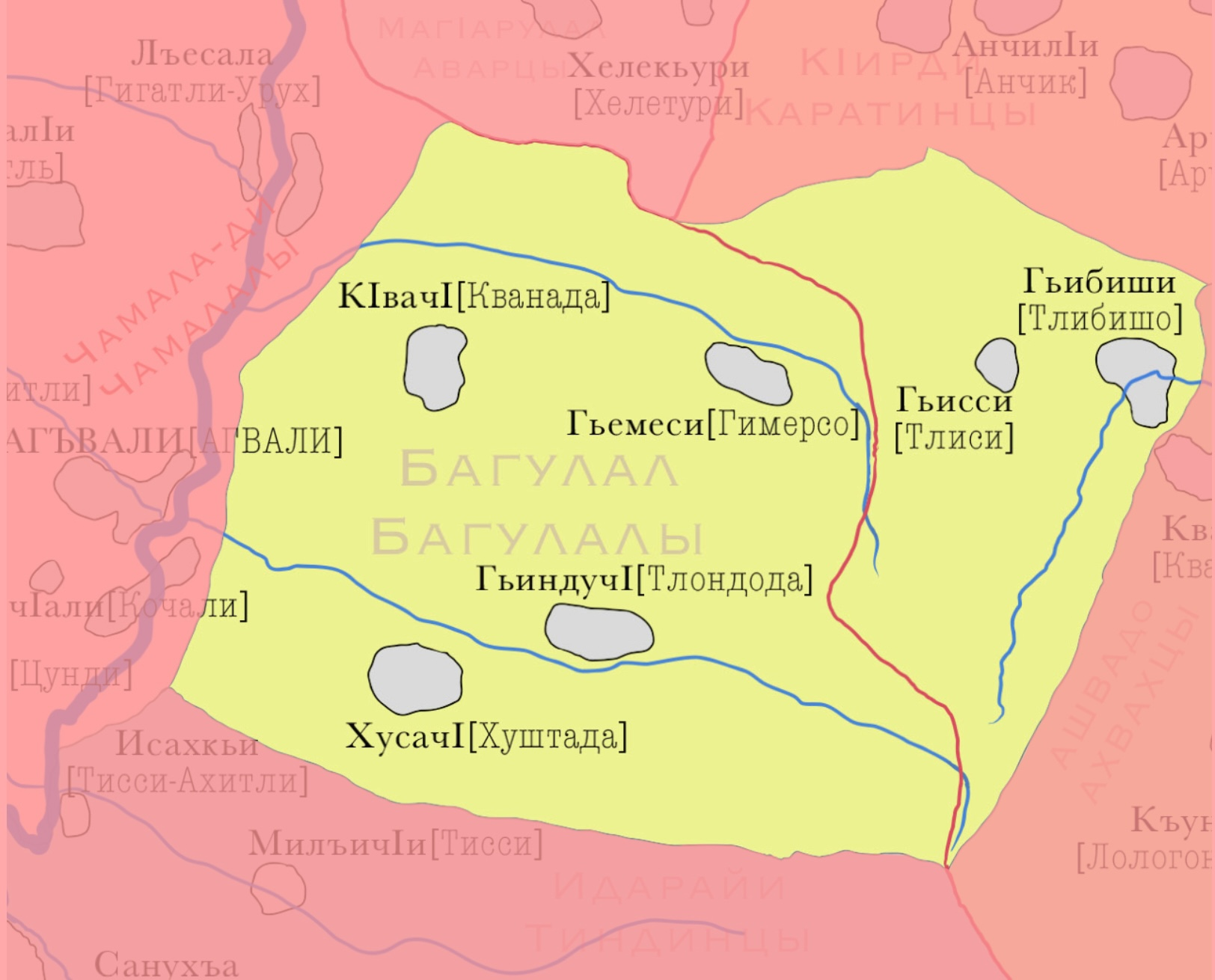

Total population
- c. 5,000

Regions with significant populations
- Russia: Dagestan: c. 5000 (2002 estimate)

Languages
- Bagvalal language

Religion
- Islam (Sunni Islam)

Related ethnic groups
- Northeast Caucasian peoples

The Bagvalal (also called Bagulal, Kwantl Hekwa, Bagolal, Kwanadi, Bagulaltsy, Kvanadin, and Kvanadintsy) are an Avar–Andi–Dido people of Dagestan, speaking the Bagvalal language. Since the 1930s they have been largely classed as and assimilated by the Avars. However there were still some people reported separately in the 2002 census. The tradition and culture of the Bagvalal people is very similar to that of the Avar people, due to their common history within the Avar Khanate.

== Geography ==
The Bagvalal live in mountain villages in the Tsumadinsky District of Dagestan. The names of the Bagvalal villages are: Kvanada, Gimerso, Tlisi, Tlibisho, Khushtada, and Tlondada.

== Demographics ==
In 1926 there were 3,054 Bagvalals.

== Religion ==
The Bagvalals are Sunni Muslims. They adopted the religion by the 16th century due to the influence of Sufi missionaries.

== Sources ==
- Wixman, Ronald. The Peoples of the USSR: An Ethnographic Handbook. (Armonk, New York: M. E. Sharpe, Inc., 1984) p. 19.
