= Ratsitl =

Ratsitl Рацитль
- Selo
- Location within Republic of Dagestan Location within Russia
- Coordinates: 42°38′N 46°19′E
- Country: Russia
- Region: Republic of Dagestan
- District: Akhvakhsky District
- Time zone: UTC+3:00

Ratsitl (Russian: Рацитль) is a rural locality (a selo) in Verkhneinkhelinsky Selsoviet, Akhvakhsky District, Republic of Dagestan, Russia. The population was 114 as of 2010.

== Geography ==
Ratsitl is located 23 km north of Karata (the district's administrative centre) by road. Tsoloda is the nearest rural locality.
