= Tlibisho =

Tlibisho Тлибишо
- Selo
- Location within Republic of Dagestan Location within Russia
- Coordinates: 42°33′N 46°18′E
- Country: Russia
- Region: Republic of Dagestan
- District: Akhvakhsky District
- Time zone: UTC+3:00

Tlibisho (Russian: Тлибишо) is a rural locality (a selo) and the administrative centre of Tlibishinsky Selsoviet, Akhvakhsky District, Republic of Dagestan, Russia. The population was 941 as of 2010.

== Geography ==
Tlibisho is located on the Akhvakh River, 12 km southwest of Karata (the district's administrative centre) by road. Tlisi is the nearest rural locality.
