= Tindi people =

Ethnic group of Dagestan, Russia

Tindi
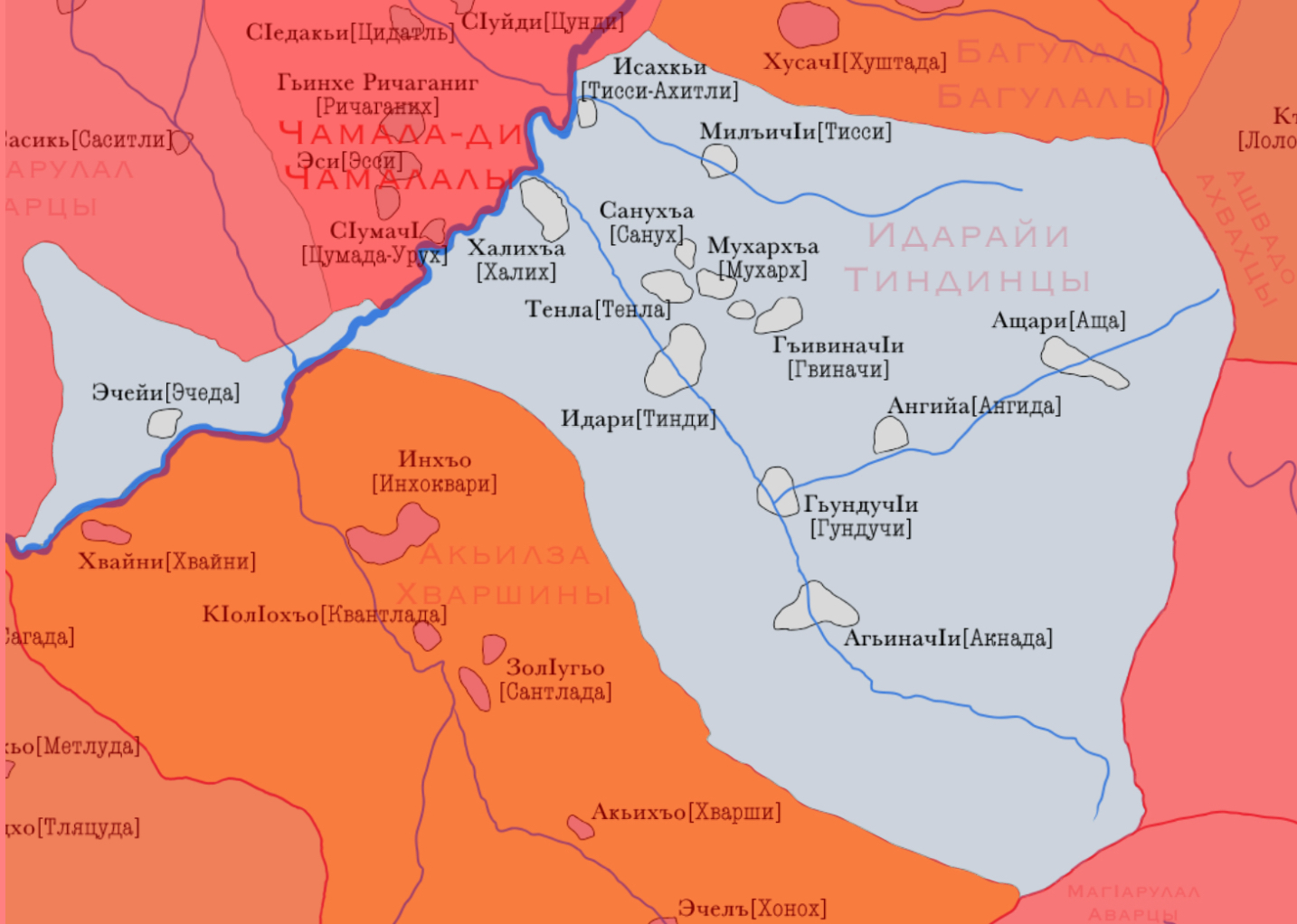

Total population
- c. 10,000 (high. est.)

Regions with significant populations
- Russia: Dagestan: 1,161 (2021)

Languages
- Tindi

Religion
- Sunni Islam

Related ethnic groups
- Northeast Caucasian peoples

The Tindi are an indigenous people of Dagestan, North Caucasus living in five villages in the central area around the Andi-Koysu river and the surrounding mountains in northwestern southern Dagestan. They have their own language, Tindi, and primarily follow Sunni Islam, which reached the Tindi people around the 8th or 9th century. The only time the Tindi were counted as a distinct ethnic group in the Russian Census was in 1926, when 3,812 reported being ethnic Tindis. In 1967, there were about 5,000 ethnic Tindi (T. Gudava). They are culturally similar to the Avars.

The basis of the Tindis' ethnic identity is their language, but its use is limited to domestic settings and is decreasing. Therefore, the Tindis are in danger of assimilation by the Avars, whose language is the dominant local one.

Neighboring peoples are the Chamalals, Avars, Bagvalals, Akhvakhs, and Khwarshis.
