= Bagvalal language =

Northeast Caucasian language

Bagvalal
- Bagualal, Bagwalal
- багвалал мисӀсӀ
- Pronunciation: [bagwalal mis’ː]
- Native to: North Caucasus
- Region: Southwestern Dagestan
- Ethnicity: Bagvalal people
- Native speakers: 2,300 (2020 census)
- Language family: Northeast Caucasian: Avar–Andic; Andic; Akhvakh–Tindi; Karata–Tindi; Botlikh–Tindi; Bagvalal–Tindi; Bagvalal

Language codes
- ISO 639-3: kva
- Glottolog: bagv1239
- ELP: Bagvalal
- Bagvalal

- Bagvalal is classified as Definitely Endangered by the UNESCO Atlas of the World's Languages in Danger (2010)

The Bagvalal language (Bagulal) is an Avar–Andic language spoken by the Bagvalals in southwestern Dagestan, Russia, along the right bank of the river Andi-Koisu and the surrounding hills, near the Georgian border. It is fairly similar to Tindi, its closest relative. The 2020 Russian census recorded 2,297 Bagvalal speakers.

== Dialects ==
Bagvalal has three dialects, named for the villages where they are spoken: Kwanada, Khushtada, and Tlisi. Only the Tlisi dialect has been significantly studied, because of its similarities to the Tindi language.

== Speakers ==
Bagvalal is in serious danger of extinction. The schooling and cultural revolution have contributed to its decline. Bagvalal pupils are taught in Avar in primary school, and in secondary school they are taught in Russian. Between 1950 and 1970, Bagvalals migrated to different districts in the Astrakhan province of Russia, and this also affected the Bagvalal language. Despite this, most of the Bagvalal are supportive of the language, and 30% to 50% of children are fluent in it. While it is still used for everyday communication, younger speakers do not speak it as well as older speakers.

== History ==
Bagvalal was first mentioned in the 19th century, but very few recordings of the language have been made. There has been very little linguistic research done on the language, with the exception of a 2001 book.

== Phonology ==
=== Consonants ===
			Labial	Dental		Lateral		Sibilant		Postalveolar		Palatal	Velar		Uvular		Pharyngeal	Laryngeal	
			Labial	plain	lab.	plain	lab.	plain	lab.	plain	lab.	Palatal	plain	lab.	plain	lab.	Pharyngeal	plain	lab.
Plosive & affricate	voiced		b	d	dʷ					d͡ʒ			g	gʷ					
Plosive & affricate	voiceless		p	t	tʷ			t͡s	t͡sʷ	t͡ʃ	t͡ʃʷ		k	kʷ	q	qʷ			
Plosive & affricate	ejective			tʼ	tʷʼ	tɬʼ	tɬʷʼ	t͡sʼ	t͡sʷʼ	t͡ʃʼ	t͡ʃʷʼ		kʼ	kʷʼ	qʼ	qʷʼ		ʔ	
Fricative	voiced							z	zʷ	ʒ	ʒʷ				ʁ	ʁʷ	ʕ		
Fricative	voiceless	lenis				ɬ		s	sʷ	ʃ	ʃʷ		x		χ	χʷ	ħ	h	hʷ
Fricative	voiceless	fortis				ɬ̄		s̄	s̄ʷ	ʃ̄					χ̄	χ̄ʷ			
Fricative	ejective							sʼ	sʷʼ	ʃʼ	ʃ̄ʷʼ								
Nasal			m	n															
Liquid				r	rʷ	l	lʷ												
Glide												j		w					

== Lexicon ==
Bagvalal has numerous loanwords from such languages as Arabic, Russian, Turkish, and Avar. It is only used as an oral language; Avar or Russian are used as written languages. Nowadays Bagvalal is only used in family settings, using Avar or Russian for every other area of communication.
