= Chamalal people =

Ethnic group of Dagestan, Russia

Chamalals
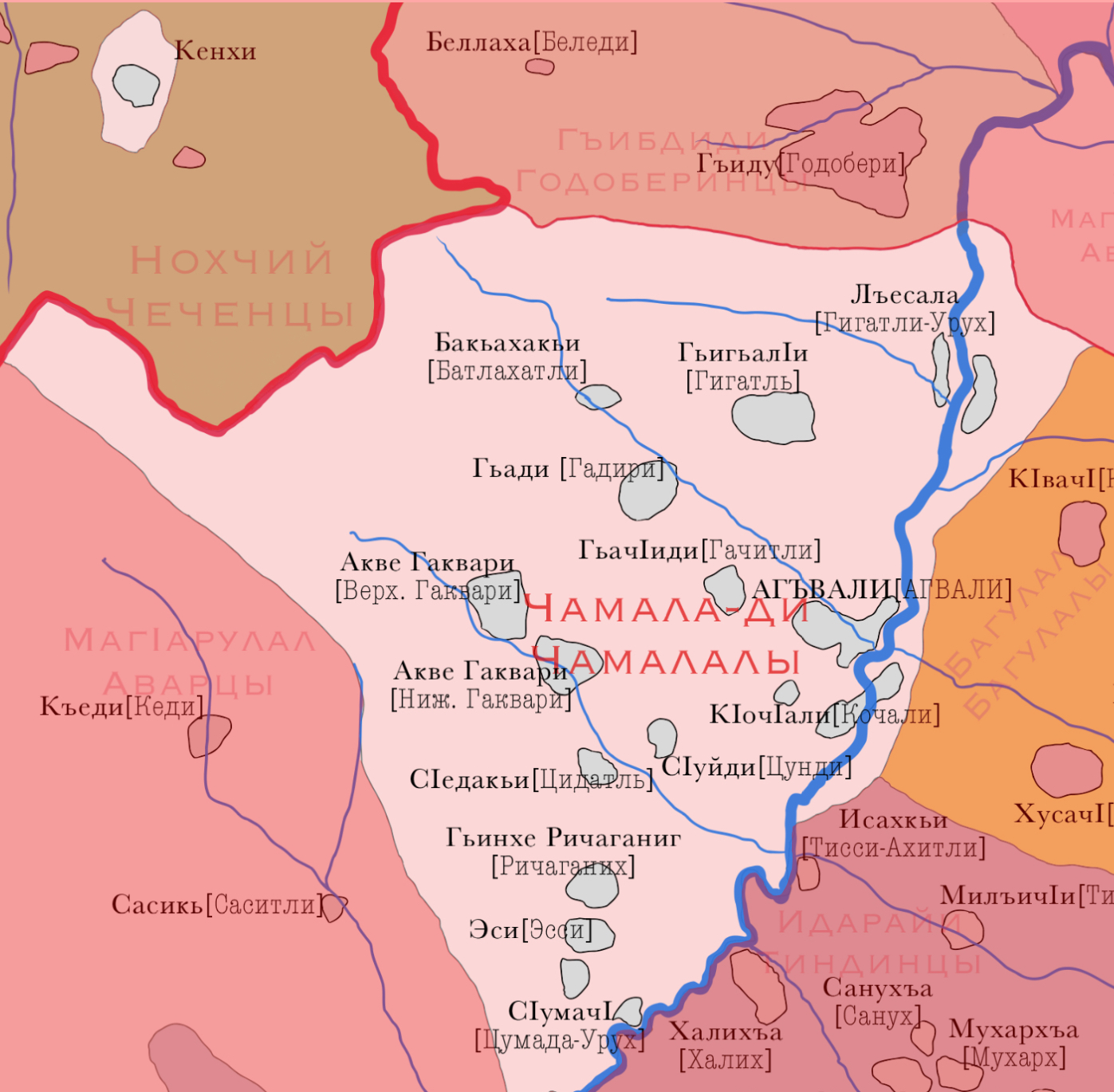

Total population
- c. 10,000 (2002 estimate)

Regions with significant populations
- Russia

Languages
- Chamalal

Religion
- Islam

Related ethnic groups
- Northeast Caucasian peoples

The Chamalals are an indigenous people of Dagestan, North Caucasia living in a few villages in the Tsumadinsky District on the left bank of the Andi-Koysu river. They have their own language, Chamalal, and primarily follow Sunni Islam, which reached the Chamalal people around the 8th or 9th century. There are about 5,000 ethnic Chamalals (1999, Kubrik). They are culturally similar to the Avars.

Neighboring peoples are the Godoberi, Avars, Bagvalals, and Tindis.
