= Anchik =

Anchik Анчик
- Selo
- Location within Republic of Dagestan Location within Russia
- Coordinates: 42°36′N 46°16′E
- Country: Russia
- Region: Republic of Dagestan
- District: Akhvakhsky District
- Time zone: UTC+3:00

Anchik (Russian: Анчик) is a rural locality (a selo) and the administrative centre of Anchiksky Selsoviet, Akhvakhsky District, Republic of Dagestan, Russia. The population was 819 as of 2010. There are 2 streets.

== Geography ==
Anchik is located 10 km northwest of Karata (the district's administrative centre) by road. Rachabulda is the nearest rural locality.
