= Antsukh =

Antsukh Анцух
- Selo
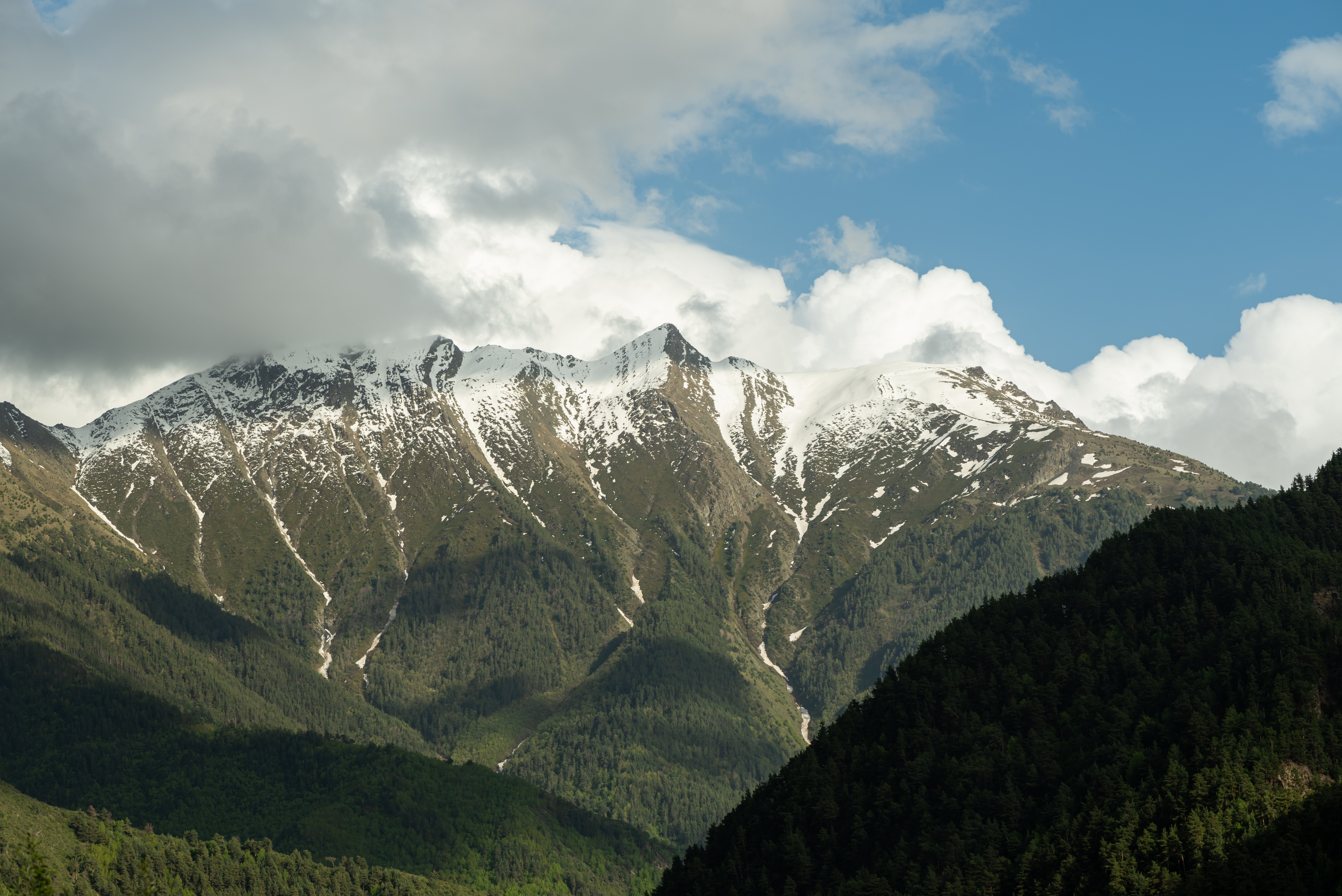
- Mountains near Antsukh

- Location within Republic of Dagestan Location within Russia
- Coordinates: 42°11′N 46°20′E
- Country: Russia
- Region: Republic of Dagestan
- District: Tlyaratinsky District
- Time zone: UTC+3:00

Antsukh (Russian: Анцух, Avar: Анцухъ) is a rural locality (a selo) in Chadakolobsky Selsoviet, Tlyaratinsky District, Republic of Dagestan, Russia. Population: 97 (2010 census); 173 (2002 census); 243 (1989 Soviet census).

== Geography ==
Antsukh is located 13 km north of Tlyarata (the district's administrative centre) by road. Gebguda and Katroso are the nearest rural localities.
