= Gimerso =

Gimerso Гимерсо
- Selo
- Location within Republic of Dagestan Location within Russia
- Coordinates: 42°33′N 46°13′E
- Country: Russia
- Region: Republic of Dagestan
- District: Tsumadinsky District
- Time zone: UTC+3:00

Gimerso (Russian: Гимерсо) is a rural locality (a selo) in Tsumadinsky District, Republic of Dagestan, Russia. Population: 298 (2021 census); 263 (2002 census); 229 (1989 Soviet census). There are 2 streets in this selo.

== Geography ==
Selo is located 9 km from Agvali (the district's administrative centre), 113 km from Makhachkala (capital of Dagestan) and 1,628 km from Moscow. Tlisi is the nearest rural locality.
