= Siukh =

Siukh Сиух Сивухъ
- Selo
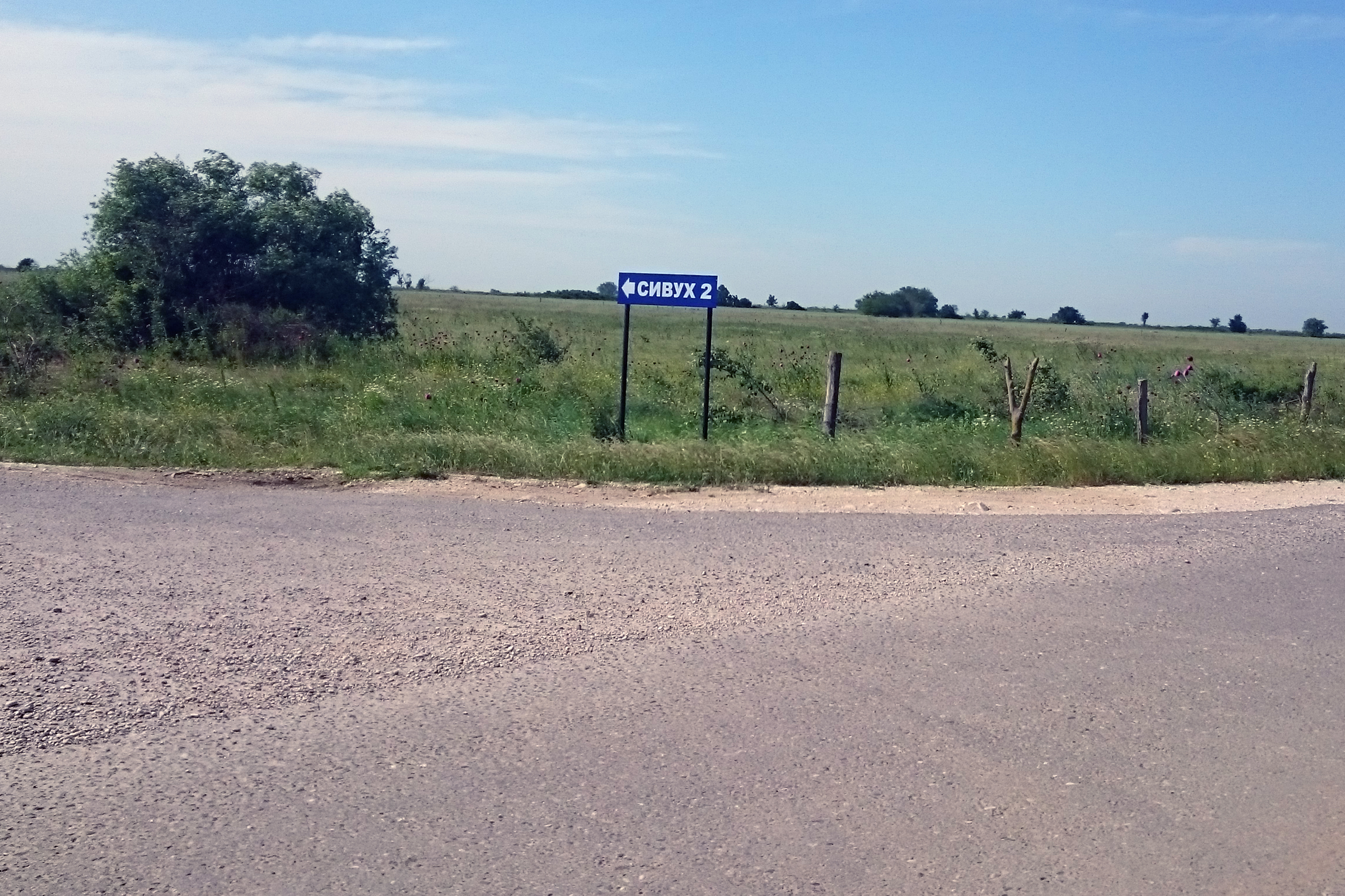

- Location within Republic of Dagestan Location within Russia
- Coordinates: 43°24′N 46°36′E
- Country: Russia
- Region: Republic of Dagestan
- District: Khasavyurtovsky District
- Time zone: UTC+3:00

Siukh (Russian: Сиух; Avar: Сивухъ) is a rural locality (a selo) in Khasavyurtovsky District, Republic of Dagestan, Russia. Population: 4,567 (2021 census); 3,199 (2002 census); 2,746 (1989 Soviet census). There are 27 streets.

== Geography ==
Siukh is located 23 km north of Khasavyurt (the district's administrative centre) by road. Tsiyab Ichichali is the nearest rural locality.
