= Tukita =

Tukita Тукита
- Selo
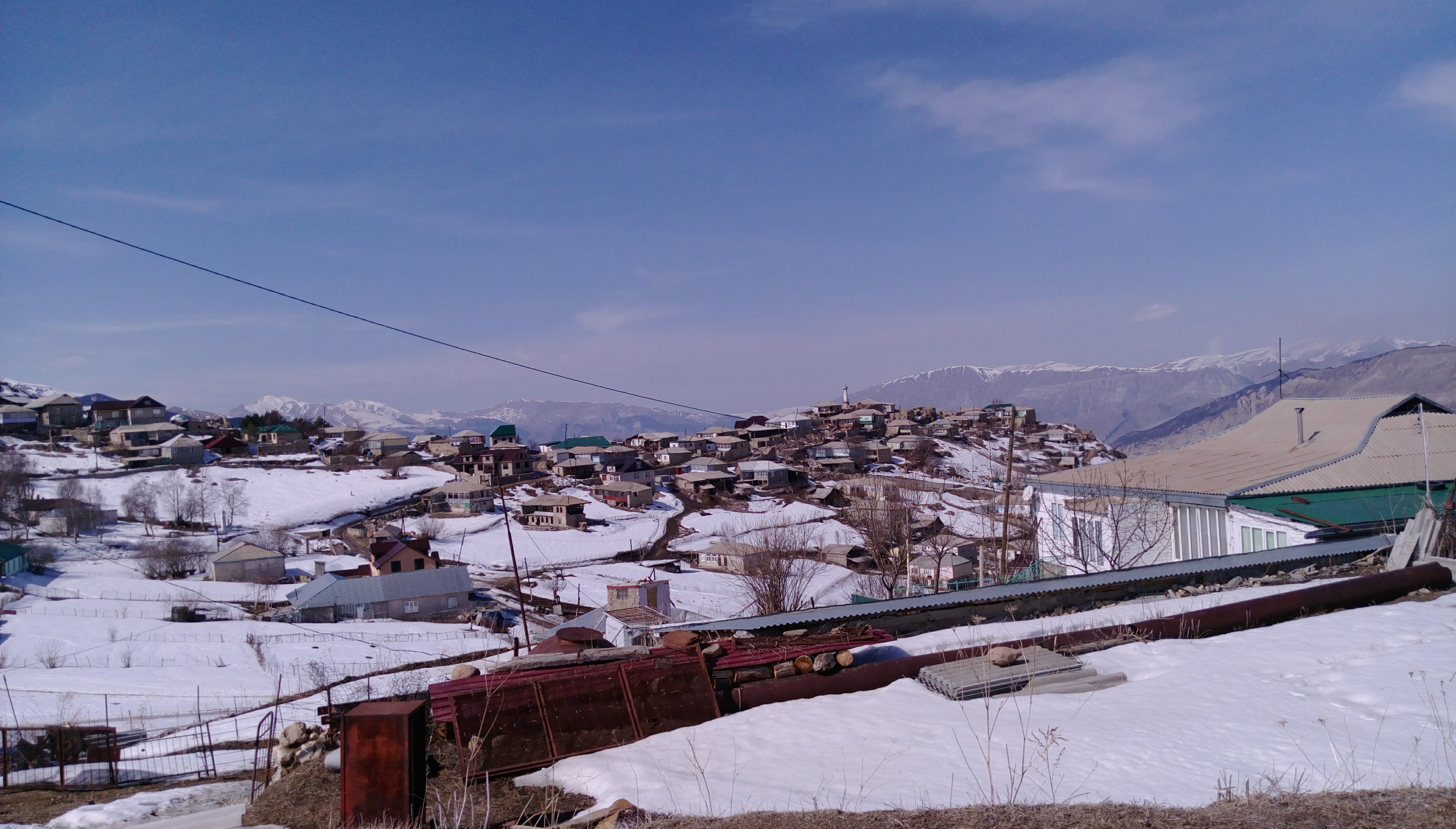
- Tukita in 2018

- Location within Republic of Dagestan Location within Russia
- Coordinates: 42°34′N 46°22′E
- Country: Russia
- Region: Republic of Dagestan
- District: Akhvakhsky District
- Time zone: UTC+3:00

Tukita (Russian: Тукита) is a rural locality (a selo) in Akhvakhsky District, Republic of Dagestan, Russia. The population was 763 as of 2010.

== Geography ==
Tukita is located 11 km southeast of Karata (the district's administrative centre) by road. Mesterukh is the nearest rural locality.
