= Akhvakh people =

Ethnic group of Dagestan, Russia

Akhvakhs
ашвадо
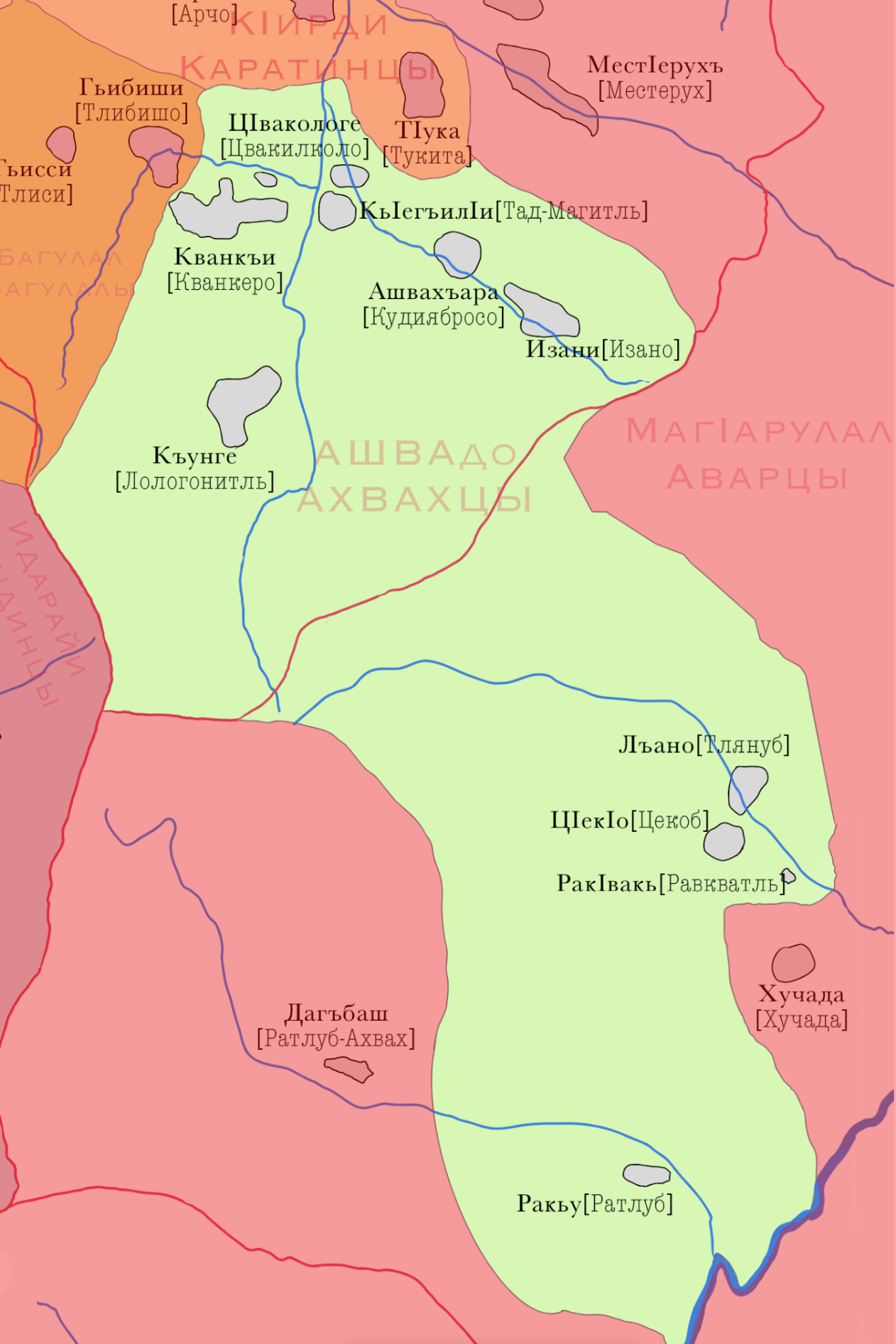

Total population
- c. 10,000

Regions with significant populations
- Russia: 5,282 (2021 census)
- Azerbaijan: 2,600 (estimate)

Languages
- Akhvakh language

Religion
- Sunni Islam

Related ethnic groups
- Northeast Caucasian peoples

The Akhvakhs (also known as Akhwakh, Akhvakhtsy or G'akhevalal; ГІахьвалал in Avar) are one of the Andi–Dido peoples of Dagestan and have their own language. They call themselves Atluatii or Ashvado. Prior to 1930 Soviet ethnologists considered them to be a distinct ethnic group. Since that time they have often been classified as Avars.

== Demographics ==
The Akvakh live in the Akhvakhsky District of Dagestan between the Avar and Andi Rivers. In 1926 they numbered 3,683. The Akhvakhs are mainly Sunni Muslims. They adopted the religion by the 16th century due to the influence of Sufi missionaries. They face continued assimilation by the Avars. By the early 1990s it was estimated that about 8,000 people were Akhvakh, although this number includes those who have been fully assimilated as Avars but still recognize that they have Akhvakh ancestry.

They also live in Zagatala, Azerbaijan, the north-western part of Azerbaijan which is bordered on Russia and Georgia. The Akhakhdere ("Axəxdərə" in Azeri language) village is the only village that Akhvakh people live. They are a distinct people from the Avar, though their ID cards contain information about their nationality being "Avar".

== Notable individuals ==
- Zabit Magomedsharipov - former MMA fighter
- Khasan Magomedsharipov - MMA fighter

== Sources ==
- Wixman, Ronald. The Peoples of the USSR: An Ethnographic Handbook. (Armonk, New York: M. E. Sharpe, Inc, 1984) pp. 7–8
- Olson, James S., An Ethnohistorical Dictionary of the Russian and Soviet Empires. (Westport: Greenwood Press, 1994) pp. 25–26
