= Shulani =

Shulani Шулани Щуланиб
- Selo
- Location within Republic of Dagestan Location within Russia
- Coordinates: 42°18′N 46°55′E
- Country: Russia
- Region: Republic of Dagestan
- District: Gunibsky District
- Time zone: UTC+3:00

Shulani (Russian: Шулани; Avar: Щуланиб) is a rural locality (a selo) and the administrative centre of Shulaninsky Selsoviet, Gunibsky District, Republic of Dagestan, Russia. The population was 745 as of 2010. There are 2 streets.

== Geography ==
Shulani is located 23 km south of Gunib (the district's administrative centre) by road. Unty and Batsada are the nearest rural localities.

== Nationalities ==
Avars live there.
