= Mashtada =

Mashtada Маштада
- Selo
- Location within Republic of Dagestan Location within Russia
- Coordinates: 42°36′N 46°18′E
- Country: Russia
- Region: Republic of Dagestan
- District: Akhvakhsky District
- Time zone: UTC+3:00

Mashtada (Russian: Маштада) is a rural locality (a selo) in Verkhneinkhelinsky Selsoviet, Akhvakhsky District, Republic of Dagestan, Russia. The population was 268 as of 2010.

== Geography ==
Mashtada is located on the left bank of the Akhvakh River, 4 km northwest of Karata (the district's administrative centre) by road. Rachabulda is the nearest rural locality.
