= Nizhneye Inkhelo =

Nizhneye Inkhelo Нижнее Инхело Гъоркьинхело
- Selo
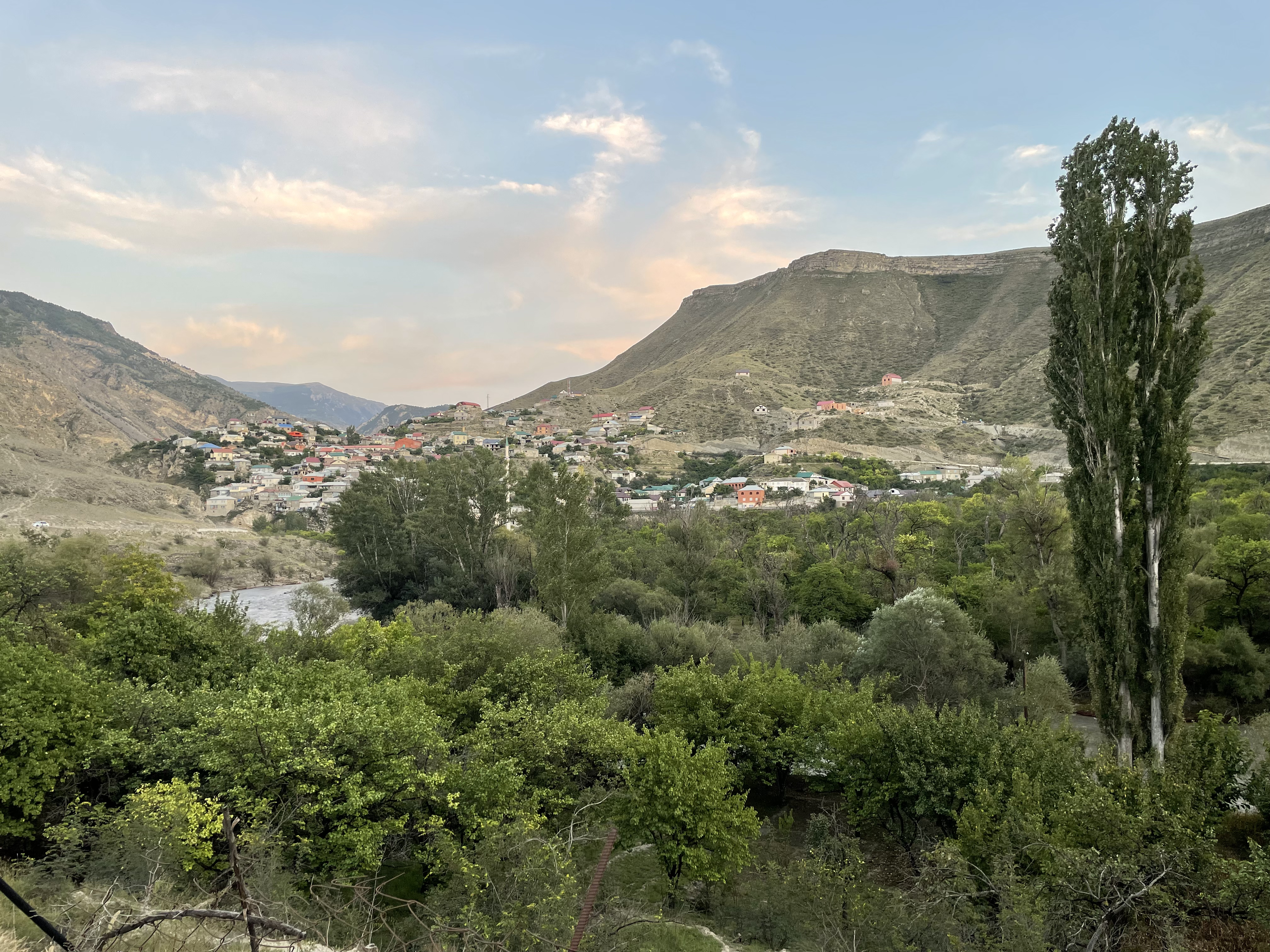

- Location within Republic of Dagestan Location within Russia
- Coordinates: 42°38′N 46°15′E
- Country: Russia
- Region: Republic of Dagestan
- District: Botlikhsky District
- Time zone: UTC+3:00

Nizhneye Inkhelo (Russian: Нижнее Инхело; Avar: Гъоркьинхело) is a rural locality (a selo) in Botlikhsky District, Republic of Dagestan, Russia. The population was 2,113 as of 2010. There are 17 streets.

== Geography ==
Nizhneye Inkhelo is located 3 km east of Botlikh (the district's administrative centre) by road, on the right bank of the Andiyskoye Koysu River. Botlikh is the nearest rural locality.
