= Tlisi =

Tlisi Тлиси
- Selo
- Location within Republic of Dagestan Location within Russia
- Coordinates: 42°33′N 46°16′E
- Country: Russia
- Region: Republic of Dagestan
- District: Akhvakhsky District
- Time zone: UTC+3:00

Tlisi (Russian: Тлиси) is a rural locality (a selo) in Tlibishinsky Selsoviet, Akhvakhsky District, Republic of Dagestan, Russia. The population was 211 as of 2010.

== Geography ==
Tlisi is located on the Chuandi River, 15 km southwest of Karata (the district's administrative centre) by road. Tlibisho is the nearest rural locality.
