= Tindi, Republic of Dagestan =

Tindi Тинди
- Selo
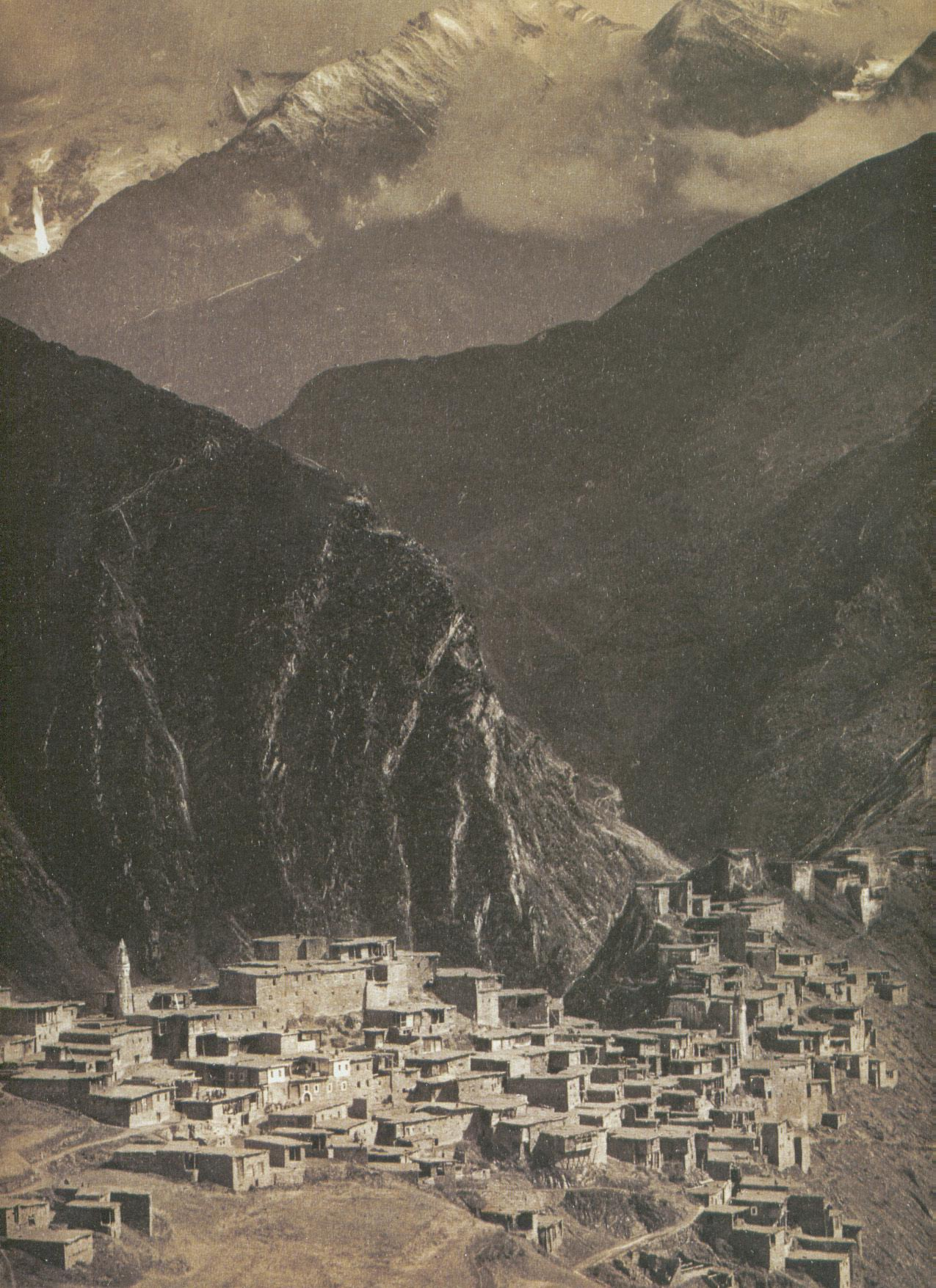

- Location within Republic of Dagestan Location within Russia
- Coordinates: 42°27′N 46°08′E
- Country: Russia
- Region: Republic of Dagestan
- District: Tsumadinsky District
- Time zone: UTC+3:00

Tindi (Russian: Тинди) is a rural locality (a selo) in Tsumadinsky District, Republic of Dagestan, Russia. Population: 2,711 (2021 census); 2,005 (2002 census); 1,298 (1989 Soviet census). There are 23 streets in this selo.

== Geography ==
Selo is located 10 km from Agvali (the district's administrative centre), 125 km from Makhachkala (capital of Dagestan) and 1,636 km from Moscow. Tenla is the nearest rural locality.
