= Tukita, Khasavyurtovsky District =

Tukita Тукита
- Selo
- Location within Republic of Dagestan Location within Russia
- Coordinates: 43°29′N 46°37′E
- Country: Russia
- Region: Republic of Dagestan
- District: Khasavyurtovsky District
- Time zone: UTC+3:00

Tukita (Russian: Тукита) is a rural locality (a selo) in Khasavyurtovsky District, Republic of Dagestan, Russia. Population: 1,320 (2021 census); 614 (2002 census); 524 (1989 Soviet census). There are 14 streets.

== Geography ==
Tukita is located 34 km north of Khasavyurt (the district's administrative centre) by road. Inkhelo is the nearest rural locality.
