= Akhvakh language =

Northeast Caucasian language

Akhvakh
- Ашвaлъи мицIи ašʷaƛi mic’ːi
- Pronunciation: [aʃʷat͡ɬi mit͡s’ːi]
- Native to: North Caucasus, Azerbaijan
- Region: Southern Dagestan, northern Azerbaijan
- Ethnicity: Akhvakh
- Native speakers: 7,521 in Dagestan (2020 census); 6,500 total (2006); 20,000 total (2007)
- Language family: Northeast Caucasian: Avar–Andic; Andic; Akhvakh–Tindi; Akhvakh
- Writing system: Cyrillic

Language codes
- ISO 639-3: akv
- Glottolog: akhv1240 Akhvakhic
- ELP: Akhvakh
- Akhvakh

- Akhvakh is classified as Definitely Endangered by the UNESCO Atlas of the World's Languages in Danger (2010).

The Akhvakh language (also spelled Axvax, Akhwakh) is a Northeast Caucasian language from the Avar–Andic branch. Ethnologue lists 210 speakers based on the 2010 census, but Magomedova and Abulaeva (2007) list 20,000 speakers of the language, and the 2021 Russian census gave 7,521 speakers in Russia. There are also some 1,000–2,000 speakers in Akhvakh-Dere, a village in Zagatala District, Azerbaijan. It is the most divergent out of all of the Andic languages.

== Dialects ==
Akhvakh has several dialects, though sources do not agree on the number. Ethnologue lists Kaxib, Northern Akhvakh and Southern Akhvakh (which can be further subdivided into the Tlyanub and Tsegob subdialects). Creissels (2010) lists Northern Akhvakh and three dialects of Southern Akhvakh (Cegob, Tljanub, and Ratlub). Glottolog considers the Northern and Southern dialects to be separate languages, noting that the Tsegob/Cegob dialet is not mutually intelligible with the Northern dialects without commenting on the Tlyanub/Tljanub or Ratlub dialects.

== Phonology ==
=== Consonants ===
Consonant phonemes of Akhvakh
		Labial	Dental			Alveolar				Palatal	Velar		Uvular		Pharyngeal	Glottal
		Labial	Dental			central		lateral		Palatal	Velar		Uvular		Pharyngeal	Glottal
		Labial	lenis	sib.	fortis	lenis	fortis	lenis	fortis	Palatal	lenis	fortis	lenis	fortis	Pharyngeal	Glottal
Nasal		m	n													
Plosive/ Affricate	voiced	b	d			d͡ʒ					ɡ		(ɢ͡ʁ)			
Plosive/ Affricate	voiceless	p	t	t͡s	t͡sː	t͡ʃ	t͡ʃː	t͡ɬ	t͡ɬː		k	kː	q͡χ	q͡χː		ʔ
Plosive/ Affricate	ejective	pʼ	tʼ	t͡sʼ	t͡sʼː	t͡ʃʼ	t͡ʃʼː	t͡ɬʼ	t͡ɬʼː		kʼ	kʼː	q͡χʼ	q͡χʼː		
Fricative	voiceless			s	sː	ʃ	ʃː	ɬ	ɬː	ç	x	xː			ħ/ʜ ^{[1]}	h
Fricative	voiced	v		z		ʒ					ɣ				ʕ/ʢ ^{[1]}	
Trill						r										
Approximant								l		j						

As with Avar, there are competing analyses of the distinction transcribed in the table with the length sign ⟨ː⟩. Length is part of the distinction, but so is articulatory strength, so they have been analyzed as fortis and lenis. The fortis affricates are long in the fricative part of the contour, e.g. [tsː] (tss), not in the stop part as in geminate affricates in languages such as Japanese and Italian [tːs] (tts). Laver (1994) analyzes e.g. t͡ɬː as a two-segment affricate–fricative sequence /t͡ɬɬ/ (/t𐞛ɬ/ = /t^{ɬ}ɬ/).

=== Vowels ===
Akhvakh has a standard five-vowel system /i e a o u/ with distinctive vowel length.

== Alphabet ==
A few publications have been made in the Akhvakh language, such as the newspaper Zaman "Time", published since the early 1930s, but for the most part speakers of Akhvakh have adopted Avar as their literary language. In the 2000s, an alphabet for Akhvakh was devised, and some publications, like the newspaper Ахвахцы — Ашвадо, have been published since then. The alphabet is as follows:

А а	Аᵸ аᵸ	Б б	В в	Г г	Гъ гъ	Гь гь	ГӀ гӀ	Д д	Е е
Еᵸ еᵸ	Ж ж	Дж дж	З з	И и	Иᵸ иᵸ	Й й	К к	Кк кк	Къ къ
КъӀ къӀ	Кь кь	КьӀ кьӀ	КӀ кӀ	КӀкӀ кӀкӀ	Л л	Лъ лъ	Лълъ лълъ	ЛъӀ лъӀ	ЛӀ лӀ
М м	Н н	О о	Оᵸ оᵸ	П п	ПӀ пӀ	Р р	С с	Сс сс	Т т
ТӀ тӀ	У у	Уᵸ уᵸ	Х х	Хх хх	Хъ хъ	ХъӀ хъӀ	Хь хь	ХӀ хӀ	Ц ц
Цц цц	ЦӀ цӀ	ЦӀцӀ цӀцӀ	Ч ч	Чч чч	ЧӀ чӀ	ЧӀчӀ чӀчӀ	Ш ш	Щ щ	Ъ ъ
Э э

== Grammar ==
=== Agreement classes ===
Akhvakh has three agreement classes. In the singular, these are human masculine, human feminine, and non-human. In the plural, there are only two—human plural and non-human plural. Akhvakh verbs agree with the absolutive argument (subject of an intransitive or object of a transitive.)

Consider the following examples, which show the general principles. In the first example, the intransitive verb 'run' shows feminine agreement because its subject, 'girl', is feminine. In the second example, the transitive verb 'cook' shows neuter agreement because its object, 'meat', is neuter.

Jaše-∅ q:'eɬ:-a j-et-e j-i:ni
girl-ABS home-LAT FEM-run-CVB:FEM FEM-go:IPFV
'The girl ran home.'

Ak:'o-de riɬ:'i b-iž-e q:'-e:ni.
wife-ERG meat N-eat-CVB:N eat-IPFV
'The wife cooked the meat and ate it.'

Note that in the second example, 'wife' is in the ergative case and appears to be the subject of both the verbs 'cook' and 'eat', but neither verb shows feminine agreement.

=== Cases ===
Akhvakh distinguishes between an absolutive (i.e., unmarked) and oblique stem. Case endings are attached to the oblique stem (which may, however, coincide with the absolutive). In the singular, the oblique stem is irregular and lexically determined, and there is free variation.

Akhvakh has an ergative-absolutive case-marking system. As the following examples (repeated from above) show, the transitive subject has the ergative case, while an intransitive subject has absolutive case. Absolutive case is not overtly marked by a suffix, and the ergative is formed with the suffix -de. However, when it follows a close vowel (in Akhvakh, /i, u/), contraction may occur:

jaše 'girl' > oblique stem jaše-ɬːi- > ergative jaše-ɬːi-de or jaše-ɬː-e

The noun phrase with absolutive case controls agreement on the verb:

Jaše-∅ q:'eɬ:-a j-et-e j-i:ni
girl-ABS home-LAT FEM-run-CVB:FEM FEM-go:IPFV
'The girl ran home.'

Ak:'o-de riɬ:'i b-iž-e q:'-e:ni.
wife-ERG meat N-eat-CVB:N eat-IPFV
'The wife cooked the meat and ate it.'

In addition to the ergative and absolutive cases, Akhvakh has eighteen other cases, for a total of twenty cases. The additional cases are

- dative
- genitive
- comitative
- purposive
- fifteen spatial cases, arrayed in five series of three.

The dative case marks indirect the indirect object. The most common suffix is -ƛa, but it is in free variation with -ƛaje. Similarly to the ergative case, it may contract when preceded by a close vowel, e.g., jaše 'girl' > oblique stem: jaše-ɬːi- > dative: jaše-ɬːi-ƛa or jaše-ɬː-a.

če-sːe ãɬi di-da dada-sːʷ-a o-t-ar
one-CONTR ram 1SG(GEN)-INT father-OBL.M-DAT N-send-PFV
"I sent one of the rams to my father"

The genitive case expresses possession. Northern Akhvakh has two variants: one with no specific marker, and one with the suffix -ƛːi. The former is used with male and human plural nouns, and the latter is used with female, neuter, and non-human plural nouns. Below is a partial paradigm for šoda "good":

	M	F	N	HPL	NPL
Nom	šoda-we	šoda-je	šoda-be	šoda-ji	šoda-re
Gen	šoda-sːu	šoda-ɬːi-ƛːi	šoda-ɬːi-ƛːi	šodi-lo	šodi-li-ƛːi

The comitative case is formed with the suffix -k'ena attached to the oblique stem, and denotes accompaniment e.g., di-k'ena 'with me'.

The 15 spatial cases are formed by the combination of an 'orientation' marker and a 'spatial case marker' (also called the 'localization' and 'direction' markers, respectively). The orientation marker immediately follows the oblique stem and denotes the orientation of the object, and the spatial marker denotes its type of movement (including no movement).There are 5 orientation markers (labeled OR_{1} through OR_{5} in Creissler (2009)), and 3 direction markers (locative, allative, and ablative).

	OR_{1}	OR_{2}	OR_{3}	OR_{4}	OR_{5}
Loc	-g-e	-χar-i	-qː-e	-ƛ’ː-i	-ƛː-i
All	-g-a(je)	-ƛːir-a(je)	-qː-a(je)	-ƛ’ː-a(je)	-ƛː-a(je)
Abl	-g-u(ne)	-χar-u(ne)	-qː-u(ne)	-ƛ’ː-u(ne)	-ƛː-u(ne)
