= Kvanada =

Kvanada Кванада
- Selo
- Location within Republic of Dagestan Location within Russia
- Coordinates: 42°33′N 46°10′E
- Country: Russia
- Region: Republic of Dagestan
- District: Tsumadinsky District
- Time zone: UTC+3:00

Kvanada (Russian: Кванада) is a rural locality (a selo) in Tsumadinsky District, Republic of Dagestan, Russia. Population: 1,116 (2021 census); 1,262 (2002 census); 1,309 (1989 Soviet census). There are 6 streets in this selo.

== Geography ==
It is located 5 km from Agvali (the district's administrative centre), 117 km from Makhachkala (capital of Dagestan) and 1,626 km from Moscow. Gigatli-Urukh is the nearest rural locality.
