= Proto-Avar-Andic =

Reconstructed proto-language of the Avar-Andic languages

Proto-Avar
- Reconstruction of: Avar-Andic languages
- Reconstructed ancestor: Proto-Northeast Caucasian language

Proto-Avar is the unattested, reconstructed proto-language of the Avar–Andic languages, part of the Northeast Caucasian languages.
