= Tindi language =

Northeast Caucasian language

Tindi
- Идараб мицци Idarab mittsi
- Pronunciation: [idarab mitsːi]
- Native to: North Caucasus
- Region: Southern Dagestan
- Ethnicity: Tindi people
- Native speakers: 4,500 (2020 census)
- Language family: Northeast Caucasian: Avar–Andic; Andic; Akhvakh–Tindi; Karata–Tindi; Botlikh–Tindi; Bagvalal–Tindi; Tindi

Language codes
- ISO 639-3: tin
- Glottolog: tind1238
- ELP: Tindi
- Tindi

- Tindi is classified as Definitely Endangered by the UNESCO Atlas of the World's Languages in Danger

Tindi is a Northeast Caucasian language spoken in the Russian republic of Dagestan. Tindis have no individual designation for their language, but those living in the village of Idar call their language Idarab mitstsi meaning 'the language of the Idar village'. It is only an oral language; Avar or Russian are used in written communication instead. Tindi vocabulary contains many loanwords from Avar, Turkish, Arabic, and Russian. It has approximately 4,500 speakers.

== Phonology ==
=== Vowels ===
There are 20 phonemic vowels in Tindi.

	Front	Central	Back
Close	i iː		u uː
Mid	e eː		o oː
Open		a aː	

Nasalized vowels may also exist as /ĩ, ẽ, ã, õ, ũ/ and as long-nasalized /ĩː, ẽː, ãː, õː, ũː/.

=== Consonants ===
		Labial	Dental		Alveolar				Palatal	Velar				Uvular		Pharyn- geal	Glottal
		Labial	Dental		central		lateral		Palatal	central		palatalized		Uvular		Pharyn- geal	Glottal
		Labial	lenis	fortis	lenis	fortis	lenis	fortis	Palatal	lenis	fortis	lenis	fortis	lenis	fortis	Pharyn- geal	Glottal
Nasal		m	n														
Plosive	voiceless	p	t							k	kː	kʲ	kʲː				
Plosive	ejective		tʼ							kʼ		kʲʼ					ʔ
Plosive	voiced	b	d							ɡ		ɡʲ					
Affricate	voiceless		t͡s	t͡sː	t͡ʃ	t͡ʃː		t͡ɬː							q͡χː		
Affricate	ejective		t͡sʼ	t͡sʼː	t͡ʃʼ	t͡ʃʼː		t͡ɬʼː							q͡χʼː		
Fricative	voiceless		s	sː	ʃ	ʃː	ɬ	ɬː	ç					χ	χː	ħ	h
Fricative	voiced		z		ʒ									ʁ		ʕ	
Trill					r												
Approximant		w	l						j								

== Orthography ==
Tindi is typically unwritten. A 2003 dictionary uses the following orthography:

А а	А̄ а̄	Аᵸ аᵸ	А̄ᵸ а̄ᵸ	Б б	В в	Г г	Г' г'	Гъ гъ
Гь гь	ГӀ гӀ	Д д	Е е	Еᵸ еᵸ	Е̄ е̄	Ж ж	Дж дж	З з
И и	Ӣ ӣ	Иᵸ иᵸ	Ӣᵸ ӣᵸ	Й й	К к	Кк кк	К' к'	Кк' кк'
КӀ кӀ	КӀ' кӀ'	Л л	Лъ лъ	Лъ' лъ'	Ллъ ллъ	ЛӀ лӀ	М м	Н н
О о	О̄ о̄	Оᵸ оᵸ	П п	С с	C̄ c̄	Т т	ТӀ тӀ	У у
Ӯ ӯ	Уᵸ уᵸ	Ӯᵸ ӯᵸ	Х х	Хх хх	Хъ хъ	Хь хь	Хь' хь'	ХӀ хӀ
Ц ц	Цц цц	ЦӀ цӀ	Ч ч	Чч чч	Ш ш	Щ щ	Ъ ъ	Э э
