= Godoberi, Botlikhsky District, Republic of Dagestan =

Godoberi Годобери Гъодобери
- Selo
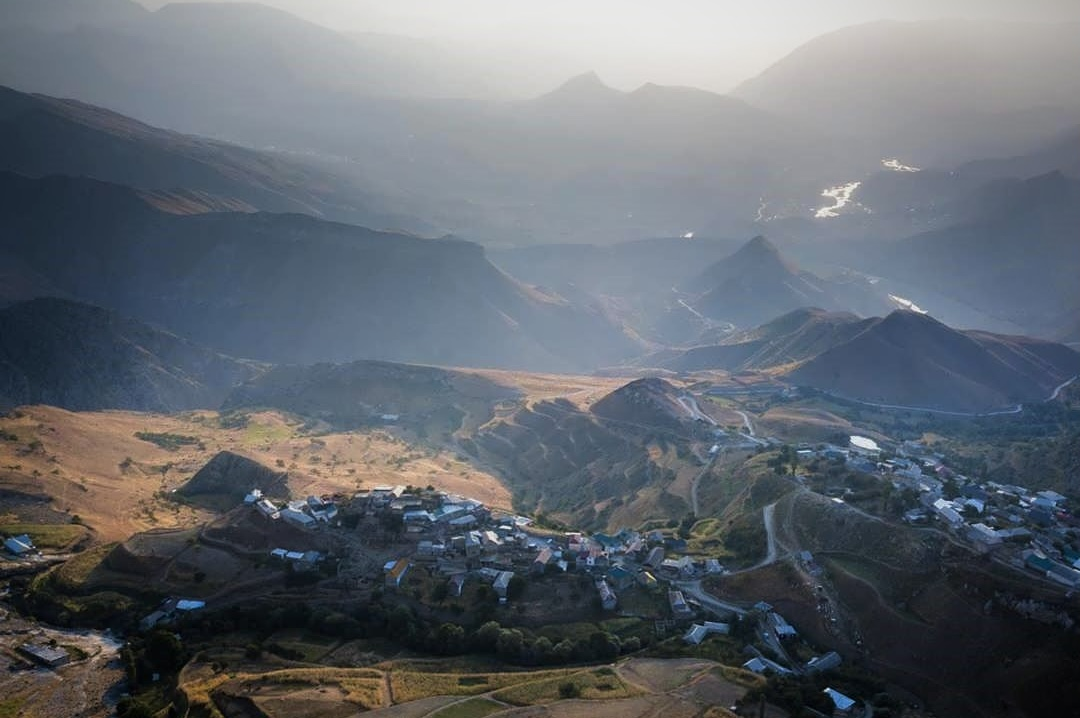

- Location within Republic of Dagestan Location within Russia
- Coordinates: 42°37′N 46°07′E
- Country: Russia
- Region: Republic of Dagestan
- District: Botlikhsky District
- Time zone: UTC+3:00

Godoberi (Russian: Годобери; Avar: Гъодобери) is a rural locality (a selo) and the administrative centre of Godoberinsky Selsoviet, Botlikhsky District, Republic of Dagestan, Russia. The population was 3,049 as of 2010. There are 30 streets.

== Geography ==
Godoberi is located 16 km southwest of Botlikh (the district's administrative centre) by road. Miarso is the nearest rural locality.
