= Zibirkhali =

Zibirkhali Зибирхали
- Selo
- Location within Republic of Dagestan Location within Russia
- Coordinates: 42°40′N 46°04′E
- Country: Russia
- Region: Republic of Dagestan
- District: Botlikhsky District

Zibirkhali (Russian: Зибирхали) is a rural locality (a selo) in Godoberinsky Selsoviet, Botlikhsky District, Republic of Dagestan, Russia. The population was 67 as of 2010.

== Geography ==
Zibirkhali is located 23 kilometres (14 mi) northwest of Botlikh (the district's administrative centre) by road. Shoroda is the nearest rural locality.
