= Andic languages =

Branch of the Northeast Caucasian language family

Andic
- Geographic distribution: Dagestan
- Linguistic classification: Northeast Caucasian: Avar–Andic; Andic
- Proto-language: Proto-Andic
- Subdivisions: Andi; Akhvakh–Tindi

Language codes
- Glottolog: andi1254

The Andic languages are a branch of the Northeast Caucasian language family. They are often grouped together with the Avar language and (formerly) with the Tsezic (Didoic) languages to form an Avar–Andic (or Avar–Andic–Didoic) branch of that family.

== Internal branching ==
Schulze (2009) gives the following family tree:

- Andic languages
  - Andi (Qwannab)
  - Akhvakh–Tindi
    - Akhvakh
    - Karata–Tindi
      - Karata (Kirdi)
      - Botlikh–Tindi
        - Botlikh
        - Godoberi
        - Chamalal
        - Bagvalal–Tindi
          - Bagvalal
          - Tindi
