= Chamalal language =

Northeast Caucasian language

Chamalal
- чамалалдуб мичӀчӀ çamalaldub miçʿçʿ
- Pronunciation: [t͡ʃʼamalaldub mit͡sʼ]
- Native to: North Caucasus
- Region: Southwestern Dagestan
- Ethnicity: Chamalal people
- Native speakers: 5,171 (2020)
- Language family: Northeast Caucasian: Avar–Andic; Andic; Akhvakh–Tindi; Karata–Tindi; Botlikh–Tindi; Chamalal

Language codes
- ISO 639-3: cji
- Glottolog: cham1309
- ELP: Chamalal
- Chamalal

- Chamalal is classified as Definitely Endangered by the UNESCO Atlas of the World's Languages in Danger (2010)

Chamalal (also called Camalal or Chamalin) is an Andic language of the Northeast Caucasian language family spoken in southwestern Dagestan, Russia by approximately 5,100 ethnic Chamalals. It has three quite distinct dialects, Gadyri, Gakvari, and Gigatl.

== Classification ==
Chamalal has three distinct dialects: Gadyri (Gachitl-Kvankhi), Gakvari (Agvali-Richaganik-Tsumada-Urukh), and Gigatl (Hihatl). There are also two more dialects: Kwenkhi, Tsumada.

=== Derived languages ===
Gigatl (Hihatl) and Chamalal proper (with Gadyri, Gakvari, Tsumada and Kwenkhi dialects) are considered to be sublanguages.

== Geographic distribution ==
The approximately 5000 ethnic speakers live in eight villages in the Tsumadinsky District on the left bank of the Andi-Koisu river in the Dagestan Republic and in the Chechnya Republic. The speakers are mostly Muslim, primarily following Sunni Islam since the 8th or 9th century.

=== Official status ===
There are no countries with Chamalal as an official language.

== History ==
Chamalal is spoken in southwestern Dagestan, Russia by indigenous Chamalals since the 8th or 9th century. The ethnic population is approximately 5,000, with around 5,100 speakers. The language has a 6b (threatened) status.

== Writing system ==
Chamalal is an unwritten language. Avar and Russian are used in school, and Avar is also used for literary purposes.

== Bibliography ==
- Anderson, Stephen (2005). "Review: The Indigenous Languages of the Caucasus, Vols. 1-4". Book Reviews. Language. 81 (4): 993–996. doi:10.1353/lan.2005.0161. JSTOR 4490030.
- "Back Matter". Historische Sprachforschung / Historical Linguistics. 109 (2). 1996. JSTOR 41288916.
- Blažek, Václav (2002). "The 'beech'-argument — State-of-the-Art". Historische Sprachforschung / Historical Linguistics. 115 (2): 190–217. JSTOR 41289089.
- Friedman, Victor (2005). "Review:The Indigenous Languages of the Caucasus, Volume 3: The North East Caucasian Languages, Part 1". The Slavic and East European Journal. 49 (3): 537–539. doi:10.2307/20058337. JSTOR 20058337.
- Greppin, John A. C. (1996). "New Data on the Hurro-Urartian Substratum in Armenian". Historische Sprachforschung / Historical Linguistics. 109 (1): 40–44. JSTOR 41288886.
- Harris, Alice C. (2009). "Exuberant Exponence in Batsbi". Natural Language & Linguistic Theory. 27 (2): 267–303. doi:10.1007/s11049-009-9070-8. JSTOR 40270318.
- Haspelmath, Martin (1996). "Review:The Indigenous Languages of the Caucasus, Vol. 4: North East Caucasian Languages, Part 2". Book Reviews. Language. 72 (1): 126–129. doi:10.2307/416797. JSTOR 416797.
- Kolga, M.; Tõnurist, I.; Vaba, L.; Viikberg, J. (1993). The Red book of the Peoples of the Russian Empire.
- Magomedova, P. T. (2004). "Chamalal". The Indigenous Languages of the Caucasus. Vol. 3: The North East Caucasian Languages, Part 1. pp. 3–65.
- Schulze, Wolfgang (2005). "Grammars for East Caucasian". Anthropological Linguistics. 47 (3): 321–352. JSTOR 25132340.
- Szczśniak, Andrew L. (1963). "A Brief Index of Indigenous Peoples and Languages of Asiatic Russia". Anthropological Linguistics. 5 (6): 1–29. JSTOR 30022425.
- Tuite, Kevin; Schulze, Wolfgang (1998). "A Case of Taboo-Motivated Lexical Replacement in the Indigenous Languages of the Caucasus". Anthropological Linguistics. 40 (3): 363–383. JSTOR 30028646.
- Voegelin, C. F.; Voegelin, F. M. (1966). "Index of Languages of the World". Anthropological Linguistics. 8 (6): i–xiv, 1–222.
