= Avar–Andic languages =

Northeast Caucasian language branch

Avar–Andic
- Geographic distribution: Dagestan
- Linguistic classification: Northeast Caucasian: Avar–Andic
- Proto-language: Proto-Avar-Andic
- Subdivisions: Andic; Avar

Language codes
- ISO 639-3: –
- Glottolog: None
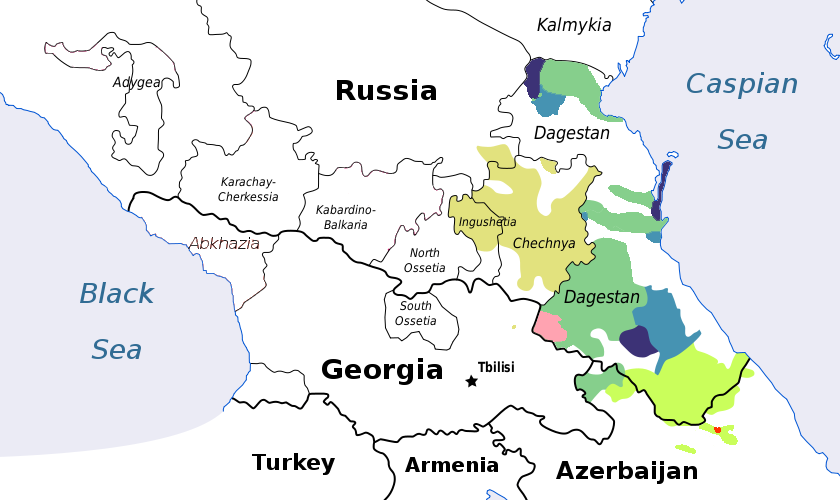
- Avar–Andic

The Avar–Andic languages form one of the seven main branches of Northeast Caucasian language family. It branches into the Andic languages and the Avar language. The latter, with 800,000 speakers, serves as a literary language for 60,000 speakers of the Andic branch as well as for speakers of the related Tsezic (Didoic) languages.

The table below shows regional dialects encompassed in the Avar-Andic languages, as well as other language groups in the Northeast Caucasian language family. Included are the Andic language, Akhvakh language, Bagvalal language, Botlikh language, Chamalal language, Godoberi language, Karata language, Tindi language, and Avar language.

All Avar–Andic languages are under some degree of lexical influence from Avar, with over 400 separate Avar roots represented in various Andic languages dating from earlier borrowings more universally represented across Andic to modern borrowings within recent memory owing to the use of Avar as a lingua franca; but this phenomenon is relatively mild for Andi and Akhvakh.

Main areas of Northeast Caucasian languages

== See also ==
- Languages of the Caucasus
