= Karata (rural locality) =

Rural locality in Dagestan, Russia

Coordinates: 42°35′47″N 46°20′23″E

Karata (Russian: Карата, Karata: КIкIаратIа) is a rural locality (a selo) and the administrative center of Akhvakhsky District of the Republic of Dagestan, Russia. Population: 4,153 (2010 census); 4,519 (2002 census); 2,591 (1989 Soviet census).
