= Akhvakhsky District =

Akhvakhsky District Ахвахский район (Russian)
- District

Other transcription(s)
  - Avar: Гӏахьвахъ мухъ
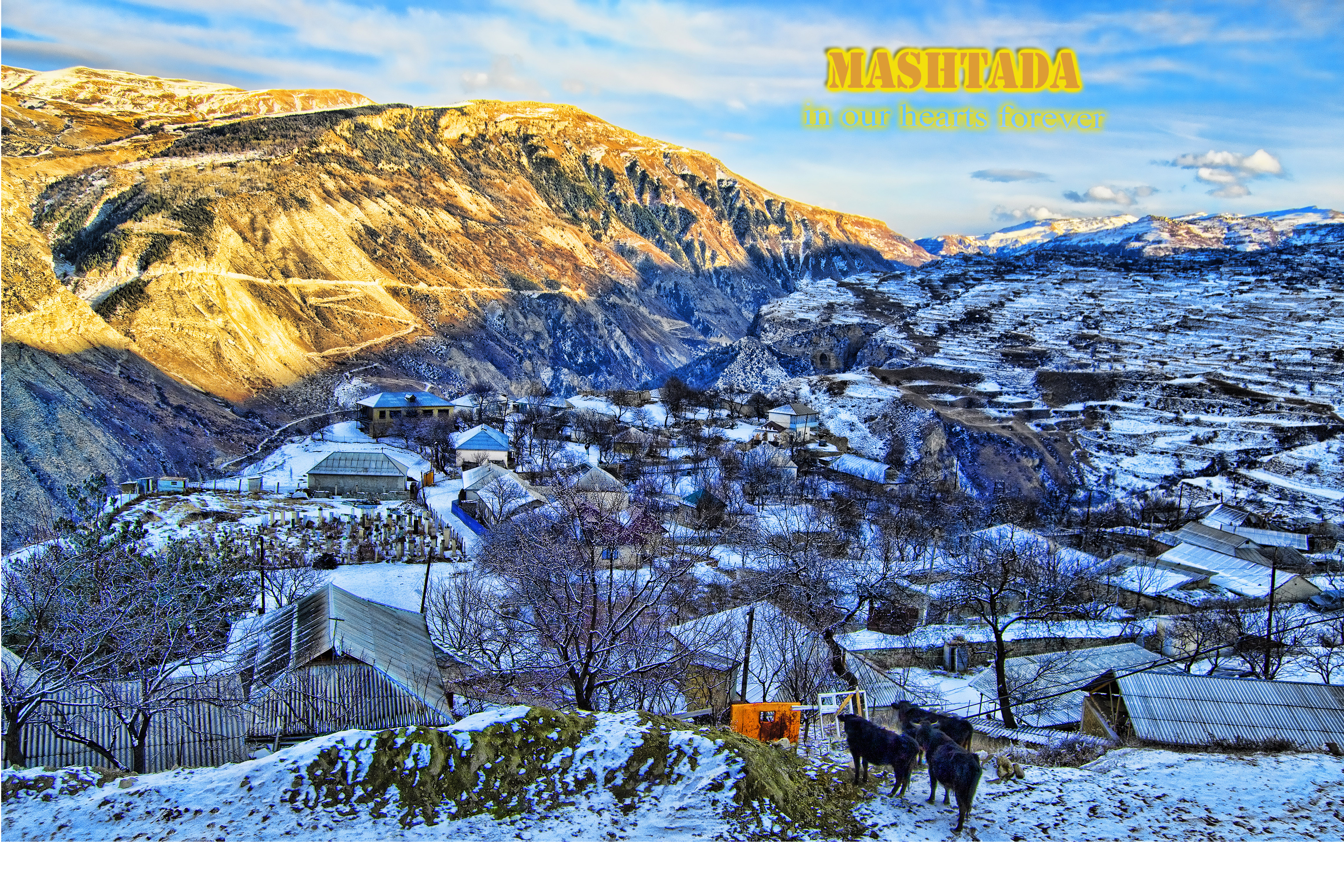
- Village Mashtada in Akhvakhsky District

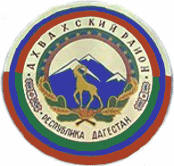
- Coat of arms
- Location of Akhvakhsky District in the Republic of Dagestan
- Coordinates: 42°35′N 46°21′E
- Country: Russia
- Federal subject: Republic of Dagestan
- Established: 1933
- Administrative center: Karata

Area
  - Total: 291.1 km^{2} (112.4 sq mi)

Population (2010 Census)
  - Total: 22,014
  - Density: 75.62/km^{2} (195.9/sq mi)
  - Urban: 0%
  - Rural: 100%

Administrative structure
  - Administrative divisions: 7 Selsoviets
  - Inhabited localities: 25 rural localities

Municipal structure
  - Municipally incorporated as: Akhvakhsky Municipal District
  - Municipal divisions: 0 urban settlements, 13 rural settlements
- Time zone: UTC+3 (MSK)
- OKTMO ID: 82605000
- Website: http://www.akhvakh.ru

Population of Akhvakhsky District
- 2010 Census: 22,014
- 2002 Census: 20,373
- 1989 Census: 10,421
- 1979 Census: 11,224

Akhvakhsky District (Russian: Ахвахский райо́н; Avar: Гӏахьвахъ мухъ) is an administrative and municipal district (raion), one of the forty-one in the Republic of Dagestan, Russia. It is located in the west of the republic. The area of the district is 291.1 square kilometers (112.4 sq mi). Its administrative center is the rural locality (a selo) of Karata. As of the 2010 Census, the total population of the district was 22,014, with the population of Karata accounting for 18.9% of that number.

== Administrative and municipal status ==
Within the framework of administrative divisions, Akhvakhsky District is one of the forty-one in the Republic of Dagestan. The district is divided into seven selsoviets which comprise twenty-five rural localities. As a municipal division, the district is incorporated as Akhvakhsky Municipal District. Its seven selsoviets are incorporated as thirteen rural settlements within the municipal district. The selo of Karata serves as the administrative center of both the administrative and municipal district.
