= Avar language =

Northeast Caucasian language

Avar
- Avaric, Awar
- اوار ماض, авар мацӀ, avar maⱬ; ماعارۇل ماض, магӀарул мацӀ, maⱨarul maⱬ
- Pronunciation: [ʔaˈwar mat͡sʼː] [maʕarul mat͡sʼː]
- Native to: North Caucasus, Azerbaijan
- Ethnicity: Avars
- Native speakers: 1,200,000 (2021)
- Language family: Northeast Caucasian: Avar–Andic; Avar
- Dialects: see below
- Writing system: Cyrillic (current); Georgian, Arabic, Latin (formerly)

Official status
- Official language in: Russia: Dagestan

Language codes
- ISO 639-1: av – Avaric
- ISO 639-2: ava – Avaric
- ISO 639-3: ava – inclusive code Avaric; Individual code: oav – Old Avar
- Glottolog: avar1256
- Avar

- Avar is classified as Vulnerable by the UNESCO Atlas of the World's Languages in Danger

Avar (авар мацӀ, avar maⱬ [ʔaˈwar mat͡sʼː] or магӀарул мацӀ, maⱨarul maⱬ [maʕarul mat͡sʼː], 'language of the mountains'), also known as Avaric, is a Northeast Caucasian language of the Avar–Andic subgroup that is spoken by Avars, primarily in Dagestan. In 2010, there were approximately one million speakers in Dagestan and elsewhere in Russia.

== Geographic distribution ==
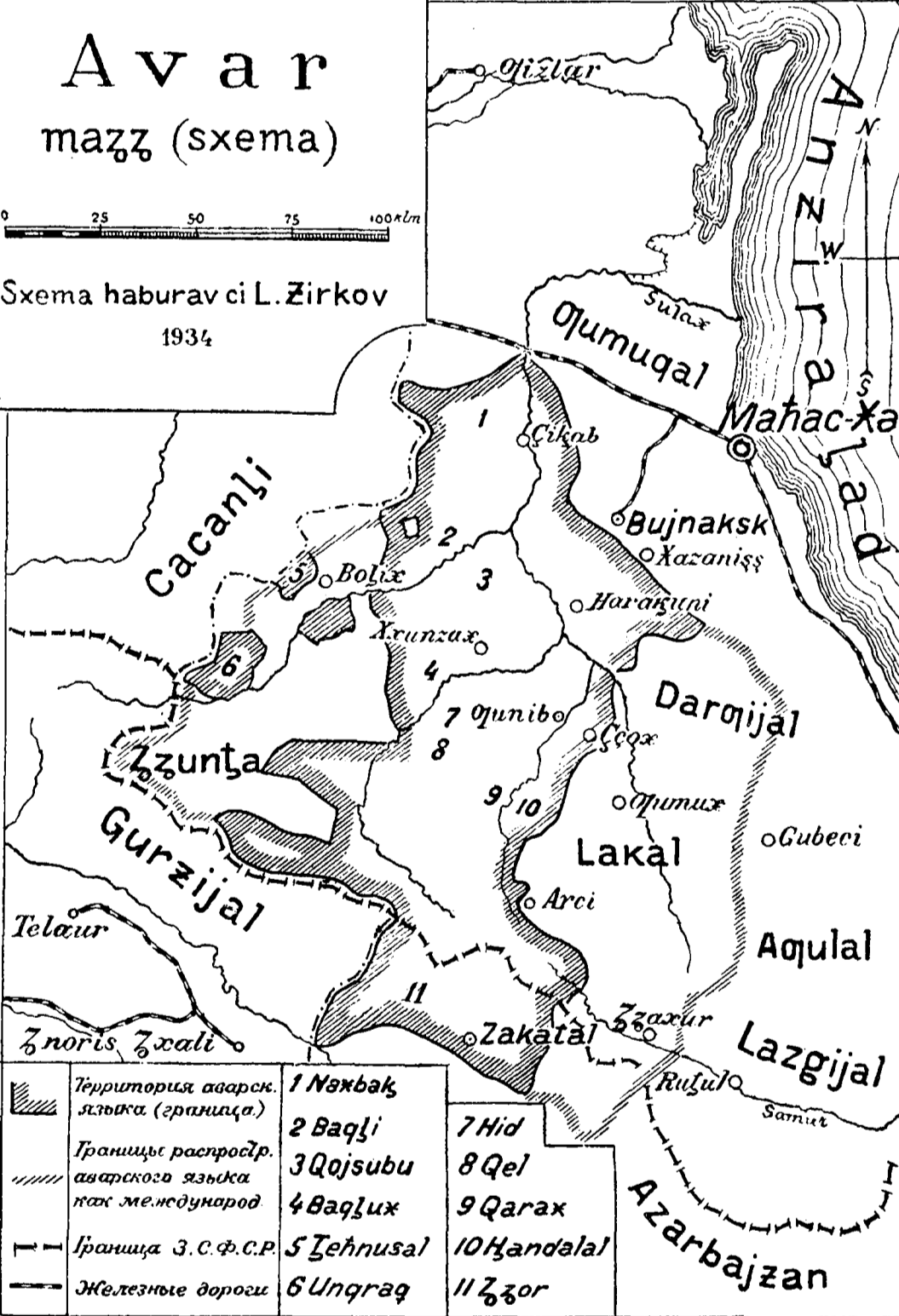
Territory and borders of distribution of the Avar language (in the Latin alphabet of the 1930s)

It is spoken mainly in the western and southern parts of the Russian Caucasus republic of Dagestan, and the Balaken, Zaqatala regions of north-western Azerbaijan. Some Avars live in other regions of Russia. There are also small communities of speakers living in the Russian republics of Chechnya and Kalmykia; in Georgia, Kazakhstan, Ukraine, Jordan, and the Marmara Sea and Maraş region of Turkey. It is spoken by about 1,200,000 people worldwide. UNESCO classifies Avar as vulnerable to extinction.

== Status ==
It is one of six literary languages of Dagestan, where it is spoken not only by the Avar, but also serves as the language of communication between different ethnic and linguistic groups.

== Dialects ==
Glottolog lists 14 dialects of Avar, some of which correspond to the villages where they are spoken. The dialects are listed in alphabetical order based on their name in Glottolog:

- Ancux (Antsukh / Анцух)
- Andalal-Gxdatl
- Bacadin
- Batlux
- Hid
- Karax
- Kaxib
- Keleb
- Salatav
- Shulanin
- Untib
- Xunzax (Khunzakh / Xунзах)
- Zakataly
- Zaqatala

== Phonology ==
Consonant phonemes of Avar
		Labial	Dental		Alveolar				Palatal	Velar		Uvular		Pharyngeal	Glottal
		Labial	Dental		central		lateral		Palatal	Velar		Uvular		Pharyngeal	Glottal
		Labial	lenis	fortis	lenis	fortis	lenis	fortis	Palatal	lenis	fortis	lenis	fortis	Pharyngeal	Glottal
Nasal		m	n												
Plosive	voiced	b	d							ɡ					
Plosive	voiceless	p	t							k	kː				ʔ
Plosive	ejective		tʼ							kʼ	kʼː				
Affricate	voiceless		t͡s	t͡sː	t͡ʃ	t͡ʃː		t͡ɬː					q͡χː		
Affricate	ejective		t͡sʼ	t͡sʼː	t͡ʃʼ	t͡ʃʼː		(t͡ɬʼː)					q͡χʼː		
Fricative	voiceless		s	sː	ʃ	ʃː	ɬ	ɬː		x	xː	χ	χː	ʜ	
Fricative	voiced		z		ʒ							ʁ		ʕ	ɦ
Trill					r										
Approximant		w					l		j						

There are competing analyses of the distinction transcribed in the table with the length sign ⟨ː⟩. Length is part of the distinction, but so is articulatory strength, so they have been analyzed as fortis and lenis. The fortis affricates are long in the fricative part of the contour, e.g. [tsː] (tss), not in the stop part as in geminate affricates in languages such as Japanese and Italian [tːs] (tts). Laver (1994) analyzes e.g. [t͡ɬː] as a two-segment affricate–fricative sequence [t͡ɬɬ] (/t𐞛ɬ/ = /t^{ɬ}ɬ/).

Avar Vowels
	Front	Back
High	i	u
Mid	e	o
Low	a	

Avar has five phonemic vowels: /a e i o u/.

=== Lexical accent ===
In Avar, accent is contrastive, free and mobile, independent of the number of syllables in the word. Changes in lexical accent placement indicate different semantic meaning and grammatical meanings of a word:

- ра́гӀи 'word' ~ рагӀи́ 'fodder'
- ру́гънал 'wound.nom.pl' ~ ругъна́л 'wound.gen.sg'

== Writing systems ==
There were some attempts to write the Avar language in the Georgian alphabet as early as the 14th century. The use of the Perso-Arabic script for representing Avar in marginal glosses began in the 15th century. The use of Arabic, which is known as ajam, is still known today.

Peter von Uslar developed a Cyrillic-based alphabet, published in 1889, that also used some Georgian-based letters. Many of its letters have not been encoded in Unicode. The alphabet takes the following form: а, б, в, г, ӷ, д, е, ж, һ,,, і, ј, к, қ,, л, м, н, о, п, ԛ,, р, с, ҫ, т, ҭ, у, х, х̍, хᷱ, ц,, / ц̓, / ꚑ, ч, ч̍, чᷱ, / ч̓, ш, ղ, ղ̓, ղᷱ,

As part of Soviet language re-education policies in 1928 the Ajam was replaced by a Latin alphabet, which in 1938 was in turn replaced by the current Cyrillic script. Essentially, it is the Russian alphabet plus one additional letter called palochka (stick, Ӏ), originally the digit 1 on a manual typewriter. The palochka is not included in common computer keyboard layouts, and is often replaced with a capital Latin letter i ( I ) or occasionally a small Latin letter L ( l ) rather than the digit 1.

=== Cyrillic alphabet ===
The Avar language is usually written in the Cyrillic script. The letters of the alphabet are (with their pronunciation given below in IPA transcription):

А а /a/	Б б /b/	В в /w/	Г г /ɡ/	Гъ гъ /ʁ/	Гь гь /h/	ГӀ гӀ /ʕ/	Д д /d/
Е е /e/, /je/	Ё ё /jo/	Ж ж /ʒ/	З з /z/	И и /i/	Й й /j/	К к /k/	Къ къ /q͡χʼː/
Кь кь /t͡ɬʼː/	КӀ кӀ /kʼ/	КӀкӀ кӀкӀ /kʼː/	Кк кк /kː/	Л л /l/	ЛӀ лӀ /t͡ɬː/	Лъ лъ /ɬ/	Лълъ лълъ /ɬː/
М м /m/	Н н /n/	О о /o/	П п /p/	Р р /r/	С с /s/	Сс сс /sː/	Т т /t/
ТӀ тӀ /tʼ/	У у /u/	Ф ф /f/	Х х /χ/	Хх хх /χː/	Хъ хъ /q͡χː/	Хь хь /x/	Хьхь хьхь /xː/
ХӀ хӀ /ħ/	Ц ц /t͡s/	Цц цц /t͡sː/	ЦӀ цӀ /t͡sʼ/	ЦӀцӀ цӀцӀ /t͡sʼː/	Ч ч /t͡ʃ/	Чч чч /t͡ʃː/	ЧӀ чӀ /t͡ʃʼ/
ЧӀчӀ чӀчӀ /t͡ʃʼː/	Ш ш /ʃ/	Щ щ /ʃː/	Ъ ъ /ʔ/	Ы ы /ɨ/	Ь ь /ʲ/	Э э /e/	Ю ю /ju/
Я я /ja/

=== Latin alphabet ===
The Avar Latin alphabet was originally monocameral. Capital letters were added later. Note that there is no distinction between a cedilla as in ⟨ţ⟩ and a straight tick as in ⟨ⱪ⟩; the graphic forms of the letters vary by publication, and k may have a cedilla or t a tick.

Latin	Cyrillic	Arabic	IPA
A a	А а	آ ,ا	/a/
B b	Б б	ب	/b/
C c	Ч ч	چ	/t͡ʃ/
Ꞓ ꞓ	ЧӀ чӀ	ڃ	/t͡ʃʼ/
D d	Д д	د	/d/
E e	Э э	ئې، ې	/e/
G ɡ	Г г	ڬ	/ɡ/
Ƣ ƣ	Гъ Гъ	غ	/ʁ/
H h	Гь гь	ﻫ	/h/
Ħ ħ	ХӀ хӀ	ح	/ħ/
Ⱨ ⱨ	ГӀ гӀ	ع	/ʕ/
I i	И и	ئێ، ێ	/i/
J j	Й й, Ь ь	ي	/j/, /Cʲ/
K k	К к	ك	/k/
Ⱪ ⱪ	КӀ кӀ	گ	/kʼ/
L l	Л л	ل	/l/
Ļ ļ	Лъ лъ	ڸ	/t͡ɬ/
Ꝉ̧ ꝉ̧	ЛӀ лӀ		/t͡ɬː/
M m	М м	م	/m/
N n	Н н	ن	/n/
O o	О о	ئۈ، ۈ	/o/
P p	П п	ف	/p/
Q q	Къ къ	ق	/q͡χʼː/
Ꝗ ꝗ	Кь кь	ڨ	/t͡ɬʼː/
R r	Р р	ر	/r/
S s	С с	س	/s/
Ꟊ ꟊ	Ц ц	ص	/t͡s/
Ş ş	Ш ш	ش	/ʃ/
T t	Т т	ت	/t/
Ţ ţ	ТӀ тӀ	ط	/tʼ/
U u	У у	ئۇ، ۇ	/u/
V v	В в	و	/w/, /Cʷ/
X x	Х х	خ	/χ/
Ҳ ҳ	Хь хь	ڮ	/x/
Ӿ ӿ	Хъ хъ	څ	/q͡χː/
Z z	З з	ز	/z/
Ƶ ƶ	Ж ж	ج	/ʒ/
Ⱬ ⱬ	ЦӀ цӀ	ض	/t͡sʼ/
ʼ	Ъ ъ	ئ	/ʔ/

=== Arabic alphabet ===
One feature of Avar Arabic alphabet is that similar to alphabets such as Uyghur and Kurdish, the script does not omit vowels and does not rely on diacritics to represent vowels when need be. Instead, modified letters with dot placement and accents have been standardized to represent vowels. Thus, Avar Arabic script is no longer an "impure abjad" unlike its parent systems (Arabic, Persian, and Ottoman), it now resembles a proper "alphabet".

While this was not the case for most of the several centuries during which Arabic alphabet has been used for Avar, this has become the case in the latest and most common conventions. This was indeed not the case at the time of writing of a linguistic article for the Journal of the Royal Asiatic Society in 1881.

Arabic	Cyrillic	Latin	IPA
ا	А а	A a	/a/
ب	Б б	B b	/b/
ت	Т т	T t	/t/
تُ	Тв тв	Tv tv	/tʷ/
ج	Ж ж	Ƶ ƶ	/ʒ/
جُ	Жв жв	Ƶv ƶv	/ʒʷ/
ڃ	ЧӀ чӀ	Ç ç	/t͡ʃʼ/
ڃُ	ЧӀв чӀв	Çv çv	/t͡ʃʷʼ/
‌ ڃّ	ЧӀчӀ чӀчӀ	Çç çç	/t͡ʃʼː/
‌ ڃُّ	ЧӀчӀв чӀчӀв	Ççv ççv	/t͡ʃʷʼː/
چ	Ч ч	C c	/t͡ʃ/
چُ	Чв чв	Cv cv	/t͡ʃʷ/
چّ	Чч чч	Cc cc	/t͡ʃː/
چُّ	Ччв ччв	Ccv ccv	/t͡ʃʷː/
ح	ХӀ хӀ	Ħ ħ	/ʜ/
حُ	ХӀв хӀв	Ħv ħv	/ʜʷ/
خ	Х х	X x	/χ/
خُ	Хв хв	Xv xv	/χʷ/
خّ	Хх хх	Xx xx	/χː/
خُّ	Ххв ххв	Xxv xxv	/χʷː/
څ	Хъ хъ	Ӿ ӿ	/q͡χː/
څُ	Хъв хъв	Ӿv ӿv	/q͡χʷː/
د	Д д	D d	/d/
دُ	Дв дв	Dv dv	/dʷ/
‌ ر	Р р	R r	/r/
‌ ز	З з	Z z	/z/
‌ زُ	Зв зв	Zv zv	/zʷ/
‌ س	С с	S s	/s/
‌ سُ	Св св	Sv sv	/sʷ/
‌ سّ	Сс сс	Ss ss	/sː/
‌ سُّ	Ссв ссв	Ssv ssv	/sʷː/
ش	Ш ш	Ş ş	/ʃ/
شُ	Шв шв	Şv şv	/ʃʷ/
شّ	Щ щ	Şş şş	/ʃː/
شُّ	Щв щв	Şşv şşv	/ʃʷː/
ص	Ц ц	Ꞩ ꞩ	/t͡s/
صّ	Цц цц	Ꞩꞩ ꞩꞩ	/t͡sː/
ض	ЦӀ цӀ	Ⱬ ⱬ	/t͡sʼ/
ضُ	ЦӀв цӀв	Ⱬv ⱬv	/t͡sʷʼ/
ضّ	ЦӀцӀ цӀцӀ	Ⱬⱬ ⱬⱬ	/t͡sʼː/
ضُّ	ЦӀцӀв цӀцӀв	Ⱬⱬv ⱬⱬv	/t͡sʷʼː/
ط	ТӀ тӀ	Ţ ţ	/tʼ/
طُ	ТӀв тӀв	Ţv ţv	/tʷʼ/
‌ ع	ГӀ гӀ	Ⱨ ⱨ	/ʕ/
غ	Гъ Гъ	Ƣ ƣ	/ʁ/
غُ	Гъв Гъв	Ƣv ƣv	/ʁʷ/
ف	П п	P p	/p/
ف	Ф ф	F f	/f/
ڣ	ПӀ пӀ	P p	/pʼ/
ق	Къ къ	Q q	/q͡χʼː/
قُ	Къв къв	Qv qv	/q͡χʷʼː/
ڨ	Кь кь	Ꝗ ꝗ	/t͡ɬʼː/
ڨُ	Кьв кьв	Ꝗv ꝗv	/t͡ɬʷʼː/
ك	К к	K k	/k/
كُ	Кв кв	Kv kv	/kʷ/
كّ	Кк кк	Kk kk	/kː/
كُّ	Ккв ккв	Kkv kkv	/kʷː/
گ	КӀ кӀ	Ⱪ ⱪ	/kʼ/
گُ	КӀв кӀв	Ⱪv ⱪv	/kʷʼ/
گّ	КӀкӀ кӀкӀ	Ⱪⱪ ⱪⱪ	/kʼː/
گُّ	КӀкӀв кӀкӀв	Ⱪⱪv ⱪⱪv	/kʷʼː/
ڬ	Г г	G g	/ɡ/
ڬُ	Гв гв	Gv gv	/ɡʷ/
ڮ	Хь хь	Ҳ ҳ	/x/
ڮُ	Хьв хьв	Ҳv ҳv	/xʷ/
ڮّ	Хьхь хьхь	Ҳҳ ҳҳ	/xː/
ل	Л л	L l	/l/
ڸ	Лъ лъ	Ļ ļ	/t͡ɬ/
ڸُ	Лъв лъв	Ļv ļv	/t͡ɬʷ/
ڸّ	Лълъ лълъ	Ļļ ļļ	/t͡ɬː/
ڸُّ	Лълъв лълъв	Ļļv ļļv	/t͡ɬʷː/
م	М м	M m	/m/
ن	Н н	N n	/n/
و	В в	V v	/w/
ئۈ، ۈ	О о	O o	/o/
ئۇ، ۇ	У у	U u	/u/
ﻫُ	Гьв гьв	Hv hv	/ɦʷ/
ﻫ	Гь гь	H h	/ɦ/
ئې، ې	Э э	E e	/e/
ئې، ې، يې	Е е	E e, Je je	/e/, /je/
ئێ، ێ	И и	I i	/i/
ئێ، ێ	Ы ы	Y y	/ɨ/
ي	Й й	J j	/j/
ي	Ь ь	J j	/ʲ/
يا	Я я	Ja ja	/ja/
يۈ	Ё ё	Jo, jo	/jo/
يۇ	Ю ю	Ju ju	/ju/
ئ	Ъ ъ	’	/ʔ/
ئُ	Ъв ъв	’v	/ʔʷ/

As an example, in Avar Arabic Script, four varieties of the letter yāʼ (ی) have been developed, each with a distinct function.

Varieties of "ی"
Arabic	Cyrillic	IPA	Function
ئ	/ ъ	/ʔ/	Used at the beginning of words starting with vowels "О о" [o], "У у" [u], "Э э" [e], and "И и" [i]. Has no sound of its own, but acts as "vowel carrier". Similar to writing conventions of Uyghur and Kurdish
ئې، ې	Э э / Е е	/e/	Similar letter exists in Pashto, Uzbek, and Uyghur orthographies.
ئێ، ێ	И и / Ы ы	/i~ɨ/	Similar letter exists in Kurdish orthography, but for the vowel [e].
ي	Й й	/j/	Equivalent to English "y" sound.

Nevertheless, Avar Arabic script does retain two diacritics.

First is "shadda" (ـّـ), used for gemination. While in Cyrillic, two back to back letters, including digraphs are written, in Arabic script, shadda is used.

Second diacritic in use in Avar Arabic script is ḍammah (ـُـ). In Arabic, Persian, and historically in Ottoman Turkish, this diacritic is used to represent [o] or [u]. But in Avar, this diacritic is used for labialization [◌ʷ] and not for any sort of vowel. So, it is the case that this diacritic is used in conjunction with a follow-up vowel. For example, the sound "зва" [zʷa] is written as "زُا".

This diacritic can optionally be used in conjunction with shadda. For example, the sound "ссвa" [sʷːa] is written as "سُّا".

If a word starts with a vowel, if it's an [a] sound, it is written with alif "ا". Otherwise, the vowel needs to be preceded by a "vowel carrier", which is hamza-ya' (ئـ). No need for such a carrier in the middle of words. Below table demonstrates vowels in Avar Arabic Script.

Vowel Table
А а	О о	У у	Э э / Е е	И и
[a]	[o]	[u]	[e]	[i]
Vowel at the beginning of a word
ا	ئۈ	ئۇ	ئېـ	ئێـ
Vowel in the middle or end of a word
ـا، ا	ـۈ، ۈ	ـۇ، ۇ	ېـ، ـېـ، ـې	ێـ، ـێـ، ـێ

=== Sample comparison ===
Arabic

نۈڸ ماڨێڸ وێڮانا، ڨالدا ڸۇق - ڸۇقۇن،
ڨۇردا كُېر ڃُان ئۇنېو، بێدا وېضّۇن دۇن؛
ڨۇرۇڬێ باطاڸۇن صېوې ئۇناڬۈ،
صۈ ڸارال راعالدا عۈدۈو كّۈلېو دۇن.
ڸار چُاخّۇلېب بۇڬۈ چابخێل گّالاڅان،
ڸێن گانضۇلېب بۇڬۈ ڬانڃازدا طاسان؛
طاراماغادێسېب قُال بالېب بۇڬۈ،
قۈ ڸێگێلان دێصا سۈعاب راڨالدا

Cyrillic

Нолъ макьилъ вихьана, кьалда лъукъ-лъукъун,
Кьурда квер чIван унев, бида вецIцIун дун;
Кьуруги батIалъун цеве унаго,
Цо лъарал рагIалда гIодов кколев дун.
Лъар чваххулеб буго чабхил кIкIалахъан,
Лъин кIанцIулеб буго ганчIазда тIасан;
ТIарамагъадисеб къвал балеб буго,
Къо лъикIилан дица согIаб ракьалда.

Latin

Noļ maꝗiļ viҳana, ꝗalda ļuq-ļuqun,
Ꝗurda кvеr çvan unеv, bida vеⱬⱬun dun;
Ꝗuruⱨ baţaļun s̶еvе unago,
Co ļaral raⱨalda ⱨodov ккolеv dun.
Łar cvaxxulеb bugo cabxil ⱪⱪalax̶an,
Łin ⱪanⱬulеb bugo gançazda ţaсan;
Ţaramaƣadiсеb qval balеb bugo,
Qo ļiⱪilan dis̶a сoⱨab raꝗalda.

== Morphosyntax ==
Avar is an agglutinative language, of SOV order.

Adverbs do not inflect, outside of inflection for noun class in some adverbs of place: e.g. the /b/ in /ʒani-b/ 'inside' and /t͡se-b-e/ 'in front'. Adverbs of place also distinguish locative, allative, and ablative forms suffixally, such as /ʒani-b/ 'inside', /ʒani-b-e/ 'to the inside', and /ʒani-sa/ 'from the inside'. /-go/ is an emphatic suffix taken by underived adjectives.

== Literature ==
The literary language is based on the болмацӀ (bolmaⱬ)—bo 'army, country' and maⱬ 'language'—the common language used between speakers of different dialects and languages. The bolmaⱬ in turn was mainly derived from the dialect of Khunzakh, the capital and cultural centre of the Avar region, with some influence from the southern dialects. Nowadays the literary language is influencing the dialects, levelling out their differences.

The most famous figure of modern Avar literature is Rasul Gamzatov, the People's Poet of Dagestan. Translations of his works into Russian have gained him a wide audience all over the former Soviet Union.

== Sample sentences ==
Cyrillic	Latin	Arabic	IPA	Meaning
ВорчӀами!	Vorçami!	!وۈرڃامێ	/wort͡ʃ’ami/	Hello!
Щиб хӀaл бугеб?	Şşib ħal bugeb?	شّێب حال بۇڬېب؟	/ʃːib ʜal bugeb/	How are you doing?
Иш кин бугеб?	Iş kin bugeb?	ئێش كێن بۇڬېب؟	/iʃ kin bugeb/	How are you?
Дуда цӀар щиб?	Duda ⱬar şşib?	دۇدا ضار شّێب؟	/duda t͡s’ar ʃːib/	What is your name?
Дур чан сон бугеб?	Dur can son bugeb?	دۇر چان سۈن بۇڬېب؟	/dur t͡ʃan son bugeb/	How old are you?
Mун киве ина вугев?	Mun kive ina vugev?	مۇن كێوې ئێنا وۇڬېو؟	/mun kiwe ina wugew/	Where are you going?
ТӀаса лъугьа!	Ţasa ļuha!	طاسا ڸۇﻫا!	/t’asa t͡ɬuɦa/	Sorry!
эбель	ebelj	ئېبېلې	/ebelʲ/	mother
эмен	emen	ئېمېن	/emen/	father
Киве гьитӀинав вас унев вугев?	Kive hiţinav vas unev vugev?	كێوې ھێطێناو واس ئۇنېو وۇڬېو؟	/kiwe ɦit’inaw was unew wugew/	Where is the little boy going?
Васас шиша бекана.	Vasas şişa bekana.	واساس شێشا بېكانا.	/wasas ʃiʃa bekana/	The boy broke a bottle.
Гьез нух бале (гьабулеб) буго.	Hez nux bale (habuleb) bugo.	ھېز نۇخ بالې (ھابۇلېب) بۇڬۈ.	/ɦez nuχ bale (ɦabuleb) bugo/	They are building the road.

== Sample text ==
Avar			Translation
Cyrillic	Latin	Arabic	Translation
Я, зобалазда вугев нижер Эмен, дур цӀар гӀадамаз мукъадасаблъун рикӀкӀаги, дур ПарччахӀлъи тӀаде щваги. Зобалаздаго гӀадин ракьалдаги дур амру билълъанхъаги. Жакъа нижер бетӀербахъиялъе хинкӀ-чед кье нижее. Нижер налъи-хӀакъалда тӀасаги лъугьа, нижерго налъулазда тӀаса нижги лъугьарал ругин. Нижер хӀалбихьизеги биччаге, Квешалдаса цӀуне ниж.	Ja, zobalazda wugew niƶer Emen, dur ⱬar ⱨadamaz muqadasabļun, riⱪⱪagi, dur Parccaħļi ţade şşvagi. Zobalazdago ⱨadin raꝗaldagi dur amru biļļanӿagi. Ƶaqa niƶer beţerbaӿijaļe xinⱪ-ced ꝗe niƶeje. Niƶer naļi-ħaqalda ţasagi ļuha, niƶergo naļulazda, ţasa niƶgi ļuharal rugin. Niƶer ħalbiҳizegi biccage, Kveşaldasa ⱬune niƶ	يا، زۈبالازدا وۇڬېو نێجېر ئېمېن، دۇر ضار عاداماز مۇقاداسابڸۇن رێگّاڬێ، دۇر پارچّاحڸێ طادې شُّاڬێ. زۈبالازداڬۈ عادێن راڨالداڬێ دۇر امرۇ بێڸّانڅاڬێ. جاقا نێجېر بېطېرباڅێياڸې جێنگ-چېدڨ ڨې نێجېيې. نێجېر ناڸێ-حاقالدا طاساڬێ ڸۇﻫا، نێجېرڬۈ ناڸۇلازدا طاسا نێجرێ ڸۇﻫارال رۇڬێن. نێجېر حالبێڮێزېڬێ بێچّارێ، کُێشالداسا ضۇنې نێج.	Our Father who art in heaven, hallowed be thy name. Thy kingdom come. Thy will be done, as in heaven, so on earth. Give us this day our daily bread, And forgive us our debts, as we also have forgiven our debtors. And bring us not into temptation, but deliver us from the evil one.

== See also ==
- Northeast Caucasian languages
- Languages of the Caucasus
