= Amir-Sultan I =

Nutsal of Avars
- Reign: XII centuries
- Predecessor: Amir-Ahmad ibn Chufan
- Successor: Malik Saratan II
- Issue: Malik Saratan II
- Father: Bayar II
- Religion: paganism, Christianity, Islam

Andunik (Avar: ГӏандуникӀ) or Amir-Sultan (Avar: ГӀамир-СултӀан I, late 12th – early 13th-centuries) was an Avar nutsal (ruler), who ruled in the 13th century and the son of Bayar II.

== Biography ==
According to the "Tarikhi Dagestan", about 40 years had passed since Masum bek came to power in Avar lands, by the time his great-grandson Amir-Ahmad ibn Chupan began to rule Khunzakh.

Approximately 30 years after the death of the nutsal (ruler) Abu Muslim, Amir-Sultan gathered an army from the Tsezes, Andians, Alans and others and with the help of his supporters in Khunzakh attacked the Ghazis. Among them was the ruler of Avar lands Amir-Ahmad ibn Chufan.

The ghazis fled and some of them were taken prisoner. All those Chechens, Tushetians and others who converted to Islam immediately turned away from him and joined nutsal, who in gratitude to the Chechens gave them the village of Rikvani in their personal possession.

During the capture of Khunzakh, the former ruler Amir-Ahmad was killed and beheaded, and his head was put on display. According to oral tradition, the Avars killed Amir-Akhmad in the place called Karchik, 4 km from the village of Batlaich, and then buried him on the outskirts of Khunzakh in the area called "Samilazul khior" (Avar: "Lake of the Samilakhs"). According to B. G. Mallachikhanov, the murder of Amir-Ahmad took place at the beginning of the 13th-century.

After that, the power of the old dynasty was restored in Khunzakh, the metropolis of the Georgian Orthodox Church was created in the mountainous Avaria, which was headed by the "Catholicos of the Khundz", probably as early as the third quarter of the 12th century.

However, the war did not end there and Amir Sultan had another 14 years (according to another version, 24 years), to fight against the Arabs. The Nutsaldom was taken into a blockade including an economic one, in the end peace was concluded, but with permission for the spread of Islam in the region. Tarikhi Dagestan reports that the Khundzakh people and their rulers converted to Islam 24 years after the assassination of Amir Ahmad ibn Chupan. Apparently then Andunik changed his name to Amir-Sultan.

== See also ==
- Bayar II
- Avar Khanate
- Sarir

== Sources ==
- Rafi, Muhammad. "Tarikhi Dagestan".
- Mallachikhanov B. (1965). On the issue of the Khazar Semender in Dagestan. Vol. 14. Historical series. Makhachkala: Institute of History, Language and Literature of the Dagfilial of the Academy of Sciences of the USSR. Historical series. pp. 194–195.
- Magomedov, Rasul (1977). Through the villages of Dagestan. Makhachkala: Дагучпедгиз. pp. 44, 85.
- Kazambiyev, Patimat (2016). "The Avar Khanate in the history of Dagestan: a historical digression". Историческая и социально-образовательная мысль. 8 (6–2): 44–47. ISSN 2075–9908.
