= Saratan I =

Nutsal of Avars
- Reign: XI century
- Predecessor: Uruskhan
- Successor: Surakat I
- Born: Khunzakh, Sarir
- Issue: Surakat I, Kakhru
- Father: Uruskhan

Saratan I or Sirtan (11th-century) was a nutsal (ruler) of the state formation Avar Nutsaldom.

== Origin ==
In the historical chronicle of Muhammad Rafi (XIV century) "Tarikhi Dagestan" a genealogy is given in which Sirtan is called the son of Uruskhan and their origin goes back to the ruler Abuhosro.

== Biography ==
In "Tarikhi Dagestan" it is said that the penultimate pre-Islamic ruler of Avar lands was Prince Surakat, who had an ancient Arabic name and was the son of Saratan. According to the “History of the village of Argvani”, the named Surakat ruled between 1038–39 and 1247–48, according to some data in the 11th-century, according to others in the 12th-century. If Saratan lived in the first half of the 13th century, then his ancestor Uruskhan falls on the 7th century, in the period before the Arab invasion.

The medieval Christian Dagestan state of Sarir began to fall apart due to confrontation and internal wars between the inhabitants of Christians, Jews, pagans and Muslims. In the 11th century, its western lands (modern Botlikh, Tsumadin and Akhvakh districts) broke away from Sarir, which were formed into the Andi possession. According to E. M. Schilling, “the entire territory along the left bank of the Andi Koysu river is considered as belonging to Zhugyutkhan (literally “Jewish Khan”), and the right-bank lands belong to Surakat of Avar.” “According to the historical legends of the Andi valley village of Muni,” wrote M. A. Aglarov, “there once existed a vast state, headed by Zhugyut Khan".

Nutsal Saratan received tribute from the subject population in Dagestan itself and beyond. The River al-Ghanam (Arabic: "Sheep River"), which crosses Avar lands and which is large freezing in winter and flows into the Caspian Sea Vladimir Minorsky identifies with Sulak river. At the outlet of the Sulak River from the mountain gorges to the Caspian plain, the northern capital, the ancient town of Gelbach was located.

Saratan was succeeded by his son Surakat I, who ruled not from Khunzakh, but from Tanusi, while Surakat's brother, another son of Saratan named Kakhru had a residence in Gelbakh.

== See also ==
- Surakat I
- Avar Khanate
- Avars (Caucasus)
- History of Dagestan

== Sources ==
- Rafi, Muhammad. "Tarihi Dagestan — History of Dagestan".
- Semyonov, Nanu (1895). Natives of the northeastern Caucasus. St. Petersburg. p. 502.
- Bakikhanov, Abbasgulu. "Golestan-e Eram (The Blooming Flower Garden)". Baku: Elm. p. 31.
- Aliev, Bagmomed (2002). "The struggle of the peoples of Dagestan against foreign invaders". Makhachkala. ISBN 5-94434-009-6.
