= Andi, Republic of Dagestan =

Village in Dagestan, Russia

Andi Анди
- Village
- Interactive map of Andi
- Coordinates: 41°41′N 23°50′E
- Country: Russia
- Federal subject: Dagestan
- District: Botlikh

Population (2010)
  - Total: 5,591
- Time zone: UTC+3 (MSK)
- Postal Code: 368983

Andi is a large village in the Botlikh region in Dagestan, Russia

== Geographical location ==
Located 14 km north-east of the village Botlikh.

== Population ==
The villagers are Andis (censuses may be marked as Avars). Before the deportation, a large number of Chechens lived there, including the Kharchievs, Sultanovs, Izrailovs, Makhmudovs, Mamaevs, Musalaevs, Apraev-Mamedov, Valiev, Gelegaev, Guchigov, Abdukerimov, Gelichaev, Mamedkhanov.

== Language ==
The villagers speak the Andi language. In 1981, a linguistic expedition Department of Theoretical and Applied Linguistics of the Faculty of Philology, Moscow State University was led by A. E. Kibrika.

== Famous natives ==
- Khizri Amirkanovich Amirkhanov — Soviet and Russian archaeologist, a specialist in the Paleolithic of the Caucasus and the Middle East.
- Murtzali Rasulovich Kazanalipov — fighter of the self-defense detachment of his native village, Hero of the Russian Federation (1999, posthumous).
- Umakhan Magomedgadzhievich Umakhanov – deputy of the State Duma of the Federal Assembly of the Russian Federation of the VI convocation.

== Sources ==
- "Andi: Photograph".
