= Gunkha =

Gunkha Гунха
- Village
- Interactive map of Gunkha
- Coordinates: 46°47′N 46°16′E
- Country: Russia
- Federal subject: Dagestan
- District: Botlikh

Population (2010)
  - Total: 128
- Time zone: UTC+3 (MSK)
- Postal Code: 368983

Gunkha is a small village in Botlikh district in Dagestan, Russia

== Geography ==
It is located 14 km northeast of the village Botlikh, on the left bank of the Unsatlen River.

== Demographics ==
The villagers speak the Andi language. In 1981, a linguistic expedition Department of Structural and Applied Linguistics of the Faculty of Philology MSU led by A. E. Kibrika.
