= Chanko (village) =

Chanko Чанко́
- Village
- Interactive map of Chanko
- Coordinates: 42°43′N 46°14′E
- Country: Russia
- Federal subject: Dagestan
- District: Botlikh

Population (2010)
  - Total: 488
- Time zone: UTC+3 (MSK)
- Postal Code: 368979

Chanko is a village in Botlikh district in Dagestan, Russia.

== Geographical location ==
It is located 6 km north of the Botlikh Village, on the left bank of the Chankovskaya river.

== Notable people ==
- Anvar Ibragimgadzhiyev (born 1991) - Russian footballer.
- Magomed Zaynukov (born 1995) - MMA fighter.

== Language ==
The villagers speak the Andi language. In 1981, a linguistic expedition was undertaken by the Department of Structural and Applied Linguistics of the Faculty of Philology MSU led by A. E. Kibrika.
