= Gagatli =

Gagatli Гагатли ГъагъалӀ
- Village
- Interactive map of Gagatli
- Coordinates: 42°48′N 46°17′E
- Country: Russia
- Federal subject: Dagestan
- District: Botlikh

Population (2010)
  - Total: 5,591
- Time zone: UTC+3 (MSK)
- Postal Code: 368984

Gagatli (Russian: Гагатли; Avar: ГъагъалӀ) is a village in Botlikh district in Dagestan, Russia

== Geographical location ==
It is located 14 km northeast of the village Botlikh.

== Language ==
The villagers speak the Andi language. In 1981, a linguistic expedition was undertaken by the Department of Structural and Applied Linguistics of the Faculty of Philology MSU led by A. E. Kibrika.
