= Bayar II =

Nutsal of Avars
- Reign: XII centuries
- Predecessor: Abu Muslim
- Successor: Masum-bek
- Issue: Andunik (Amir-Sultan)
- Father: Surakat I
- Religion: paganism, Islam

Bayar or Baysar, also Bayar-Abbas, Bayrampas (Avar: Байcар, Байар, 12th-century), was an Avar nutsal (ruler), who ruled in the 12th century and the son of previous ruler Surakat I.

== Biography ==
One of the legends says that during the reign of his father Surakat in Khunzakh a detachment of ghazis led by Abu Muslim invaded the Avar lands. The Khunzakh people did not want to convert to Islam and in the place called Achisal there was a major battle between them and the Arab troops. Surakat died during the battle and his son Bayar fled to Tusheti region.

After the inhabitants of Khunzakh converted to Islam, they were ruled by one of the descendants of Sheikh Ahmad named Masum bek, who was replaced by Sheikh Abu Muslim with the titles of Imam, wali and hakim. Bayar, who fled to Georgian lands recruited an army there and periodically attacked the Arabs. Thus, with varying success the struggle lasted for 40 years, until the Muslims finally gained the upper hand.

== See also ==
- Amir-Sultan I
- Surakat I
- Avar Khanate
- Sarir

== Sources ==
- Rafi, Muhammad. "Tarikhi Dagestan".
- Aliev, B. G. (2002). Borʹba narodov Dagestana protiv inozemnykh zavoevateleĭ : istochniki, predanii︠a︡, legendy, geroiko-istoricheskie pesni (in Luxembourgish). Makhachkala: Izd-vo tip. Dagestanskogo nauch. t︠s︡entra RAN. ISBN 5-94434-009-6. OCLC 53218875.
- Krishtopa, A. E.; Криштопа, А. Е. (2007). Dagestan v XIII--nachale XV vv. : ocherk politicheskoĭ istorii (in Luxembourgish). Moskva: Mamont. ISBN 978-5-903011-17-9. OCLC 191049209.
