= Kvanxidatl =

Kvankhidatl Кванхидатли Кванхидалъ
- Village
- Location within Republic of Dagestan Location within Russia
- Coordinates: 42°46′N 46°18′E
- Country: Russia
- Federal subject: Dagestan
- District: Botlikh

Population (2010)
  - Total: 887
- Time zone: UTC+3 (MSK)
- Postal Code: 368984

Kvanxidatl (Russian: Кванхидатли; Avar: Кванхидалъ) is a small village in the Botlikh district in Dagestan, Russia

== Geographical location ==
It is located 15 km northeast of the Botlikh village, on the Unsatlen River.

== History ==
In 1947, the village was liquidated, and the population was relocated to the village of Konkhidatli, Vedeno district. Restored in 1958 in connection with the return of residents. However, part of the villagers did not return, but founded the village of Dzerzhinskoye in the Khasavyurt district on the site of the former Kumyk farm Adil-otar.

== Language ==
Villagers speak Andi. In 1981, a linguistic expedition Department of Structural and Applied Linguistics of the Faculty of Philology MSU led by A. E. Kibrika

== Sources ==
- Photo of the village
