= Rikvani =

Rikvani Риквани РикIвани
- Village
- Interactive map of Rikvani
- Coordinates: 42°46′N 46°18′E
- Country: Russia
- Federal subject: Dagestan
- District: Botlikh

Population (2010)
  - Total: 717
- Time zone: UTC+3 (MSK)
- Postal Code: 368984

Rikvani (Russian: Риквани; Avar: РикIвани) is a small village in Botlikh district in Dagestan, Russia

== Geographical location ==
It is located 14 km northeast of the village Botlikh, on the left bank of the Unsatlen River.

== Language ==
The villagers speak their own dialect of the Andi language. In 1981, a linguistic expedition Department of Structural and Applied Linguistics of the Faculty of Philology MSU led by A. E. Kibrik visited the village.
