= Botlikh =

Botlikh or Botlix may refer to:

- Botlikh people, one of the people of the Republic of Dagestan, Russia
- Botlikh language, spoken by the Botlikh people
- Botlikh (rural locality), a rural locality (selo) in the Republic of Dagestan, Russia
