= Ashali =

Ashali Ашали́ ГӀашали
- Village
- Interactive map of Ashali
- Coordinates: 46°47′N 46°16′E
- Country: Russia
- Federal subject: Dagestan
- District: Botlikh

Population (2010)
  - Total: 815
- Time zone: UTC+3 (MSK)
- Postal Code: 368984

Ashali (Russian: Ашали; Avar: ГӀашали) is a small village in Botlikh district in Dagestan, Russia

== Geography ==
It is located 14 km northeast of the village Botlikh, on the left bank of the Unsatlen River.

== Demographics ==
The villagers speak the Andean language. In 1981, a linguistic expedition Department of Structural and Applied Linguistics of the Faculty of Philology MSU led by A. E. Kibrika.
