= Abuhosro =

Nutsal of Avars and Tusheti
- Reign: mid-VIII century
- Predecessor: unknown
- Successor: Khosro
- Issue: Khosro
- Religion: Christianity

Abuhosro or Abu-Khusro, also Abuhisro and Abuhuasro was the ruler of the state formation Sarir (modern-day Dagestan) in the middle of the 8th century and during the reign of which caliph Marwan II invaded Dagestan.

== Etymology ==
His name is first found in the Georgian work “Historical Chronicle of Pseudo-Juansher”, which says that in the 8th century Tushetians, as well as “Khunz and all pagans of those places” were ruled by prince Abuhosro, to whom the “Historical Chronicle” gives the Georgian title eristavi – "duke". The second part of the name Abuhosro – "hosro" – means in translation from the Persian language "ruler, king" or the own Persian name Khosrov. The first part of the name is "Abu" – is the Arabic word for "father"; part of the Arabic name (kunya), meaning "father of". Forms a gender descending patronymic for the first-born son, thus it turns out that he was the father of his eldest son, whose name was Hosro, but his own name is unknown, who subjugated the ruler of the Khundzia in 739.

== Origin ==
In the genealogy of the Avar Nutsals (rulers) in the historical chronicle of Muhammad Rafi (14th century) “Tarikhi Dagestan”, the first in the long list of the ancestors of Saratan Khan is Arskan (also called Aruskhan, Araskhan or Uruskhan (the latter literally translates as “Russian Khan”)). In the annals of the Ghazi campaign on the "Shubut" society, Urus is directly named the father of Saratan, and that they are the descendants of Abu-Khusro. "Abuhosro" in the Georgian source "Pseudo-Juansher" appears as "a descendant of the rulers of the highlands."

== History ==
In the Georgian source “Historical Chronicle of Pseudo-Juansher” it is said that in the era of Marwan’s campaigns, who subdued Khunzakh in 739, Archil of Kakheti, the son of Stephen, was the ruler of the Caucasus and adjacent territories in Georgia, and his contemporary was the ruler of the Sarir people – Abukhosro. In the above-mentioned work it is reported that after the departure of Marwan II from Georgia, king Archil arrived in Kakheti. It is further said that at that time, prince Abuhosro, to whom the “Historical Chronicle” gives the Georgian title of eristavi (duke), ruled over the people of Tusheti, which located in the upper reaches of the Andean Koisu, as well as ruled over “Khunz and all the pagans of those places”. At that time, prince Abukhosro also owned the Tsuketi region, usually identified with the basin of the Kurmukhchay river.

The king Archil did not express a desire to take away his lands from Abuhosro. Instead, he built a fortified city of Nukhpati in the interfluve, but the caliph came and exterminated the Nukhpats”. Researcher G. Geybullaev identifies "Nukhpati" – a fortress in the interfluve - with the Avar village of Nukhbik, which is about 25 km (15.5 mi) south of the modern city of Zaqatala.

The last place where his name is mentioned in the chronicler is that approximately 50 years after chaliph Marwan's campaign against Georgia, that is, between 785 and 787 the Georgian ruler Archil created an interesting marriage union. He “married off a woman from the clan of Abukhosro” (according to another version, the wife of Abukhosro), to one of the relatives of the South Georgian sovereign princes who bore the Iranian title of pitiakhsh (vice-king).

== See also ==
- Sarir
- Dagestan
- Avar Khanate

== Sources ==
- Bagrationi, Vakhushti. "Description of the Kingdom of Georgia".
- Janashvili, Mose (1887). News of Georgian chronicles and historians about the North Caucasus. Tbilisi. p. 10.
- Juansheriani, Juansher (1986). Life of Vakhtang Gorgasali. Tbilisi: Мецниереба. p. 64.
- Rafi, Muhammad (2014). "Tarihi Dagestan — History of Dagestan".
