= Datuna =

Datuna (Georgian: დათუნა) is a name of Georgian origin, a diminutive of the name David.

Datuna may refer to:

- Datuna (village), a village in Dagestan, Russia
- Datuna Church, 10th century Georgian church in Russia

As a given name:

- David Rakviashvili, former Secretary of the National Security Council of Georgia
- Prince David of Kakheti (c. 1612–1648), a prince of the Georgiam Kingdom of Kakheti

As a surname:

- David Datuna (born 1974), Georgian-American artist
