= Surakat I =

Nutsal of Avars
- Reign: XI—XI centuries
- Predecessor: Saratan I
- Successor: Bayar
- Issue: Andunik, Bayar
- Father: Saratan I
- Religion: Unclear, see Religion

Surakat I or Suraka (Avar: Суракъат I, 12th-century) was an Avar nutsal (ruler), who ruled in the 11th–13th and the son of previous ruler Saratan.

== Origin ==
The discussion about the dates of Surakat's life has not yet been fully resolved. There are various opinions, which are mainly based on Arabic sources. Most authors say that Surakat lived most likely at the end of the 11th – beginning of the 12th century. Amri Shikhsaidov and Alexander Crishtopa based on the message of the historical work "The story of Argvani" suggests that he was born around 1190 and died in 1250 years, a few years before the first campaign of the ghazis on Khunzakh.

== Biography ==
According to the "Notes of the Imperial Geographical Society", Surakat "ruled over the peoples from Shamakhi to the borders of Kabarda region and the Chechens and Tushi were in dependence on him".

Muhammad Rafi writes about Surakat in "Tarikhi Dagestan" that he was the lord of the Avar lands, an apostate strong tyrant, a bearer of evil, violence and misfortune with the title nutsal (ruler) – the son of Sirtan. Not getting along with the Khunzakh people, he together with his warriors, servants and slaves moved to the remote village of Tanusi from Khunzakh.

19th-century scientist Abbasgulu Bakikhanov writes that "in the city of Tanusi, the ancient capital of Avar lands there was a powerful and formidable emir, whose name was Suraka and he owning lands from the borders of Shamakhi to the lands of the Chechens, levied tribute from all principalities and societies in cash, livestock, goods, bread, fruits and even chicken eggs”. The notes also say that "Avars were already then, as now, the leading people in Dagestan and gave the Arabs a long and bloody rebuff".

One of the legends says that during the reign of Surakat in Khunzakh, its population professed Christianity. During his reign, a detachment of ghazis led by Abu Muslim invaded the Avar lands. The Khunzakh people did not want to convert to Islam and a major battle took place between them and the Arab troops in the place named "Achisal". As a result of the battle Surakat died and his son Bayar fled to Tusheti (according to another version, he survived and fled to Tusheti too) and began to rule in their lands Masumbey from the family of Sheikh Ahmad, a descendant of Hamza, the uncle of the prophet Muhammad

== Religion ==
According to Abbasgulu Bakikhanov, Surakat is a convert from Muslims to pagans, according to another version, to Christianity. Regarding the faith of Surakat and the entire population of Nutsaldom, the majority indicates that the population was Christian of the Georgian-Greek Orthodox Church. In the "Tarikhi of Dagestan", Surakat is simply called "infidel", that is, not a Muslim, but the population as idolaters. In the later compiled sources of the "Chronicle of the Nakhchu Tribe" and "Tarikhi Argvani" of the 18th century, he and his brother are called Jews at all. However, in the village of Khunzakh two Arabic inscriptions were found on a local stone of Islamic content, which according to the handwriting can be attributed to the 11th–12th centuries.

== See also ==
- Avar Khanate
- Sarir
- Avars

== Sources ==
- Rafi, Muhammad. "Tarihi Dagestan — History of Dagestan".
- Bakikhanov, Abbasgulu. "Golestan-e Eram (The Blooming Flower Garden)". Baku: Elm. p. 31.
- Записки Кавказского отдела Императорского русского географического общества — Notes of the Caucasian Department of the Imperial Russian Geographical Society. Vol. 7 (1st ed.). Tbilisi. 1866. p. 52.
- Aitberov, Timur; Ivanov A. A. (1981). New Arabic inscriptions of the 12th–16th centuries. from Dagestan // Written monuments and problems of the history of culture of the peoples of the East. pp. 38–41.
- Aliev, Bagmomed (2002). "The struggle of the peoples of Dagestan against foreign invaders". Makhachkala. ISBN 5-94434-009-6.
