= Kheleturi =

Kheleturi Хелетури
- Selo
- Location within Republic of Dagestan Location within Russia
- Coordinates: 42°36′N 46°13′E
- Country: Russia
- Region: Republic of Dagestan
- District: Botlikhsky District
- Time zone: UTC+3:00

Kheleturi (Russian: Хелетури) is a rural locality (a selo) and the administrative centre of Kheleturinsky Selsoviet, Botlikhsky District, Republic of Dagestan, Russia. The population was 721 as of 2010. There are 9 streets.

== Geography ==
Kheleturi is located 11 km south of Botlikh (the district's administrative centre) by road. Alak is the nearest rural locality.
