= Andunik I =

Nutsal of Avars
- Reign: 1460 — 1485
- Predecessor: Muhammed-Mirza
- Successor: Bulach I
- Died: 1485
- Father: Ibrahim I
- Religion: Islam

Andunik I (Avar: ГӀандуникӀ I) was an Avar nutsal (ruler), who ruled from 1460 to 1485.

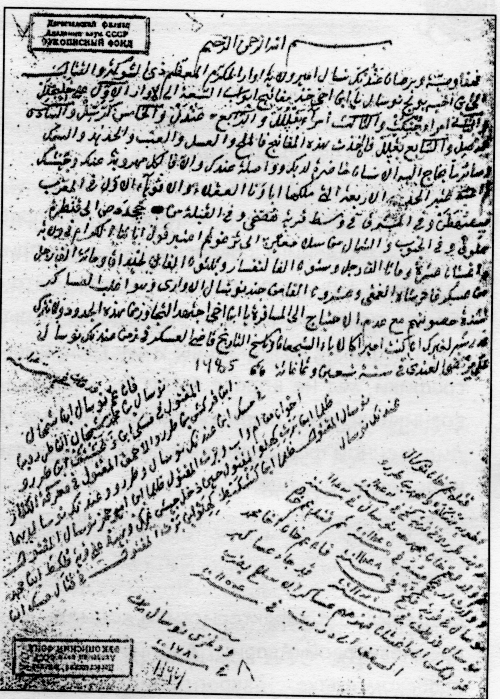
Testament of the ruler of the "vilayet Avar" Andunik in Arabic.

He was the son of the past nutsal Ibrahim I. Throughout his reign, he tried to expand his possessions, but without significant success. He is known for the so-called "testament", which is addressed to his nephew Bulach, at the end of which it says: "O son of my brother! If you want to become an emir like your brave ancestors, then try to cross these boundaries, not yielding even an land". Among other things, the will lists the number of Nutsal's troops and another list mentions another of his nephew Khadzhiali Shamkhal, whom was also given a "testament".

The toponym Dagestan is also mentioned for the first time in this testament of 1485.

== See also ==
- Abuhosro
- Avar Khanate
- Sarir

== Sources ==
- Saidov Daniel. The emergence of writing among the Avars. Languages of Dagestan. Issue. 1. Makhachkala, 1948, pp. 137–138
- Shikhsaidov Amri. “The testament of Andunik-nutsal”. Dagestan Scientific Center. Issue 1. Makhachkala, 1988.
- Krishtopa, A. E.; Криштопа, А. Е. (2007). Dagestan v XIII--nachale XV vv. : ocherk politicheskoĭ istorii. Moskva: Mamont. ISBN 978-5-903011-17-9. OCLC 191049209., page 6.
