= Tlokh =

Tlokh Тлох Кьохъ
- Selo
- Location within Republic of Dagestan Location within Russia
- Coordinates: 42°40′N 46°28′E
- Country: Russia
- Region: Republic of Dagestan
- District: Botlikhsky District
- Time zone: UTC+3:00

Tlokh (Russian: Тлох; Avar: Кьохъ) is a rural locality (a selo) in Botlikhsky District, Republic of Dagestan, Russia. The population was 770 as of 2010. There are 39 streets.

== Geography ==
Tlokh is located on the right bank of the Andiyskoye Koysu River, 24 km east of Botlikh (the district's administrative centre) by road. Kilyatl is the nearest rural locality.
