= Kizhani =

Kizhani Кижани КӀижани
- Selo
- Location within Republic of Dagestan Location within Russia
- Coordinates: 42°44′N 46°21′E
- Country: Russia
- Region: Republic of Dagestan
- District: Botlikhsky District
- Time zone: UTC+3:00

Kizhani (Russian: Кижани; Avar: КӀижани) is a rural locality (a selo) in Botlikhsky District, Republic of Dagestan, Russia. The population was 346 as of 2010. There are 3 streets.

== Geography ==
Kizhani is located 38 km northeast of Botlikh (the district's administrative centre) by road. Zilo is the nearest rural locality.
