= Beledi, Republic of Dagestan =

Beledi Беледи
- Selo
- Location within Republic of Dagestan Location within Russia
- Coordinates: 42°40′N 46°03′E
- Country: Russia
- Region: Republic of Dagestan
- District: Botlikhsky District
- Time zone: UTC+3:00

Beledi (Russian: Беледи) is a rural locality (a selo) in Godoberinsky Selsoviet, Botlikhsky District, Republic of Dagestan, Russia. The population was 93 as of 2010.

== Geography ==
Beledi is located 20 km west of Botlikh (the district's administrative centre) by road. Zabirkhali is the nearest rural locality.
