= Ankho =

Ankho Анхо
- Selo
- Location within Republic of Dagestan Location within Russia
- Coordinates: 42°43′N 46°14′E
- Country: Russia
- Region: Republic of Dagestan
- District: Botlikhsky District
- Time zone: UTC+3:00

Ankho (Russian: Анхо) is a rural locality (a selo) in Chankovsky Selsoviet, Botlikhsky District, Republic of Dagestan, Russia. The population was 35 as of 2010.

== Geography ==
Ankho is located 15 km north of Botlikh (the district's administrative centre) by road, on the Chankovskaya River. Khando is the nearest rural locality.
