= Botlikh language =

Northeast Caucasian language

Botlikh
- Botlix
- буйхалъи мицIцIи bujxałi mic’c’i
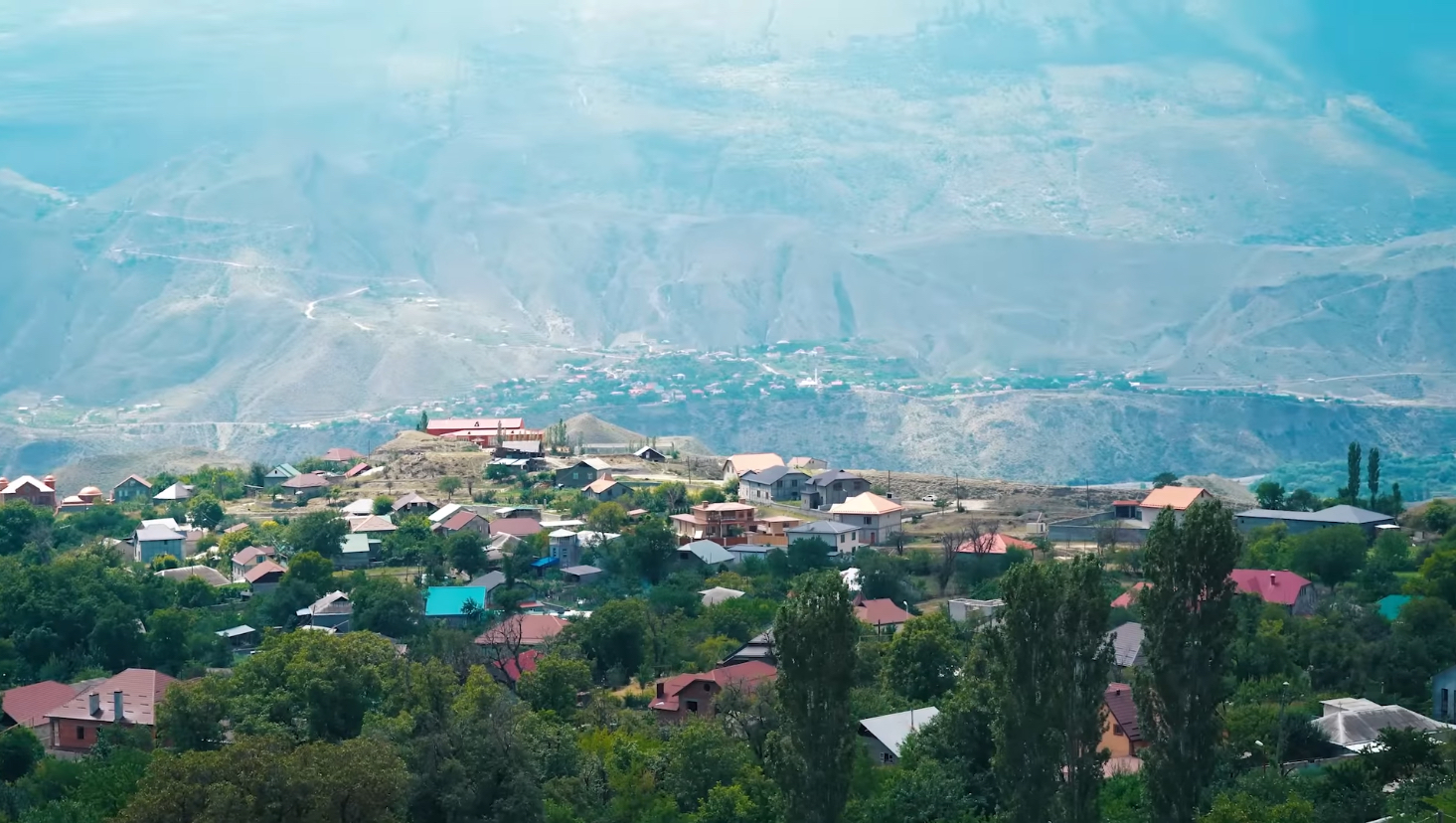
- Botlikh village
- Pronunciation: [bujχaɬi mits’ːi]
- Native to: North Caucasus
- Region: Southwestern Dagestan
- Ethnicity: 3,788 Botlikh people (2020)
- Native speakers: 5,073 (2020 census) c. 8,000 (2012)
- Language family: Northeast Caucasian: Avar–Andic; Andic; Akhvakh–Tindi; Karata–Tindi; Botlikh–Tindi; Botlikh
- Dialects: Botlikh proper; Miarso
- Writing system: unwritten (transcribed using Cyrillic script)

Language codes
- ISO 639-3: bph
- Glottolog: botl1242
- ELP: Botlikh
- Botlikh

- Botlikh is classified as Definitely Endangered by the UNESCO Atlas of the World's Languages in Danger (2010)

Botlikh (also spelled Botlix) is an Andic language of the Northeast Caucasian language family spoken by the Botlikhs in the villages of Botlikh (Buikhe), Miarso and Ashino, as well as in Chontaul, Ankho and in Batlakhatli, in southwestern Dagestan, Russia by approximately 5,000 people, according to the 2020 census.

== Dialects ==
Botlikh has two dialects, being Botlikh proper and Miarso. Differences in phonology and morphology are small, and the two are mutually intelligible.

== Phonology ==
=== Vowels ===
Botlikh has five basic vowels. Vowels can also be long or nasalized.

Botlikh vowels
	Front	Back
Close	i	u
Mid	e	o
Open		a

=== Consonants ===
Botlikh consonants
		Labial	Dental		Alveolar				Palatal		Velar		Uvular		Pharyngeal	Glottal
		Labial	Dental		central		lateral		Palatal		Velar		Uvular		Pharyngeal	Glottal
		Labial	lenis	fortis	lenis	fortis	lenis	fortis	lenis	fortis	lenis	fortis	lenis	fortis	Pharyngeal	Glottal
Nasal		m ⟨м⟩	n ⟨н⟩													
Plosive	voiced	b ⟨б⟩	d ⟨д⟩								ɡ ⟨г⟩					
Plosive	voiceless	p ⟨п⟩	t ⟨т⟩								k ⟨к⟩					
Plosive	ejective		tʼ ⟨тӀ⟩								kʼ ⟨кӀ⟩					ʔ ⟨ъ⟩
Affricate	voiceless		t͡s ⟨ц⟩	t͡sː ⟨цц⟩	t͡ʃ ⟨ч⟩	t͡ʃː ⟨чч⟩		t͡ɬː ⟨лӀ⟩				k͡xː ⟨кк⟩		q͡χː ⟨хъ⟩		
Affricate	ejective		t͡sʼ ⟨цӀ⟩	t͡sʼː ⟨цӀцӀ⟩	t͡ʃʼ ⟨чӀ⟩	t͡ʃʼː ⟨чӀчӀ⟩		t͡ɬʼː ⟨кь⟩				k͡xʼː ⟨кӀкӀ⟩		q͡χʼː ⟨къ⟩		
Affricate	voiced				d͜ʒ ⟨дж⟩											
Fricative	voiceless		s ⟨с⟩	sː ⟨сс⟩	ʃ ⟨ш⟩	ʃː ⟨щ⟩	ɬ ⟨лъ⟩	ɬː ⟨лълъ⟩		çː ⟨хь⟩	x ⟨х⟩	xː ⟨хх⟩	χ ⟨х⟩		ʜ ⟨хӀ⟩	h ⟨гь⟩
Fricative	voiced	v ⟨в⟩	z ⟨з⟩		ʒ ⟨ж⟩						ɣ ⟨гь⟩		ʁ ⟨гъ⟩		ʕ ⟨гӀ⟩	
Approximant					r ⟨р⟩		l ⟨л⟩		j ⟨й⟩							

== Orthography ==
Botlikh is unwritten, and Botlikhs have mostly used Avar as their medium of written communication. When Botlikhs need to write their language, they use the Avar alphabet. The following orthography is used in a Botlikh–Russian dictionary.

А а	Аᴴ аᴴ	Б б	В в	Г г	Гъ гъ	Гь гь	ГӀ гӀ	Д д	Дж дж	(Е е)	Ж ж	З з	И и
Иᴴ иᴴ	Й й	К к	Кк кк	Къ къ	Кь кь	КӀ кӀ	КӀкӀ кӀкӀ	Л л	Лъ лъ	Лълъ лълъ	ЛӀ лӀ	М м	Н н
О о	П п	ПӀ пӀ	Р р	С с	Сс сс	Т т	ТӀ тӀ	У у	Уᴴ уᴴ	Х х	Хх хх	Хъ хъ	Хь хь
ХӀ хӀ	Ц ц	Цц цц	ЦӀ цӀ	ЦӀцӀ цӀцӀ	Ч ч	Чч чч	ЧӀ чӀ	ЧӀчӀ чӀчӀ	Ш ш	Щ щ	Ъ ъ	Э э	Эᴴ эᴴ
