= Muni, Republic of Dagestan =

Muni Муни Муниб
- Selo
- Location within Republic of Dagestan Location within Russia
- Coordinates: 42°40′50″N 46°18′35″E
- Country: Russia
- Region: Republic of Dagestan
- District: Botlikhsky District
- Time zone: UTC+3:00

Muni (Russian: Муни; Avar: Муниб) is a rural locality (a selo) and the administrative centre of Muninsky Selsoviet, Botlikhsky District, Republic of Dagestan, Russia. The population was 3,220 as of 2010. There are 45 streets.

== Geography ==
Muni is located 10 km northeast of Botlikh (the district's administrative centre) by road, on the Unsatlen River. Kvankhidatli is the nearest rural locality.
