= Andi language =

Northeast Caucasian language

Andi
- Qwannab
- къӀаваннаб мицӀцӀи qwavannab miċċi
- Pronunciation: [qχʼavannab mitsʼːi]
- Native to: North Caucasus
- Region: Southern Dagestan
- Ethnicity: 11,800 Andi (2010 census)
- Native speakers: 21,150 (2020 census)
- Language family: Northeast Caucasian: Avar–Andic; Andic; Andi

Language codes
- ISO 639-3: ani
- Glottolog: andi1255
- ELP: Andi
- Andi

- Andi is classified as Definitely Endangered by the UNESCO Atlas of the World's Languages in Danger (2010)
- Coordinates: 42°43′N 46°17′E

Andi is a Northeast Caucasian language belonging to the Avar–Andic branch spoken by about 5,800 ethnic Andi (2010) in the Botlikh region of Dagestan. The language is spoken in the villages Andi (along the river Andi-Koisu), Gunkha, Gagatl, Ashali, Rikvani, Chanko, Zilo, and Kvanxidatl.

== Dialects ==
There are four main dialects, Munin, Rikvani, Kvanxidatl, and Gagatl, which appear quite divergent. However, the dialects can be said to vary between villages: the "upper-group" contains Andi, Gagatl, Rikvani, and Zilo (where Andi and Zilo are considered their own dialects), whereas the "lower-group" contains Munin and Kvanxidatl. The upper-group lacks the affricate sound кьI.

== Phonology ==
Andi has 43 consonants:

		Labial	Dental/ alveolar		Post- alveolar/ palatal		Velar		Uvular		Pharyngeal/ Glottal
		Labial	lenis	fortis	lenis	fortis	lenis	fortis	lenis	fortis	Pharyngeal/ Glottal
Nasal		m	n								
Plosive	voiceless	p	t				k	kː			ʔ
Plosive	voiced	b	d				ɡ				
Plosive	ejective	pʼ	tʼ				kʼ	kʼː			
Affricate	voiceless		tsː		tʃ	tʃː			qχ		
Affricate	voiced				dʒ						
Affricate	ejective		tsʼ	tsʼː	tʃʼ	tʃʼː			qχʼ	qχʼː	
Fricative	voiceless		s	sː	ʃ	ʃː	x		χ	χː	h
Fricative	voiced	v	z		ʒ				ʁ		(ʕ)
Lateral	continuant		ɬ								
Lateral	affricate		tɬː	tɬʼː							
Trill			r								
Approximant			l		j						

There are five vowels: /a, e, i, o, u/.

== Orthography ==
Although Andi is usually unwritten, there are attempts to write the language using Russian Cyrillic script. Speakers generally use Avar or Russian as their literary language(s). There have been some 19th-century texts written in Andi.

The 2015 translation of the Gospel of Luke uses the following alphabet: А а, Б б, В в, Г г, Гъ гъ, Гъгъ гъгъ, Гь гь, Д д, Е е, Ё ё, Ж ж, ЖӀ жӀ, З з, И и, Й й, К к, Кк кк, Къ къ, Кь кь, КӀ кӀ, КӀкӀ кӀкӀ, Л л, Лъ лъ, Лълъ лълъ, М м, Н н, О о, П п, Р р, С с, Сс сс, Т т, ТӀ тӀ, У у, Ф ф, Х х, Хх хх, Хъ хъ, Хь хь, Ц ц, Цц цц, ЦӀ цӀ, ЦӀцӀ цӀцӀ, Ч ч, Чч чч, ЧӀ чӀ, ЧӀчӀ чӀчӀ, Ш ш, Щ щ, ъ, ы, ь, Э э, Ю ю, Я я

A 2018 primer uses the following alphabet:

А а	Б б	В в	Г г	ГӀ гӀ	Гь гь	Гъ гъ	ГъӀ гъӀ	Д д	Е е
Ё ё	Ж ж	Жъ жъ	ЖъӀ жъӀ	З з	И и	Й й	К к	КӀ кӀ	Кь кь
Къ къ	КъӀ къӀ	Л л	ЛӀ лӀ	Ль ль	Лъ лъ	ЛъӀ лъӀ	М м	Н н	О о
П п	ПӀ пӀ	Р р	С с	Т т	ТӀ тӀ	У у	Ф ф	Х х	ХӀ хӀ
Хь хь	Хъ хъ	Ц ц	ЦӀ цӀ	ЦъӀ цъӀ	Ч ч	ЧӀ чӀ	ЧъӀ чъӀ	Ш ш	Щ щ
Ъ ъ	Ь ь	Ӏ	Э э	Ю ю	Я я

== Grammar ==
Andi has 7 different series of localization: the meaning "inside" changes by number (singular -ла/-а, plural -хъи: гьакъу-ла 'in a home', гьакъоба-хъи 'in houses'). Number categories are expressed through ablaut (имуво воцци в-усон 'The father found the brother', but имуво воццул в-осон 'The father found the brothers'). In the village Andi, there is a difference between the speech of men and women; a man will say, for example, дин meaning 'I', мин meaning 'you', гьекIа 'person', but a woman will say ден 'I', мен 'you', гьекIва 'person'.
