= Tsez =

Tsez may refer to:

- Tsez language
- Tsez people
