= Filan (Caucasus) =

Filan (Arabic: فلان) was a people and principality in the early medieval Caucasus. They are known only from Arabic-language sources. According to the 9th-century historian al-Baladhuri, their ruler, the Filan-Shah, had been appointed as an autonomous prince by the Sasanian emperor Khosrow I (r. 531–579). The tribe likely lived in what is now southern Dagestan, but its ethnic identity is uncertain; they may have been of Avar origin. According to the 10th-century geographer al-Mas'udi, the Filan eventually became part of the neighbouring principality of Sarir.

== Sources ==
- Bosworth, C. E. & MacKenzie, D. N. (1978). "al-Ḳabḳ". In van Donzel, E.; Lewis, B.; Pellat, Ch. & Bosworth, C. E. (eds.). The Encyclopaedia of Islam, Second Edition. Volume IV: Iran–Kha. Leiden: E. J. Brill. pp. 341–351. doi:10.1163/1573-3912_islam_COM_0405. OCLC 758278456.
