= Zagidat Magomedbekova =

Soviet/Russian/Georgian linguist

Zagidat Magomedovna Magomedbekova (Russian: Загидат Магомедовна Магомедбекова; 5 January 1920 – 12 September 1999) was a Soviet, Russian and Georgian linguist known for her contribution to East Caucasian linguistics, specializing in the study of Andic languages. She is the author of the first comprehensive grammars of Akhvakh (1967) and Karata (1971), did research on Bagvalal, and wrote the articles on Akhvakh, Karata and Chamalal for the standard compendium Языки народов СССР (The Languages of the Peoples of the Soviet Union).

== Academic career ==
Magomedbekova's native language was Avar, closely related to the Andic languages which were to become the subject of her research. She studied at the State Pedagogical Institute in Makhachkala from 1938 to 1942. She subsequently taught Russian language and literature at middle schools in Botlikh and Vedeno from 1942 to 1946. In 1946, she went on to study linguistics as an aspirant (graduate student) under Arnold Chikobava at Tbilisi State University, defending her candidate's thesis in 1949. In 1970, she submitted her doctoral dissertation on the Karata language.

The linguistic materials for her pioneering and still unsurpassed descriptions of Akhvakh and Karata were collected personally during extensive field trips in the 1940s and 1950s.

From 1950 to 1952 she served as a prorector of the Dagestan State Pedagogical Institute and held the chair for Linguistics of Dagestan at the Institute for Schools of the Dagestan ASSR Ministry of Education. From 1952 until her death in 1999 she held a position as a Senior Research Fellow at the Georgian Academy of Sciences, additionally teaching as a professor at the Tbilisi Theatrical Institute from 1967 to 1982.

== Personal life and honours ==
Magomedbekova was born on 5 January 1920, in Khunzakh, Dagestan. She married eminent Caucasian linguist T'ogo Gudava (1922–1976). She died on 12 September 1999, in Moscow.

On 17 December 1999, the Arnold Chikobava Institute of Linguistics of the Georgian Academy of Sciences held a Public Session dedicated to her memory. In 2012, the Third International Scientific Conference in Makhachkala dedicated the publication of its Caucasian linguistic presentations to her and her husband's memory.

== Publications ==
- "Багвалинский язык (предварительное сообщение)". [In:] Бокарёв, Е.А. (ed.). Вопросы изучения иберийско-кавказских языков. Москва: Наука 1961 ("The Bagvalal Language (provisional description)". In: Bokarev, E.A. (ed.). Problems of Caucasian Linguistics. (In Russian.) Moscow: Nauka 1961.)
- "Ахвахский язык". "Каратинский язык". "Чамалинский язык". [In:] Виноградов, B.B. (ed.). Языки народов СССР, т. IV: Иберийско-кавказские языки. Москва: Наука 1967. ("The Akhvakh Language". "The Karata Language". "The Chamalal Language". In: The Languages of the Peoples of the USSR. Vol. IV: Caucasian Languages. (In Russian.) Moscow: Nauka 1967.)
- Ахвахский язык. Грамматический анализ, тексты, словарь. Тбилиси: Мецниереба 1967 (The Akhvakh Language. Grammatical analysis, texts, glossary. (In Russian.) Tbilisi: Mecniereba 1967.)
- Каратинский язык. Грамматический анализ, тексты, словарь. Тбилиси: Мецниереба 1971 (The Karata Language. Grammatical analysis, texts, glossary. (In Russian.) Tbilisi: Mecniereba 1971.)
