= Ashino =

Ashino Ашино ГӀашино
- Selo
- Location within Republic of Dagestan Location within Russia
- Coordinates: 42°41′N 46°09′E
- Country: Russia
- Region: Republic of Dagestan
- District: Botlikhsky District
- Time zone: UTC+3:00

Ashino (Russian: Ашино; Avar: ГӀашино) is a rural locality (a selo) in Botlikshky Selsoviet, Botlikhsky District, Republic of Dagestan, Russia. The population was 79 as of 2010.

== Geography ==
Ashino is located 15 km northwest of Botlikh (the district's administrative centre) by road, on the right bank of the Ansalta River. Tando is the nearest rural locality.
