= Khunzakh =

Khunzakh Хунзах
- Selo

Other transcription(s)
  - Avar: Хунзахъ
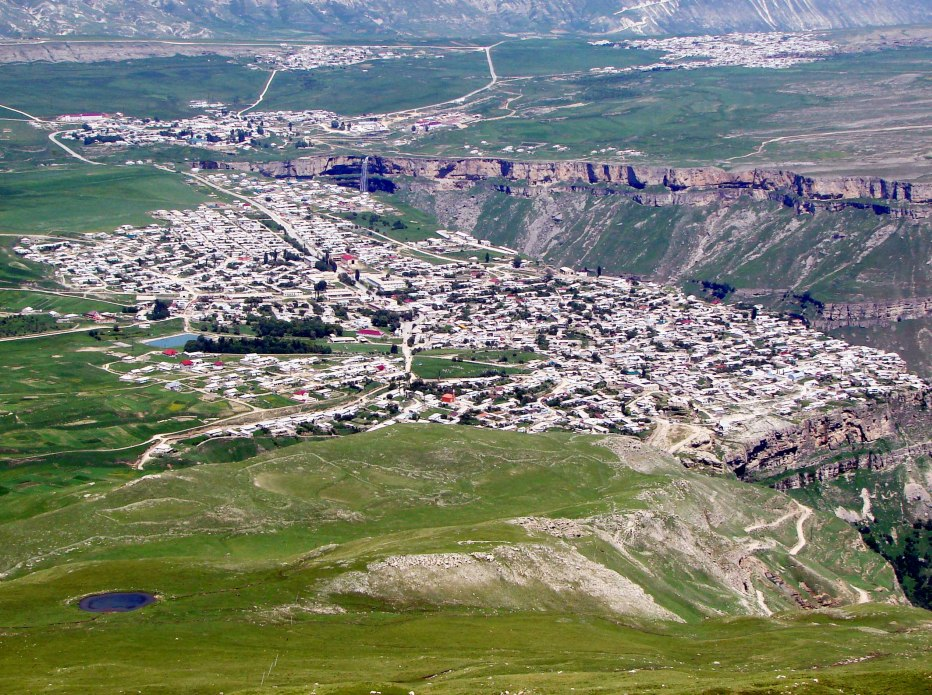
- Aerial view of Khunzakh
- Interactive map of Khunzakh
- Location of Khunzakh Khunzakh (European Russia) Khunzakh (Russia)
- Coordinates: 42°32′44″N 46°42′26″E
- Country: Russia
- Federal subject: Dagestan
- Elevation: 1,670 m (5,480 ft)

Population
  - Estimate (2021): 4,143 )
- Time zone: UTC+3 (MSK)
- Postal code: 368260
- OKTMO ID: 82656490101

Khunzakh (Avar: Хунзахъ, pronounced [ˈχun.zäqχː], Russian: Хунзах) is a rural locality (a selo) and the administrative center of Khunzakhsky District in the Republic of Dagestan, Russia, located in the North Caucasus mountains 1,600 meters (5,200 ft) above sea level. Population: 4,245 (2010 census); 3,694 (2002 census); 2,901 (1989 Soviet census).

== History ==
It is widely accepted among historians that in the period of 5th to 12th century AD, Khunzakh, known as Humraj, was the capital of Sarir, a powerful Christian state in the mountains of the Caucasus.

Khunzakh served as the capital of the Caucasian Avar Khanate from the early 13th century until the Caucasian War which ended with the annexation of the khanate into Russia in 1864. During the Russian Empire, the settlement was the administrative capital of the Avarsky Okrug.

== Culture ==
Khunzakh is considered the cultural heart of the Caucasian Avar region.

== Notable people ==
Heroes of Socialist Labor:

- Khazha Murtuzalievna Lokalova (December 15, 1920-2001), teacher of the Khunzakh secondary school (Dagestan ASSR), Hero of Socialist Labor (1960).
- Magomed Makhulovich Makhulov (February 23, 1915 - April 11, 2021), Soviet statesman, Hero of Socialist Labor (April 8, 1971).

Political and military figures:

- Saratan I (11th century), nutsal (ruler) of the state formation Avar nutsalstvo.
- Surakat I, Avar Nutsal, who ruled according to approximately one account, in the 11th century, according to others, in the 12th century or in the 13th century.
- Bayar II, (12th century) - the son of the Avar nutsal (ruler) and Surakat.
- Andunik I, the ruler (nutsal) of the Avar nutsaldom in the second half of the 15th century.
- Umma Khan IV - (at the end of 1735 or at the beginning of 1736) - the ruler of the Avar Khanate at the beginning of the 18th century
- Muhammad-nutsal IV - (1730 or 1731-1774), ruler of the Avar Khanate from 1735 to 1774.
- Umma Khan of Avar, nicknamed the Great or Mad (1761 or 1762 - March 22, 1801) - Avar Nutsal, ruler of the Avar Khanate from 1774 to 1801.
- Hadji Murad - (1818 - May 5, 1852) - military leader, Naib of Imam Shamil.
- Maksud Alikhanov-Avarskiy (1846-1907), lieutenant general, governor of the Tiflis province.

Others

- Zagidat Magomedbekova (1920–1999), linguist known for her contribution to East Caucasian linguistics
- Shamil Gaziev (1990-), mixed martial artist competing in the UFC

== Panoramic views ==
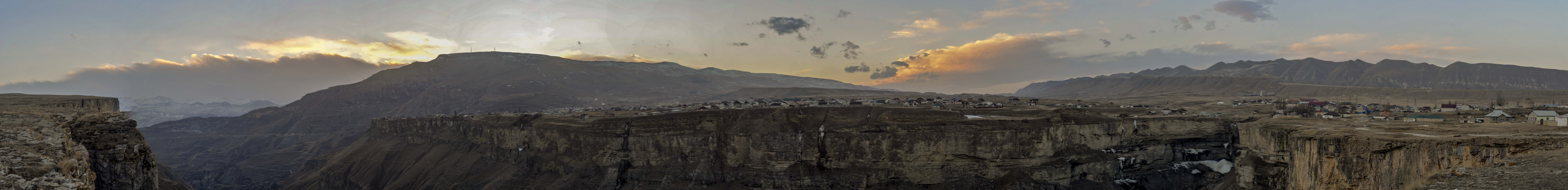
Panorama of the town
