= Tsez people =

Dido
- The flag of the Tsez people

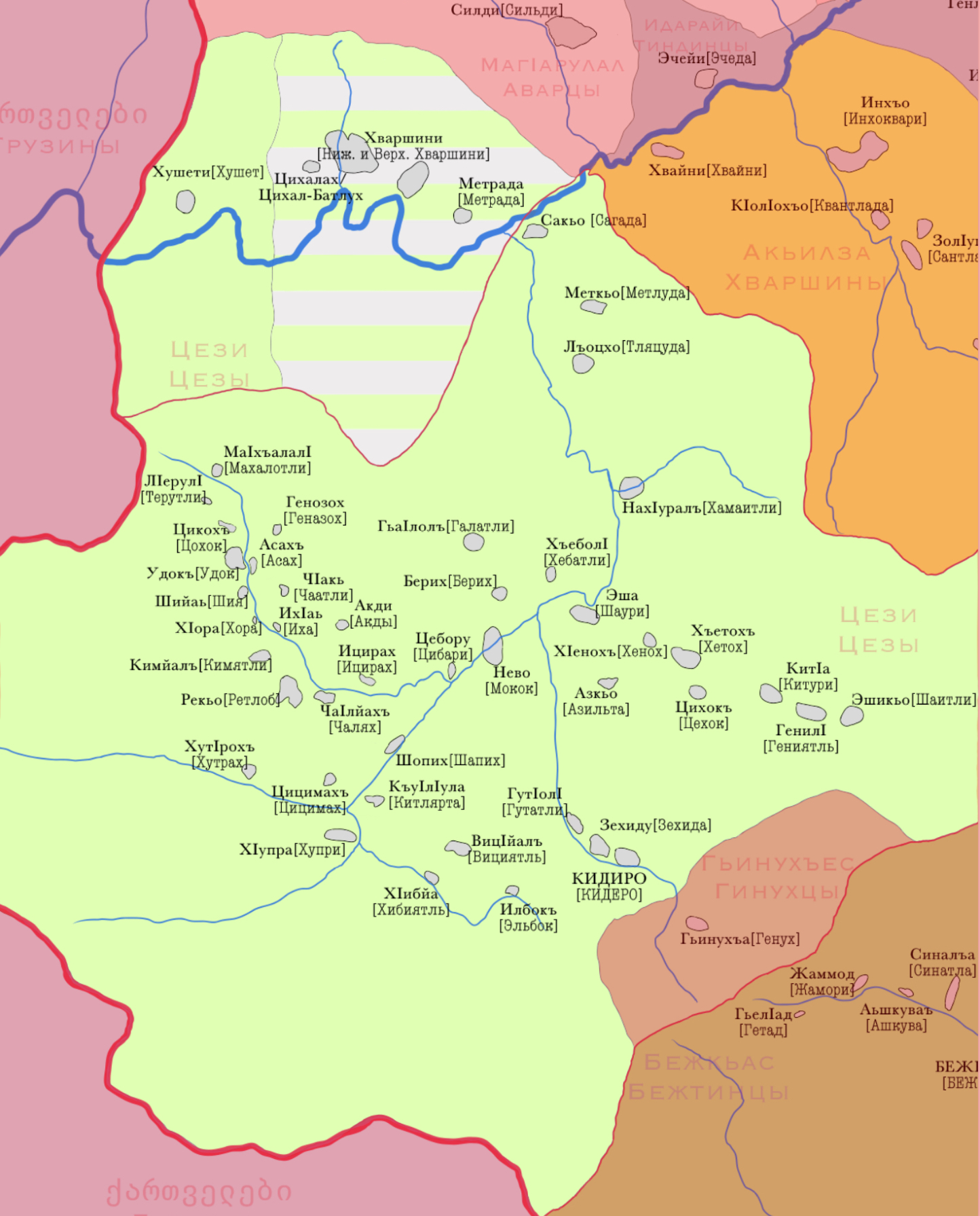

Total population
- c. 30,000 (highest est.)

Regions with significant populations
- Russia: 14,881 (2021 census)

Languages
- Tsez

Religion
- Islam

Related ethnic groups
- Avars and other Northeast Caucasian peoples

The Tsez (also known as the Dido or the Didoi) are a North Caucasian ethnic group. Their unwritten language, also called Tsez or Dido, belongs to the Northeast Caucasian group with some 15,354 speakers. For demographic purposes, today they are classified with the Avars with whom the Tsez share a religion, Sunni Islam, and some cultural traits. They are centered at the Tsunta district of the Republic of Dagestan, Russia. Small communities also live elsewhere in Dagestan and in eastern Georgia. According to the 2002 Russian census, there were 15,256 self-identified Tsez in Russia (15,176 in their homeland).

== History ==
The Tsez inhabit the upper basin of the Andi Koysu in southwestern Dagestan, moslty residing in Tsuntinsky District. Their traditional territory corresponds broadly to the Tsunta, although a substantial part of the Tsez population has migrated to lowland areas of Dagestan.

The territory inhabited by the Tsez was historically situated within the political sphere of the Avar highlands. Most of the territory was ruled by the rulers of Sarir, while Georgian sources indicate connections between parts of the southwestern area and Kakheti before the 11th century. From the 15th century, the Tsez, or Dido, are described as forming an independent political unit that was nominally dependent on the Avar Khanate. They maintained close economic and political relations with neighbouring Andic communities and with the Tush and Bats living in Kakheti.

Map of the Dido (Tsez) unions & societies in the 18th century

Political organisation of the Tsez consisted primarily of rural communities called djamaats. Communal assemblies and councils of elders exercised political and judicial authority, while social issues were resolved by the local adat.

19th-century military banner of the Tsez

Islam gradually became established among the Tsez. The process of Islamization intensified from the 15th century, and by the 17th–18th centuries Islam had become the dominant religion of the Tsez. Elements of earlier religious practices nevertheless survived alongside Islamic beliefs.

The traditional economy was adapted to the mountainous environment. The abundance of pastureland, and conversely the shortage of arable land, meant that seasonal livestock rearing, particularly sheep raising, while cattle and horses were also kept. Agriculture was practiced on terraced fields, but local grain production was insufficient to meet requirements, resulting in exchange with agricultural communities in the lowlands.

During the 19th century, the Tsez free societies were incorporated into the Russian Empire as during the Russian conquest of the Caucasus. Russian administrative influence over the mountain communities increased during the second half of the century, while the incorporation of the region into wider markets contributed to the development of monetary exchange and economic relations with other parts of Dagestan.

The political struggles following the Russian Revolution also affected the Tsez. During the Russian Civil War between 1917 and 1922, the mountain communities became involved in the wider political and armed conflict. Soviet forces established control over Dagestan in 1920 after the supression of the Dagestan uprising, however resistance continued in the mountain regions during the following decade. The subsequent establishment of Soviet authority brought major changes to the political and economic organization of Tsez communities.

During the Soviet rule, Tsez language use went under changes. Historically Avar played an important role as the language of wider communication in Dagestan but during Soviet rule Russian became increasingly important through Soviet education and administration. Tsez remained the language of everyday communication in the Tsunta area, but approximately half of the Tsez population had migrated to lowland Dagestan by the late 20th century, where use of Avar and Russian was more widespread.

== Culture ==
The Tsez traditionally engaged in raising livestock and limited cultivation. In more recent times, some Tsez have migrated to industrial centers for work. The Tsez adhere to Sunni Islam. Islam became the majority faith of the Tsez by the 17th and 18th centuries though elements of pre-Islamic customs are still present.

== Genetics ==
According to genetic studies in 2016, the following haplogroups are found to predominate among Tsez:

- J1 (99%)
- J2 (1%)
