= Anvar Ibragimgadzhiyev =

Russian footballer

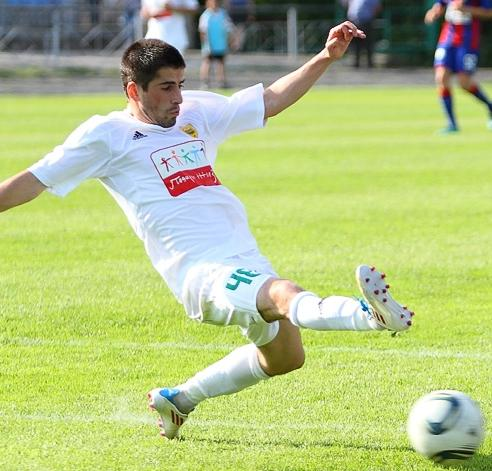

Personal information
- Full name: Anvar Imanaliyevich Ibragimgadzhiyev
- Date of birth: 27 September 1991 (age 35)
- Place of birth: Chanko, Dagestan ASSR, Russian SFSR, Soviet Union
- Height: 1.72 m (5 ft 7 1/2 in)
- Position: Defender

Senior career*
| Years | Team | Apps | (Gls) |
| 2009 | FC Academia Dimitrovgrad | 25 | (1) |
| 2010–2012 | FC Anzhi Makhachkala | 0 | (0) |
| 2012–2013 | FC Khimki | 1 | (0) |
| 2013–2014 | FC Zimbru Chişinău | 27 | (1) |
| 2014 | FC Anzhi Makhachkala | 0 | (0) |
- * Club domestic league appearances and goals

Anvar Imanaliyevich Ibragimgadzhiyev (Russian: Анвар Иманалиевич Ибрагимгаджиев; born 27 September 1991) is a former Russian professional football player.

== Career ==
Anvar Ibragimgadzhiyev made his professional debut for Anzhi Makhachkala on 14 July 2010 in the Russian Cup game against FC Pskov-747 Pskov.

He made his Russian Football National League debut for FC Khimki on 22 August 2012 in a game against FC Ufa.
