= Kusur, Republic of Dagestan =

Kusur Кусур Гьочотӏа
- Selo
- Location within Republic of Dagestan Location within Russia
- Coordinates: 41°46′N 46°56′E
- Country: Russia
- Region: Republic of Dagestan
- District: Rutulsky District
- Time zone: UTC+3:00

Kusur (Russian: Кусур; Avar: Гьочотӏа) is a rural locality (a selo) in Kalyalskoye Rural Settlement, Rutulsky District, Republic of Dagestan, Russia. Population: 612 (2010 census); 642 (2002 census); 449 (1989 Soviet census). There are 2 streets.

== Geography ==
Kusur is located 50 km northwest of Rutul (the district's administrative centre) by road.

== Nationalities ==
Avars live there.
