= Botlikh people =

Ethnic group of Dagestan, Russia

Botlikh
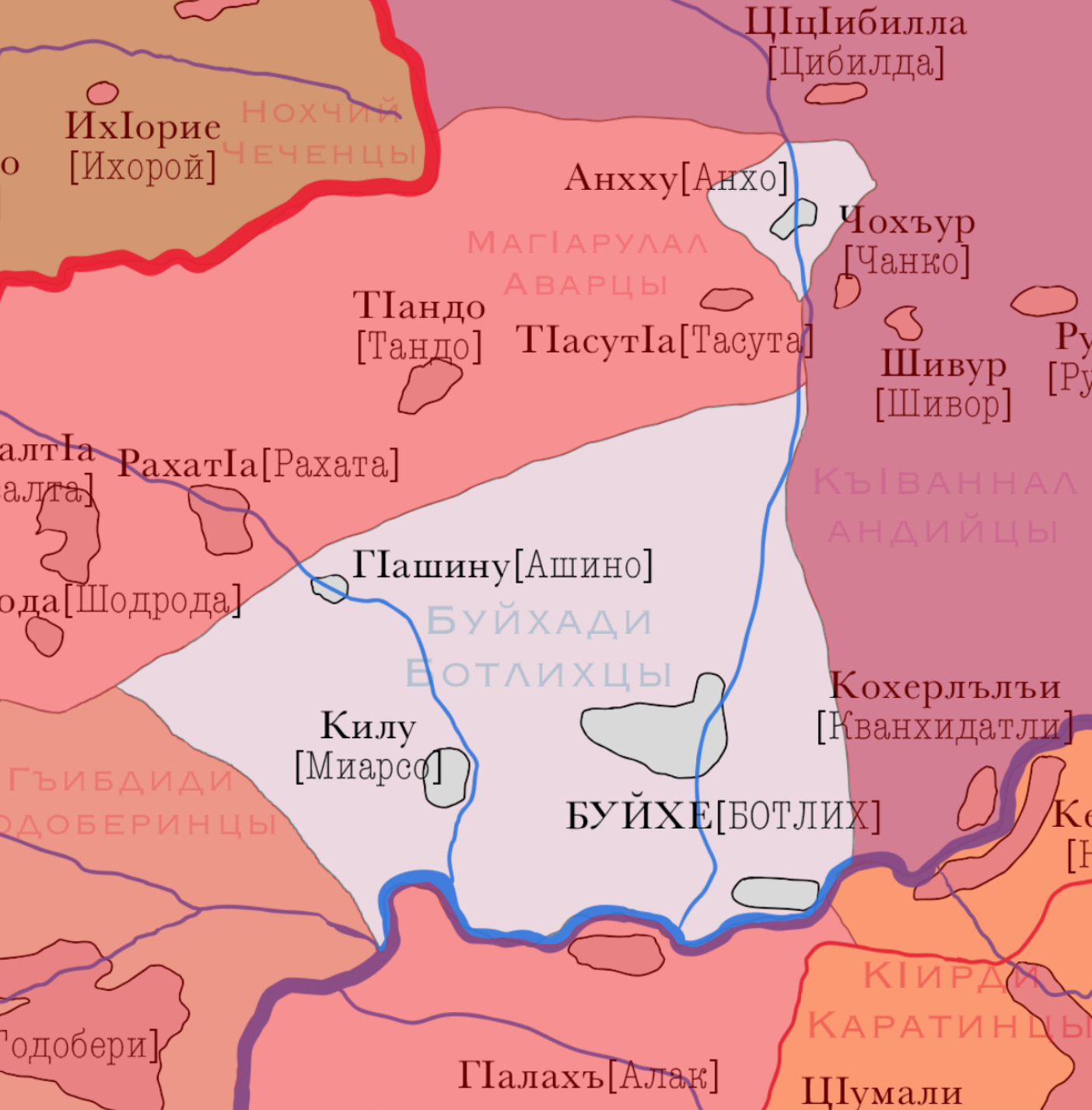

Total population
- 3,788

Regions with significant populations
- Russia: Dagestan 3,503: 3,788 (2021)

Languages
- Botlikh language

Religion
- Islam

Related ethnic groups
- Northeast Caucasian peoples

The Botlikh people (also known as Bótligh, Botlig, Botlog or Buikhatli) are an Andi–Dido people of Dagestan. Until the 1930s they were considered a distinct people. Since that time they have been classified as Caucasian Avars and have faced a campaign to have them assimilate into that population. The Botlikh are primarily Sunni Muslims. They adopted the religion by the 16th century due to the influence of Sufi missionaries.

They numbered 3,354 people in 1926. They speak the Botlikh language, which belongs to the Northeast Caucasian language family. According to the 2021 Russian census, 3,788 people in Russia declared themselves as Botlikhs (all of them in Dagestan), and 5,073 people declared speaking the Botlikh language. The number of speakers is higher, about 5,500, according to a survey by Koryakov in 2006.

The village of Botlikh is just north of the Andi Koysu River. During the Murid War Russian forces gathered here for their final push against Shamil. During the Dagestan uprising the Reds were defeated here several times.

== Sources ==
- Wixman, Ronald. The Peoples of the USSR: An Ethnographic Handbook. (Armonk, New York: M. E. Sharpe, Inc, 1984) p. 31
