= Gelbakh =

Gelbakh Гельбах Гелбахъ
- Selo
- Location within Republic of Dagestan Location within Russia
- Coordinates: 43°09′N 46°51′E
- Country: Russia
- Region: Republic of Dagestan
- District: Kizilyurtovsky District
- Time zone: UTC+3:00

Gelbakh (Russian: Гельбах; Avar: Гелбахъ) is a rural locality (a selo) in Kizilyurtovsky District, Republic of Dagestan, Russia. The population was 1,473 as of 2010. There are 33 streets.

== Geography ==
Gelbakh is located 9 km south of Kizilyurt (the district's administrative centre) by road. Bavtugay and Nizhny Chiryurt are the nearest rural localities.

== Nationalities ==
Avars live there.
