= Datuna Church =

Medieval church in Dagestan, Russia

Coordinates: 42.4704°N 46.62096°E

- Датуна гьатӀан
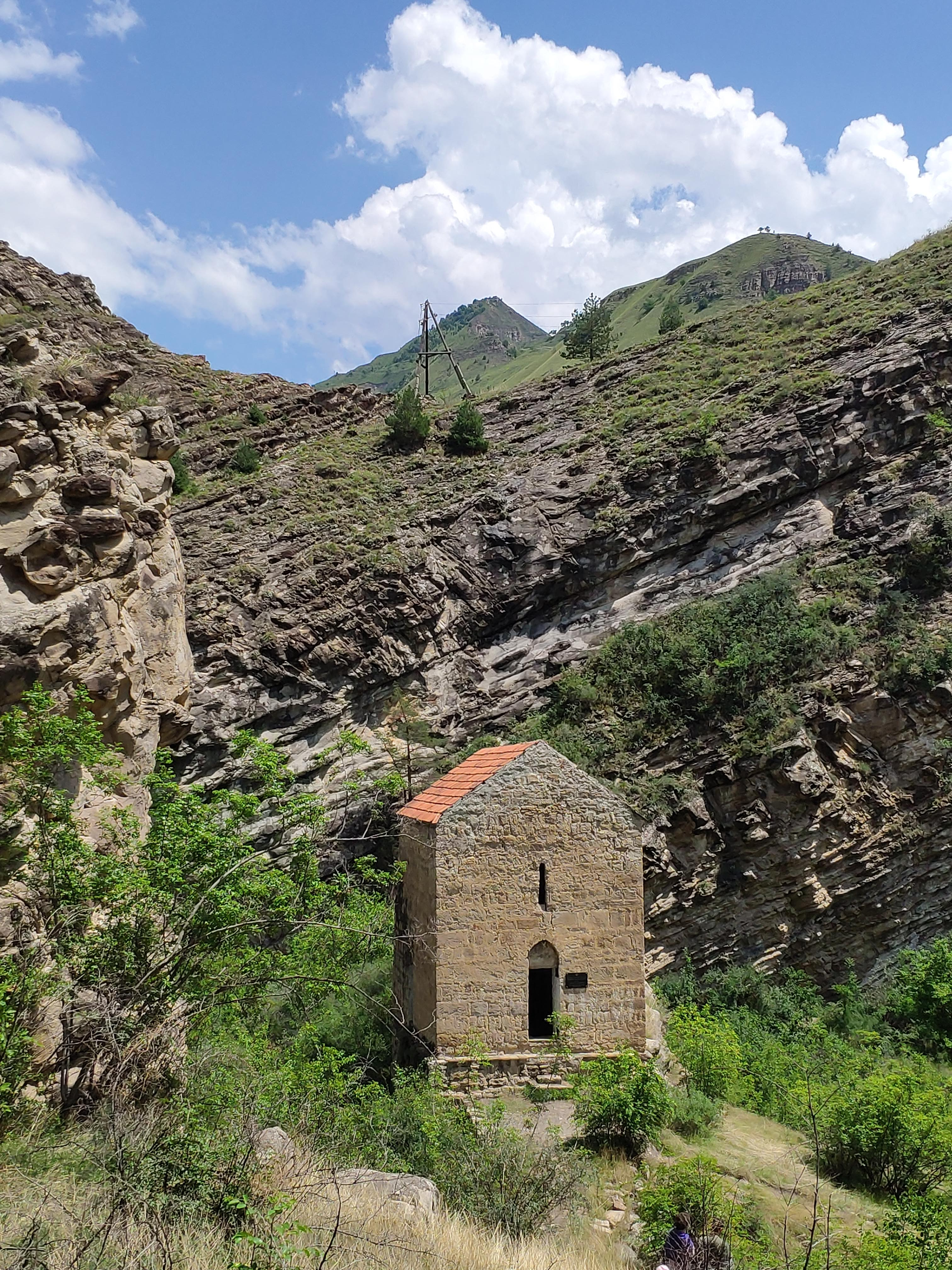

Religion
- Affiliation: Georgian Orthodox Church
- Year consecrated: 10-11th century

Location
- Location: Datuna, Dagestan, Russia
- Interactive map of Datuna Church

Architecture
- Type: Basilica

Datuna Church (Avar: Датуна гьатӀан; Georgian: დათუნას ეკლესია; Russian: Датунский храм) is the only medieval church that survives in modern Dagestan (where most of the population is Muslim). It is situated in the Shamilsky District, in Russia's Dagestan republic, about 4 km south of the village of Datuna (which sits on the bank of the Avarian Koisu, one of the region's major rivers).

The basilica's architecture is similar to that of the Kazreti and Achi monasteries. It is thought to have been built by the Georgian Orthodox missionaries at the turn of the 10th and 11th centuries. It is the only church surviving from the Christian state of Sarir. It is a reminder of the close political and cultural ties between Georgia and Sarir in the Early Middle Ages.

The church is listed in the Russian cultural heritage register as a landmark of nationwide (federal) importance.

== Bibliography ==
- Gajiev, V. G (2013) History of Dagestan, Tbilisi State University, ISBN 9785458344876
