= Datuna (village) =

Datuna Датуна
- Selo
- Location within Republic of Dagestan Location within Russia
- Coordinates: 42°28′N 46°38′E
- Country: Russia
- Region: Republic of Dagestan
- District: Shamilsky District
- Time zone: UTC+3:00

Datuna (Russian: Датуна) is a rural locality (a selo) in Shamilsky District, Republic of Dagestan, Russia. Population: 214 (2021 census); 179 (2002 census); 137 (1989 Soviet census). There are 4 streets in this selo.

== Geography ==
This rural locality is located 8 km from Khebda (the district's administrative centre), 89 km from Makhachkala (capital of Dagestan) and 1,652 km from Moscow. Urib is the nearest rural locality.
