= OKTMO =

Russian register of municipal divisions

Russian Classification of Territories of Municipal Formations (Russian: Общероссийский классификатор территорий муниципальных образований, romanized: Obščerossijskij klassifikator territorij municipal'nyh obrazovanij), or OKTMO (Russian: ОКТМО), is one of several Russian national registers. OKTMO organizes information about the structure of the municipal divisions of Russia.

The document assigns numeric codes to each municipal division of the country.

OKTMO is used for statistical and tax purposes. It was adopted on 14 December 2005 and went into effect on 1 January 2014, replacing OKATO (Russian Classification on Objects of Administrative Division).

== See also ==
- OKATO, Russian Classification on Objects of Administrative Division
