= Muhammad ar-Rafi =

Dagestani historian

Muhammad Rafi (also known as Diya ad-Din Abul-Fath al-Makki or Mullah Rafi) was a medieval Dagestani historian who lived in the second half of the 13th century. The author of the historical chronicle "Tarikhi Dagestan" (“History of Dagestan”) written in 1312–1313. The chronicle was supplemented and received its final form only in the 17th century.

== Tarikhi Dagestan ==
"Tarikhi Dagestan" includes several texts created at different times. The most ancient part of "Tarikh Dagestan" can be considered its beginning – a story about the pagan Avar lands, about the income of Nutsal (ruler) and the former greatness of the rulers of Avar lands, known in Arabic historical and geographical literature of the 9th–10th centuries under the name Sarir.

"Tarikh Dagistan" is also a collection of various historical stories relating to different historical periods, and also contains a number of legendary stories. In the structure of the chronicle, four independent directions of narration can be distinguished: the fate of paganism and the rulers of the Avar region (Avaria), Islamization of the Dagestan population; the struggle of the Dagestanis against the Mongol invaders, feudalism in Dagestan and the shamkhal rulers of the 14th-century.

The original version of this work was also written much earlier before the birth of this author, presumably in 318–930. Vladimir Minorsky suggested dating the work to the 13th-century, with which the Soviet Caucasian specialist L. Lavrov agreed.

Currently, more than 40 lists of Tarikhi Dagestan are known in copies of the 18th – early 20th centuries. All texts are in Arabic and the scribes are Dagestanis by origin. It is noteworthy to mention that list No.38 was used by Abbasgulu Bakikhanov in "Golestan-e Eram". However, he himself notes that in the manuscript of 1030 AH (1620), excerpts from a story written in 712 AH (1312) by Muhammad Rafi and old notes from an essay compiled in 318 AH (930) were used.

Vladimir Minorsky also wrote: “This is a collection of local legends about some descendants of the “Uncles of the Prophet”, who allegedly emigrated to Dagestan from Syria.

== See also ==
- Avar Khanate
- History of Dagestan
