= Andi people =

Indigenous Dagestanian peoples of Russia

Andis
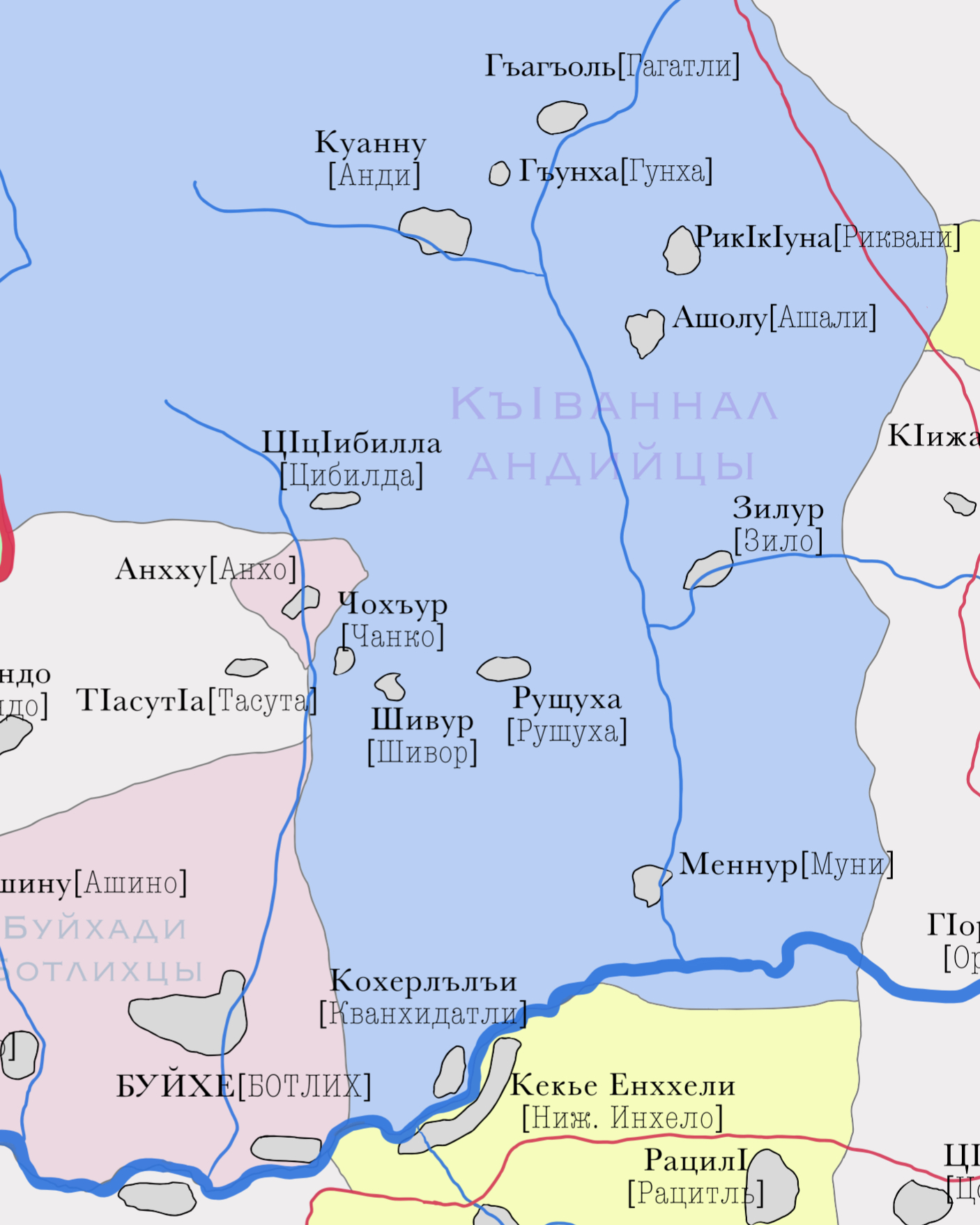

Total population
- c. 40,000 (highest est.)

Regions with significant populations
- Russia: 16,758 (2021 census)

Languages
- Andi language

Religion
- Islam

Related ethnic groups
- Northeast Caucasian peoples

The Andis (къӀваннал in Andi, ГӀандал in Avar) are one of the indigenous Dagestan peoples of North Caucasia. Their territory is included in the Botlikhsky District (raion) of Dagestan. The Andis are Sunni Muslims.

The Andis live in western Dagestan. Their neighbors to the northwest are the Chechens; to the southeast, the small ethnic groups speaking other Andian languages and the Avars. The principal area of settlement, Andia, is a vast valley bordered by the Andi ridge and its spurs. The snow-covered steep ridge forms the entire northern boundary and exercises a moderating influence on Andia's climate by sheltering it from cold winds. In the past, access to Andia could be difficult: the roads linking it to the outside world were guarded on the south by the Mynin Tower and on the north by the fortress of Butsurkha. At present, however, all of the Andian villages are linked by automobile routes. The village of Andi was an important location during the campaign of the Battle of Dargo (1845) and at other times during the Murid War.

== Demography ==
In 1938 the Andis numbered 9,750. By 1990 the population had grown to 10,600. The density of settlement is 39-40 persons per square kilometer. About half of the Andis have emigrated to the Daghestanian lowlands (Khasavyurt, Babayurt, and Kizilyurt districts). Although they were counted as a separate nationality in the 1926 census, the Andis, along with the seven other small communities speaking languages of the Andian Subgroup (see "Linguistic Affiliation"), have been counted as Avars in more recent Soviet censuses. In 2002 the Andis numbered 21,808.

== Linguistic affiliation ==
The Andi language belongs to the Andic subgroup of the Avar–Andic languages, itself a branch of the Northeast Caucasian language family. Linguists have described nine Andi. The speech of women and men are distinguished by certain phonetic, lexical, and stylistic features (noted in the village of Andi).

== See also ==
The term Andi is extended to:

- The village of Andi (42.784°N 46.250°E)
- The Andi language
- The Andi Koysu River south of Andi, which flows east to meet the Avar Koysu and form the Sulak River
- The Andi Gates, which extend east from Andi up to the Salatau Plateau
- The Andi Ridge, which separates the basin of the Andi Koysu basin from that of the Terek River to the north
