= Avar Khanate =

Khanate in the North Caucasus (1200s–1864)

Avar Nutsaldom ГӀатӀидаб Нуцалдом (Avar)
- Early 13th century–1864
- Flag Coat of Arms according to Prince Vakhushti's Atlas (c.1745)

- Avar Khanate under Umma Khan (18th century) Avar Khanate; Vassals and Tributaries
- Capital: Khunzakh
- Common languages: Avar
- Religion: Sunni Islam (official)
- Government: Khanate
- History
  - Established: Early 13th century
  - Disestablished: 1864
| Preceded by | Succeeded by |
| Sarir | Russian Empire |

The Avar Khanate or Avar Nutsaldom (Avar: Avar Nutsallhi; Russian: Аварское ханство), also known as Khundzia, or simply Avaria, was a long-lived Avar state, which controlled mountainous parts of Dagestan (in the North Caucasus) from the early 13th century to the 19th century.

== History of Avar Nutsaldom ==
Between the 5th and 12th centuries, Georgian Orthodox Christianity was introduced to the Avar valleys. The fall of the Christian Kingdom of Sarir in the early 12th century and later weakening of neighboring Georgians by the Mongol invasions, who made their first appearance in the Caucasus with approximately 20,000 warriors led by Subutai and Jebe, terminated further Christian Georgian presence in this area. In fact, numerous traces of Christianity (crosses, chapels) are found within the Avar territory and it is now assumed that Christianity, penetrating from Georgia, survived among the Avars down to the 14th to 15th centuries.

After ravaging Georgia, the Mongols cut across the Caucasus Mountains during the winter to get around the Derbent Pass. Although the Avars had pledged their support to Muhammad II of Khwarezm (reigned 1200-1220) in his struggle against the Mongols, there is no documentation for the Mongol invasion of the Avar lands. As historical clues are so scarce, it is probably fruitless to speculate whether the Avars were the agents of the Mongol influence in the Caucasus and whether they were entrusted with the task of levying tribute for the khan, as modern historian Murad Magomedov suggests.

The Golden Horde overran the region in 1241, but by the 14th century, the newly established Avar Khanate managed to maintain independence from the Mongols. The rise of the Shamkhalate of Kazi-Kumukh following the disintegration of the Golden Horde in the 15th century was at once a symptom and a cause of the Khans' diminished influence during the 15th and 16th centuries. The khanate was a loosely structured state, sometimes forced to seek the Tsar's protection against its powerful enemies, while many mountainous communities (djamaats) obtained a considerable degree of autonomy from the khan.

In the 16th century, the region was the center of a fierce struggle for control by the Ottomans and the Safavids. Under Turkish influence, in the 17th century, the majority of the Avar tribes adopted Islam. The consolidation of Islam in Avaristan in the 18th century resulted in a series of religious wars against the Georgian states, these sporadic forays are also known as Lekianoba in Georgian historiography. The references to these raids appear in the Epic poetry of Avars; the names of rulers who led the most devastating attacks, Umma-Khan, Nursal-Bek, and Mallachi, are mentioned in Georgian sources.

In the 18th century, the steady weakening of the Shamkhals fostered the ambitions of the Avar khans, whose greatest coup was the defeat of the 100,000-strong army of Nader Shah in September 1741 during his conquest of Dagestan. In the wake of this success, Avar sovereigns managed to expand their territory at the expense of free communities in Dagestan and Chechnya. The reign of Umma-Khan (from 1775 to 1801) marked the zenith of the Avar ascendancy in the Caucasus. Potentates who paid tribute to Umma-Khan included the rulers of Shaki, Quba, and Shirvan.

Within two years after Umma-Khan's death, the khanate voluntarily submitted to Russian authority. Yet the Russian administration disappointed and embittered freedom-loving highlanders. The institution of heavy taxation, coupled with the expropriation of estates and the construction of fortresses, electrified the Avar population into rising under the aegis of the Muslim Imamate, led by Ghazi Mohammed (1828–32), Hamzat Bek (1832–34) and Imam Shamil (1834–59). This Caucasian War raged until 1864, when the Avar Khanate was abolished and the Avar District was instituted instead.

Since 1864, the Avar Khanate has been annexed to Russia.

== List of rulers ==
- The first ruler by name - Avar (6th century)
- unknown rulers
- Abuhosro (mid-8th century)
- Khosro (it is not known exactly whether he ruled), the son of the previous
- unknown rulers
- Uruskhan (Aruskhan)
- Khidirshah, son of the previous
- Tarraz, son of the previous
- Abbas, son of the previous
- Safishah, son of the previous
- Khavadshah, son of the previous
- Firavn, son of the previous
- Amir, son of the previous
- Said, son of the previous
- Tahmaz, son of the previous
- Fardin (Perid), son of the previous
- Bayar, son of the previous
- Namrud, son of the previous
- Kad (Bakir), son of the previous
- Firudshah (Prussianshah), son of the previous
- Toku son of Firuja (mid-11th century)
- Ummakhan, son of Firudshah
- Uruskhan (Aulkhan), son of the previous
- Saratan I, son of the previous
- Surakat I (12th century), son of the previous
- Ahmad, usurper (12th century)
- Abu Muslim, usurper (12th century)
- Bayar ((12th century)), son of Surakat
- Masum-bek (12th century)
- Sultan ibn Masum-bek (12th century)
- Chufan ibn Sultan (until 1185)
- Amir-Ahmad ibn Chufan (since 1185)
- Andunik (Amir-Sultan) (12th century), son of Bayar
- Malik Saratan (second half of the 13th century)
- unknown nucals
- Surakat (1362-1396, early 1430s)
- Bayr (early 1430s-?), son of the previous
- unknown nucals
- Shamkhal son of Alibek (possibly Nutsal, but this is not certain) (turn of the 14th–15th centuries)
- Saratan III
- Dugong, son of the previous
- Ibrahim I
- Muhammed-Mirza, son-in-law of the previous one and son of Duguna
- Andunik I (1460—1485), son of Ibrahim I
- Bulach I (1485—1510) nephew of the previous one and son of Muhammad-Mirza
- Amir-Khamza I (1510—before 1523), son of Ummakhan, son of Bulach I
- Shaban (mentioned in 1523/1524), possibly the son of the previous one
- Nutsal Khan I (1540—1546), possibly the son of Amir-Khamza
- Andunik II (1546 - December 1569), the son of the previous one or possibly the son of Shaban
- Ahmad (mentioned in 1547/1548) or Barty I (1569—1570), sons of the previous
- Muhammad-Shvankhal (before 1589), son of Turarava, brother of Andunik II
- Kanbuluk (most likely Ghann-Bulat Avar: Гъан-булат) (неизвестно), son of the previous
- Shvankhal-nutsal I (before 1596), brother of the previous one, or the same person with Kanbuluk
- Muhammad-nutsal I (late 16th century), son of Kushkanti-Khilav, son of Barti I
- Ibrahim II (mentioned in 1600/1601), possibly the son of Shvankhal-nutsal I
- Mahdi I (mentioned in 1610 and ap. 1614), possibly the son of Ibrahim or the son of Muhammed-Shvankhala
- Umma Khan the Just (before 1634/1635), son of Shvankhal-nutsala
- Amir-Khamza II (1634/1635—1646), son of Barti-Khilava, son of Muhammad-nutsal I
- Muldar Mirza I (mentioned in 1650)
- Dugri I (mentioned in 1656 — died in 1667/1668), son of Andunik (Ummakhan), the son of Umma Khan the Just or directly the son of Ummakhan
- Muhammad-nutsal II (1667/1668—1687), son of the previous
- Umma Khan II (1687—1698), son of the previous
- Andunik III, son of the previous
- Dugry II (1698—1706), brother of the previous
- Umma Khan III (1706—1709), son of Dugri II
- Muhammad Nutsal III (1709—1713 or 1725), brother of previous
- Umma Khan IV (1725—1735), son of Elder Bulach, son of Dugri II
- Khankalav (1722—1730), co-ruler, brother of the previous
- Nutsal Khan II (1735—1744), son of Ummakhan III
- Mahmud Khan I (1744 - ?)
- Muhammad-nutsal IV (? - 1774), son of Ummakhan IV
- Umma Khan V (1774 - April 1801), son of the previous
- Gebek Khan I (1801 - January 1802), brother of the previous
- Sultan Ahmed Khan I (1802—1823), son of Ali Sultan of Mehtulin
- Surkhay Khan I (1818—1834), son of Gebek Khan I. Khan was recognized only by the Russian administration. Power was in the hands of Sultan Ahmed Khan I (1802—1823)
- Aslan-Hussein Khan I (1827—1828). Khan was recognized only by the Russian administration. Power was in the hands of Abu Sultan Khan I (1823—1834), son of Sultan Ahmed Khan I
- Abu Sultan Khan I (1823—1834), son of Sultan Ahmed- Khan I
  - Bakhu Bike I (1823—1834), regent, daughter of Umma Khan V
- Sultan Ahmed Khan II (1834—1836), with him regents:
  - Aslan-Hussein Khan I (1834—1836), again
  - Nutsal-Aga I (1836), son of the previous
  - Muhammad Mirza I (1834—1836), brother of the previous
- Ahmad Khan (1836—1843), ruler of the Mehtuli Khanate
- Temporary rulers:
  - foreman Aitber (1843)
  - bek Himmat I (1843)
  - Qadi Muhammad (1843)

In 1837—1859 - as part of the Imamate

- Ibrahim Khan (1859—1864), son of Ahmad Khan of Mekhtulinsky

== See also ==
- List of Sunni Muslim dynasties
- Caucasian Avars
- Gebek Janku ibn Muhammad

== Bibliography ==
- History of Dagestan, vol. 1–4. Moscow, 1967–69.
