= Alexander Kibrik =

Russian linguist and academic

Alexander Kibrik (Russian: Александр Евгеньевич Кибрик; March 26, 1939 – 31 October, 2012) was a Russian linguist, doctor of philology and the head of the department of theoretical and applied linguistics of the Philological Faculty of Moscow State University.

== Life ==
Kibrik was born in Leningrad, the son of the painter Yevgeny Kibrik. He became the head of the department of theoretical and applied linguistics of the Philological Faculty of the Moscow State University in 1992. He worked in the fields of linguistic typology, Northeast Caucasian languages and theoretical linguistics. Kibrik was especially well known for his longtime fieldwork and field teaching, as well as grammar-editing, on the languages of the Caucasus including the Archi, the Khinalug, the Godoberi, the Tsakhur, the Bagvalal, the Russian and Alutor languages.

== Death ==
Kibrik died in Moscow at the age of 73 and was buried at Novodevichy cemetery, near his father. His wife was Russian linguist Antonina Koval. He had two children: the linguist Andrej Kibrik and the painter Nina Kibrik.
