= Avars (Caucasus) =

Northeast Caucasian ethnic group

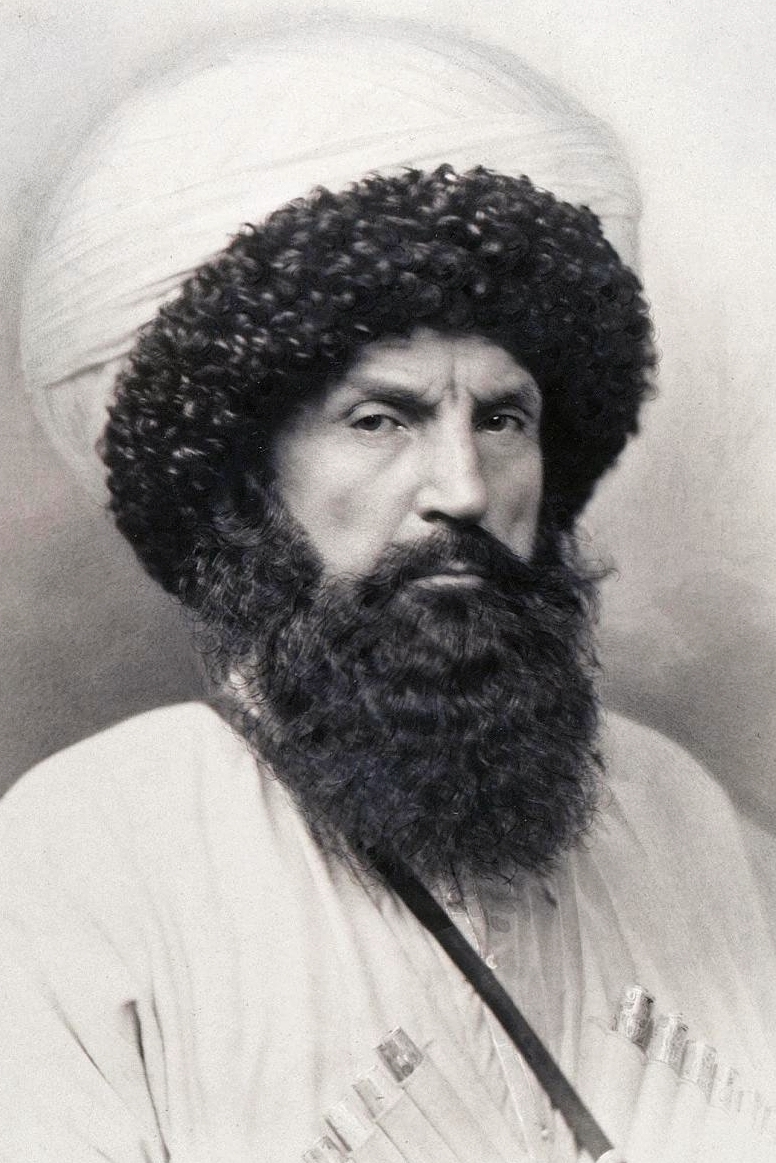
- Imam Shamil, an Avar who was the third Imam of the Caucasian Imamate and led 19th century resistance to Imperial Russia.

Total population
- c. 1.3 million

Regions with significant populations
- Russia: Dagestan: 1,012,074 (2021); 956,831 (2021)
- Azerbaijan: 150,000
- Georgia: 1,060

Languages
- Avar

Religion
- Sunni Islam (99.9%)

Related ethnic groups
- Other Northeast Caucasian peoples (especially Andis, Akhvakhs, Bagvalals, Tindis, Botlikhs, Godoberis, Chamalals, and Karatas)

The Avars (/ˈævɑːrz/), also known as Maharuls' (Avar: магӀарулал, romanized: maⱨarulal, lit. 'mountaineers'), are a Northeast Caucasian ethnic group. The Avars are the largest of several ethnic groups living in the Russian republic of Dagestan. The Avars reside in the North Caucasus between the Black Sea and the Caspian Sea. Alongside other ethnic groups in the North Caucasus region, the Avars live in ancient villages located approximately 2,000 meters above sea level. The Avar language spoken by the Caucasian Avars belongs to the family of Avar–Andic languages. Sunni Islam has been the prevailing religion of the Avars since the 14th century.

== Ethnonyms ==
According to 19th-century Russian historians, the Avars' neighbors usually referred to them with the exonym Tavlins (tavlintsy). Vasily Potto wrote, "The words in different languages have the same meaning... [of] mountain dwellers [or] highlanders." Potto claimed that members of Avarian tribe also often referred to themselves by the alternate endonym maarulal, also meaning "mountaineer".

Most of those known as Tavlins trace their lineage to the upper parts of two tributaries of the Sulak River: the Andiyskoe Koisu and Avarskoye Koisu.

== History ==
Between the 5th and 12th centuries, Georgian Orthodox Christianity was introduced to the Avar valleys. During the Islamic conquests, Arabs invaded the Caucasus, conquering Armenia in 639 and Derbent in 643. They also founded the Emirate of Tbilisi in 736. Later, the Christian kingdom of Sarir governed much of modern-day Dagestan. The Kingdom of Georgia was also Christian. However, when Sarir fell in the early 13th century and Mongol invasions led by Subutai and Jebe weakened Georgia, Christian influence in the area ended. The Avar Khanate, a predominantly Muslim polity, succeeded Sarir. The only extant monument of Sarir architecture is the 10th-century Datuna Church in the village of Datuna. The Mongol invasions seem not to have affected the Avar territory, and the alliance with the Golden Horde enabled the Avar khans to increase their prosperity. In the 15th century, the Horde declined, and the Shamkhalate of Kazi-Kumukh rose to power. The Shamkhalate absorbed the Avar Khanate.

From the 16th century onwards, the Safavids and Ottomans began expanding their territory in the Caucasus. By the mid-16th century, what is now Dagestan, eastern Georgia, Azerbaijan, and Armenia were under Safavid rule. The area that is now western Georgia fell under Ottoman Turkish control. Although the Ottoman Turks briefly gained Dagestan during the Ottoman-Safavid War of 1578–1590, Dagestan and many of its Avar inhabitants stayed under Safavid suzerainty for many centuries. Despite Safavid rule, many ethnic groups in Dagestan, including many Avars, retained relatively high amounts of freedom and self-governance.

After the Russo-Persian War of 1722–1723, Russia briefly took Dagestan from the Safavids. The Afsharids reestablished full control over the Caucasus again in the early 18th century under Nader Shah's Caucasus campaign and Dagestan campaign. During that same time, the Avars routed one of Nader Shah's armies at Andalal during the later stages of his Dagestan campaign. In the wake of this triumph, Umma Khan of the Avars (reigned 1774–1801) managed to extract tribute from most states of the Caucasus, including Shirvan and Georgia.

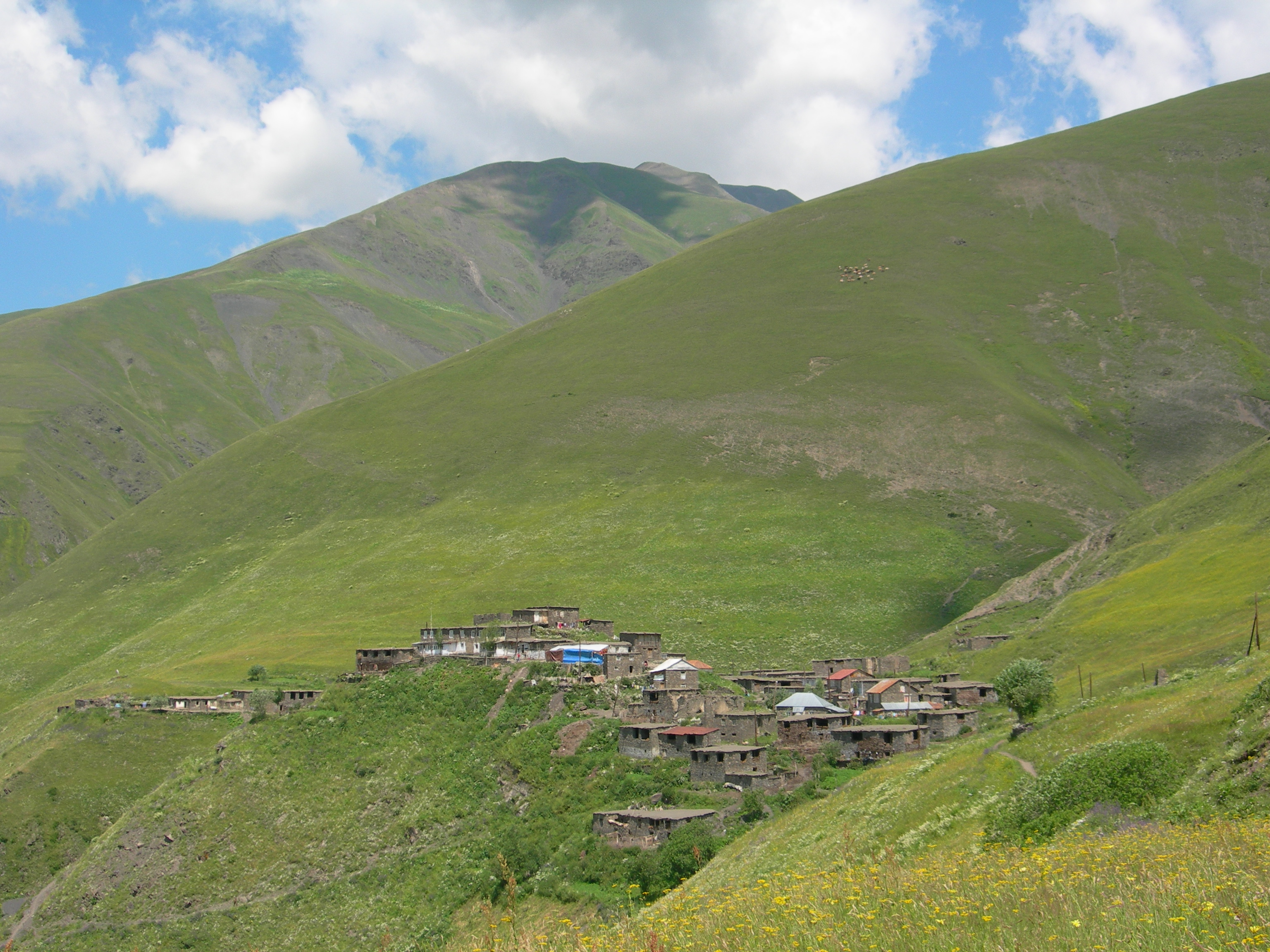
Avar village of Kusur, Dagestan

Umma Khan died in 1801. Two years later, the khanate voluntarily submitted to Russian authority following the Russian annexation of Georgia and the Treaty of Georgievsk. This was only confirmed after considerable Russian successes and the victory in the Russo-Persian War of 1804–1813, after which Persia lost southern Dagestan and many of its other Caucasian territories to Russia. The 1828 Treaty of Turkmenchay indefinitely consolidated Russian control over Dagestan and other areas where the Avars lived.

The Russians instituted heavy taxes, expropriated estates, and constructed fortresses in the Avar region. The Avar population revolted under the flag of the Muslim Imamate of Dagestan. Ghazi Mohammed (1828–1832), Hamzat Bek (1832–1834), and Shamil (1834–1859) led the revolts.

This Caucasian War raged until 1864, when the Avarian Khanate was abolished and replaced by the Avarian District. Some Avars refused to collaborate with Russians and migrated to Turkey, where their descendants live to this day. Despite war and emigration, the Avars retained their position as the dominant ethnic group in Dagestan during the Soviet period. After World War II, many Avars left the barren highlands for the fertile plains closer to the shores of the Caspian Sea.

== Description ==
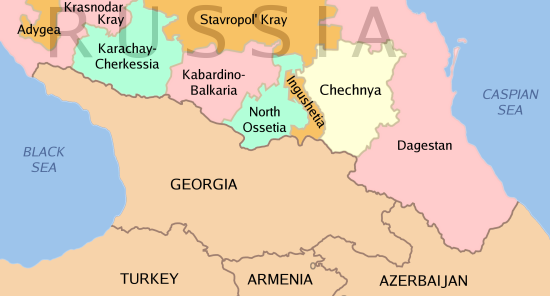
Map of the North Caucasus region

The Avarians are a Northeast Caucasian people who speak Avar, a Northeast Caucasian language. According to Encyclopedia Britannica, the Turanian nomads also share the name Avar. The Encyclopedia Britannica describes the Turanian nomads as "a people of undetermined origin and language."

As of 2002, the Avarians numbered about 1.04 million. 912,020 Avarians lived in Russia during the 2010 census; 850,011 of them lived in Dagestan. Only 32% lived in cities. Avarians inhabit most of the mountainous part of Dagestan as well the plains (Buynaksk, Khasavyurt, Kizilyurt and other regions). Outside of Dagestan, Russian Avars also live in Chechnya and Kalmykia.

As of 1999, 50,900 Avarians lived in the Balakan and Zakatala rayons of Azerbaijan. The Avarian population of Azerbaijan had decreased to 49,800 by 2009. In 2002, 1,996 Kvareli Avars lived in Georgia.

Symbol of the Avarian Khanate

In Turkey, Avarians are considered "ethnic Turks", and so aren't counted as their own ethnic group on the census. This makes it difficult to know exactly how many Avarians live in Turkey. According to Ataev B.M., who referenced A.M. Magomeddadaev's research, the Avarian population there should have been around 53,000 in 2005.

== Ethnic groups ==
Main areas of Northeast Caucasian languages

Avarian is a collective term; among the Avarians there are around 15 sub-ethnic groups, including the Avar, Andi, and Tsez (Dido) peoples.

== Genetics ==
According to genetic studies in 2023, the following paternal haplogroups are found to predominate among Avars:

- J1 (60%)
- R1b (15%)
- G2 (12%)
- J2 (6%)
- L (2%)

== Avarians as highlanders and armed people ==
МагIарулал, transliterated as Ma'arulal means "inhabitants of the top grounds, mountaineers." Another group of Avarians is described as belonging to a different category, Хьиндалал (X'indalal with a soft "χ"). This term means "inhabitants of plains (warm valleys) and gardeners".

The name "Avarians" has a narrower meaning; it has a national meaning connected with former statehood. "Avar" is a significant part of the word "Avaria," which refers to the Khunzakh Khanate. The Khanate formed in the 12th century after the disintegration of Sarir. From the middle of the 19th century, this territory was the Avarian District of the Daghestan area. This area is now referred to as Khunzakhsky District of Dagestan. Khunzakhsky District is referred to as χunzaχ in literary Avarian and χwnzaa in a local dialect.

The modern literary language of Avarias (Awar mac'), both in the past and today, is known among Avarians as the language of boʔ (bolmac'). The Avarian word bo means "army, armed people." According to reconstructions, this word descends from *ʔωar in the proto-Avarian language ("ʔ" represents a glottal stop).

== Names for the Avars ==
In modern Avarian, three words retain the ancient basis of awar. They include awarag, meaning "envoy, prophet, messiah"; awari, meaning "pommel of a saddle"; and awara, meaning "obstacle, opposition". Awara habize means "to make an obstacle, to resist." There is also an Avarian river called авар ʕωr in Avarian and Avar koysu in Russian.

All three listed words are found in ancient lexicons of the Iranian languages. The Parthian word apar and the Middle Persian word abar/aβar both mean "up, on, over" and "higher, superior." The Middle Persian word abraz means "acclivity," or uphill slope. Similar Middle Persian words include abarag/aβarag, meaning "superior"; abargar/aβargar, meaning "god, divinity"; abarmanig/aβarmanig, meaning "noble"; apar amatan, meaning "to surpass", and apar kardan/apar handaχtan, meaning "to attack".

At the same time, according to the morphology of the Middle Persian language, the word Aβarag, meaning "superior" can also be translated as "Aβarian", "Khurasanian", and "Parthian" as seen, for example, in a Middle Persian word, Eranag, meaning "Iranian".

The first known use of the term "Avar" was in the 10th century. According to Persian author Ibn Rustah, a so-called governor of Sarir, Johannes de Galonifontibus was the first person to write about Avars under the name "Avar." He wrote in 1404 that "Circassians, Leks, Yasses, Alans, Avars, [and] Kazikumukhs" live in the Caucasus. According to Vladimir Minorsky, one account from 1424 called the Daghestanian Avars the Auhar.

Azerbaijani writer Abbasgulu Bakikhanov wrote that the "inhabitants of vicinities of Agran have been moved here from Khurasan. A residence of this emir also was Agran". The editor of this book, an academician of the Academy of Sciences of Azerbaijan, Z.M. Buniyatov, confirms that this "Agran" corresponds to the Avar Khanate.

The word "Agran" is unknown to modern Avars. According to the Altiranisches Wörterbuch, written by Christian Bartholomae, "agra" means erste, oberste; Anfang, Spitze in his language, German. This corresponds to "first, upper, beginning, tip" in English. He also wrote that "agra'va" meant vom Obersten, von der Oberseite stammend in German, which translates to "from the top, coming from the upper side."

Nöldeke, Hübschmann, Frye, Christensen and Enoki identify Aparshahr/Abarshahr/Abharshahr/Abrashahr with Khurasan, a historical region of Iran, or with Nishapur, an Iranian city. The Khurasan (xwarasan) in Iranian studies is known as "rise of Sun." The Parthian word apar (Middle Persian abar/aβar, meaning "up, on, over") and Parthian/Middle Persian šahr are cognate with Old Iranian χšaθra, which means "empire, power, the sovereign house.") In summary, Aparšahr/Aβaršahr is very similar to the German word Oberland. According to historian H.W. Haussig, Aβaršahr means Reich der Abar ("Kingdom of the Abar") and should be sought in the south-western territory of the Western Turkic Khaganate.

A Dahae tribe, the Aparnak (Parni) moved from the south-eastern shore of the Caspian Sea (part of modern Turkmenistan), into the territory of Khurasan, where they founded a confederation of Dahae tribes that Avestani texts referred to as "barbarians" and "enemies of Aryans," according to Christian Bartholomae.

On the border of Khurasan, the Sassanid Persians built a strong wall, named the "Great Wall of Gorgan" or "The Red Snake." The wall was built to protect Iran from invasion by the White Huns (Hepthalites; called Khionites, X'iiaona and Xyôn in Zoroastrian texts). Later another wave of White Huns conquered Khurasan and occupied it for a long time. According to Richard Helli: "By such reasoning, the Ephthalites are thought to have originated at Hsi-mo-ta-lo (southwest of Badakhshan and near the Hindu Kush), which tantalizingly, stands for Himtala, 'snow plain', which may be the Sanskritized form of Hephthal." In 484, the Hephthalite chief Akhshunwar led his army to attack the Sassanian King Peroz I, who was defeated and killed in Khurasan. After the victory, the Hephthalite empire extended to Merv and Herat. Some of the White Huns drew up a peace treaty with Iran and the two became allies, both fighting against the Byzantine Empire. Thus, Hephthalites lived in the Khurasan/Khorasan area. According to the Chinese classic Liang chih-kung-t'u, 滑 (pinyin: hua) was the name the Hephthalites used for themselves, and that is probably a Chinese transfer of a similar-sounding word, war/Uar.

Mehmed Tezcan writes that according to a Chinese record, the Hephthalites descended from a Rouran tribe called Hua in the Qeshi region (near Turpan). This tribe came to Tokharistan and soon settled also in eastern regions of Khorasan at the beginning of the 5th century. About the same time, the name Avars/Awards appears in the sources. Again, in his well-known Atlas of China, A. Herrmann shows the eastern regions of Khorasan, Tokharistan, etc. as the dominions of Afu/Hua/Awards/Hephthalites between ca. 440 and 500 A.D., relying on the identification Hua = Uar = Awar.

The German researcher Karl Heinrich Menges considered Eurasian Avars to be one of the ancient Mongol peoples, who "were the first to use the title ga gan (later qān, ḵān) for their supreme ruler." He describes the "traces of a Mongol residue in Daghestan". Supporters of the so-called old Turanian nomad horde "infiltrate" point of view (with various clauses) include the following scientists: Josef Markwart, Omeljan Pritsak, Vladimir Minorsky, Vladimir Baileys, Harald Haarmann, Murad Gadjievich Magomedov, Alikber Alikberov, and Timur Aytberov.

== Language ==
Painting of Avar women having a party by Halil Beg Mussayassul, 1935

The Avar language belongs to the Avar–Andic subgroup of the Northeast Caucasian language family. The writing is based on the Cyrillic script, which replaced the Arabic script used before 1927 and the Latin script used between 1927 and 1938. More than 60% of the Avars living in Dagestan speak Russian as their second language.

== Notable Avars ==
- Imam Shamil, resistance leader during the Caucasian War
- Ghazi Muhammad, Islamic scholar
- Hamzat Bek, imam
- Rasul Gamzatov, poet
- Hadji Murad, military leader during the Caucasian War, waged by of the peoples of Dagestan and Chechnya from 1811 to 1864 against the Russian Empire. He was also a rival to Imam Shamil.
- Magomet Gadzhiyev, World War II submarine commander and hero of the Soviet Union
- Kadi Abakarov, a Red Army sergeant who fought during World War II. Abakarov was awarded the title Hero of the Soviet Union for his actions in the Battle of the Seelow Heights.
- Ali Aliyev, a freestyle wrestler who won five world titles and was the first wrestler from Dagestan to win a world title in freestyle wrestling.
- Murad Gaidarov, freestyle wrestler representing Belarus.
- Magomedkhan Gamzatkhanov, martial artist
- Mustafa Dağıstanlı, Turkish freestyle wrestler of Avar descent
- Sultan Ibragimov, retired boxer who was a former WBO heavyweight champion
- Mansur Isaev, judoka from Russia. He won gold in the finals at the 2012 Summer Olympics in the class 73 kg.
- Tagir Khaybulaev, judoka from Russia. He won gold in the finals at the 2012 Summer Olympics in the class 100 kg.
- Karimula Barkalaev, former MMA fighter who is the only Russian national to have won at the ADCC Submission Fighting World Championship
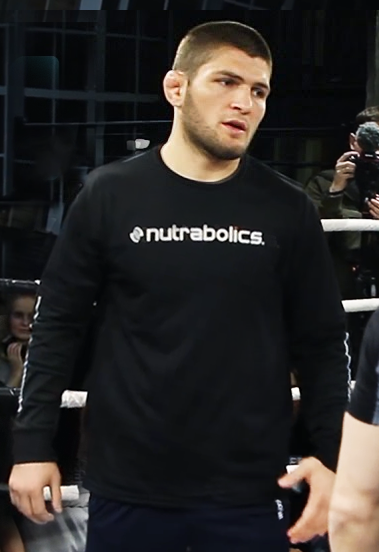
  UFC Lightweight champion Khabib Nurmagomedov
- Khabib Nurmagomedov, mixed martial artist, two-time Combat Sambo World Champion, and an undefeated former UFC lightweight champion
- Abdulmanap Nurmagomedov, Soviet military veteran, former judoka and combat sports coach, father and coach of former UFC Undisputed Lightweight Champion Khabib Nurmagomedov, coach of current UFC Welterweight champion and former UFC Lightweight Champion Islam Makhachev
- Ramazan Emeev, mixed martial artist currently competing in the welterweight division of the Ultimate Fighting Championship. He is a former M-1 Global middleweight champion.
- Zagalav Abdulbekov, first Avar Olympic gold medalist in freestyle wrestling
- Abdulrashid Sadulaev, wrestler who won a gold medal in freestyle wrestling for Russia during the 2016 Summer Olympics in Rio de Janeiro. He also won a gold medal at the 2020 Summer Olympics in the 97 kg category.
- Mavlet Batirov, two-time Olympic gold medalist in freestyle wrestling
- Khadzimurad Magomedov, Olympic gold medalist in freestyle wrestling
- Sagid Murtazaliev, Olympic gold medalist in freestyle wrestling
- Makhach Murtazaliev, Olympic bronze medalist and two-time world champion in freestyle wrestling
- Alisa Ganieva, author who writes in Russian but identifies herself as an Avar
- Gadzhimurat Kamalov, investigative journalist who reported on corruption in the Dagestan area
- Ali Shabanau, freestyle wrestler representing Belarus
- Magomed Tolboyev, Soviet-era test pilot for the Buran space shuttle, also a Hero of Russia
- Abdullah Daghestani, spiritual guide of Shaykh Nazim; buried on Mount Qasioun, Damascus
- Magomed Ankalaev, professional mixed martial artist, former UFC Light heavyweight (MMA) champion.
- Shamil Abdurakhimov, professional mixed martial artist, former UFC fighter
- Magomed Magomedkerimov, professional mixed martial artist, currently competes in the Welterweight division of Professional Fighters League (PFL).
- Usman Nurmagomedov, professional mixed martial artist, current Bellator MMA Lightweight (MMA) champion.

== Media files ==
Avarian archeologist Dr. Murad Magomedov speaks in Russian about ancient migration of Iranians, Turks and Proto-Mongols to the Caspian-Dagestan area.

Famous in Dagestan and the Dagestani diaspora in Turkey, the Avarian poet Adallo Ali (also known as Adallo Aliev) speaks about the Avar language and Avar poetry and literature. Part 1.

Adallo Ali speaks about the Avar language and Avar poetry and literature. Part 2.

== See also ==
- Pannonian Avars
- Vainakh
- Circassians
