= Sarir =

Christian Dagestan state, 5th-12th century

- ca 500?–12th century
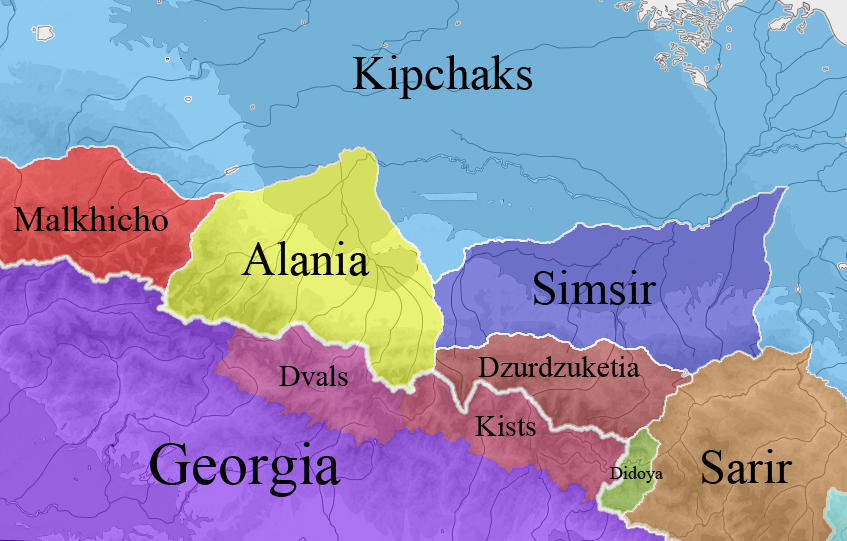
- Status: Christian state
- Capital: Humraj
- Common languages: Avar, other Northeast Caucasian languages
- Religion: Orthodox Christianity
- Government: Kingdom
- History
  - Established: ca 500?
  - Disestablished: 12th century
Succeeded by
Avar Khanate

Sarir or Serir was a medieval Christian state lasting from the 6th or 7th century to the 12th century in the mountainous regions of modern-day Dagestan in southern Russia. Its name is derived from the Arabic word for "throne" and refers to a golden throne that was viewed as a symbol of royal authority.

== Origin ==
Sarir was first documented as a political entity in the 6th century AD. The memory of its foundation was transmitted orally among the Caucasian Avars. According to one legend, the kingdom was established by a Persian general who was sent to control the Caucasus by a Sasanian king. This legend is corroborated by the names of local kings, which are normally of Persian or even Syrian etymology.

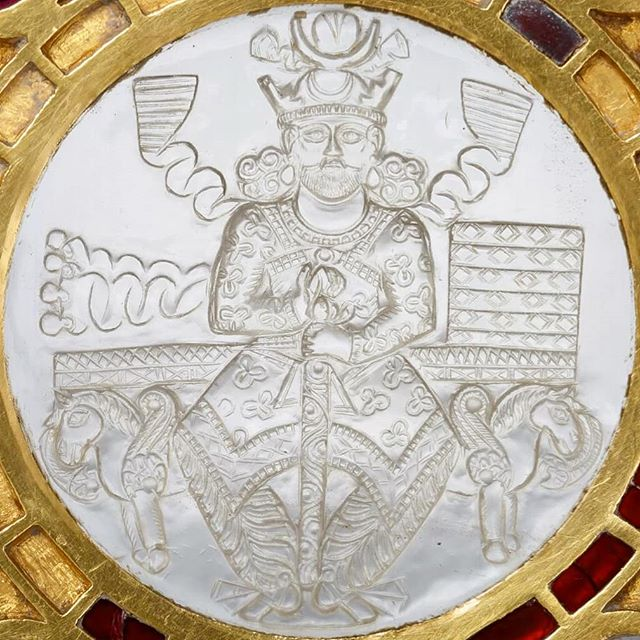
Plate depicting Sasanian shah Khosrow I sitting on his throne. Medieval Arab sources commonly associated Sarir with a throne gifted by Khosrow I or Yazdegerd III.

According to the 10th-century Arab geographer al-Masudi the king of Sarir was a descendant of the 5th-century Sasanian king Bahram V. The first king allegedly arrived in Dagestan as an emissary of Yazdegerd III, bringing with him the Sasanian throne and the imperial treasure after the Sasanian empire had been defeated by the Arabs in the 7th century. To protect the throne he established a hereditary reign. The 9th-century geographer al-Ya'qubi noted that the golden throne of Sarir was a gift of the 6th-century shah Khosrow I Anushirvan. The king of Sarir reportedly titled himself as sahib al-sarir ("master of the throne") as well as khaqan al-jabal ("khagan of the mountain") and wahrazan-shah (possibly "king of the Avars"), titles he had allegedly received from the Sasanian shah. These reports suggest that the kings of Sarir tried to back their authority by claiming a relationship with the Sasanians. During the Iranian Renaissance of the 10th and 11th centuries it was common among both Muslim and Christian rulers of the Iranian world and its periphery to express their legitimacy in reference to the Sasanians.

Sarir bordered the Khazars to the north, the Durdzuks to the west and northwest, the Georgians and Derbent to the south. As the state was Christian, Arab historians erroneously viewed it as a dependency of the Byzantine Empire. The capital of Sarir was the city of Humraj, tentatively identified with the modern-day village Khunzakh. The king resided in a remote fortress at the top of a mountain.

== History ==
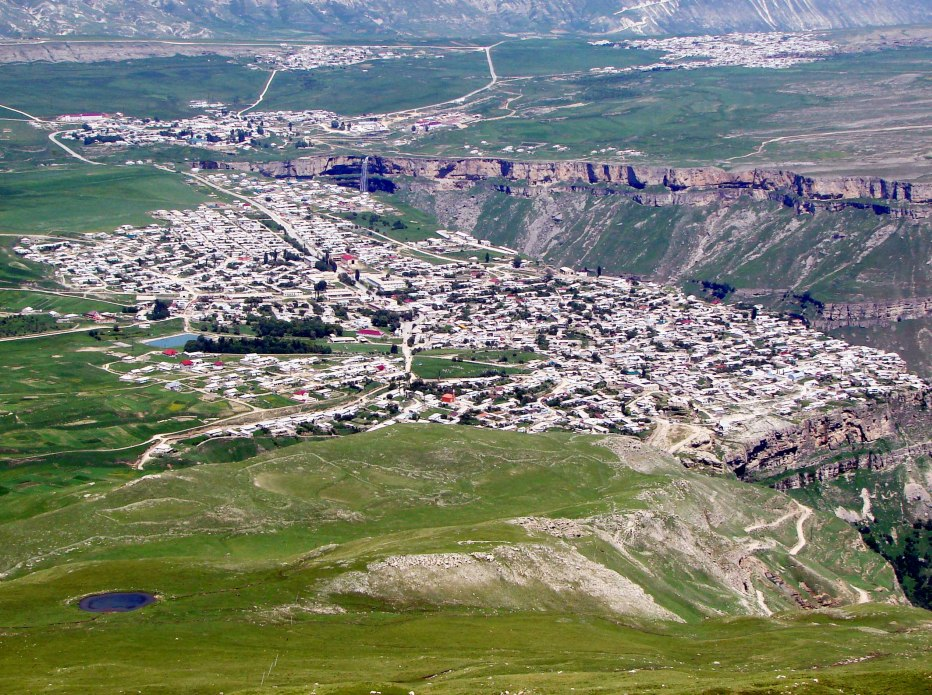
The Khunzakh plateau, which constituted the heart of Sarir

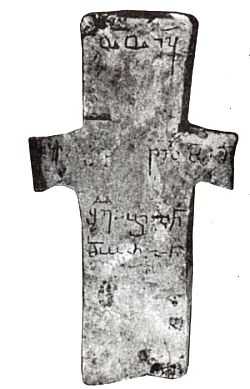
Medieval stone cross with Georgian-Avarian inscription, Hotsatl, Khunzakhsky District.

During the Arab–Khazar wars of the 7th and 8th centuries, the kings of Sarir allied themselves with the Khazars. Following the victorious campaign of Merwan ibn Muhammad in 737–739, Sarir was pressed into submitting to the Caliph's authority. It paid tribute and provided men for the Arab garrison of Derbent until the ninth century, when, emboldened by the shift in momentum in the south, Sarir asserted sovereignty over large portions of the Caucasus, including Gumik, Filan and parts of Arran.

As the hegemony of the Caliphate crumbled, Sarir found itself continually at war with its successor states, such as Derbent and Shirvan. In these wars, it was generally victorious and this allowed Sarir to manipulate the politics of Derbent. Concomitantly, the kings of Sarir shifted away from the Khazar alliance and mounted several incursions into the Khazarian steppes. The pattern of intermarriage between the royal houses of Sarir and Alania cemented the anti-Khazar alliance of the two Christian states.

During the early years of the 11th century ruled a certain Bukht Yisho Khosrow. He is known from a silver plate found in a monastery in southwestern Georgia dated to the year 1008 as well as the 11th-century tarikh al-bab. The latter mentioned that his daughter married Emir Mansur of Derbent in 1025.

== Disintegration ==
Alarmed by the growing Christian supremacy in the Caucasus, the Muslim powers of the region pledged mutual assistance against Sarir. Their economic and military pressure, coupled with internal discord, led to the state's disintegration in the early 12th century. In the 13th century, the Caucasian Avars formed a new Muslim state, traditionally known as Avaristan.

== Religion ==
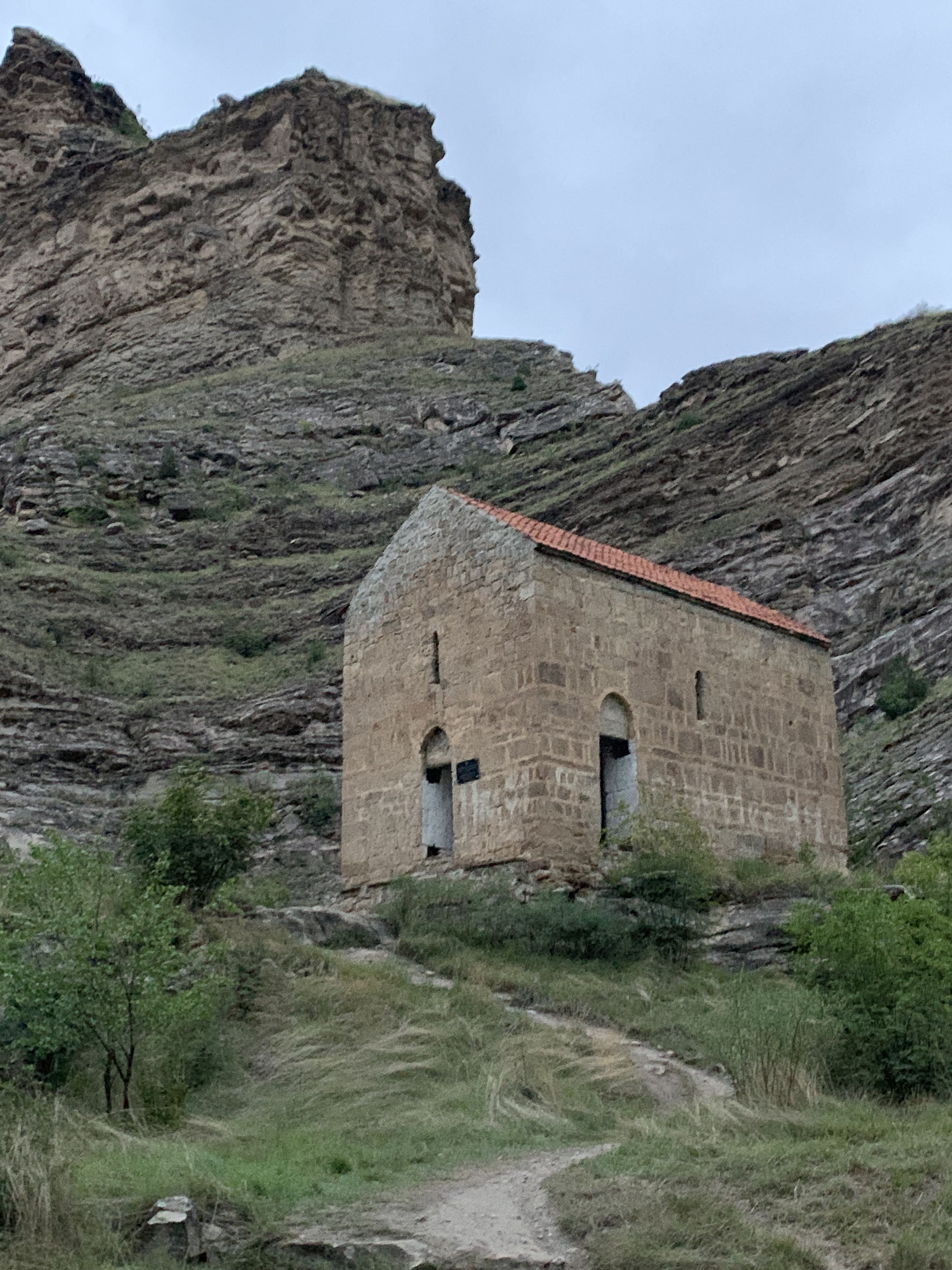
The Datuna Church dating from c. 1000, the only standing medieval church in Dagestan.

The ruler of Sarir and the inhabitants of his fortress were reported to be Christians, while the population of the countryside remained pagans. Relics of Christianity, like crosses, churches and Christian burials, are, however, commonly found throughout much of Avaria. The most significant preserved Christian monument is the Datuna Church, which has been dated to the late 10th–early 11th century. Several stone crosses bearing Georgian, Armenian and even Avarian inscriptions have also been noted. Christianity probably arrived via Georgia and had its peak in Avaria contemporary to the Georgian Golden Age in the 10th–12th centuries. Christianity remained dominant until the early 14th century, but eventually disappeared in favour of Islam. Oral traditions recall that the Datuna church was looted by Muslims in around 1475.

== Rulers ==
- Abuhosro - (c. mid 8th century)
- Khosro - (c. late 8th century)
- Bukht Yisho I – (c. 903)
- Bukht Yisho II – (c. 1025)
- Takhu – (c. 1065)

== Literature ==
- Ataev D.M. Mountainous Dagestan during early Middle Ages (materials of archaeological excavations in Avaria). Makhachkala, 1963 (Атаев Д.М. Нагорный Дагестан в раннем средневековье (по материалам археологических раскопок Аварии). Махачкала, 1963, In Russian).
- Casari, Mario (2023). "The Alexander Legend in Persian Literature". Persian Narrative Poetry in the Classical Era, 800-1500. Romantic and Didactic Genres. Blomsburry. pp. 378–542.
- Chenciner, Robert; Magomedkhanov, Magomedkhan (2023). Dagestan - History, Culture, Identity. Routledge.
- Gasanov, Magomed (2001). "On Christianity in Dagestan". Iran & the Caucasus. 5: 79–84. doi:10.1163/157338401X00080. JSTOR 4030847.
- Khapizov, Sh.M. (2023). "K voprosu o datirovke Datunskogo khrama". Istoriya, Arkheologiya I Etnografiya Kavkaza (in Russian). 19, 3: 610–622.
- Minorsky, Vladimir (1958). A History of Sharvan and Darband in the 10th-11th Centuries. W. Heffer & Sons Ltd.
- Tahnaeva P.I. Christian culture of Medieval Avaria (7th-16th cc.) in context of reconstruction of the political history. Makhachkala, 2004 (Тахнаева П.И. Христианская культура средневековой Аварии (VII–XVI вв.) в контексте реконструкции политической истории. Махачкала, 2004, In Russian)
- Vacca, Alison (2017). Non-Muslim Provinces Under Early Islam. Islamic Rule and Iranian Legitimacy in Armenia and Caucasian Albania. Cambridge University.
- van Donzel, Emeri; Schmidt, Andrea (2009). Gog and Magog in Early Eastern Christian and Islamic Sources. Sallam's Quest for Alexander's Wall. Brill.
