= Municipalities of Russia =

Municipal divisions of Russia as of 1 January 2020
Municipal division	Number
Municipal districts	1,673
Municipal okrugs	33
Urban okrugs	635
Intra-urban municipalities, including: Intra-urban territories of a federal city Urban okrugs with inner-city divisions Intra-urban divisions	286; 267; 3; 19
Rural settlements	16,821
Urban settlements	1,398
Total	20,846

The municipal divisions in Russia, also called municipal formations, (Note: Russian: муниципальные образования, romanized: municipaljnyje obrazovanija, IPA: [mʊnʲɪtsɨˈpalʲnɨje ɐbrəzɐˈvanʲɪjə]) are territorial divisions of the Russian Federation which are formally granted the authority to manage local affairs through local self-government. As of 1 January 2020, there are 20,846 municipal divisions in Russia, including 1,673 municipal districts, 635 urban okrugs, and 33 municipal okrugs.

According to the law, the units of municipal division (called municipal formations) are as follows:

- Municipal district (or municipal raion), is a group of urban and rural settlements, often along with the inter-settlement territories. In practice, municipal districts are usually formed within the boundaries of existing administrative districts. Municipal districts share responsibility for municipal services with the lower-level local governments of the urban and rural settlements included within them.
  - Urban settlement, a city/town or an urban-type settlement, possibly together with adjacent rural and/or urban localities
  - Rural settlement (Russia), one or several rural localities
- Urban okrug (or urban circuit), is an urban settlement not incorporated into a municipal district or municipal okrug, and which has a population density threshold requirement. In practice, urban okrugs are usually formed within the boundaries of existing cities of federal subject significance.
- Intra-urban territory (intra-urban municipal formation) of a federal city, part of a federal city's territory. This municipal unit exists in three cities:
  - Moscow, see Administrative divisions of Moscow
  - Saint Petersburg, see Administrative divisions of Saint Petersburg
  - Sevastopol, see Administrative and municipal divisions of Sevastopol
- Urban okrug with intra-urban divisions, an urban okrug that incorporates intra-urban districts as intra-urban municipalities
  - Intra-urban district (or raion), intra-urban municipalities within the territory of urban okrugs with intra-urban divisions. Intra-urban districts formally exercise local self-government either through direct means or through electoral and other institutions.
- Municipal okrug (or municipal circuit), a grouping of several settlements that were not existing urban or rural settlements municipalities on May 1, 2019. Municipal okrugs are a single tier of local government and formally exercise local self-government either through direct means or through electoral and other institutions.

== Reforms ==
In the course of the Russian municipal reform of 2004–2005, all federal subjects of Russia streamlined the structures of local self-government, which is guaranteed by the Constitution of Russia. The reform mandated that each federal subject have a unified structure of municipal government bodies by January 1, 2005, and a law enforcing the reform provisions went into effect on January 1, 2006. Since 2005, for statistical and tax purposes, all municipal formations are assigned codes according to the Russian Classification of Territories of Municipal Formations, abbreviated in Russian as ОКТМО.

Federal legislation introduced on May 27, 2014, added the territorial units of urban okrug with intra-urban divisions and their constituent divisions (Intra-urban district).

Additional federal legislation introduced on May 1, 2019, added the territorial unit of municipal okrug. The purpose of the creation of municipal okrugs was to transition the two-tier system of the municipal districts to a single-tier system of the municipal okrugs, thereby reducing the number of local governments and thus reducing the cost of local government on the state. This legislation also set standards for the incorporation of new urban okrugs and the change in status of existing ones. In urban okrugs, at least two-thirds of the population must live in the urban settlement(s) within, and the population density must be five times the national average. Existing urban okrugs which do not meet the requirements must be reincorporated as municipal okrgus by 2025. The change was implemented out of concern that some small towns had been incorporated as urban okrugs and given all of the taxing powers and municipal service standards of much larger cities, which in the words of State Duma deputy Viktor Kidyaev turn "villagers into townspeople."

== See also ==
- Elections in Russia#Local self-government elections
