= Botlikhsky District =

Botlikhsky District Ботлихский район (Russian)
- District

Other transcription(s)
  - Avar: Болъихъ мухъ
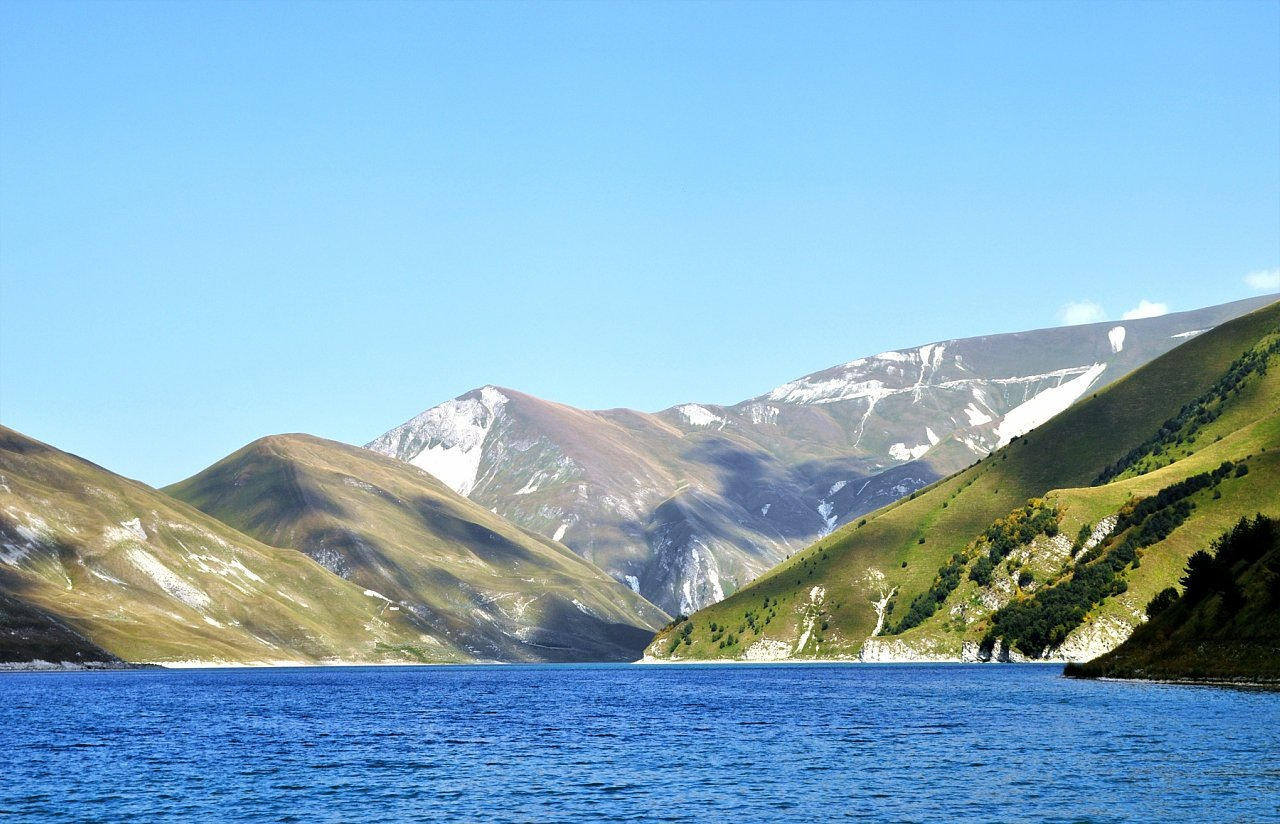
- Lake Kezenoyam, the deepest lake in the Caucasus Mountains, is located mostly in Botlikhsky District

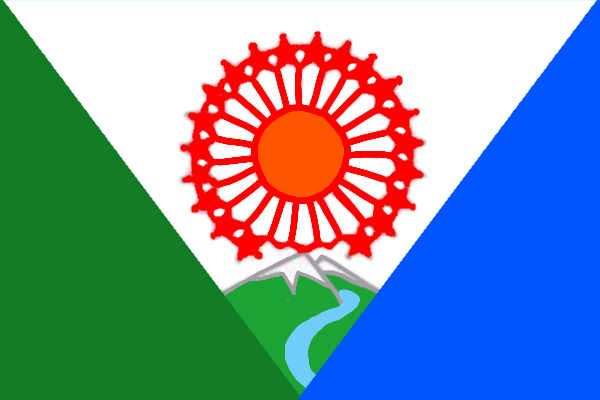
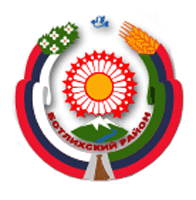
- Flag Coat of arms
- Anthem: My Botlikh (unofficial)
- Location of Botlikhsky District in the Republic of Dagestan
- Coordinates: 42°39′N 46°13′E
- Country: Russia
- Federal subject: Republic of Dagestan
- Established: 1926
- Administrative center: Botlikh

Area
  - Total: 500 km^{2} (190 sq mi)

Population (2010 Census)
  - Total: 54,322
  - Density: 110/km^{2} (280/sq mi)
  - Urban: 0%
  - Rural: 100%

Administrative structure
  - Administrative divisions: 9 Selsoviets
  - Inhabited localities: 37 rural localities

Municipal structure
  - Municipally incorporated as: Botlikhsky Municipal District
  - Municipal divisions: 0 urban settlements, 20 rural settlements
- Time zone: UTC+3 (MSK)
- OKTMO ID: 82609000
- Website: http://xn--80abvlool0a.xn--p1ai/

Population of Botlikhsky District
- 2010 Census: 54,322
- 2002 Census: 50,469
- 1989 Census: 27,161
- 1979 Census: 24,741

Botlikhsky District (Russian: Ботлихский райо́н) is an administrative and municipal district (raion), one of the forty-one in the Republic of Dagestan, Russia. It is located in the west of the republic. The area of the district is 500 square kilometers (190 sq mi). Its administrative center is the rural locality (a selo) of Botlikh. As of the 2010 Census, the total population of the district was 54,322, with the population of Botlikh accounting for 22.4% of that number.

== Administrative and municipal status ==
Within the framework of administrative divisions, Botlikhsky District is one of the forty-one in the Republic of Dagestan. The district is divided into nine selsoviets which comprise thirty-seven rural localities. As a municipal division, the district is incorporated as Botlikhsky Municipal District. Its nine selsoviets are incorporated as twenty rural settlements within the municipal district. The selo of Botlikh serves as the administrative center of both the administrative and municipal district.
