= Botlikh (rural locality) =

Rural locality in Dagestan, Russia

Coordinates: 42°40′02″N 46°12′54″E

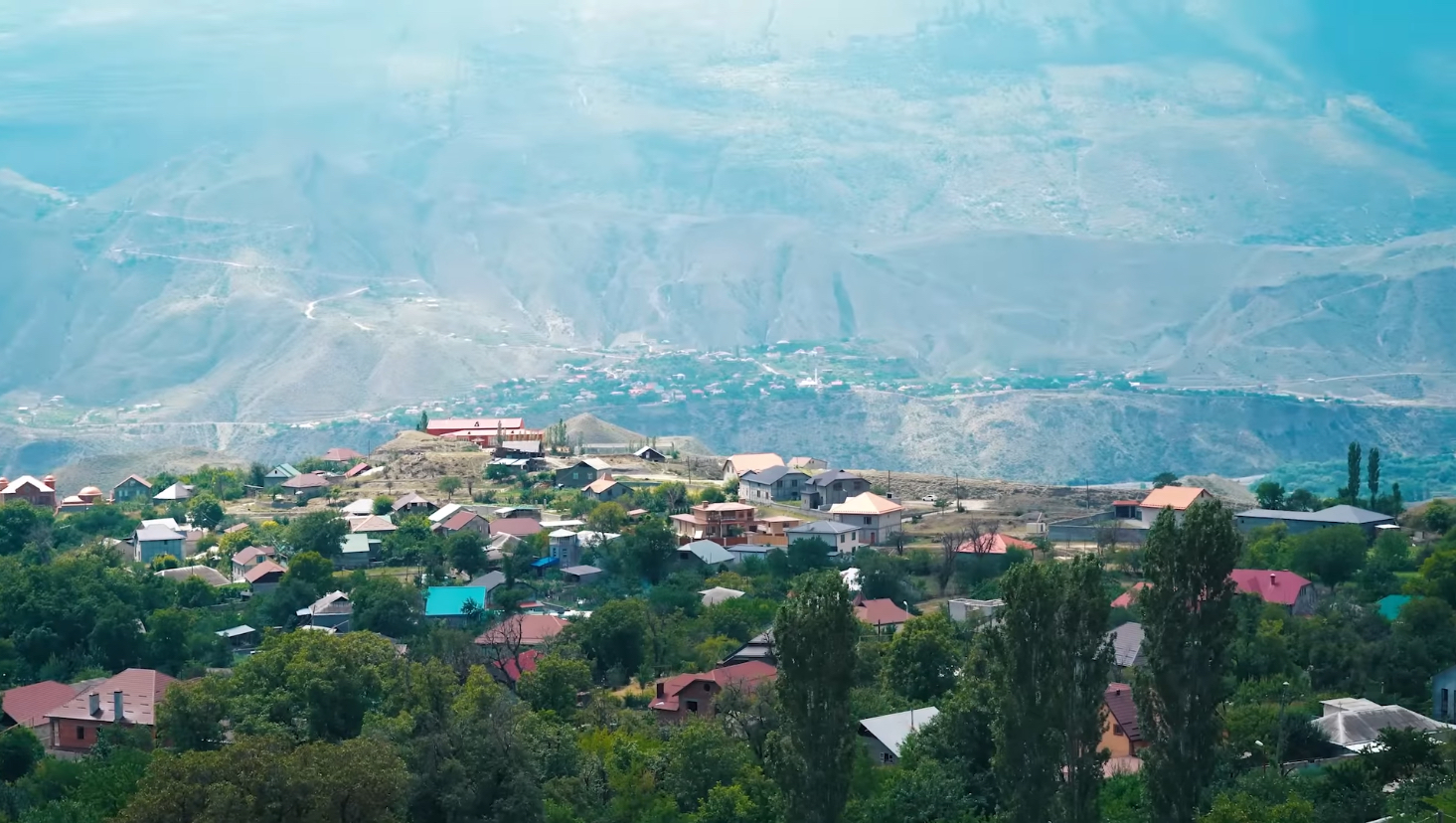
Village of Botlikh

Botlikh (Russian: Ботлих, Botlikh: Болъихъ) is a rural locality (a selo) and the administrative center of Botlikhsky District of the Republic of Dagestan, Russia. Population: 12,159 (2010 census); 10,397 (2002 census); 5,739 (1989 Soviet census). During the Russian Empire, the settlement was the administrative capital of the Andiysky Okrug.

== Sources ==
- Народное Собрание Республики Дагестан. Закон №16 от 10 апреля 2002 г. «Об административно-территориальном устройстве Республики Дагестан», в ред. Закона №106 от 30 декабря 2013 г. «О внесении изменений в некоторые законодательные акты Республики Дагестан». Вступил в силу со дня официального опубликования. Опубликован: "Дагестанская правда", №81, 12 апреля 2002 г. (People's Assembly of the Republic of Dagestan. Law #16 of April 10, 2002 On the Administrative-Territorial Structure of the Republic of Dagestan, as amended by the Law #106 of December 30, 2013 On Amending Various Legislative Acts of the Republic of Dagestan. Effective as of the day of the official publication.).
- Народное Собрание Республики Дагестан. Закон №6 от 13 января 2005 г. «О статусе и границах муниципальных образований Республики Дагестан», в ред. Закона №43 от 30 апреля 2015 г. «О статусе городского округа с внутригородским делением "Город Махачкала", статусе и границах внутригородских районов в составе городского округа с внутригородским делением "Город Махачкала" и о внесении изменений в отдельные законодательные акты Республики Дагестан». Вступил в силу со дня официального опубликования. Опубликован: "Дагестанская правда", №8, 15 февраля 2005 г. (People's Assembly of the Republic of Dagestan. Law #6 of January 13, 2005 On the Status and Borders of the Municipal Formations of the Republic of Dagestan, as amended by the Law #43 of April 30, 2015 On the Status of the "City of Makhachkala" Urban Okrug with Intra-Urban Divisions, the Status and the Borders of the Intra-City Districts Comprising the "City of Makhachkala" Urban Okrug with Intra-Urban Divisions, and on Amending Various Legislative Acts of the Republic of Dagestan. Effective as of the day of the official publication.).
