= List of people from Dagestan =

This page lists notable people from Dagestan.

== Historical figures ==
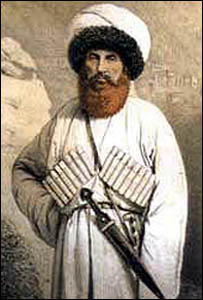
Imam Shamil

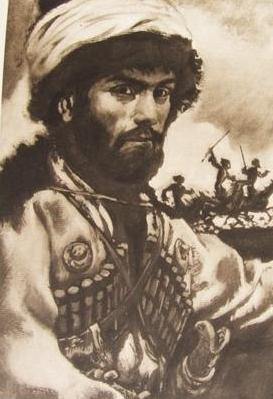
Hadji Murat

- Abdulkhakim Ismailov (1916–2010), World War II soldier. He was photographed by Yevgeny Khaldei raising the flag of the Soviet Union over the Reichstag in Berlin on 2 May 1945, days before Nazi Germany's surrender
- Abdullah ad-Daghestani (1891–1973), Sheikh of the Naqshbandi-Haqqani Sufi order
- Gasret Aliev (1922–1981), soldier, awarded "Hero of Soviet Union" medal
- Ghazi Muhammad (1793–1832), Islamic scholar and ascetic, who was the first Imam of the Caucasian Imamate (from 1828 to 1832)
- Hadji Murad (1795 –1852), Avar leader during the resistance of the peoples of Dagestan and Chechnya in 1811–1864 against the incorporation of the region into the Russian Empire, he was also a rival to Imam Shamil
- Husenil Muhammad Afandi (1862–1967), Muslim spiritual leader, Sheikh of Naqshbandi tariqah
- Imam Shamil (1797–1871), political, military, and spiritual leader of Caucasian resistance to Imperial Russia in the 1800s; his likeness is used within modern times as a symbol of resistance to Russian rule
- Magomet Gadzhiyev (1907–1942), World War II submarine commander and Hero of the Soviet Union
- Maksud Alikhanov (1846–1907), Russian Lieutenant-General, Merv District Head and Tiflis Governor
- Said Afandi al-Chirkawi (1937–2012), spiritual leader of Dagestani Muslims, Sheikh of Naqshbandi and Shazali tariqas
- Shatiel Abramov (1918–2004), World War II battalion commander. Hero of the Soviet Union
- Vazif Meylanov (1940–2015), Soviet dissident, political prisoner, political activist

== Arts ==
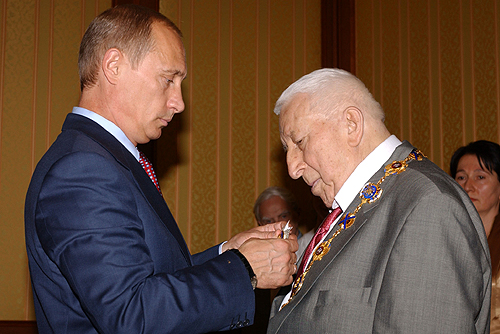
Rasul Gamzatov

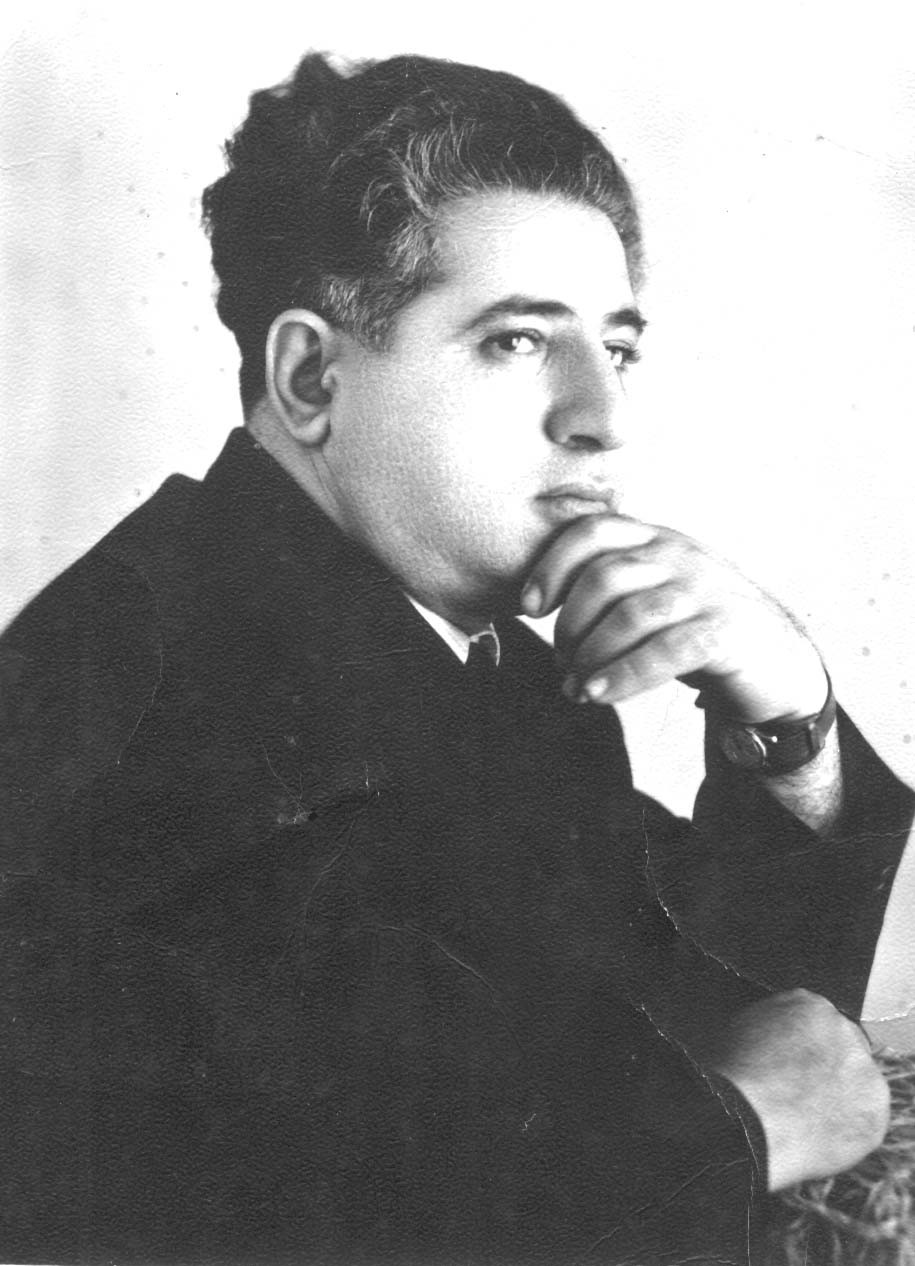
Sergey Izgiyayev

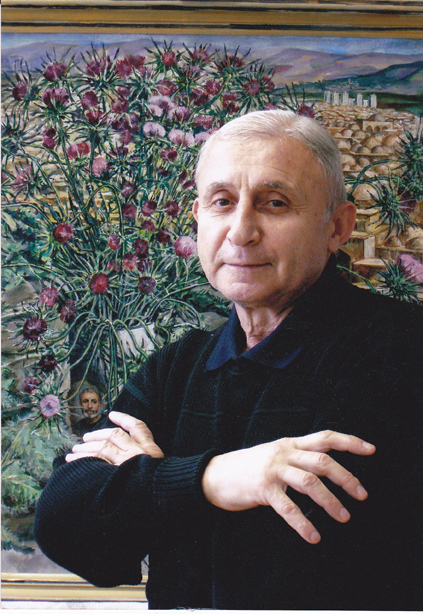
Mushail Mushailov

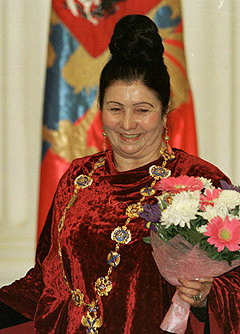
Fazu Aliyeva

=== Literature ===
Writers and authors.

- Hizgil Avshalumov (1913–2001), Soviet novelist, poet, playwright; wrote in Juhuri (language of the Mountain Jews) as well as in Russian

=== Poetry ===
Poets.

- Boris Gavrilov (1908–1990), Mountain Jew Soviet writer, poet, dramatist, founder of the Mountain Jewish school of writing
- Daniil Atnilov (1913–1968), Mountain Jew Soviet poet
- Fazu Aliyeva (1932–2016), poet, novelist and journalist
- Manuvakh Dadashev (1913–1943), Mountain Jew Soviet poet
- Mikhail Gavrilov (1926–2014), Mountain Jew Soviet writer, poet
- Mishi Bakhshiev (1910–1972), Mountain Jew Soviet poet
- Rasul Gamzatov (1923–2003), Avar poet, writer, political activist
- Sergey Izgiyayev (1922–1972), Mountain Jew Soviet poet, playwright, translator
- Suleyman Stalsky (1869–1937), poet
- Zoya Semenduev (1929–2020), Mountain Jew Soviet poet

=== Visual Arts ===
Painters, sculptors, and other visual artists.

- Anatoly Yagudaev (1935–2014), Mountain Jew sculptor, held an honorary title of People's Artist of the Russian Federation
- Eduard Puterbrot (1940–1993), Dagestan artist and member of the USSR Union of Artists
- Israel Tsvaygenbaum (b. 1961), Russian-American artist
- Mushail Mushailov (1941–2007), Mountain Jew painter, member of the USSR Union of Artists and Israel
- Tamara Musakhanov (1924–2014), Mountain Jew sculptor, ceramist, member of the USSR Union of Artists and Israel

=== Music ===
Musicians, composers, and conductors.

- Archil Kereselidze (1912–1971), composer
- Djumshud Ashurov (1913–1980), Mountain Jew Soviet composer
- Gotfrid Hasanov (1900–1965), composer
- Sergei Agababov (1926–1959), composer
- Shirvani Chalaev (b. 1936), composer
- Yuno Avshalumov (1934–1981), Mountain Jew Soviet composer

=== Dance ===
Dancers and choreographers.

- Alla Dzhalilova (1908–1992), ballerina, artist of the Dagestan Autonomous Soviet Socialist Republic
- Tankho Israelov (1917–1981), Mountain Jew ballet dancer, choreographer, People's Artist of the USSR (c. 1978)

=== Performing Arts ===
Actors, actresses, theater directors, and other performing artists.

- Aubri Ibrag (b. 2001), Dagestani-Australian actress
- Hasbulla Magomedov (b. 2002) Comedian, entertainer and internet sensation
- Musaib Dzhum-Dzhum (1905–1974), Soviet theatre director

== Boxing ==
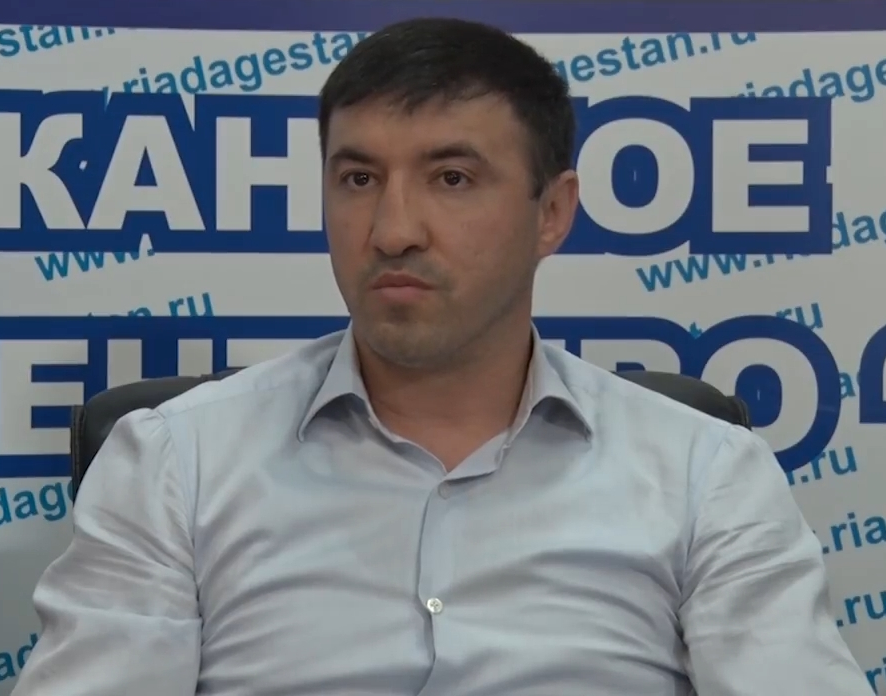
Gaydarbek Gaydarbekov

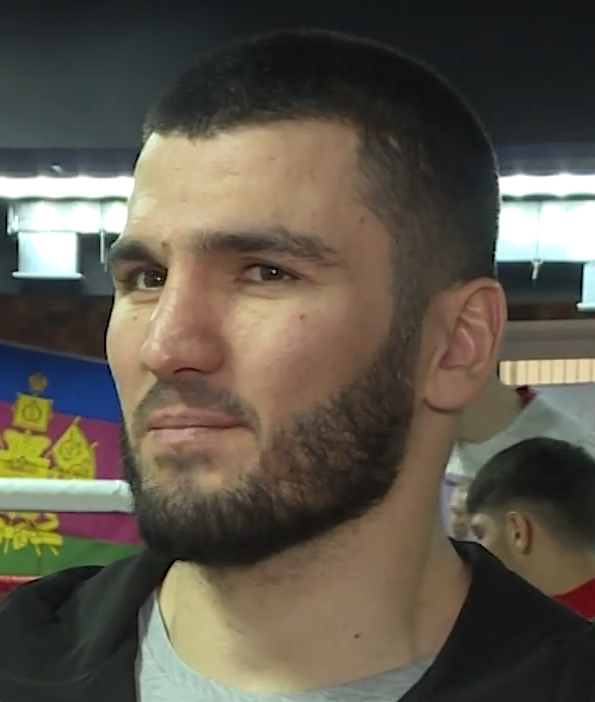
Artur Beterbiev

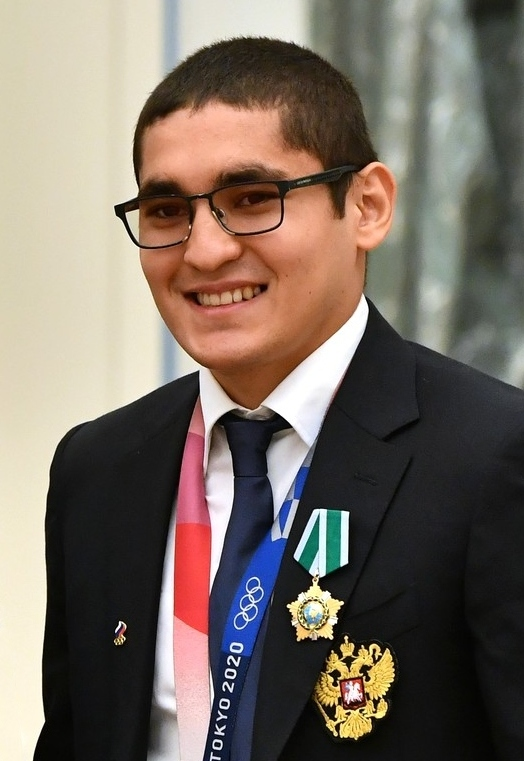
Albert Batyrgaziev

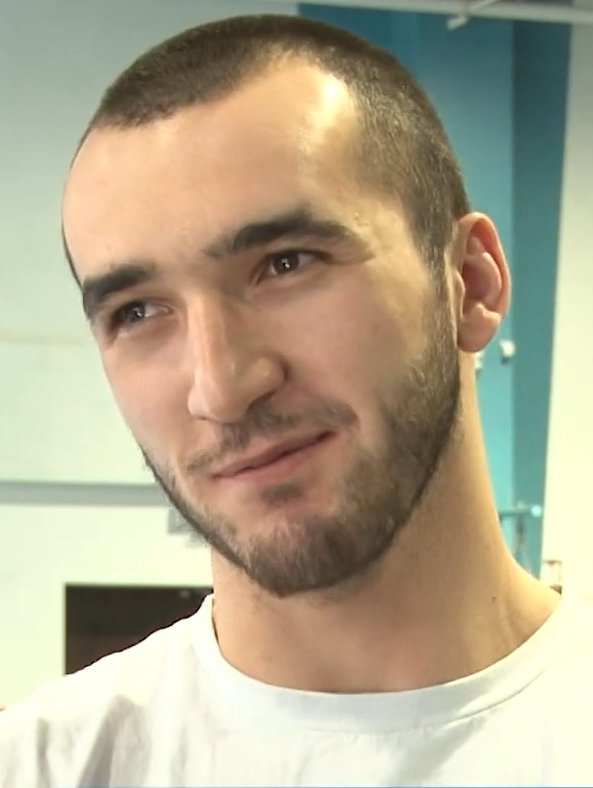
Muslim Gadzhimagomedov

- Abdulkadir Abdullayev (b. 1988), In 2015 he won a gold medal at the European Games and a bronze at the world championships
- Albert Batyrgaziev (b. 1998), Winner of the gold medal in the featherweight division at the 2020 Summer Olympics
- Albert Selimov (b. 1986), He is best known for being the only man to defeat Vasyl Lomachenko in the amateur ranks. Competing for Russia he won the 2007 world title, the 2008 World Cup, and two European titles, in 2006 and 2010
- Ali Alnoiyev (b. 1983), Russian amateur boxer best known for winning the 2006 European Amateur Boxing Championships
- Arslanbek Makhmudov (b. 1989), Russian professional boxer who has held the WBC-NABF heavyweight title since 2019
- Arthur Biyarslanov (b. 1995), Undefeated professional boxer who won a gold medal in the Pan American Games, and competed in the 2016 Summer Olympics
- Artur Beterbiev (b. 1985), ethnic Chechen, raised in Dagestan, Professional Boxer who is currently holding the IBF light-heavyweight title since 2017 and the WBC light heavyweight title since 2019
- Dzhambulat Bizhamov 2021 silver medalist at world championship, many times young European champion, world young champion, 2 time Russian champion of boxing.
- Gaydarbek Gaydarbekov (b. 1976), Boxer of Avar heritage, who has won two Olympic medals in Middleweight including the gold medal at the 2004 Summer Olympics.Today he is perhaps best known for defeating future boxing superstar Gennady Golovkin in the 2004 Olympic finals
- Gazimagomed Jalidov (b. 1995), olympian at 2020 Summer Olympics, arrived in Spain as a refugee in 2004
- Kamil Djamaloudinov (b. 1979), won the bronze medal in the featherweight division (– 57 kg) at the 2000 Summer Olympics in Sydney, Australia
- Khabib Allakhverdiev (b. 1982), professional Boxer; former WBA, IBO, Super Welterweight champion
- Magomed Abdulhamidov (b. 1986), olympic boxer who garnered mainstream attention when he was controversially disqualified during the 2012 Olympic Games several hours after he was initially declared the winner of his bronze medal match
- Magomed Abdusalamov (b. 1981), is a Russian former heavyweight professional boxer who competed from 2008 to 2013; in 2013, Abdusalamov was forced to retire from the sport due to severe brain injuries sustained during his only career defeat
- Magomed Aripgadjiev (b. 1977), won a silver medal in the light heavyweight division (– 81 kg) at the 2004 Summer Olympics
- Magomed Kurbanov (b. 1995), undefeated Russian professional boxer who fights as a light middleweight
- Magomed Omarov (b. 1989), super Heavyweight amateur boxer best known to win the 2011 European Amateur Boxing Championships
- Magomed Nurutdinov Welterweight boxer 2008 European champion, 2005 World vice-champion.
- Magomedrasul Majidov (b. 1986), won a bronze medal in the super-heavyweight division (+91 kg) at the 2012 Summer Olympics and gold medals at the 2017, 2013 and 2011 World Championship
- Muslim Gadzhimagomedov (b. 1997), won a silver medal at the 2020 Summer Olympics in the Heavyweight division
- Nurmagomed Shanavazov (b. 1965), best known for handling Riddick Bowe his first defeat at an international competition
- Radzhab Butaev (b. 1995), Russian professional boxer former WBA (Regular) welterweight champion.
- Ruslan Khairov (b. 1976), He competed in the Welterweight (– 69 kg) division, and won bronze medals at the 2003 World Amateur Boxing Championships and 2004 European Amateur Boxing Championships
- Sultan Ibragimov(b. 1975), retired professional boxer held the WBO heavyweight title from 2007 to 2008. As an amateur he won silver medals at the 2000 Olympics and 2000 European Championships, and bronze at the 2001 World Championships, all in the heavyweight division.
- Sharabutdin Ataev, 2023 World and 2024 European champion of boxing in the cruiserweight division.
- Vadim Musaev, IBO world champion in the welterweight division.
- Zemfira Magomedalieva (b.1988) won a bronze medal in Boxing at the 2020 Summer Olympics at Women's middleweight

== Business and Politics ==
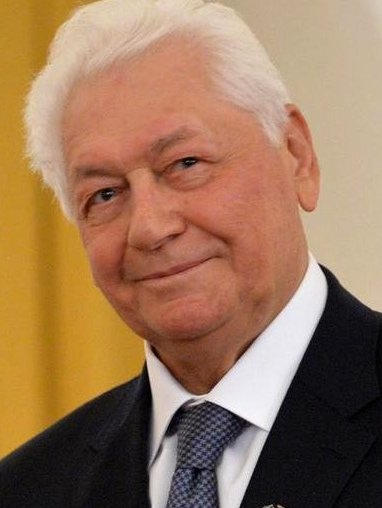
Magomedali Magomedov

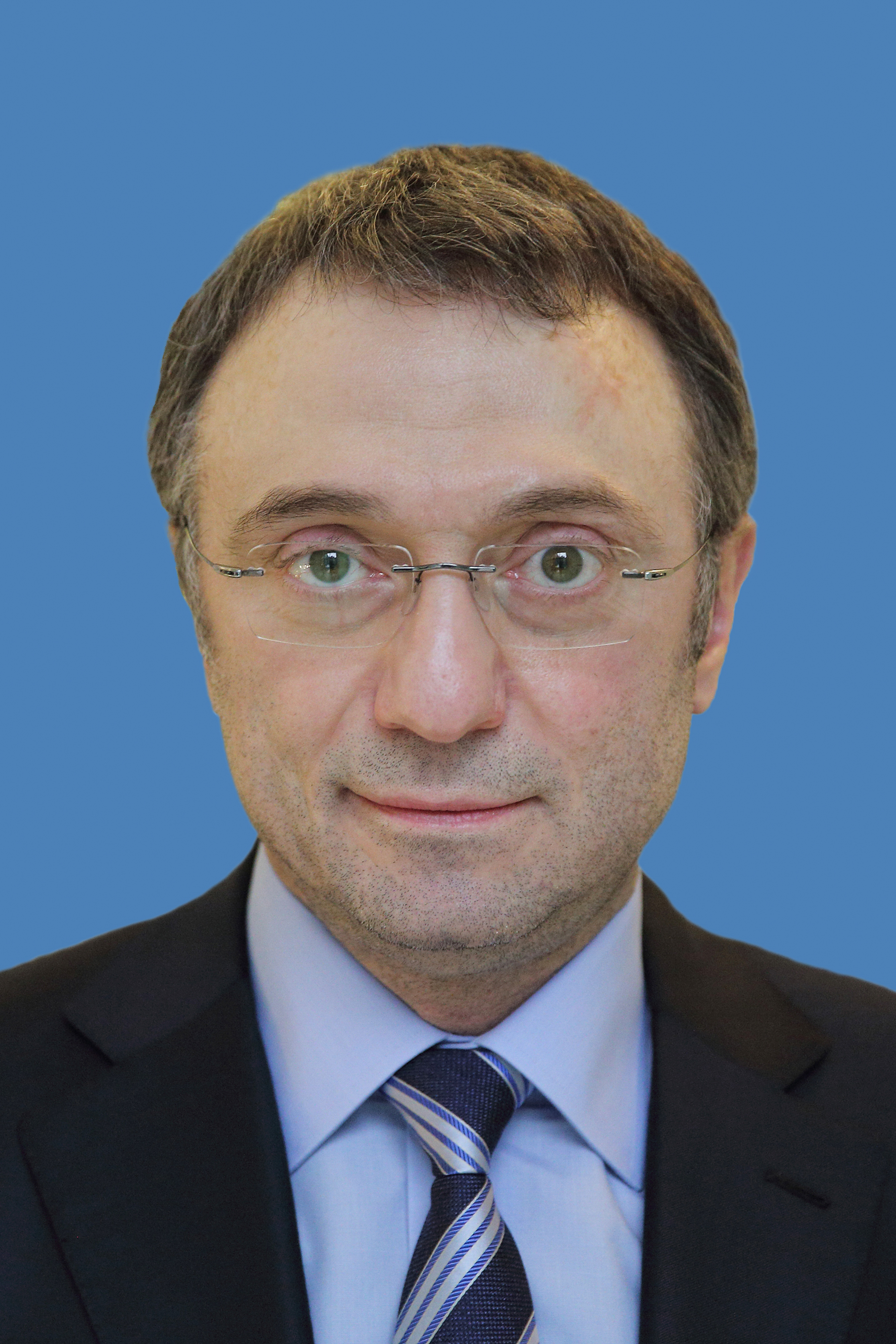
Suleyman Kerimov

- Adam Amirilayev (b. 1967), politician
- Ahmad Afandi Abdulaev (b. 1959), mufti of Dagestan
- Magomedali Magomedov (b. 1930), politician who served as the Head of the State Council of Dagestan from 1992 to 2006
- Magomedsalam Magomedov (b. 1964), politician who served as Head of the Republic of Dagestan. Son of Magomedali Magomedov
- Mukhu Aliyev (b. 1940), politician who served as Head of the Republic of Dagestan
- Ramazan Abdulatipov (b. 1946), politician who served as Head of the Republic of Dagestan
- Sevil Novruzova (c. 1977), lawyer, advocate for returning former Islamist insurgents
- Suleyman Kerimov (b. 1966), businessman, investor, philanthropist and politician; featured on Forbes list as one of the richest people in Russia; founded the Suleyman Kerimov Foundation as a vehicle for charitable projects
- Ramazan Abdulatipov (b. 1946), politician who served as Head of the Republic of Dagestan
- Ziyavudin Magomedov (b. 1968), Russian billionaire businessman

== Fencing ==
- Vladimir Nazlymov (b. 1945), six-time medalist in fencing in the Olympic Games, including three team gold medals

== Football ==
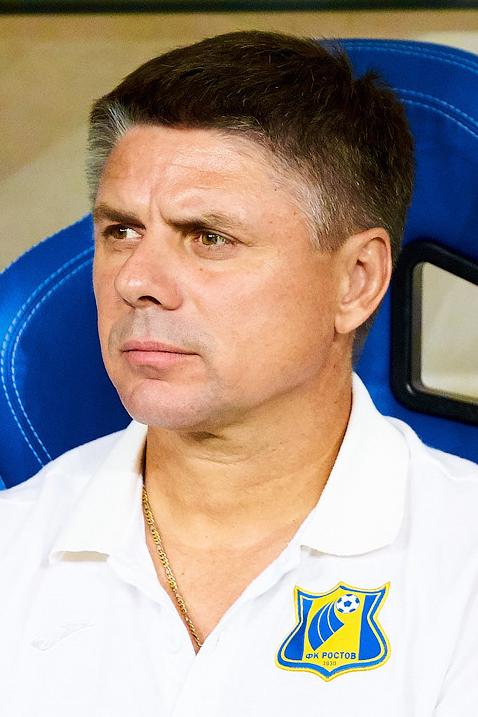
Aleksandr Maslov

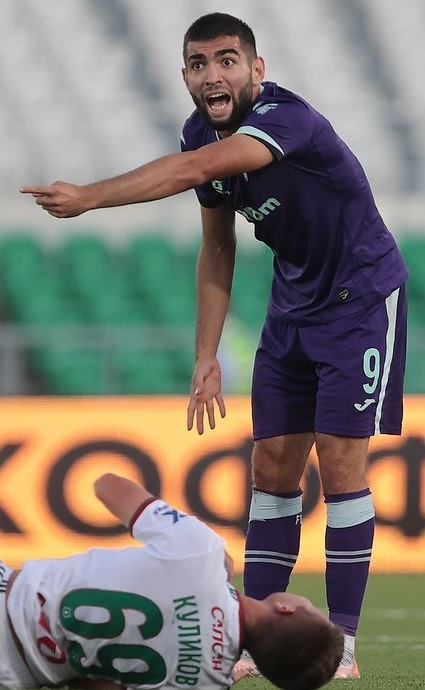
Gamid Agalarov

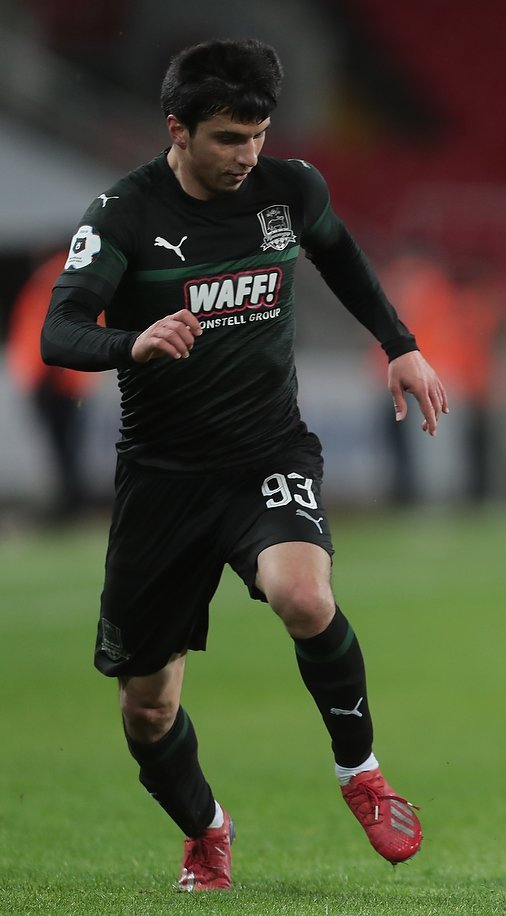
Magomed-Shapi Suleymanov

- Amir Ibragimov U18 Manchester United player and England U-16 player, playing forward.
- Adil Ibragimov (b. 1989), football player
- Akhmed Kurbanov (b. 1986), former football player
- Albert Gadzhibekov (b. 1988), former professional football player of Lezgin descent
- Aleksandr Maslov (b. 1969), football coach, former player
- Ali Gadzhibekov (b. 1989), football player of Lezgin descent
- Alibek Aliev (b. 1996), born in Russia, represents Sweden internationally, relocated to Sweden at the age of six
- Alikadi Saidov (b. 1999), football player
- Amir Gasanov (b. 1987), former professional football player
- Anvar Gazimagomedov (b. 1988), professional football player, plays as a right midfielder
- Arslan Aydemirov (b. 1977), former midfielder
- Arslan Khalimbekov (b. 1967), former midfielder, manager
- Azim Fatullayev (b. 1986), defensive midfielder, centre back
- Dzhamal Dibirgadzhiyev (b. 1996), striker, forward
- Gadzhi Bamatov (b. 1982), former Forward (association football)
- Gamid Agalarov (b. 2000), centre-forward
- Islamnur Abdulavov (b. 1994), forward
- Kamalutdin Akhmedov (b. 1986), former defender
- Kamil Agalarov (b. 1988), Right Back
- Magomed-Shapi Suleymanov (b. 1999), winger
- Mahammad Mirzabeyov (b. 1990), right back
- Mehdi Jannatov (b. 1992), Goalkeeper
- Mikhail Kupriyanov (b. 1973), manager, former defender
- Murad Hüseynov (b. 1989), forward
- Murad Magomedov (b. 1973), defender, holds an Israeli identity card
- Mutalip Alibekov (b. 1997), centre back
- Nikita Chistyakov (b. 2000), left-back
- Nikita Timoshin (b. 1988), defender, midfielder
- Ramazan Isayev (b. 1998), forward
- Rasim Tagirbekov (b. 1984), defender, midfielder of Lezgin descent
- Ruslan Agalarov (b. 1974), midfielder
- Rustam Gadzhiyev (b. 1978), defender
- Rustam Khalimbekov (b. 1996), defender, midfielder
- Said Aliyev (b. 1998), forward
- Serder Serderov (b. 1994), winger, forward
- Sergei Dementyev (b. 1971), former midfielder
- Sergei Kozhanov (b. 1964), defender, midfielder, striker
- Shamil Asildarov (b. 1983), striker
- Shamil Gasanov (b. 1993), defender, midfielder
- Shamil Lakhiyalov (b. 1979), former forward of Avar ethnicity
- Shamil Saidov (b. 1982), former goalkeeper
- Sharif Mukhammad (b. 1990), centre back, defensive midfielder
- Valiabdula Magomedov (b. 1986), former midfielder
- Viktor Kuzmichyov (b. 1992), midfielder, defender
- Yuri Udunyan (b. 1994), midfielder, defender

== Judo ==
- Mansur Isaev (b. 1986), In 2012, he won the gold medal in judo at the 2012 Summer Olympics
- Rasul Salimov (b. 1981), won a bronze medal at the 2001 World Judo Championships
- Tagir Khaybulaev (b. 1984), In the 2012 Summer Olympics, Khaybulaev won a gold medal for Judo
- Nazim Huseynov (b. 1969) of Lezgin origin, olympic champion of the 1992 edition in the 60kg category.
- Renat Saidov (b. 1988) Olympian, won the Tokyo 2014 Grand Slam and the 2014 and 2016 Grand prix in Judo.
- Murad Chopanov (b. 1998), won gold medals at the 2021 Kazan, 2024 Astana and 2024 Abu Dhabi Grand Slam's.
- Ramazan Abdulaev (b. 1998), gold medals at the 2023 Baku, 2024 Baku, 2024 Astana and 2023 Dushanbe Grand Slam's.

== Mixed martial arts ==
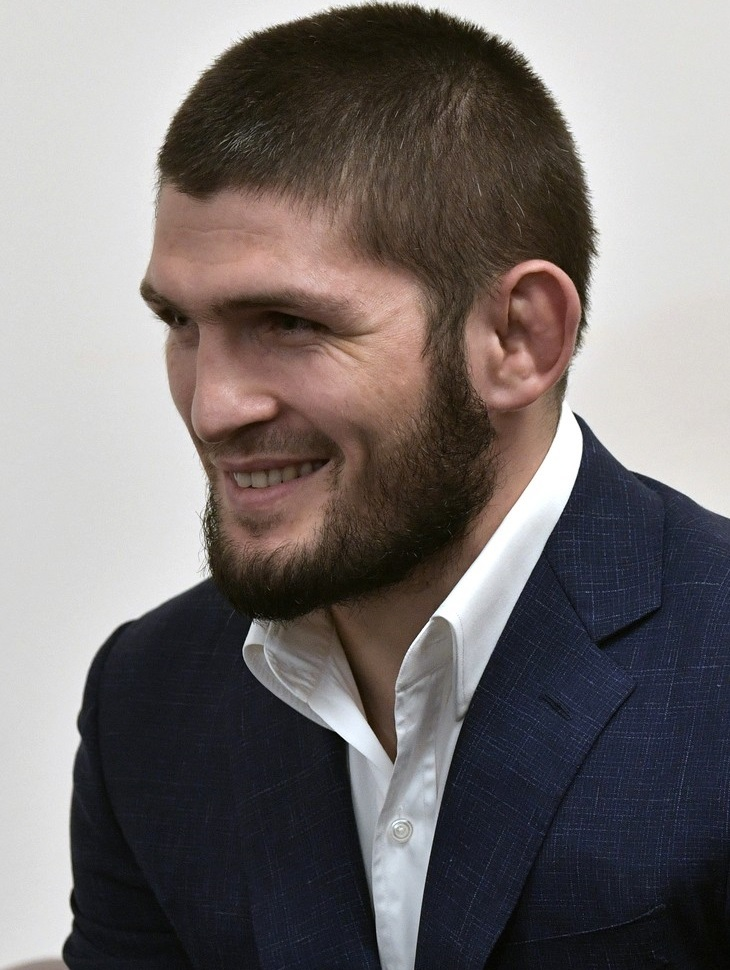
Khabib Nurmagomedov

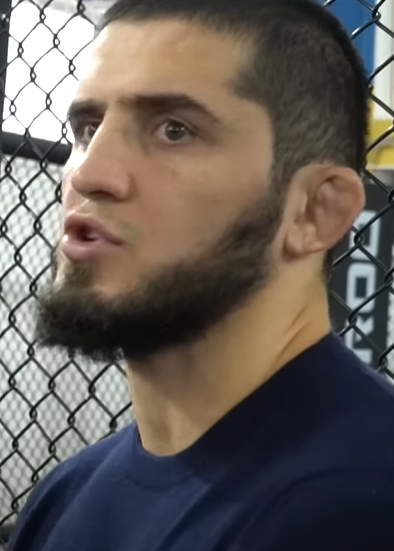
Islam Makhachev

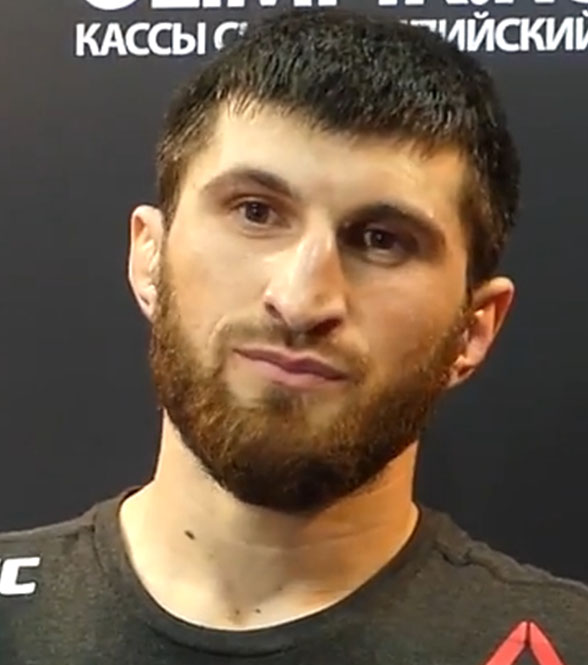
Magomed Ankalaev

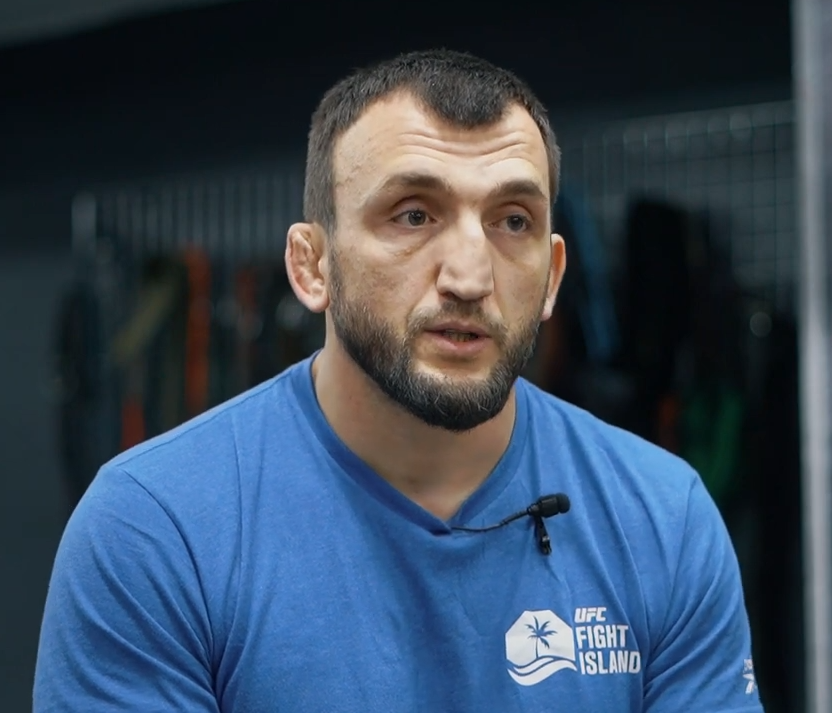
Muslim Salikhov

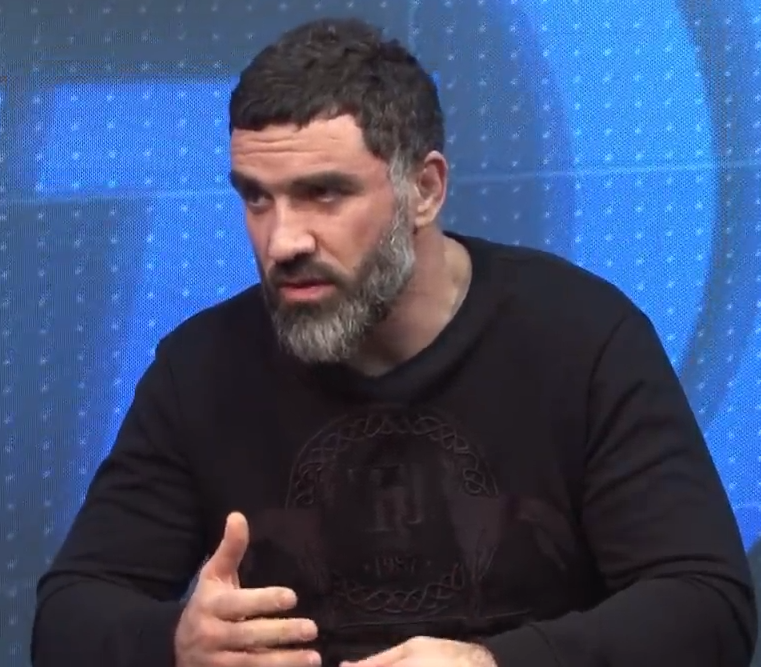
Bozigit Ataev

- Abdulmanap Nurmagomedov (1962–2020), late founder and head trainer of Eagles MMA, the head training camp for all Dagestani Combat Sports Athletes; father and coach of former UFC lightweight champion Khabib Nurmagomedov
- Abubakar Nurmagomedov (b. 1989), MMA Fighter previously competed in the UFC's Welterweight division
- Ali Bagautinov (b. 1985), former UFC fighter in the flyweight division. Combat Sambo World Champion
- Askar Askarov (b. 1992), former UFC fighter in the flyweight division. 2017 Summer Deaflympics 61 kg freestyle wrestling gold medalist
- Bozigit Ataev (b. 1979), MMA Fighter for Professional Fighters League, known for a fierce spinning heel kick and Sambo style grappling
- Gadzhimurad Antigulov (b. 1987), MMA Fighter previously competed in the UFC's Lightheavyweight division
- Gasan Umalatov (b. 1982), MMA Fighter previously competed in the UFC's Middleweight division
- Ikram Aliskerov (b. 1992), World Combat Sambo Champion, and UFC fighter from Russia
- Islam Makhachev (b. 1991), Former UFC lightweight champion of the world, current welterweight champion and current number 1 ranked pound for pound fighter in the UFC.
- Islam Mamedov (b. 1989?), MMA Fighter currently competing in the PFL
- Karimula Barkalaev (b. 1973), former MMA fighter who is the only Russian national to have won at the ADCC Submission Fighting World Championship
- Khabib Nurmagomedov (b. 1988), Former UFC fighter in the lightweight division, retiring in 2020 as undisputed lightweight champion and former No. 1 pound-for-pound UFC fighter
- Magomed Ankalaev (b. 1992), Former UFC Light Heavyweight Champion
- Magomed Mustafaev (b. 1988), MMA Fighter previously competed in the UFC's Lightweight division
- Magomedkhan Amanulayevich Gamzatkhanov (b. 1961), Gamzatkhanov is better known by his ringname "Volk Han", Russian MMA pioneer, head trainer for Fedor Emelianenko; retired w/ a record of 21-8-1
- Magomedrasul Khasbulaev (b. 1986), nicknamed "Frodo", mixed martial artist of Avar heritage at one time fought in the Featherweight division for the Bellator Fighting Championships
- Muslim Salikhov (b. 1984), known for being the only non-Chinese "King of sanda", Muslim Salikhov is often acknowledged as one of the best Wushu Sanda competitors in history; current UFC fighter in the welterweight division
- Omari Akhmedov (b. 1987), MMA Fighter previously competed in the UFC's Middleweight division
- Ramazan Emeev (b. 1987), MMA Fighter currently competing in the UFC's Middleweight division
- Rashid Magomedov (b. 1984), MMA Fighter previously competed in the UFC's Lightweight division
- Rasul Mirzaev (b. 1986), World Combat Sambo champion, and MMA Fighter currently competing in the Featherweight division
- Ruslan Ashuraliyev (1950–2009), was 2 time world champion and Olympic Bronze Medalist; served two terms in the Dagestani parliament
- Ruslan Magomedov (b. 1986), MMA Fighter currently competing in the UFC's Heavyweight division
- Rustam Khabilov (b. 1986), MMA Fighter previously competed in the UFC's Lightweight division; Combat Sambo World Champion
- Said Nurmagomedov (b. 1992), MMA Fighter currently competing in the UFC's Welterweight Division
- Saparbek Safarov (b. 1986), MMA Fighter previously competed in the UFC's Light Heavyweight Division
- Shamil Abdurakhimov (b. 1981), MMA Fighter previously competed in the UFC's Heavyweight division
- Shamil Gamzatov (b. 1990), MMA Fighter previously competed in the UFC's Light Heavyweight division
- Shamil Gaziev (b. 1990), MMA Fighter currently competing in the UFC's Heavyweight division
- Shamil Zavurov (b. 1984), Combat Sambo World champion (x3) and MMA fighter currently competing in both the Lightweight and Welterweight divisions
- Sultan Aliev (b. 1984), MMA Fighter currently competing in the UFC's Welterweight division
- Umar Nurmagomedov (b. 1996), MMA Fighter currently competing in the UFC's Bantamweight division
- Usman Nurmagomedov (b. 1998) MMA Fighter currently competing in the Bellator's Lightweight division
- Zabit Magomedsharipov (b. 1991), MMA Fighter previously competed in the UFC's Featherweight division
- Shara Magomedov (b. 1994), MMA Fighter currently competing in the UFC's Middleweight division

== Muay Thai ==
- Alaverdi Ramazanov (b. 1994), Russian Muay Thai kickboxer who is currently signed to ONE Championship. He is the inaugural and reigning ONE Kickboxing Bantamweight World Champion; Ramazanov is also a former 3-time IFMA Muay Thai World Champion and 12-time Russian national Muay Thai champion
- Dzhabar Askerov (b. 1986), he is the World Muay Thai Council's Muay Thai Welterweight European Champion and K-1 MAX Scandinavia 2008 Tournament Finalist
- Magomed Magomedov (b. 1982), the professional WMC and IMF Light Heavyweight World Muay Thai Champion
- Ramazan Ramazanov (b. 1984), nicknamed "The Punisher", Ramazanov is a multiple time Muay Thai world champion
- Jamal Yusupov ONE FC contender in the Muay Thai Lightweight division.
- Beybulat Isaev
- Islam Murtazaev

== Swimming ==
- Ruslan Gaziev swimmer for the Canadian national team and 2022 world silver medalist.

== Taekwondo ==
- Patimat Abakarova (b. 1994), First female athlete from Dagestan region to medal in the Olympics, via a bronze medal in Taekwondo during the 2016 Olympic Games
- Radik Isayev (b. 1984), Gold medalist at 2016 Summer Olympics
- Gashim Magomedov (b. 1999), Silver medalist at 2024 Summer Olympics

== Wrestling ==
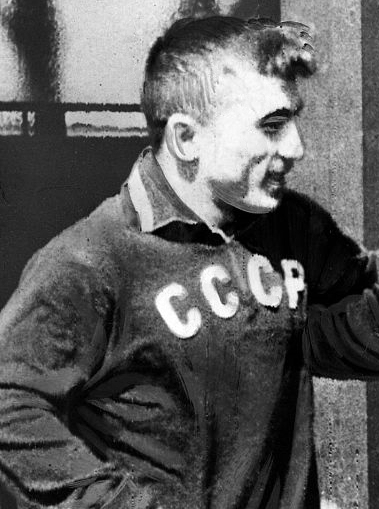
Ali Aliyev

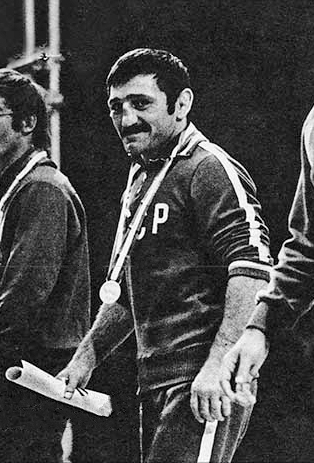
Zagalav Abdulbekov

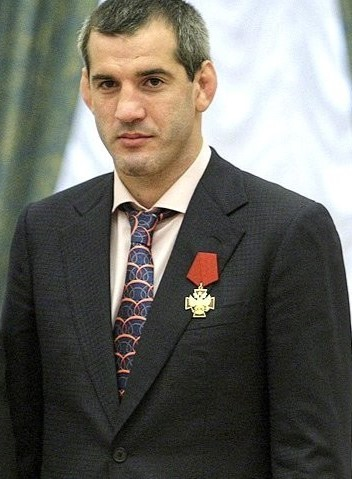
Buvaisar Saitiev

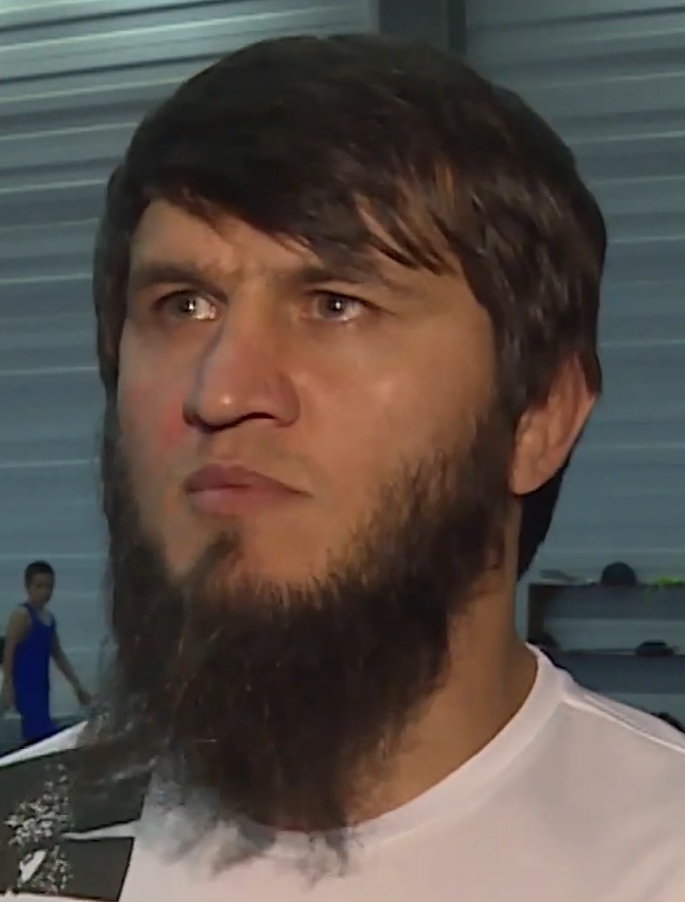
Mavlet Batirov

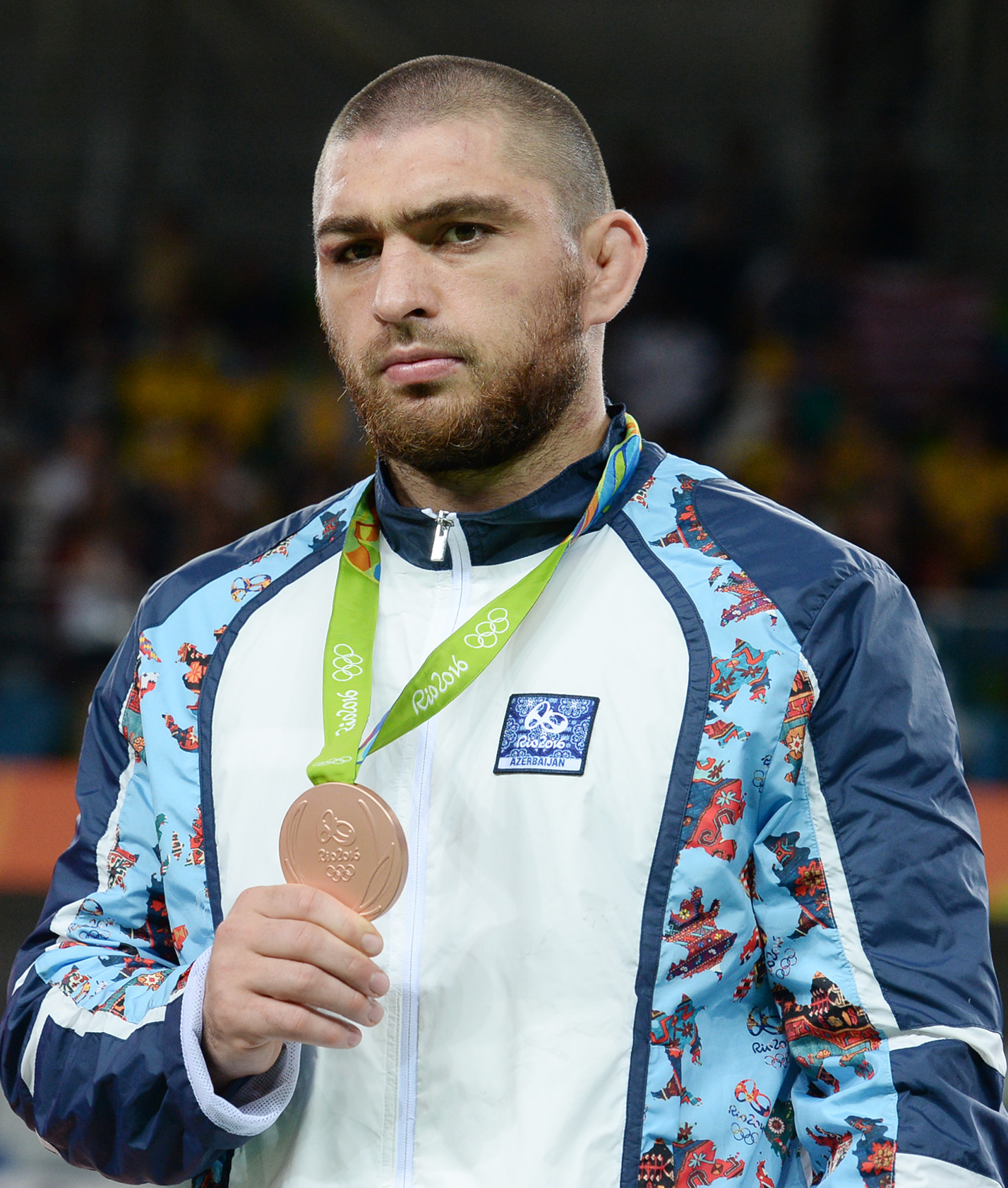
Sharif Sharifov

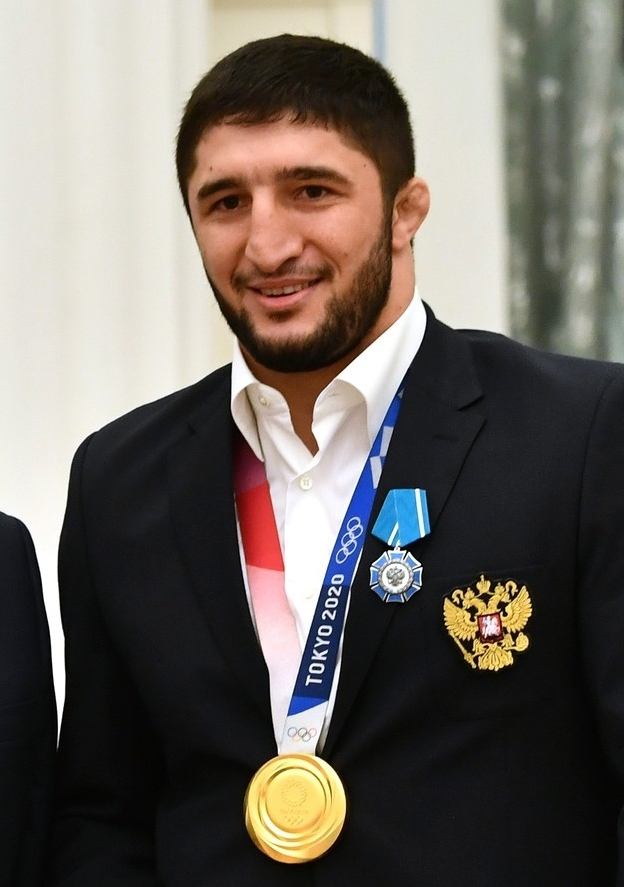
Abdulrashid Sadulaev

- Abdulrashid Sadulaev (b. 1996), freestyle wrestler, a three-time World Champion (2014, 2015, 2018), European Champion (2014), European Games Champion (2015), two time Cadet World Champion (2012, 2013), Golden Grand-Prix Champion, Olympic Gold Medalist (2016, 2020)
- Abdusalam Gadisov (b. 1989), 2014 Freestyle Wrestling World Champion
- Adam Batirov (b. 1985), Olympic Wrestler, 2018 World Championship Runner-up; Younger brother of Mavlet Batirov
- Adam Saitiev (b. 1977), Russia's freestyle wrestler, a Chechen, Russian Master of sports of international class, Honored Master of Sports of Russia (2000), three-time champion of Russia (1999, 2000, 2002), three-time champion Europe (1999, 2000, 2006), two-time world champion (1999, 2002), Olympic champion (2000)
- Ali Aliyev (1937–1995), Avar Dagestani-born Soviet Union freestyle wrestler, won five world titles
- Ali Isaev (b. 1983), Olympic Heavyweight Freestyle Wrestler, Undefeated MMA Fighter
- Bekkhan Goygereyev (b. 1987), a Chechen wrestler who won the gold medal at the 2013 World Wrestling Championships
- Buvaisar Saitiev (1975–2025), Russia's freestyle wrestler, a Chechen three-time Olympic champion, six-time world champion, six-time European champion, five-time Russian champion, seven-time winner of the tournament Krasnoyarsk Ivan Yarygin winner Goodwill Games will. Saitiev was a State Duma Deputy from Dagestan from 2016 to 2021.
- Dzhamal Otarsultanov (b. 1987), won the gold medal in men's freestyle 55 kg at the 2012 London Olympics
- Khadzhimurad Magomedov (b. 1974), Olympic gold medalist, two time world wrestling champion
- Kuramagomed Kuramagomedov (b. 1978), freestyle wrestler who competed for Russia in the 2000 Summer Olympics, won a world title in 1997
- Magomed Ibragimov (b. 1974), three time Olympian for Freestyle Wrestling; Bronze Medalist at the 2000 Summer Olympics
- Magomed Kurbanaliev (b. 1992), freestyle wrestler, World freestyle wrestling champion 2016 in 70 kg
- Magomedkhan Aratsilov (b. 1951), former wrestler who competed in the 1980 Summer Olympics
- Magomedrasul Gazimagomedov (b. 1991), won gold medal at the 2015 World Wrestling Championships at Men's freestyle 70 kg, training partner of Khabib Nurmagomedov
- Magomed Ibragimov (b. 1985), Bronze Medalist on freestyle wrestling during 2016 Olympic Games
- Mahamedkhabib Kadzimahamedau (b. 1994), Olympic Silver Medalist (2020)
- Makhach Murtazaliev (b. 1984), Russian Olympic wrestler who won the bronze medal for Russia at the 2004 Summer Olympics in Athens
- Marid Mutalimov (b. 1980), 2008 Bronze Medalist in freestyle wrestling during the Olympic Games
- Mavlet Batirov (b. 1983), freestyle wrestler, world and two time Olympic champion, competed in the men's freestyle 55 kg category at the 2004 Summer Olympics and won the gold medal
- Magomedgasan Abushev (b. 1959), Olympic Gold Medalist (1980) in Freestyle wrestling
- Murad Umakhanov (b. 1977), Umakhanov competed at the 2000 Summer Olympics in Sydney where he received a gold medal in Freestyle wrestling
- Ramazan Şahin (b. 1983), Irbaikhanov – a Chechen Olympic Gold Medalist (2008), World Champion (2007) in Freestyle wrestling
- Sagid Murtazaliev (b. 1974), two time World champion, Olympic champion in Freestyle wrestling
- Saypulla Absaidov (b. 1958), Olympic champion and World Champion 1981 in Freestyle wrestling
- Sazhid Sazhidov (b. 1980), Russian Olympic wrestler who represented Russia at the world-level from 2003 to 2006, won the bronze medal at the 2004 Athens Olympics
- Sharif Sharifov (b. 1988), Olympic Gold Medalist (2012), World Champion (2011) in Freestyle wrestling
- Shirvani Muradov (b. 1985), wrestler, who has won a gold medal at the 2008 Summer Olympics and European champion 2007
- Yusup Abdusalomov (b. 1977), Silver Medalist during the 2008 Olympic Games in freestyle wrestling
- Zagalav Abdulbekov (b. 1945), two time world champion, Olympic Gold Medalist in freestyle wrestling, coach of the Soviet freestyle wrestling team between 1974 and 1980
- Zaur Uguev (b. 1995), claimed the 2020 Summer Olympic Games gold medal after back-to-back World Championships in 2018 and 2019, as well as a 2020 Individual World Cup title; first fighter to ever be signed by UFC without ever competing in MMA
