= Gonokh =

Gonokh Гонох
- Selo
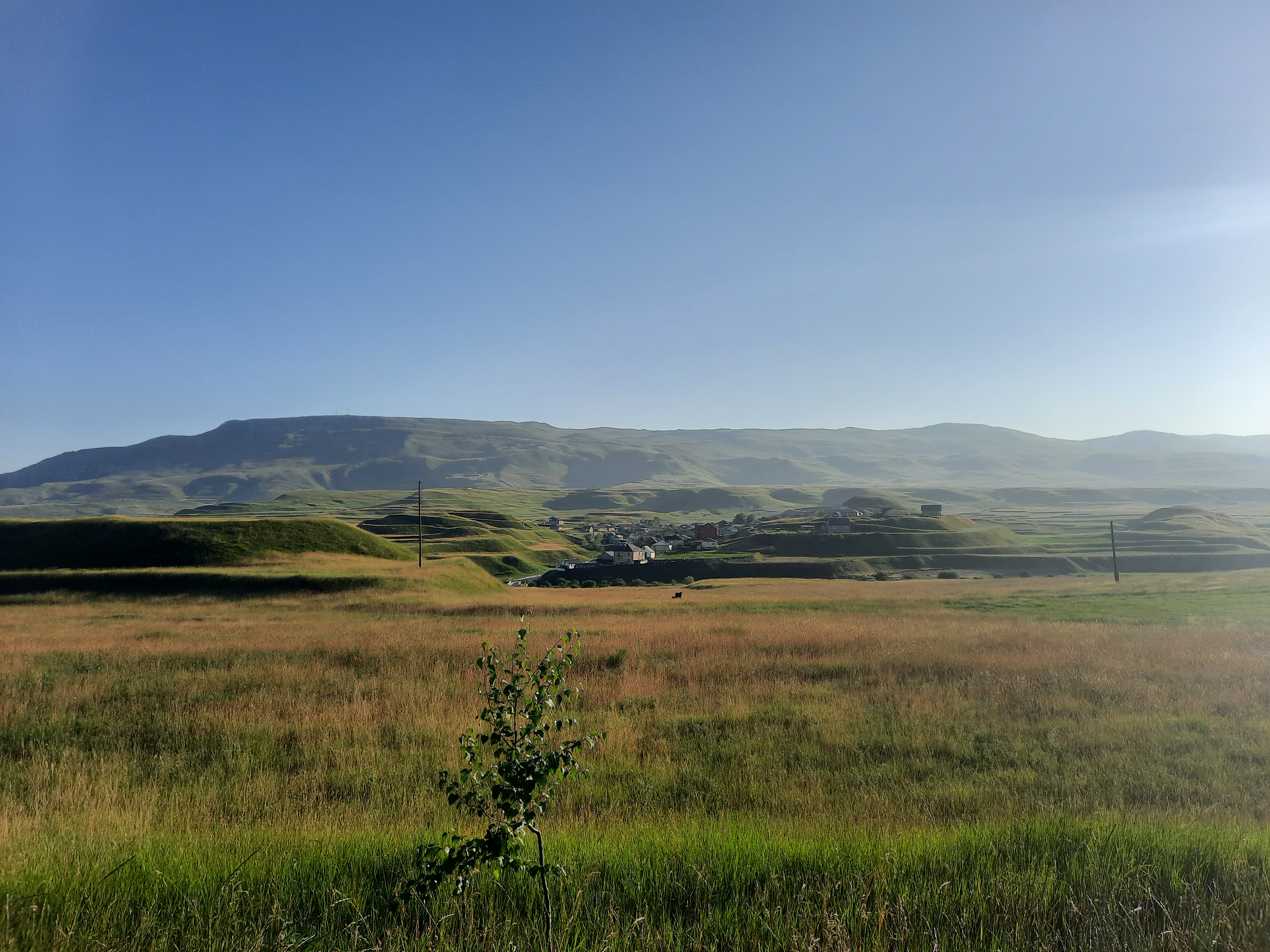
- Gonokh

- Location within Republic of Dagestan Location within Russia
- Coordinates: 42°33′N 46°41′E
- Country: Russia
- Region: Republic of Dagestan
- District: Khunzakhsky District
- Time zone: UTC+3:00

Gonokh (Russian: Гонох) is a rural locality (a selo) in Khunzakhsky Selsoviet, Khunzakhsky District, Republic of Dagestan, Russia. Population: 372 (2010 census); 337 (2002 census); 223 (1989 Soviet census). There are 5 streets in this selo.

== Geography ==
It is located 3 km from Khunzakh (the district's administrative centre), 80 km from Makhachkala (capital of Dagestan) and 1,644 km from Moscow. Baitl is the nearest rural locality.
