= Uzdalroso =

Uzdalroso Уздалросо
- Selo
- Location within Republic of Dagestan Location within Russia
- Coordinates: 42°29′N 46°51′E
- Country: Russia
- Region: Republic of Dagestan
- District: Khunzakhsky District
- Time zone: UTC+3:00

Uzdalroso (Russian: Уздалросо) is a rural locality (a selo) and the administrative center of Uzdalrosinsky Selsoviet, Khunzakhsky District, Republic of Dagestan, Russia. Population: 873 (2010 census); 706 (2002 census); 493 (1989 Soviet census). There are 16 streets in this selo.

== Geography ==
It is located 14 km from Khunzakh (the district's administrative centre), 75 km from Makhachkala (capital of Dagestan) and 1,658 km from Moscow. Tagada is the nearest rural locality.
