= Orota =

Orota Орота
- Selo
- Location within Republic of Dagestan Location within Russia
- Coordinates: 42°39′N 46°32′E
- Country: Russia
- Region: Republic of Dagestan
- District: Khunzakhsky District
- Time zone: UTC+3:00

Orota (Russian: Орота) is a rural locality (a selo) in Khunzakhsky District, Republic of Dagestan, Russia. Population: 1,665 (2021 census); 1,657 (2002 census); 1,130 (1989 Soviet census). There are 10 streets in this selo.

== Geography ==
It is located 19 km from Khunzakh (the district's administrative centre), 86 km from Makhachkala (capital of Dagestan) and 1,629 km from Moscow. Kharakhi is the nearest rural locality.
