= Butsra =

Butsra Буцра
- Selo
- Location within Republic of Dagestan Location within Russia
- Coordinates: 42°33′N 46°46′E
- Country: Russia
- Region: Republic of Dagestan
- District: Khunzakhsky District
- Time zone: UTC+3:00

Butsra (Russian: Буцра) is a rural locality (a selo) in Khunzakhsky District, Republic of Dagestan, Russia. The population was 1,447 (2021 census); 1,434 (2002 census); 840 (1989 Soviet census). There are 16 streets in this selo.

== Geography ==
It is located 8 kilometres (5.0 mi) from Khunzakh (the district's administrative centre), 73 kilometres (45 mi) from Makhachkala (capital of Dagestan) and 1,644 kilometres (1,022 mi) from Moscow. Genichutl is the nearest rural locality.
