= Shotoda =

Shotoda Шотода
- Selo
- Location within Republic of Dagestan Location within Russia
- Coordinates: 42°34′N 46°34′E
- Country: Russia
- Region: Republic of Dagestan
- District: Khunzakhsky District
- Time zone: UTC+3:00

Shotoda (Russian: Шотода) is a rural locality (a selo) in Khunzakhsky District, Republic of Dagestan, Russia. Population: 391 (2021 census); 293 (2002 census); 122 (1989 Soviet census). There are 3 streets in this selo.

== Geography ==
It is located 11 km from Khunzakh (the district's administrative centre), 87 km from Makhachkala (capital of Dagestan) and 1,638 km from Moscow. Arani is the nearest rural locality.
