= Gozolokolo =

Gozolokolo Гозолоколо
- Selo
- Location within Republic of Dagestan Location within Russia
- Coordinates: 42°34′N 46°36′E
- Country: Russia
- Region: Republic of Dagestan
- District: Khunzakhsky District
- Time zone: UTC+3:00

Gozolokolo (Russian: Гозолоколо) is a rural locality (a selo) in Obodinsky Selsoviet, Khunzakhsky District, Republic of Dagestan, Russia. Population: 164 (2010 census); 177 (2002 census); 125 (1989 Soviet census). There are 3 streets in this selo.

== Geography ==
It is located 8 km from Khunzakh (the district's administrative centre), 85 km from Makhachkala (capital of Dagestan) and 1,641 km from Moscow. Tumagari is the nearest rural locality.
