= Khalimbekov =

Khalimbekov (Russian: Халимбеков) is a Russian surname. Notable people with the surname include:

- Arslan Khalimbekov (born 1967), Russian football manager
- Rustam Khalimbekov (born 1996), Russian football player
