= Siukh, Khunzakhsky District, Republic of Dagestan =

Siukh Сиух
- Selo
- Location within Republic of Dagestan Location within Russia
- Coordinates: 42°35′N 46°32′E
- Country: Russia
- Region: Republic of Dagestan
- District: Khunzakhsky District
- Time zone: UTC+3:00

Siukh (Russian: Сиух) is a rural locality (a selo) and the administrative center of Siukhsky Selsoviet, Khunzakhsky District, Republic of Dagestan, Russia. Population: 277 (2010 census); 310 (2002 census); 245 (1989 Soviet census). There are three streets in this selo.

== Geography ==
It is located 15 km from Khunzakh (the district's administrative centre), 88 km from Makhachkala (the capital of Dagestan) and 1,635 km from Moscow. Tselmes is the nearest rural locality.
