= Tsada, Republic of Dagestan =

Tsada Цада
- Selo
- Location within Republic of Dagestan Location within Russia
- Coordinates: 42°34′N 46°42′E
- Country: Russia
- Region: Republic of Dagestan
- District: Khunzakhsky District
- Time zone: UTC+3:00

Tsada (Russian: Цада) is a rural locality (a selo) in Khunzakhsky District, Republic of Dagestan, Russia. Population: 431 (2021 census); 367 (2002 census); 384 (1989 Soviet census). There are 3 streets in this selo.

== Geography ==
It is located 3 km from Khunzakh (the district's administrative centre), 78 km from Makhachkala (capital of Dagestan) and 1,644 km from Moscow. Arani is the nearest rural locality.
