= Tsalkita =

Tsalkita Цалкита
- Selo
- Location within Republic of Dagestan Location within Russia
- Coordinates: 42°37′N 46°34′E
- Country: Russia
- Region: Republic of Dagestan
- District: Khunzakhsky District
- Time zone: UTC+3:00

Tsalkita (Russian: Цалкита) is a rural locality (a selo) in Akhalchinsky Selsoviet, Khunzakhsky District, Republic of Dagestan, Russia. Population: 109 (2010 census); 113 (2002 census); 50 (1989 Soviet census). There is 1 street in this selo.

== Geography ==
It is located 14 km from Khunzakh (the district's administrative centre), 85 km from Makhachkala (capital of Dagestan) and 1,634 km from Moscow. Dzhalaturi is the nearest rural locality.
