= Ochlo, Republic of Dagestan =

Ochlo Очло
- Selo
- Location within Republic of Dagestan Location within Russia
- Coordinates: 42°38′N 46°38′E
- Country: Russia
- Region: Republic of Dagestan
- District: Khunzakhsky District
- Time zone: UTC+3:00

Ochlo (Russian: Очло) is a rural locality (a selo) and the administrative center of Ochlinsky Selsoviet, Khunzakhsky District, Republic of Dagestan, Russia. Population: 571 (2010 census); 507 (2002 census); 388 (1989 Soviet census). There are 10 streets in this selo.

== Geography ==
It is located 12 km from Khunzakh (the district's administrative centre), 79 km from Makhachkala (capital of Dagestan) and 1,634 km from Moscow. Mochokh is the nearest rural locality.
