= Oboda, Republic of Dagestan =

Oboda Обода
- Selo
- Location within Republic of Dagestan Location within Russia
- Coordinates: 42°34′N 46°40′E
- Country: Russia
- Region: Republic of Dagestan
- District: Khunzakhsky District
- Time zone: UTC+3:00

Oboda (Russian: Обода) is a rural locality (a selo) and the administrative center of Obodinsky Selsoviet, Khunzakhsky District, Republic of Dagestan, Russia. Population: 667 (2010 census); 759 (2002 census); 582 (1989 Soviet census). There are 22 streets in this selo.

== Geography ==
It is located 5 km from Khunzakh (the district's administrative centre), 81 km from Makhachkala (capital of Dagestan) and 1,642 km from Moscow. Ebuta is the nearest rural locality.
