= Amishta =

Amishta Амишта
- Selo
- Location within Republic of Dagestan Location within Russia
- Coordinates: 42°37′N 46°33′E
- Country: Russia
- Region: Republic of Dagestan
- District: Khunzakhsky District
- Time zone: UTC+3:00

Amishta (Russian: Амишта) is a rural locality (a selo) and the administrative center of Amishtinsky Selsoviet, Khunzakhsky District, Republic of Dagestan, Russia. Population: 126 (2010 census); 153 (2002 census); 158 (1989 Soviet census). There is 1 street in this selo.

== Geography ==
It is located 16 km from Khunzakh (the district's administrative centre), 86 km from Makhachkala (capital of Dagestan) and 1,632 km from Moscow. Dzhalaturi is the nearest rural locality.
