= Akhtini =

Akhtini Ахтини
- Selo
- Location within Republic of Dagestan Location within Russia
- Coordinates: 43°16′N 47°01′E
- Country: Russia
- Region: Republic of Dagestan
- District: Khunzakhsky District
- Time zone: UTC+3:00

Akhtini (Russian: Ахтини) is a rural locality (a selo) in Akhalchinsky Selsoviet, Khunzakhsky District, Republic of Dagestan, Russia. Population: 474 (2010 census); 411 (2002 census); 329 (1989 Soviet census).

== Geography ==
It is located 87 km from Khunzakh (the district's administrative centre), 51 km from Makhachkala (capital of Dagestan) and 1,582 km from Moscow. Kvami is the nearest rural locality.
