= Akhalchi =

Akhalchi Ахалчи
- Selo
- Location within Republic of Dagestan Location within Russia
- Coordinates: 42°35′N 46°37′E
- Country: Russia
- Region: Republic of Dagestan
- District: Khunzakhsky District
- Time zone: UTC+3:00

Akhalchi (Russian: Ахалчи) is a rural locality (a selo) and the administrative center of Akhalchinsky Selsoviet, Khunzakhsky District, Republic of Dagestan, Russia. Population: 734 (2010 census); 512 (2002 census); 394 (1989 Soviet census). There are 2 streets in this selo.

== Geography ==
It is located 9 km from Khunzakh (the district's administrative centre), 82 km from Makhachkala (capital of Dagestan) and 1,639 km from Moscow. Verkhniye Akhalchi is the nearest rural locality.
