= Tukita, Khunzakhsky District, Republic of Dagestan =

Tukita Тукита
- Selo
- Location within Republic of Dagestan Location within Russia
- Coordinates: 42°37′N 46°31′E
- Country: Russia
- Region: Republic of Dagestan
- District: Khunzakhsky District
- Time zone: UTC+3:00

Tukita (Russian: Тукита) is a rural locality (a selo) in Tlaylukhsky Selsoviet, Khunzakhsky District, Republic of Dagestan, Russia. Population: 167 (2010 census); 239 (2002 census); 114 (1989 Soviet census).

== Geography ==
It is located 18 km from Khunzakh (the district's administrative centre), 88 km from Makhachkala (capital of Dagestan) and 1,631 km from Moscow. Tlaylukh is the nearest rural locality.
