= Batlaich =

Batlaich Батлаич
- Selo
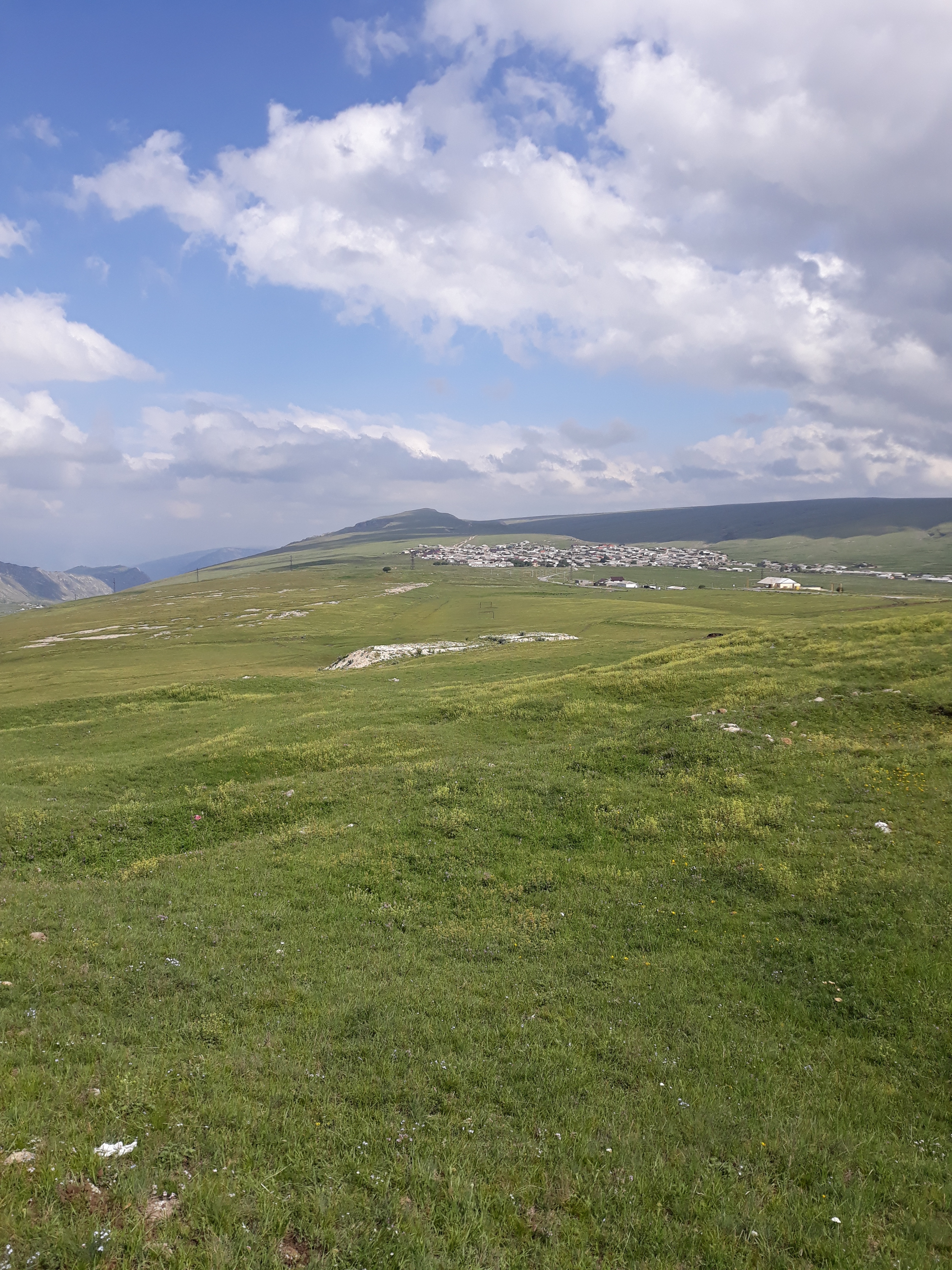

- Location within Republic of Dagestan Location within Russia
- Coordinates: 42°33′N 46°45′E
- Country: Russia
- Region: Republic of Dagestan
- District: Khunzakhsky District
- Time zone: UTC+3:00

Batlaich (Russian: Батлаич) is a rural locality (a selo) and the administrative center of Batlaichsky Selsoviet, Khunzakhsky District, Republic of Dagestan, Russia. Its population was 1,081 (2010 census); 1,074 (2002 census); 769 (1989 Soviet census).

There are 34 streets in this selo.

== Geography ==
Batlaich is located 4 km from Khunzakh (the district's administrative centre), 76 km from Makhachkala (capital of Dagestan) and 1,647 km from Moscow. Genichutl is the nearest rural locality.
