= Chondotl =

Chondotl Чондотль
- Selo
- Location within Republic of Dagestan Location within Russia
- Coordinates: 42°32′N 46°39′E
- Country: Russia
- Region: Republic of Dagestan
- District: Khunzakhsky District
- Time zone: UTC+3:00

Chondotl (Russian: Чондотль) is a rural locality (a selo) in Khunzakhsky Selsoviet, Khunzakhsky District, Republic of Dagestan, Russia. Population: 154 (2010 census); 193 (2002 census); 69 (1989 Soviet census). There are 3 streets in this selo.

== Geography ==
It is located 4 km from Khunzakh (the district's administrative centre), 83 km from Makhachkala (capital of Dagestan) and 1,645 km from Moscow. Baitl is the nearest rural locality.
