= Orkachi =

Orkachi Оркачи
- Selo
- Location within Republic of Dagestan Location within Russia
- Coordinates: 42°34′N 46°36′E
- Country: Russia
- Region: Republic of Dagestan
- District: Khunzakhsky District
- Time zone: UTC+3:00

Orkachi (Russian: Оркачи) is a rural locality (a selo) in Khunzakhsky District, Republic of Dagestan, Russia. Population: 407 (2021 census); 408 (2002 census); 219 (1989 Soviet census). There is 1 street in this selo.

== Geography ==
It is located 12 km from Khunzakh (the district's administrative centre), 69 km from Makhachkala (capital of Dagestan) and 1,645 km from Moscow. Novaya Butsra is the nearest rural locality.
