= Kakhikal =

Kakhikal Кахикал
- Selo
- Location within Republic of Dagestan Location within Russia
- Coordinates: 42°37′N 46°32′E
- Country: Russia
- Region: Republic of Dagestan
- District: Khunzakhsky District
- Time zone: UTC+3:00

Kakhikal (Russian: Кахикал) is a rural locality (a selo) in Uzdalrosinsky Selsoviet, Khunzakhsky District, Republic of Dagestan, Russia. Population: 339 (2010 census); 267 (2002 census); 208 (1989 Soviet census). There are 6 streets in this selo.

== Geography ==
It is located 15 km from Khunzakh (the district's administrative centre), 73 km from Makhachkala (capital of Dagestan) and 1,658 km from Moscow. Tagada is the nearest rural locality.
