= Matlas =

Matlas Матлас
- Selo
- Location within Republic of Dagestan Location within Russia
- Coordinates: 42°35′N 46°36′E
- Country: Russia
- Region: Republic of Dagestan
- District: Khunzakhsky District
- Time zone: UTC+3:00

Matlas (Russian: Матлас) is a rural locality (a selo) in Akhalchinsky Selsoviet, Khunzakhsky District, Republic of Dagestan, Russia. Population: 150 (2010 census); 154 (2002 census); 90 (1989 Soviet census). There is 1 street in this selo.

== Geography ==
It is located 10 km from Khunzakh (the district's administrative centre), 84 km from Makhachkala (capital of Dagestan) and 1,638 km from Moscow. Khimakoro is the nearest rural locality.
