= Ebuta =

Ebuta Эбута
- Selo
- Location within Republic of Dagestan Location within Russia
- Coordinates: 42°35′N 46°39′E
- Country: Russia
- Region: Republic of Dagestan
- District: Khunzakhsky District
- Time zone: UTC+3:00

Ebuta (Russian: Эбута) is a rural locality (a selo) and the administrative center of Tanusinsky Selsoviet, Khunzakhsky District, Republic of Dagestan, Russia. Population: 167 (2010 census); 185 (2002 census); 119 (1989 Soviet census). There are 6 streets in this selo.

== Geography ==
It is located 7 km from Khunzakh (the district's administrative centre), 80 km from Makhachkala (capital of Dagestan) and 1,640 km from Moscow. Gatsalukh is the nearest rural locality.
