= Kharikolo =

Kharikolo Хариколо
- Selo
- Location within Republic of Dagestan Location within Russia
- Coordinates: 42°32′N 46°48′E
- Country: Russia
- Region: Republic of Dagestan
- District: Khunzakhsky District
- Time zone: UTC+3:00

Kharikolo (Russian: Хариколо) is a rural locality (a selo) and the administrative center of Kharikolinsky Selsoviet, Khunzakhsky District, Republic of Dagestan, Russia. Population: 341 (2010 census); 335 (2002 census); 344 (1989 Soviet census). There are 12 streets in this selo.

== Geography ==
It is located 9 km from Khunzakh (the district's administrative centre), 74 km from Makhachkala (capital of Dagestan) and 1,650 km from Moscow. Khakh is the nearest rural locality.
