= Tumagari =

Tumagari Тумагари
- Selo
- Location within Republic of Dagestan Location within Russia
- Coordinates: 42°34′N 46°36′E
- Country: Russia
- Region: Republic of Dagestan
- District: Khunzakhsky District
- Time zone: UTC+3:00

Tumagari (Russian: Тумагари) is a rural locality (a selo) in Akhalchinsky Selsoviet, Khunzakhsky District, Republic of Dagestan, Russia. Population: 80 (2010 census); 61 (2002 census); 50 (1989 Soviet census). There is 1 street in this selo.

== Geography ==
It is located 9 km from Khunzakh (the district's administrative centre), 85 km from Makhachkala (capital of Dagestan) and 1,639 km from Moscow. Khimakoro is the nearest rural locality.
