= Samilakh =

Samilakh Самилах
- Selo
- Location within Republic of Dagestan Location within Russia
- Coordinates: 43°19′N 47°03′E
- Country: Russia
- Region: Republic of Dagestan
- District: Khunzakhsky District
- Time zone: UTC+3:00

Samilakh (Russian: Самилах) is a rural locality (a selo) and the administrative center of Ochlinsky Selsoviet, Khunzakhsky District, Republic of Dagestan, Russia. Population: 1,417 (2010 census); 1,085 (2002 census); 950 (1989 Soviet census).

== Geography ==
It is located 91 km from Khunzakh (the district's administrative centre), 52 km from Makhachkala (capital of Dagestan) and 1,580 km from Moscow. Arzhidada is the nearest rural locality.
