= Kvami =

Kvami Квами
- Selo
- Location within Republic of Dagestan Location within Russia
- Coordinates: 43°17′N 47°01′E
- Country: Russia
- Region: Republic of Dagestan
- District: Khunzakhsky District
- Time zone: UTC+3:00

Kvami (Russian: Квами) is a rural locality (a selo) in Obodinsky Selsoviet, Khunzakhsky District, Republic of Dagestan, Russia. Population: 56 (2010 census); 70 (2002 census); 39 (1989 Soviet census).

== Geography ==
It is located 87 km from Khunzakh (the district's administrative centre), 52 km from Makhachkala (capital of Dagestan) and 1,581 km from Moscow. Akhtini is the nearest rural locality.
