= Kharakhi =

Kharakhi Харахи
- Selo
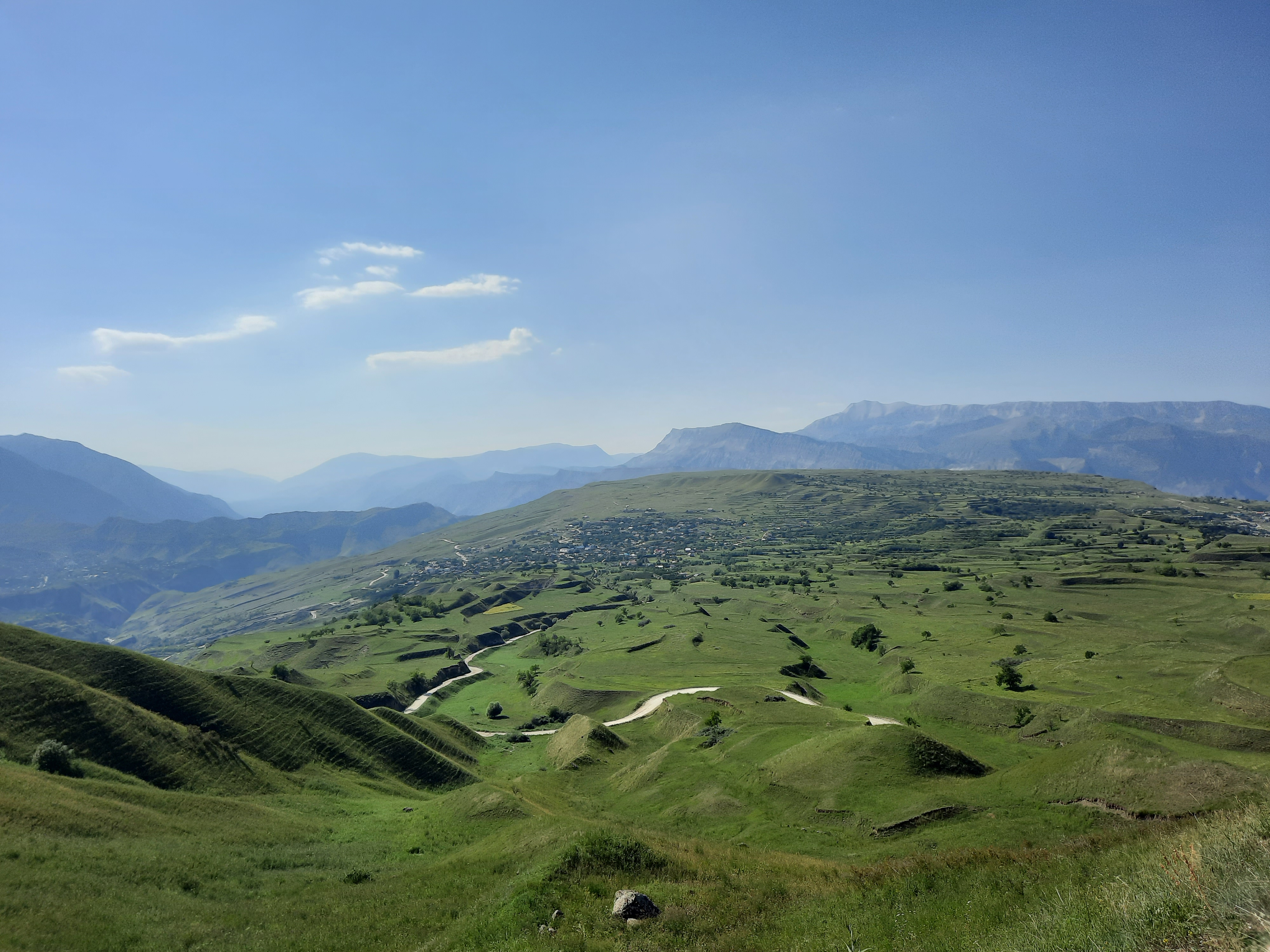
- In Russia

- Location within Republic of Dagestan Location within Russia
- Coordinates: 42°38′N 46°31′E
- Country: Russia
- Region: Republic of Dagestan
- District: Khunzakhsky District
- Time zone: UTC+3:00

Kharakhi (Russian: Харахи) is a rural locality (a selo) in Khunzakhsky District, Republic of Dagestan, Russia. Population: 1,260 (2021 census); 1,223 (2002 census); 1,072 (1989 Soviet census). There are 10 streets in this selo.

== Geography ==
It is located 19 km from Khunzakh (the district's administrative centre), 88 km from Makhachkala (capital of Dagestan) and 1,630 km from Moscow. Tukita is the nearest rural locality.
