= Khakh, Republic of Dagestan =

Khakh Ках
- Selo
- Location within Republic of Dagestan Location within Russia
- Coordinates: 42°33′N 46°47′E
- Country: Russia
- Region: Republic of Dagestan
- District: Khunzakhsky District
- Time zone: UTC+3:00

Khakh (Russian: Ках) is a rural locality (a selo) in Kharikolinsky Selsoviet, Khunzakhsky District, Republic of Dagestan, Russia. Population: 276 (2010 census); 220 (2002 census); 201 (1989 Soviet census). There are 12 streets in this selo.

== Geography ==
It is located 7 km from Khunzakh (the district's administrative centre), 74 km from Makhachkala (capital of Dagestan) and 1,649 km from Moscow. Kharikolo is the nearest rural locality.
