= Tselmes =

Tselmes Цельмес
- Selo
- Location within Republic of Dagestan Location within Russia
- Coordinates: 42°37′N 46°32′E
- Country: Russia
- Region: Republic of Dagestan
- District: Khunzakhsky District
- Time zone: UTC+3:00

Tselmes (Russian: Цельмес) is a rural locality (a selo) in Tlaylukhsky Selsoviet, Khunzakhsky District, Republic of Dagestan, Russia. Population: 377 (2010 census); 321 (2002 census); 263 (1989 Soviet census). There are 3 streets in this selo.

== Geography ==
It is located 17 km from Khunzakh (the district's administrative centre), 87 km from Makhachkala (capital of Dagestan) and 1,632 km from Moscow. Tlaylukh is the nearest rural locality.
