= Mushuli =

Mushuli Мушули
- Selo
- Location within Republic of Dagestan Location within Russia
- Coordinates: 42°37′N 46°36′E
- Country: Russia
- Region: Republic of Dagestan
- District: Khunzakhsky District
- Time zone: UTC+3:00

Mushuli (Russian: Мушули) is a rural locality (a selo) in Khunzakhsky District, Republic of Dagestan, Russia. It has a population of 467 (2021 census); 553 (2002 census); 401 (1989 Soviet census). There are 7 streets in this selo.

== Geography ==
It is located 20 km from Khunzakh (the district's administrative centre), 90 km from Makhachkala (capital of Dagestan) and 1,630 km from Moscow. Amushi Bolshoye is the nearest rural locality.
