= Genichutl =

Genichutl Геничутль
- Selo
- Location within Republic of Dagestan Location within Russia
- Coordinates: 42°33′N 46°44′E
- Country: Russia
- Region: Republic of Dagestan
- District: Khunzakhsky District
- Time zone: UTC+3:00

Genichutl (Russian: Геничутль) is a rural locality (a selo) in Khunzakhsky Selsoviet, Khunzakhsky District, Republic of Dagestan, Russia. Population: 315 (2010 census); 282 (2002 census); 181 (1989 Soviet census). There are 3 streets in this selo.

== Geography ==
It is located 4 km from Khunzakh (the district's administrative centre), 77 km from Makhachkala (capital of Dagestan) and 1,646 km from Moscow. Batlaich is the nearest rural locality.
