= Baitl =

Baitl Баитль
- Selo
- Location within Republic of Dagestan Location within Russia
- Coordinates: 42°32′N 46°40′E
- Country: Russia
- Region: Republic of Dagestan
- District: Khunzakhsky District
- Time zone: UTC+3:00

Baitl (Russian: Баитль) is a rural locality (a selo) in Khunzakhsky Selsoviet, Khunzakhsky District, Republic of Dagestan, Russia. Population: 203 (2010 census); 178 (2002 census); 105 (1989 Soviet census). There are 4 streets in this selo.

== Geography ==
It is located 2 km from Khunzakh (the district's administrative centre), 82 km from Makhachkala (capital of Dagestan) and 1,645 km from Moscow. Chondotl is the nearest rural locality.
