= Tagada, Republic of Dagestan =

Tagada Тагада
- Selo
- Location within Republic of Dagestan Location within Russia
- Coordinates: 42°29′N 46°52′E
- Country: Russia
- Region: Republic of Dagestan
- District: Khunzakhsky District
- Time zone: UTC+3:00

Tagada (Russian: Тагада) is a rural locality (a selo) in Uzdalrosinsky Selsoviet, Khunzakhsky District, Republic of Dagestan, Russia. Population: 497 (2010 census); 369 (2002 census); 222 (1989 Soviet census). There are 8 streets in this selo.

== Geography ==
It is located 14 km from Khunzakh (the district's administrative centre), 74 km from Makhachkala (capital of Dagestan) and 1,658 km from Moscow. Kakhikal is the nearest rural locality.
