= Fazu Aliyeva =

Russian poet (born 1932)

- Фазу Алиева
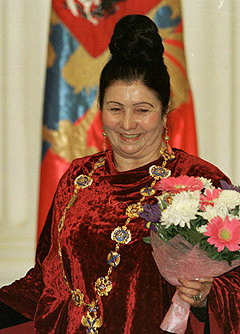
- Alijeva in 2002
- Born: 5 December 1932; Khunzakhsky District, Dagestan ASSR, Russian SFSR, Soviet Union
- Died: 1 January 2016 (aged 83); Makhachkala, Dagestan, Russia
- Occupation: Poet
- Awards: Order of St. Andrew (2002); Order "For Merit to the Fatherland" (3rd class 2015); Order "For Merit to the Fatherland" (4th class 1989); Order of Friendship of Peoples (1994); Order of Friendship of Peoples (1983)

Fazu Aliyeva (5 December 1932 – 1 January 2016) was an Avar-speaking Soviet-born Russian poet, novelist and journalist. She played a significant role in the development of Avar in Russian literature. She was also a human rights activist.

== Overview ==
Aliyeva was born in the Khunzakhsky District of Dagestan.

From 1954-1955, Fazu Aliyeva studied at Dagestan State Pedagogical University.

In 1961 she graduated from the Maxim Gorky Literature Institute.

She was a member of the Union of Soviet Writers as well as the Civic Chamber of the Russian Federation (until 2006).

Aliyeva was awarded two Orders of the "Badge of Honor", two Orders of Friendship of Peoples and the Order of St. Andrew in 2002. She was awarded the Gold Medal of the Soviet Peace Fund, the Jubilee Medal of the World Peace Council, and honorary awards in several foreign countries.

Aliyeva died in Makhachkala, Dagestan, Russia, on 1 January 2016, from heart failure at the age of 83.
