= Dzhalaturi =

Dzhalaturi Джалатури
- Selo
- Location within Republic of Dagestan Location within Russia
- Coordinates: 42°37′N 46°34′E
- Country: Russia
- Region: Republic of Dagestan
- District: Khunzakhsky District
- Time zone: UTC+3:00

Dzhalaturi (Russian: Джалатури) is a rural locality (a selo) in Amishtinsky Selsoviet, Khunzakhsky District, Republic of Dagestan, Russia. Population: 81 (2010 census); 105 (2002 census); 79 (1989 Soviet census). There is 1 street in this selo.

== Geography ==
It is located 15 km from Khunzakh (the district's administrative centre), 85 km from Makhachkala (capital of Dagestan) and 1,632 km from Moscow. Amishta is the nearest rural locality.
