= Mochokh =

Mochokh Мочох
- Selo
- Location within Republic of Dagestan Location within Russia
- Coordinates: 42°37′N 46°36′E
- Country: Russia
- Region: Republic of Dagestan
- District: Khunzakhsky District
- Time zone: UTC+3:00

Mochokh (Russian: Мочох) is a rural locality (a selo) in Khunzakhsky District, Republic of Dagestan, Russia. Population: 458 (2021 census); 475 (2002 census); 306 (1989 Soviet census). There are 6 streets in this selo.

== Geography ==
It is located 13 km from Khunzakh (the district's administrative centre), 81 km from Makhachkala (capital of Dagestan) and 1,634 km from Moscow. Ochlo is the nearest rural locality.
