= Sevil Novruzova =

Lawyer from Dagestan

- Севиль Новрузова
- Born: 1977 (age 48–49); Derbent, Dagestan
- Occupation: Lawyer
- Known for: Director of the 'Centre for Reconciliation and Harmony' (Derbent)

Sevil Novruzova (Russian: Севиль Новрузова; born c. 1977) is a lawyer and activist from Dagestan, Russia. In 2019 she was a member of Dagestan's anti-terrorism council and the Director of the 'Centre for Reconciliation and Harmony'.

== Biography ==
Novruzova was born circa 1977 in Derbent. She is a lawyer and an activist, helping to retrieve people from communities in Dagestan who have tried to join the Islamic State. She has helped to return at least 120 people from the caliphate. She began her work in repatriation as a volunteer, after her brother, Emille, joined a local Islamic insurgent group. In 2008 he was killed by Russian security forces within months of joining the insurgents.

In 2019 she was a member of Dagestan's anti-terrorism council and the Director of the 'Centre for Reconciliation and Harmony' in Derbent. This work involves negotiation between the families of insurgents and the Russian government. In 2011 she was head of the Derbent Municipal Commission for Adaptation, working to reintegrate former insurgents to society. She has also worked to bring the children of insurgents back to Russia.
