= Gatsalukh =

Gatsalukh Гацалух
- Selo
- Location within Republic of Dagestan Location within Russia
- Coordinates: 42°35′N 46°38′E
- Country: Russia
- Region: Republic of Dagestan
- District: Khunzakhsky District
- Time zone: UTC+3:00

Gatsalukh (Russian: Гацалух) is a rural locality (a selo) in Khunzakhsky District, Republic of Dagestan, Russia. Population: 461 (2021 census); 466 (2002 census); 314 (1989 Soviet census). There are 2 streets in this selo.

== Geography ==
It is located 7 km from Khunzakh (the district's administrative centre), 81 km from Makhachkala (capital of Dagestan) and 1,640 km from Moscow. Verkhniye Akhalchi is the nearest rural locality.
