= Tlaylukh =

Tlaylukh Тлайлух
- Selo
- Location within Republic of Dagestan Location within Russia
- Coordinates: 42°37′N 46°31′E
- Country: Russia
- Region: Republic of Dagestan
- District: Khunzakhsky District
- Time zone: UTC+3:00

Tlaylukh (Russian: Тлайлух) is a rural locality (a selo) and the administrative center of Tlaylukhsky Selsoviet, Khunzakhsky District, Republic of Dagestan, Russia. Population: 375 (2010 census); 377 (2002 census); 252 (1989 Soviet census). There are 8 streets in this selo.

== Geography ==
It is located 17 km from Khunzakh (the district's administrative centre), 88 km from Makhachkala (capital of Dagestan) and 1,632 km from Moscow. Tukita is the nearest rural locality.
