= Alla Dzhalilova =

Russian ballerina (1908–1992)

- Born: Alla Abdulgaevna (Gaevna) Dzhalilova; 21 November 1908; Tbilisi, Georgia
- Died: 12 April 1992 (aged 83); Moscow, Russia
- Occupation: Ballerina
- Career
- Former groups: Bolshoi Theatre

Alla Abdulgaevna (Gaevna) Dzhalilova (5 (21) November 1908 – 12 April 1992) was a Soviet artist and teacher, soloist of the Bolschoi Theatre ballet (1927-1951), the first Dagestani ballerina. She is an Honored Artist of the Dagestan Autonomous Soviet Socialist Republic (1951).

== Life and career ==
Alla Dzhalilova was born on 21 November 1908 in Tbilisi. In 1920, she entered the Moscow Choreographic School. In 1927, after graduating from the Moscow Choreographic School, she was admitted to the ballet group of the Bolshoi Theater of the USSR. The same year Dzhalilova performed for the first time in The Demon by Anton Rubinstein where she danced lezginka – the dance of the queen Tamara. The best roles performed by Dzhalilova were Mercedes in Don Quixote, Aya in La Bayadere, Tsaga in Polovtsian Dances (Prince Igor), and a snake dancer in Cinderella. She also performed Gypsy ("Mermaid" and "Traviata"), Spanish and Oriental ("Swan Lake" and "Nutcracker"), Hungarian ("Raymonda"), Hindu ("Lakme") and other national dances.

Since 1933, she taught at the Bolshoi Ballet School.

During the World War II, Dzhalilova, along with other artists of the Bolshoi Theater, visited the warring units, at the front and in the rear, where they gave hundreds of concerts.

In 1951, Dzhalilova was awarded the Order of the Badge of Honor and the title of Honored Artist of the Dagestan Autonomous Soviet Socialist Republic. She remained the soloist of Bolshoi Theater until 1951. After leaving the stage of the Bolshoi Theater in 1951, Alla Dzhalilova taught folk-character dance at the Moscow Choreographic School, and Boris Shchukin Theater Institute. She taught dance students-actors until 1974. With her direct participation, several groups of artistic youth were prepared for Dagestan and the republics of the North Caucasus.

Alla Dzhalilova died on 12 April 1992 in Moscow and was buried at the Muslim cemetery in Domodedovo. In 2015, a memorial evening dedicated to Dzhalilova was held at the Moscow House of Nationalities. The name of Dzhalilova was included in the list of fifteen Dagestani names of the 20th century, who made the most significant contribution to the development of the republic. A music school in the Akhty village is named after her.

== Theater works ==
- Mercedes - "Don Quixote"
- Aya - "La Bayadere"
- Tsaga - "Polovtsian Dances" ("Prince Igor"),
- Snake Dancer - "Cinderella"
- Spanish dance - "Swan Lake",
- Hungarian dance - "Raymonda",
- Lezginka - opera "Demon".

== Awards ==
- Order of the Badge of Honor (27 May 1951)
