= Mushail Mushailov =

Russian painter

Mushail Khanukhovich Mushailov Мушаил Ханухович Мушаилов
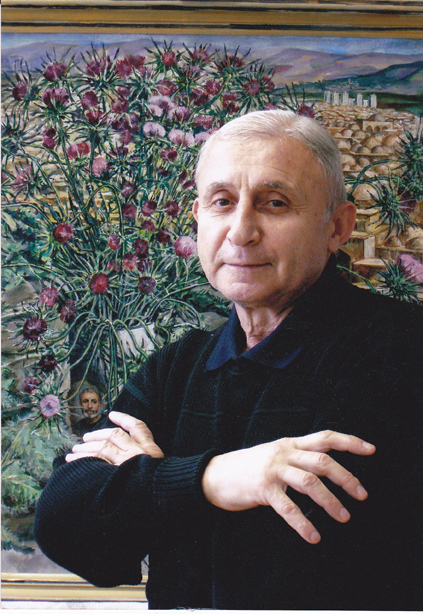
- Mushail Mushailov next to his painting "The Greater Burdock". Moscow. 2006.
- Born: July 2, 1941; Derbent, Dagestan USSR, Russia
- Died: January 2, 2007 (aged 65); Moscow, Russia; Buried in Yavne, Israel
- Known for: painting
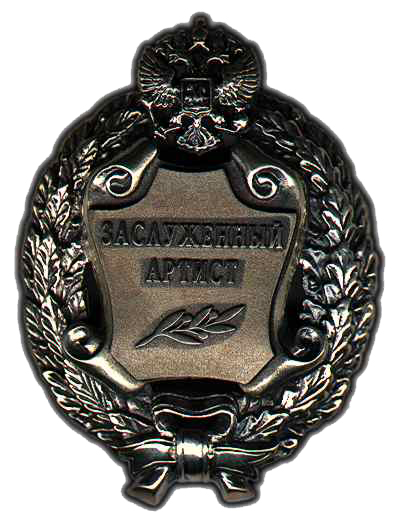
- Awards

Mushail Mushailov (Russian: Мушаил Ханухович Мушаилов, Hebrew: מושאיל מושאילוב; born July 2, 1941 — January 2, 2007) was a Soviet/Russian artist and teacher of Mountain Jewish descent. He was a member of the USSR Union of Artists and Israel. He was also a laureate of the State Prize of the USSR.

== Biography ==
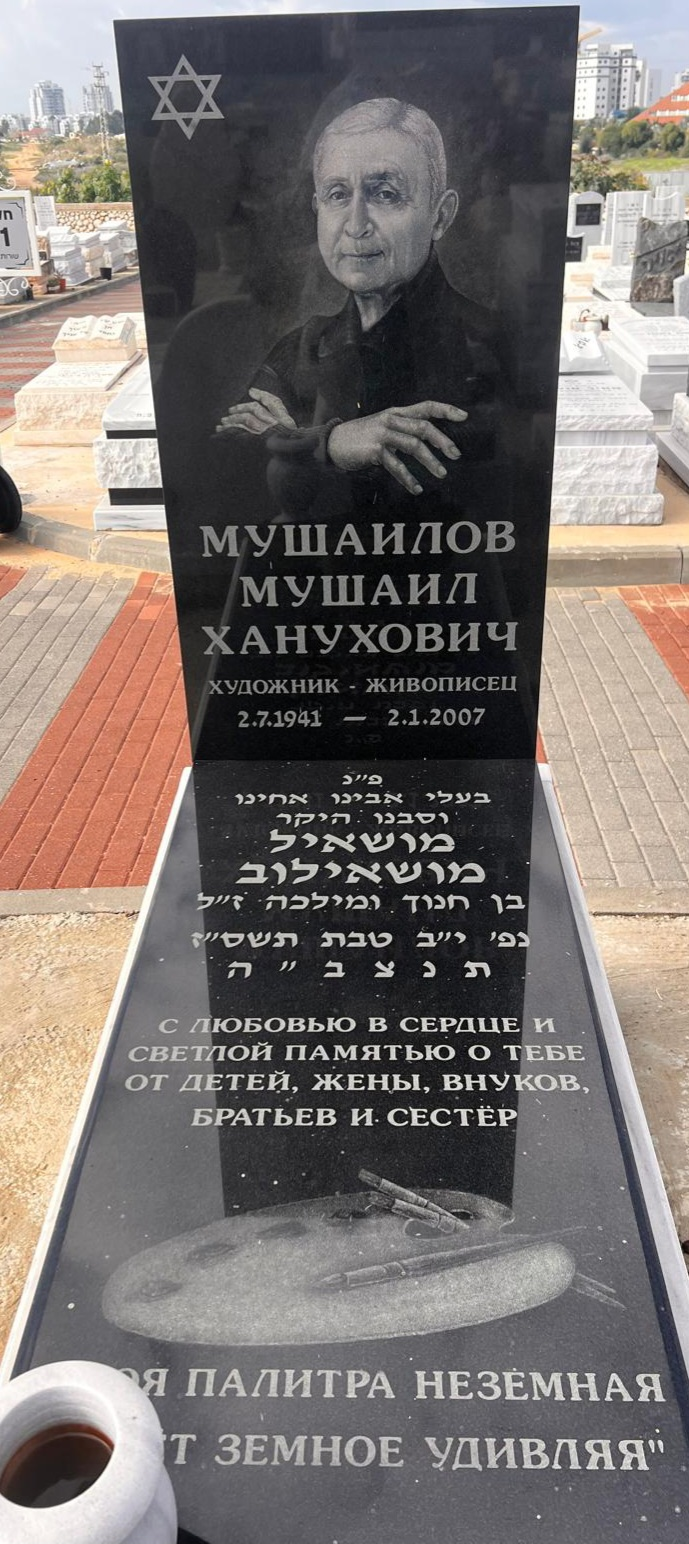
Grave of Mushail Mushailov. Yavne, Israel

Mushailov was born in Derbent, Dagestan USSR. In 1967 he graduated from the Moscow State Academic Art College of the Memory of 1905 and in 1973 from V. Surikov Moscow State Academy Art Institute.

For many years Mushailov taught art at the Makhachkala Pedagogical Institute at the Department of Fine Arts and was the executive secretary of the Artists' Union of Dagestan. In 1994 Mushail Mushailov with his family immigrated to Israel. There he continued to work, taking part in various exhibitions; he painted pictures associated with Jewish themes.

After eight years, in 2002, the artist left Israel and returned to Moscow, Russia. He taught drawing, painting and composition at the Moscow State Academic Art College of the Memory of 1905 and in the V. Surikov Moscow State Academy Art Institute.

Serious illness crippled the health of the artist, and in January 2007, Mushail Mushailov, died. Before his death, Mushailov asked his daughters to be buried in Israel. His daughters fulfilled his request. The artist is buried in the cemetery in the town of Yavne, Israel.

== Artwork ==
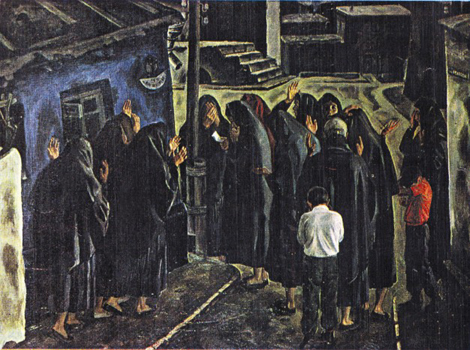
"Mothers’ Black Shawls". Oil on canvas. 1,20 x 1,60m. 1978.

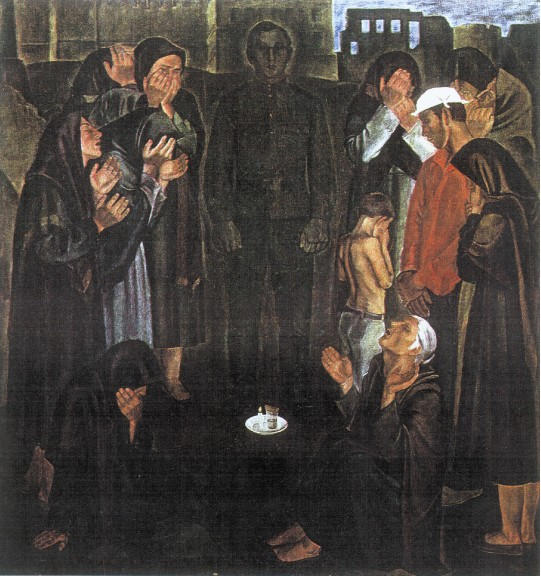
"Ballad of a Soldier - Memories". Oil on canvas. 1,89 x 1,98m. 1975.

Paintings "Ballad of a Soldier - Memories" and "Mothers’ Black Shawls", were dedicated to the theme of World War II. Numbers of his works are in Russia, foreign museums and in private collections in Russia, Israel and Canada.

During the artist’s lifetime and posthumously there were written articles about Mushailov’s art.

The author of the book "Art of the Soviet Dagestan" wrote:

"…60th — it was a flourishing time for young artists, who debuted with serious works, such as Musha Mushailov…"

Another article "Big Love to the Great Art" wrote:

"…a master of paintings as M. Mushailov, started a while ago to develop a new unexpected approach in his artworks, along with academism his art shows mysterious symbolism!"

== Awards ==
- Honored Artist of the Russian Federation.
- Honored Artist of Dagestan.
- State Prize of the Republic of Dagestan.

== Gallery ==
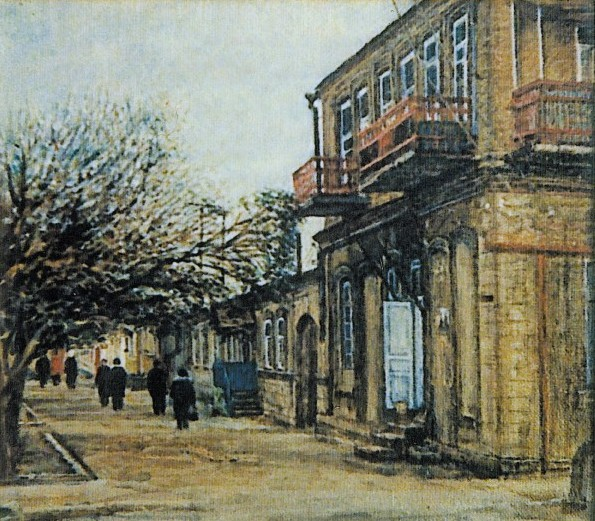
Street in the city of Derbent (1994)

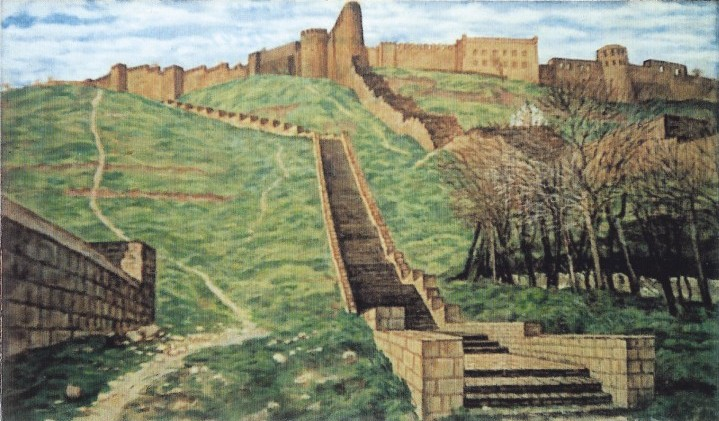
The Derbent fortress "Naryn-Kala" (1994)

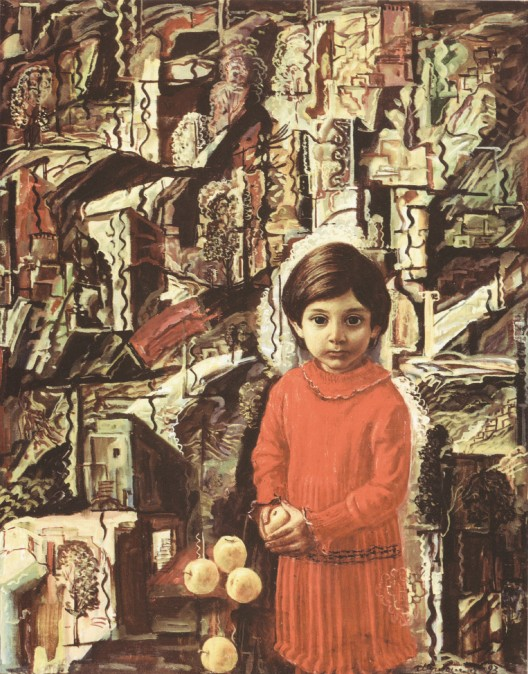
The Girl with Apple – Portret of Lyana, a youngest daughter (1994)

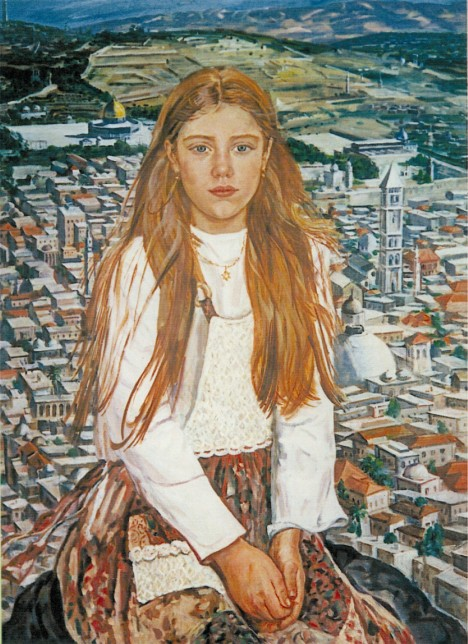
Yuliya – Portrait on the background of Jerusalem (1994)

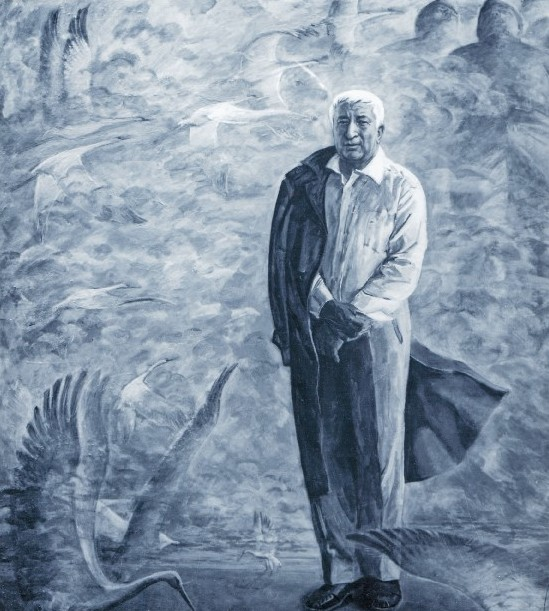
The Cranes – Portret of Dagestan poet Rasul Gamzatov (1998)

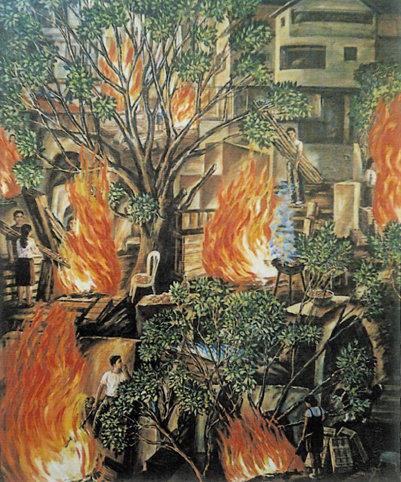
Holiday Lag BaOmer (1999)

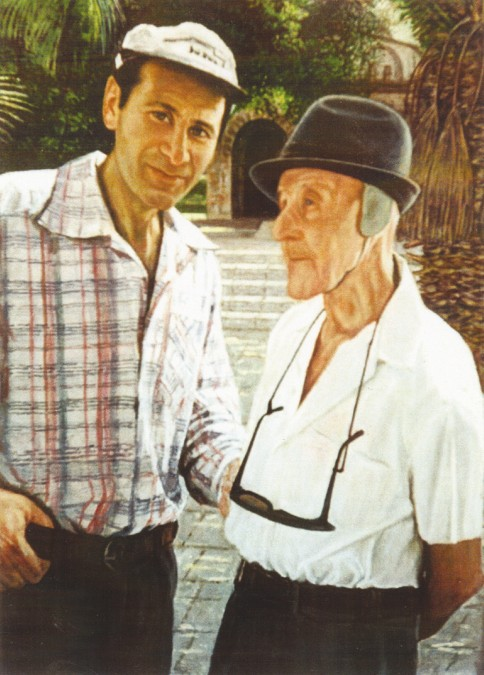
Oleg Fetliher and Yitzhak Blanshteyn (1999)

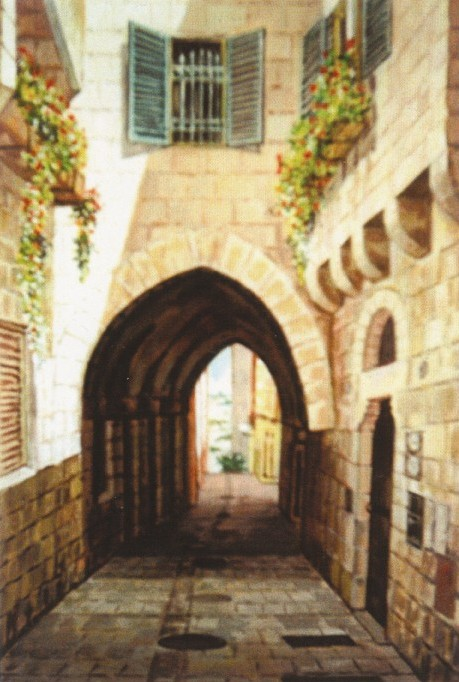
The landscape of Tel Aviv - "Jaffa" (1999)

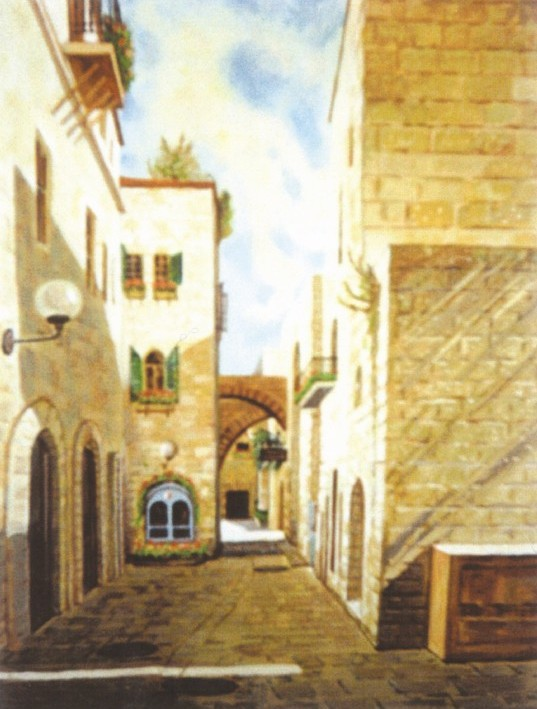
The Road Procession in Jerusalem – I (2000)

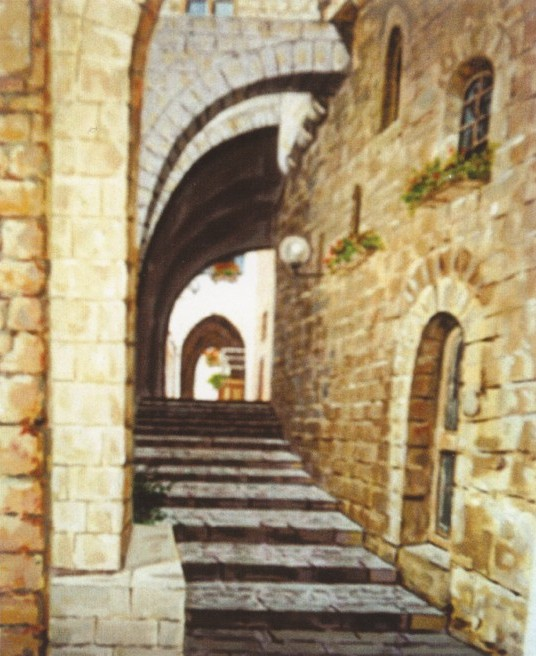
The Road Procession in Jerusalem – II (2000)

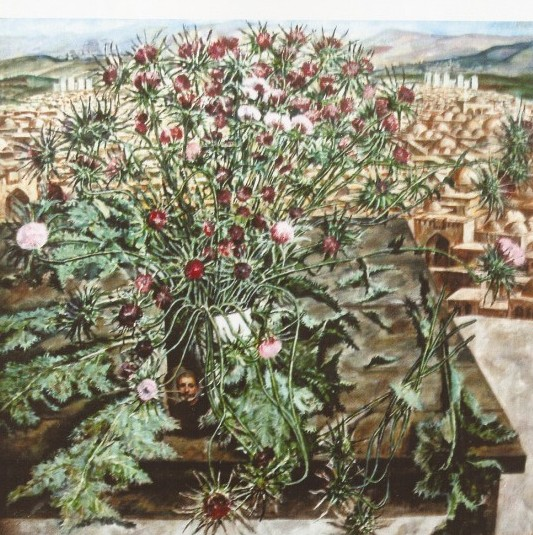
The Greater Burdock (2005)

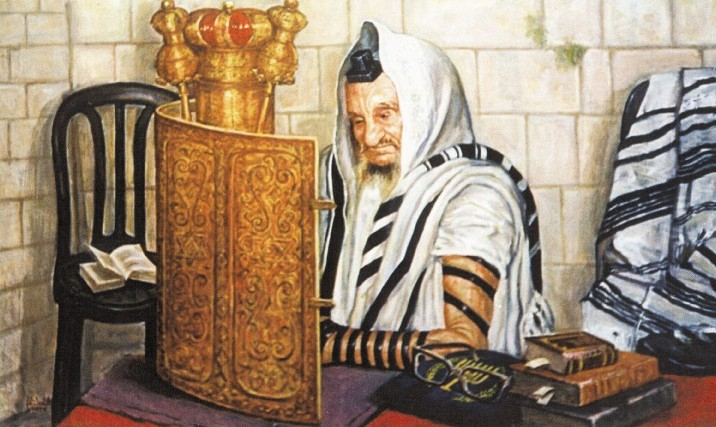
Holly Baba Sali
