= Arani, Republic of Dagestan =

Arani Арани
- Selo
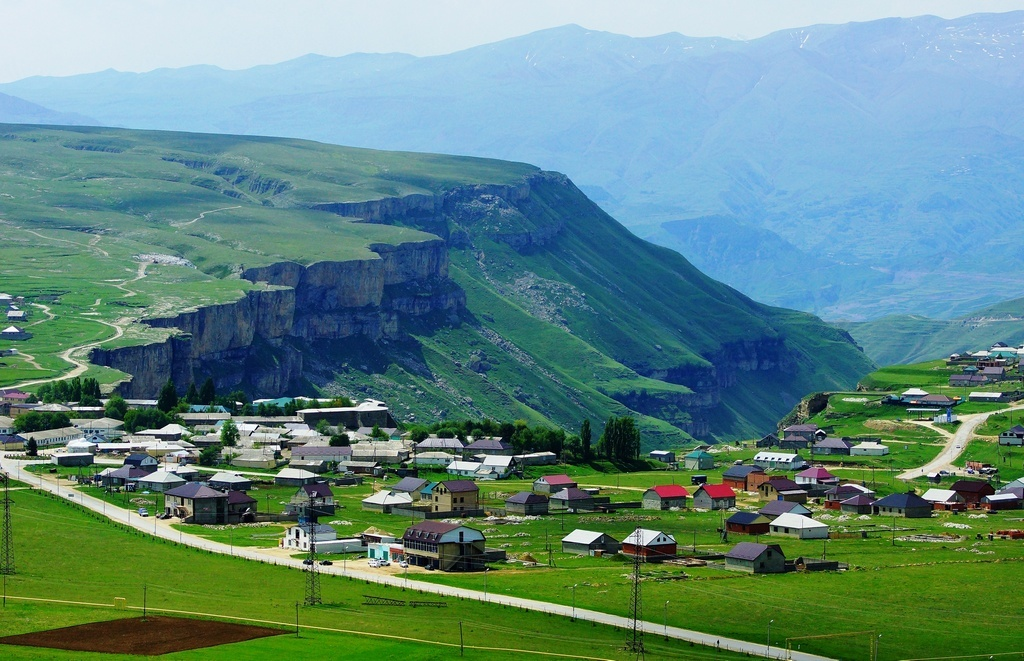
- Arani. Khunzakh district

- Location within Republic of Dagestan Location within Russia
- Coordinates: 42°33′N 46°43′E
- Country: Russia
- Region: Republic of Dagestan
- District: Khunzakhsky District
- Time zone: UTC+3:00

Arani (Russian: Арани) is a rural locality (a selo) in Khunzakhsky Selsoviet, Khunzakhsky District, Republic of Dagestan, Russia. Population: 674 (2010 census); 594 (2002 census); 395 (1989 Soviet census). There are 14 streets in this selo.

== Geography ==
It is located 2 km from Khunzakh (the district's administrative centre), 78 km from Makhachkala (capital of Dagestan) and 1,646 km from Moscow. Tsada is the nearest rural locality.
