= Sergei Dementyev =

Russian footballer

Personal information
- Full name: Sergei Vladimirovich Dementyev
- Date of birth: 25 June 1971 (age 55)
- Place of birth: Makhachkala, Soviet Union
- Height: 1.79 m (5 ft 10 1/2 in)
- Position: Midfielder

Youth career
- RSDYuSShOR-2 Makhachkala

Senior career*
Years	Team	Apps	(Gls)
1989–1991	FC Dynamo Makhachkala	75	(13)
1992	FC SKA Rostov-on-Don	38	(4)
1993–1995	FC Rostselmash Rostov-on-Don	52	(3)
1993	→ FC Rostselmash-2 Rostov-on-Don (loan)	5	(0)
1995	FC Torpedo Taganrog	5	(0)
1996–1998	FC Torpedo Arzamas	81	(5)
1999–2000	FC Tyumen	57	(8)
2001	FC KAMAZ Naberezhnye Chelny	6	(1)
2001	FC Kuzbass-Dynamo Kemerovo	13	(2)
2002	FC Progress Kamensk-Shakhtinsky (amateur)		
2002	FC Bataysk (amateur)		
2003	FC Mashuk-KMV Pyatigorsk	36	(5)
2004	FC Bataysk (amateur)		
2004–2005	FC Gazovik Orenburg	35	(1)
2005	FC Nara-Desna Naro-Fominsk	8	(0)
2006–2009	FC Dongazdobycha Sulin		
2010	FC Dongazdobycha-2 Sulin		
- * Club domestic league appearances and goals

Sergei Vladimirovich Dementyev (Russian: Сергей Владимирович Дементьев; born 25 June 1971) is a former Russian football player.
