= Rustam Khalimbekov =

Russian footballer

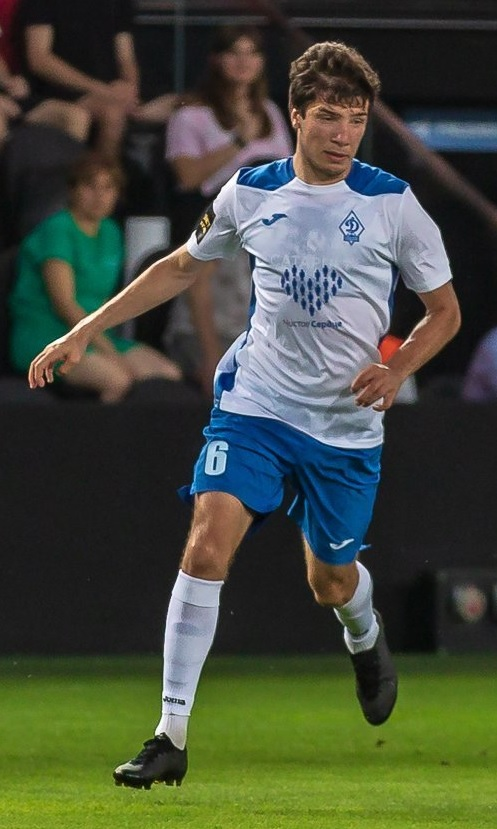
- Khalimbekov with Dynamo Makhachkala in 2022

Personal information
- Full name: Rustam Arslanovich Khalimbekov
- Date of birth: 11 July 1996 (age 30)
- Place of birth: Makhachkala, Russia
- Height: 1.82 m (6 ft 0 in)
- Positions: Defender; midfielder

Senior career*
Years	Team	Apps	(Gls)
2015	FC Sokol Moscow (amateur)		
2015–2017	FC Legion Dynamo Makhachkala	28	(0)
2017–2018	FC Anzhi Makhachkala	1	(0)
2017–2018	→ FC Anzhi-2 Makhachkala	23	(0)
2018–2019	FC Angusht Nazran	17	(0)
2019	FC Legion Dynamo Makhachkala	11	(0)
2020–2023	FC Dynamo Makhachkala	77	(5)
2023–2024	FC Forte Taganrog	17	(0)
2024	FC SKA-Khabarovsk	3	(0)
2024	→ FC SKA-Khabarovsk-2	2	(1)
2025	FC Merani Martvili	1	(0)
2025	FC Pobeda Khasavyurt	3	(0)
- * Club domestic league appearances and goals as of 22 November 2025

Rustam Arslanovich Khalimbekov (Russian: Рустам Арсланович Халимбеков; born 11 July 1996) is a Russian football player.

== Club career ==
He made his debut in the Russian Professional Football League for FC Legion Dynamo Makhachkala on 29 August 2016 in a game against FC Krasnodar-2.

He made his debut for the main squad of FC Anzhi Makhachkala on 20 September 2017 in a Russian Cup game against FC Luch-Energiya Vladivostok.

== Personal life ==
His father Arslan Khalimbekov is a football coach and a former player.
