= Arslan Khalimbekov =

Russian footballer and manager

Personal information
- Full name: Arslan Sharaputdinovich Khalimbekov
- Date of birth: 21 August 1967 (age 59)
- Place of birth: Makhachkala, Russian SFSR
- Position: Midfielder

Senior career*
Years	Team	Apps	(Gls)
1985	FC Dynamo Makhachkala	29	(1)
1989–1990	FC Dynamo Makhachkala	70	(7)
1991–1997	FC Anzhi Makhachkala	52	(13)
1991–1997	→ FC Anzhi-2 Makhachkala (loans)	102	(10)

Managerial career
- 2001–2006: FC Anzhi Makhachkala (assistant)
- 2002: FC Anzhi Makhachkala (reserves)
- 2007: FC Anzhi-Bekenez Makhachkala
- 2009: FC Angusht Nazran (conditioning coach)
- 2010-2012: FC Anzhi Makhachkala (scout)
- 2012–2013: FC Volga Nizhny Novgorod (assistant)
- 2013: FC Krylia Sovetov Samara (assistant)
- 2013–2014: FC Anzhi Makhachkala (assistant)
- 2016: FC Angusht Nazran
- 2016–2018: FC Amkar Perm (assistant)
- 2018–2019: FC Angusht Nazran
- 2019: FC SKA-Khabarovsk (assistant)
- 2019–2020: FC Ufa (assistant)
- 2021: FC Makhachkala
- 2021–2022: FC Shakhter Karagandy (assistant)
- 2022: Kazakhstan national football team (assistant)
- 2022–2023: FC Ufa
- 2023: FC Legion Makhachkala (assistant)
- 2024: FC Tekstilshchik Ivanovo (assistant)
- 2024–2026: FC Pobeda Khasavyurt
- * Club domestic league appearances and goals

Arslan Sharaputdinovich Khalimbekov (Russian: Арслан Шарапутдинович Халимбеков; born 21 August 1967) is a Russian football manager and a former player.

== Personal life ==
His son Rustam Khalimbekov is a professional football player.
