= Khunzakhsky District =

Khunzakhsky District Хунзахский район (Russian)
- District

Other transcription(s)
  - Avar: Хунзахъ мухъ
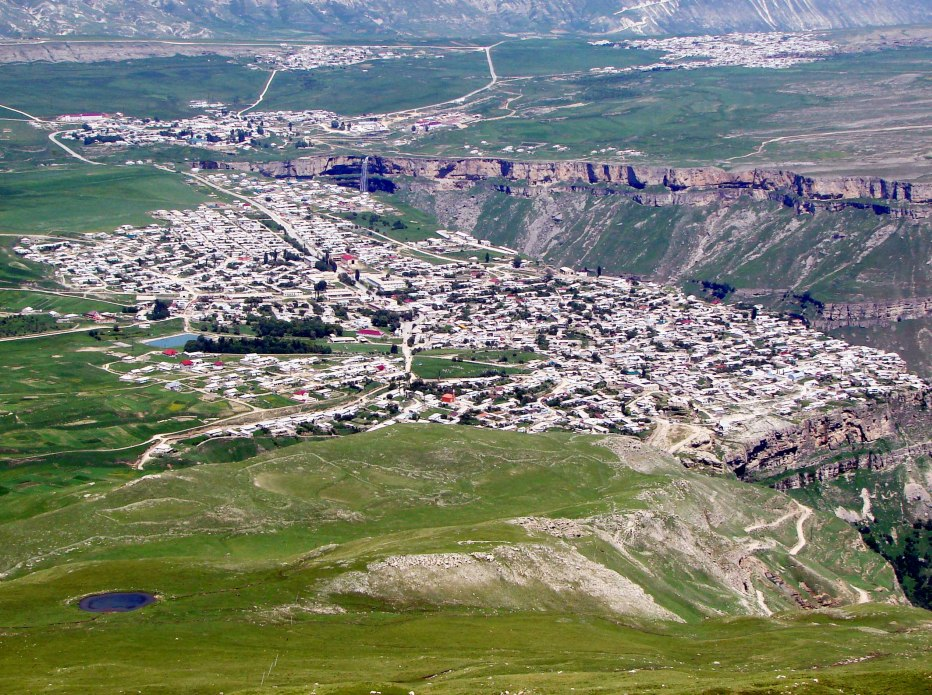
- The selo of Khunzakh, the administrative center of Khunzakhsky District

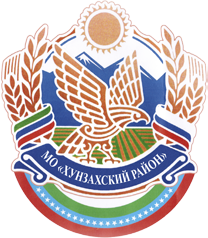
- Coat of arms
- Location of Khunzakhsky District in the Republic of Dagestan
- Coordinates: 42°33′N 46°45′E
- Country: Russia
- Federal subject: Republic of Dagestan
- Established: 1929
- Administrative center: Khunzakh

Area
  - Total: 551.91 km^{2} (213.09 sq mi)

Population (2010 Census)
  - Total: 31,691
  - Density: 57.421/km^{2} (148.72/sq mi)
  - Urban: 0%
  - Rural: 100%

Administrative structure
  - Administrative divisions: 15 Selsoviets
  - Inhabited localities: 59 rural localities

Municipal structure
  - Municipally incorporated as: Khunzakhsky Municipal District
  - Municipal divisions: 0 urban settlements, 24 rural settlements
- Time zone: UTC+3 (MSK)
- OKTMO ID: 82656000
- Website: http://khunzakh.ru

Population of Khunzakhsky District
- 2010 Census: 31,691
- 2002 Census: 30,203
- 1989 Census: 21,824
- 1979 Census: 21,332

Khunzakhsky District (Russian: Хунзахский райо́н; Avar: Хунзахъ мухъ) is an administrative and municipal district (raion), one of the forty-one in the Republic of Dagestan, Russia. It is located in the western central part of the republic. The area of the district is 551.91 square kilometers (213.09 sq mi). Its administrative center is the rural locality (a selo) of Khunzakh. As of the 2010 Census, the total population of the district was 31,691, with the population of Khunzakh accounting for 13.4% of that number.

== Administrative and municipal status ==
Within the framework of administrative divisions, Khunzakhsky District is one of the forty-one in the Republic of Dagestan. The district is divided into fifteen selsoviets which comprise fifty-nine rural localities. As a municipal division, the district is incorporated as Khunzakhsky Municipal District. Its fifteen selsoviets are incorporated as twenty-four rural settlements within the municipal district. The selo of Khunzakh serves as the administrative center of both the administrative and municipal district.
