= Muhammad-nutsal IV =

Nutsal of Avars
- Predecessor: Mahmud Khan I
- Successor: Umma Khan V
- Born: 1730; Khunzakh
- Died: 1774 (aged 43–44)
- Wives: Bahu (Paru), daughter of Khan-Muhammad of Kaitag; Tinatina; Maryam; Bita
- Issue: sons: Umma Khan V, Gebek (Ekber Khan), Surkhay daughters: Histaman, Bakhtika (Bartikhoy), Mesedu (Mezeda), Sultanzada (Sultansad), Shamay, Aymisi
- Father: Umma Khan IV
- Religion: Islam

Muhammad-nutsal IV the Brave also known as Nursal-bey or Mersel-khan (Avar: Мухӏаммад-нуцал, 1730–1774) was an Avar nutsal (ruler), who ruled from 1735 to 1774.

== Biography ==
=== Early years ===
He was born in 1730 or 1731 in Khunzakh village in the family of Umma Khan IV. In 1735, his father was mortally wounded in a campaign against the shamkhal of Tarki and after some time died from his wounds when he was 5 years old. Due to the infancy of the children of the previous ruler Nutsal Khan II, who ruled until 1744 became the khan.

Shapi Kaziev describes how during the Nader Shah's Dagestan campaign, the people of Khunzakh were led by Muhammad-nutsal and together they defeated the 20.000-strong Shah’s detachment in the Aimakin Gorge, after which nutsal went to Andalal and finally expelled the Persians from Avar lands.

=== War with Georgia ===
In 1751, the united army of the Dagestan feudal lords defeated the Georgian troops. This was one of the most serious defeats for Teimuraz II and Heraclius II. According to Petr Butkov, in 1752/1753 he came to Georgia with the Lezgin army Mersel-khan (Muhammad-nutsal) and surrounded the Mchadis-Jvari fortress. King Teimuraz in the first battle with him defeated and drove out the Lezgins, but then they gathered in Gartiskar and did not stop raiding Georgia. King Heraclius blocked their way and exterminated them all. But the joy of a major victory over the Khunzakh ruler was overshadowed by continuous small raids that continued until 1760.

=== Relations with the Russian Empire ===
In 1753, Muhammed-nutsal applied for acceptance into Russian citizenship.

Among other things, in the first quarter of the 19th century, some Chechen societies were politically dependent on the Avar Khan, and in a letter to the Kizlyar commandant received on May 21, 1758, Muhammad-nutsal motivated his negative attitude towards the alleged repressions of the tsarist authorities against the Chechens.

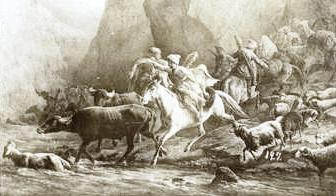
Return of Lezghians from a raid

=== War with the Guba Khanate ===
In 1765, Fatali Khan of Quba captured Derbent, and in 1768 occupied Shamakhi. The ruler of Shamakhi khanate Aghasi Khan fled to Karabakh, where he gathered a detachment and also attracted to his side the Muhammad Husayn Khan of Shaki and Muhammad-nutsal, who did not want the strengthening of Fatali Khan. The Avar nutsal sent an armed detachment led by his brother Muhammad Mirza and nephew Bulach. In the ensuing battle between Muhammad Husayn Khan, Aghasi Khan and the Avar nutsals on the one hand and Fatali Khan on the other, the first were defeated, Muhammad Mirza and his son Bulach killed, Muhammad Husayn Khan fled to Shaki and Aghasi Khan to Kotevan.

In the next battle between Khans and already the sons of the Avar nutsal on the one hand and Fatali Khan on the other, the first were defeated, both sons of the Avar nutsal died and the Khans fled to their lands again.

In 1774, Muhammad-nutsal himself opposed Fatali Khan and together with Aghasi Khan he finally managed to capture Shamakhi. However, soon, led by the forces recruited in his possessions and the detachment of Malik Muhammad Khan of Baku, Fatali Khan also hiring the Akushites moved to Shirvan. The Avar nutsal and Aghasi Khan moved to meet and entered into battle with him. The army of Aghashi Khan was defeated and fled, and the Nutsal decided to continue the fight, but in the end was defeated too. Not seeing a successful outcome of the battle, the Avar nutsal proposed negotiations, to which Fatali Khan agreed and invited him to his place for negotiations, where during the talks he was killed by the Akushites.

After his death, he was succeeded by his eldest son Umma Khan V. Wanting to avenge the death of his father, the new ruler of Avar lands began to prepare a campaign against Fatali Khan.

== Family ==
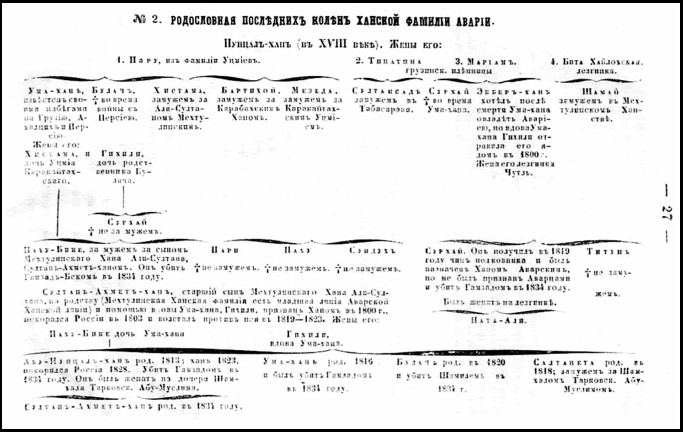
Genealogy of the Avar khans, compiled by A. Berge

According to the genealogy of the Avar khans compiled by Adolf Berge, Muhammed-nutsal had 4 wives and 9 children:

1. Paru from the Utsmiy clan
  1. Umma Khan V
  2. daughter Bulach died during the war with Persians
  3. daughter Histama married Ali-Sultan of Mehtuli
  4. daughter Bartikhoy (Bike, b. c. 1744) married Ibrahim Khalil Khan of Karabakh
  5. daughter Mesedu (Mezeda) is married to the Kaitag utsmiy
2. Tinatina taken prisoner Georgian
  1. daughter Sultanzada (Sultansad) married in Tabasaran
3. Maryam taken prisoner Georgian
  1. son Surkhay died during the life of his father
  2. son Gevek (Ekber Khan) "wanted to take possession of the Avar lands after the death of his father, but the widow of his brother Gikhilay poisoned him in 1800.
4. Bita, Lezgin woman
  1. daughter Shamay married in the Mehtuli Khanate

== See also ==
- Umma Khan V
- Fatali Khan
- Avar Khanate
- History of Dagestan

== Sources ==
- Aitberov, Timur (1986). Materials on the chronology and genealogy of the rulers of the Avaria. Makhachkala: Study of medieval Dagestan, p. 154–156.
- Ilyasov, Khizri (1997). Gazikumukh khans. Makhachkala: Dagestan Scientific Center of the Russian Academy of Sciences. p. 7.
- Kaziev, Shapi (2009). The collapse of the tyrant. Makhachkala: Эпоха. p. 10. ISBN 978-5-98390-066-0
- Totoev, Felix (2009). The social structure of Chechnya. — Institute of IAE DSC RAS. - Nalchik. 374 p. ISBN 978-5-88195-977-7
- Khapizov S. M. (2013). Umma Nutsal the Great. Makhachkala. p. 9, 31. ISBN 978-5-4242-0152-3
