= Sultan Ahmed I of Avaria =

Nutsal of Avars
- Reign: 1800—1823
- Predecessor: Gebek Khan I
- Successor: Surkhay Khan I
- Successor: Abu Sultan Khan I (as monarch); Bakhu Bike I (as regent)
- Born: Paraul village, Mehtuli Khanate
- Wives: Gikhilay; Bakhu Bike
- Issue: Sons: Abu Sultan Khan I nutsal Umma Khan; Bulach; Daughters: Sultaneta (Soltan-Bike)
- Father: Ali Sultan of Mehtulin
- Religion: Sunni Islam

Sultan Ahmed Khan I (Kumyk: Солтан Агьмат-Хан, 1802–1823) was the khan (governor) of the Avar Khanate from 1800 to 1823.

== Origin ==
He belonged to the Avar family of the Mehtulin khans, but after the suppression of the Avar khan's family in the male line he married the daughter of the previous ruler and took the title of Avar khan.

== Biography ==
=== Early years ===
The previous killed khan left daughters Bakhu Bike and Patimat, Georgian wife Darejan and half-brother Gebek. Uma Khan's last wife Khistaman, who opposed the coming to power of her husband's brother Gebek in every way fought for supremacy in the khanate too, and she was also supported by the local nobility. Nevertheless, Gebek became the ruler, who had been in this role for about 9 months, when a coup was carried out and the ruler was killed in January 1802, not without the intervention of Khistaman.

At this time, Sultan Ahmed Khan, the husband of the eldest daughter of the khan Bakhu Bike, who until that time had been with the title of bey in the village of Paraul, was invited to govern the Avar Khanate. But this time the struggle for power did not end either, because Surkhay, the son of the late Gebek, who settled in the village of Tukita also claimed power.

=== Relations with the Russian Empire ===
In 1803 he took an oath of Russian citizenship and in 1807 was granted the rank of major general.

Meanwhile, Sultan Ahmed Khan at the end of August 1819, at the head of a 6,000 detachment marched against the fortress of Vnezapnaya, but near the village of Bavtugay on the left bank of the Sulak river, utterly defeated by the tsarist troops fled to the mountains. As punishment for this, the manager of the civil part in Georgia, Astrakhan and the Caucasus provinces, general Aleksey Yermolov deposed Sultan Ahmed Khan, and entrusted the management of Avar Khanate to the son of Gebek khan Surkhay.

In 1819 general Yermolov promised Surkhay Khan through the intermediary of shamakhal of Tarki the rank of major general and 5.000 rubles of salary, if he could remove Sultan Ahmed Khan from power. However, all Surkhay Khan's attempts to establish himself in Avar lands were unsuccessful, because he was recognized only by the Russian administration and power was in the hands of Sultan Ahmed Khan I.

However, in 1826, Sultan Ahmed Khan died, leaving behind his young sons and daughter. The Caucasian command was forced to divide Avar Khanate into two parts, one of which was transferred to the control of Surkhay Khan and the other much larger part was ruled by the young son of Sultan Ahmed Khan – Abu Nutsal Khan.

== Family ==
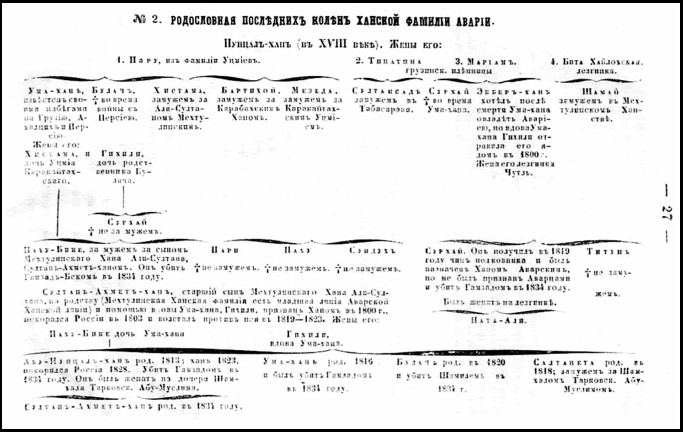
Genealogy of the Avar khans, compiled by A. Berge

According to the genealogy of the Avar khans compiled by Adolf Berge, Sultan Ahmed Khan married the widow of Umma Khan V named Gikhilay and his daughter Bakhu Bike. With them he had 4 children:

1. son Abu Sultan Khan I nutsal (1813–1834), khan since 1823. He was married to the daughter of shamkhal of Tarki Abu Muslim Khaibat, from whom a son was born, named after his grandfather Sultan Ahmed
2. son Umma Khan (1816–1834)
3. daughter of Sultaneta (Soltan-Bike, b. 1818) married shamkhal of Tarki Abu Muslim
4. son Bulach (1820–1834)

== See also ==
- Umma Khan V
- Avar Khanate
- History of Dagestan

== Sources ==
- Lemercier-Quelquejay Ch. La structure social, politique et religieuse du Caucase du Nord au XVI siècle // CMRS. Т. 25. No.2-3. Р. 125–148.
- Potto, Vasily (1991). Caucasian War. Stavropol. p. 199.
- Genichutlinsky, Haydarbek (1992). Historical-biographical and historical essays. Makhachkala: Dagestan Scientific Center of the Russian Academy of Sciences. p. 40.
