= Umma Khan V =

Eighteenth century ruler of Avar Khanate

Umma Khan the Great
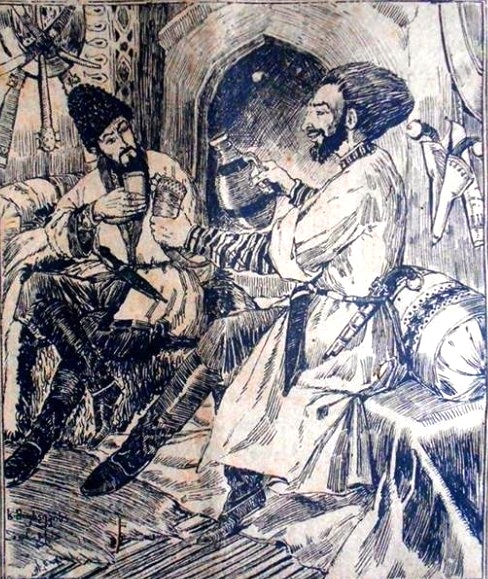
- Umma Khan and Prince Alexander by Khalil-Bek Musayasul (1897–1949).

Nutsal of Avars
- Reign: 1774–1801
- Predecessor: Muhammad IV
- Successor: Gebek I
- Born: 1761 or 1762; Khunzakh, Avar Khanate
- Died: 1801 (aged 39–40); Balaken or İlisu, Elisu Sultanate
- Burial: Jar, Azerbaijan
Names
- Avar: Кӏудияв Гӏумахан
- House: Dynasty of Nutsals
- Father: Muhammad IV
- Mother: Bakhu
- Religion: Sunni Islam

Umma Khan V (Avar: Кӏудияв Гӏумахан; 1761 or 1762 – March 22, 1801), also known as Omar Khan (Note: Also known as Omar Khan in Russian sources.) and nicknamed the Great or the Mad, was the ruler (nutsal) (Note: Nutsal was the title of kings of the Avar Khanate.) of the Avar Khanate from 1774 to 1801. Under Umma Khan, the Avar Khanate expanded its borders both by subordinating the Avar free societies, (Note: Free societies are associations of rural communities of a semi-patriarchal-semi-feudal type in Dagestan that retained independence from feudal lords.) and at the expense of neighboring territories. He was paid tribute by the Georgian king Erekle II, Derbent, Quba, Baku, Shirvan, Shaki khans and the Ottoman pasha of Akhaltsikhe.

== Early life ==
He was born in 1761, Avar village of Khunzakh to Muhammad IV, khan of Avars and his wife Bakha, daughter of Ahmad Khan, Utsmi of Kaitags. He had three full sisters and a half-brother named Gebek. His father Muhammad was a rival of Fatali Khan of Quba. He marched on Shamakhi in alliance with Aghasi Khan in 1774, however was forced to negotiate when Aghasi was routed. However he was killed by Akushans, Dargin allies of Fatali Khan. Umma inherited the rulership of the khanate when he was just 12.

== Reign ==
The strengthening of power and the expansion of the sphere of influence of Fatali Khan already alarmed the neighboring rulers. In the first year of his reign, Umma Khan tried to forge an anti-Quba alliance with other Dagestani and Caucasian feudal lords. He married his sister Bakhtika to Ibrahim Khalil Khan of Karabakh to forge an alliance. The Dagestani coalition of rulers included Kaitag utsmi Amir Hamza (also, Umma's uncle), ruler of Mehtuli khanate – Ali-Sultan, Ghāzī Rustam of Tabasaran, Tishsiz Muhammad (Muhammad the Toothless) - head of Kazanishche Kumyks; they were also joined by the Kumyks of Endirey, Kostek and others.

Having gathered a 4,000-strong army, coalition was led by Amir Hamza who marched into Quba but retreated north where he was ambushed by Fatali's armies. Nevertheless, coalition defeated Fath Ali's army of 8,000 in the battle of Gavdushan, near the city of Khudat in July 1774 and forced him to flee to Salyan.

After some time, at the request of the Akhty people, in the autumn of 1782, Umma Khan made a new campaign against Fatali Khan, devastated villages of Quba, and returned to his possessions.

=== First invasion of Georgia ===
Meanwhile, the intensification of Russian presence in Dagestan caused dissatisfaction in Sublime Porte, which decided to take retaliatory measures. The sultan sent Umma Khan a "salary" of 500 piastres and promised him, upon raiding Georgia, "to satisfy his troops with food and fodder for four months". Sultan's subordinate, Akhaltsikhe pasha also instigated him.

Later on September 16, 1784, news was received in Tiflis about the entrance of Umma Khan to Alazan valley with the support of Ali-Sultan of Mehtuli Khanate at the head of 15,000 strong army. The Georgian king Heraclius II gathered his own army against him, called on Ossetians and Ingush to help. A Russian detachment under the command of Stepan Burnashev arrived to help the Georgians as well. Burnashev immediately moved with his troops to Signakhi and offered Heraclius to immediately attack the Avars at their crossing of the river. But Heraclius did not dare to leave the stronghold of Signakh. Umma Khan calmly crossed the Alazan and bypassed the Georgian army locked in the fortress, marching on Tiflis. This bold maneuver overturned all the calculations of Heraclius, and he had to rush to the defense of the capital with a forced march. But as soon as Burnashev approached the Metekhi bridge, Umma changed direction and rushed deep into Kartli raiding the region. He took the Agjaqala fortress in Borchali. In this battle, the Georgian side lost 640 people killed, 860 were taken prisoner. Then the Avars captured the Akhtala mines and copper smelters, after which they moved towards Lori and devastated this region.

In late October – early November, Umma Khan raided Upper Imereti and besieged the Fortress of Vakhani. Unable to take the castle by storm, he twice tried to blow it up, but without success. Then he invited Eugenius Abashidze, Grand Master of the Court of Georgia to enter into negotiations, but as soon as the latter arrived at the khan's headquarters, he was detained and made a prisoner. As a result, 700 people were captured, all the men are put to death, except the princes, and the buildings in the castle are reduced to ashes. During the raid, he captured daughters of Eugenius Abashidze, Grand Master of the Court of Georgia. She took the sister Darejan to herself and gave Sofia to his brother-in-law Ibrahimkhalil in 1786. Both women were converted to Islam, Sofia renamed to Javahir. Then Umma Khan moved to Akhaltsikhe and camped there for the winter.

The panic caused by him was so great that the Georgian cavalry did not dare to go on reconnaissance, and therefore hunters had to be hired for a large fee in order to obtain the necessary information. These hunters made their way to the mountains, looked out for the enemy from afar, and then, after waiting for the night, returned to the king in a roundabout way. According to Vasily Potto, it was clear that "such people could deliver only the most incorrect information, and belated ones at that, since the enemy, while they were making their way from the enemy camp to the Georgian one, could spark up and down the whole of Georgia."

During winter, Umma Khan began to prepare a new campaign from Akhalkalaki to the Tskhinvali Gorge. Upon learning of this, Heraclius II who did not have sufficient forces in those conditions to repulse the enemy, was then forced to accept the condition of peace with the obligation to pay annually 10,000 rubles in silver and ransom the prisoners for 50 rubles per person. In April 1786, Umma Khan went to Karabakh through the Erivan Khanate from there, through Georgia and Shirvan, Umma Khan returned to his homeland, plundering the Ganja Khanate along the way and taking from Rahim Khan an indemnity in the amount of 5,000 rubles.

=== Insurgence in Chechnya ===
After Sheikh Mansur's emergence in Chechnya, Umma Khan established contacts with him in March 1785, but didn't think he was powerful enough to join gazavat, according to Mirza Hasan Alkadari.

=== Rivalry with Quba Khanate ===
At the end of 1786, Umma Khan began a punitive campaign against Shamakhi for the reason that Fath Ali violated the terms of the agreement to pay Umma 5,000 rubles annually. Approaching Shamakhi, the highlanders suddenly attacked and captured the city. Shamakhi was burned down and the inhabitants were killed. Fath Ali was forced to enter into negotiations with Umma Khan, betrohed him his daughter as his future wife, handed over the revenues of Salyan and 200,000 rubles of indemnity. The marriage on the other hand, never took place.

Umma Khan, having gathered 20,000 people, again made a campaign against Fatali Khan and besieged the city of Aghsu in 1788. However, later the Shamkhal of Tarki came to Fatali Khan's rescue and forced Umma Khan to retreat to Karabakh, domains of his brother-in-law Ibrahim Khalil Khan. According to Heraclius II's letter to Grigory Potemkin on 20 January 1788, Umma Khan not having achieved another pan-Dagestani coalition against Fath Ali Khan (they refused to be fight citing religious reasons), managed to forge an alliance against Georgia. Later Umma Khan aided Askar Khan to take Shirvan Khanate for himself after death of Fath Ali in 1789.

=== Invasion of Nakhchivan and Khoy and struggle with Iran ===
Umma Khan raided Georgia, and arrived from there to Karabakh at the request of Ibrahim Khalil Khan in 1787 with an army according to Armenian historian Mirza Yusuf Nersesov. Then, Nutsal and Khan moved towards Nakhchivan and besieged it and captured it after a 17-day siege. Kalb-Ali Khan Kangarlu appealed to Mohammad Khan Qajar of Erivan for help, who in turn sent Kurdish auxiliaries composed of Zilans and Turkic Karapapaks. Sides met at Qarababa and Kalb-Ali was forced to flee from the scene. After some time, the troops of the "seven Azerbaijani khanates" and soldiers from other places suddenly attacked the Avars. The allied army was defeated and put to flight. The Avars began to pursue them, and as a result, the khanates lost over 500 people. Later Umma Khan, together with the Karabakh army, approached the borders of Karadagh, overtook and devastated this region. According to Genichutlinsky, "in every village, in every city where the troops of Umma Khan broke into, there was always death and destruction."

Already after Karim Khan Zand's death in 1779, Iran was once again thrown into turmoil and Agha Muhammad Khan rose as victor among several rivalling warlords. Trying to use the vacuum, Umma Khan accompanied Ibrahim Khalil in 1788–1789 to capture Khoy. However, they were defeated by Jafarqoli khan Donboli. Ibrahim's vizier Molla Panah Vagif was among the prisoners. They were ransomed later.

Having captured, the last stronghold of the Zands - the city of Shiraz in 1791, Agha Muhammad began to prepare troops for the conquest of Transcaucasia. In 1795, Muhammad Hasan of Shaki, Umma Khan's neighbor expressed his obedience to the Shah of Iran and received from him an army with which he was to conquer Shirvan. At the same time, Muhammad's younger brother, Salim, turned to Umma Khan and Mustafa Khan of Shirvan with a request for help in the struggle for the Shaki throne. Nutsal sent a detachment led by the vizier Aliskandi against Shah's army. Luckily for Salim, a sudden arrest of Muhammad Hasan by Mostafa khan Davalu-Qajar (a general under Agha Muhammad) on the charge of treason, led him to re-occupy Shaki using the opportunity.

=== Second invasion of Georgia ===
Despite the agreement with Heraclius II on the payment of an annual salary to Umma Khan, the latter, under one pretext or another, invaded Georgia and plundered it. In 1796, after the deployment of Russian troops in Georgia, the payment of tribute ceased. Umma Khan, in response, sent his half-brother Gebek and vizier Aliskandi to plunder Kakheti. The Avars reportedly burned 6 villages to the ground, and took the inhabitants and livestock with them to the mountains. Umma then turned to Valerian Zubov with a request to accept him into Russian citizenship. The latter guaranteed that in this case Umma Khan would be given an annual salary in the same amount of Georgian king. Zubov also assured that "serving the great Empress, the khan will become his brother." However, Umma Khan, according to his own statement, was afraid that, having entered into Russian citizenship, he could be “compared to small lords” and would not receive the due salary, as a result of which he asked to be paid two years in advance in compensation to the tribute he was to take from Heraclius. The conditions put forward by him were not satisfied and the negotiations ended in nothing.

=== Attack on Ganja ===
Same year Agha Muhammad Khan arrived at Ganja Khanate and sent Heraclius II his last ultimatum, inviting him to submit. However, receiving no reply, shah marched on Tiflis, guided by Javad Khan. Plundering the city for 9 days and taking thousands as slaves, shah left the city in ruins and moved on to capture Shaki and Shirvan Khanates. Having lost his patron after the departure of the Iranian troops for Khorasan, Javad Khan tried to smooth out his relations with Heraclius. However, in February 1796 latter sent a 3000-strong army to Ganja under leadership of his son Alexander. But the latter's army soon deserted him. Immediately after him, Ibrahim Khalil and Umma Khan besieged Ganja in March 1796. While Heraclius was gathering the army for the second time, Ibrahim Khan began negotiations with Javad Khan, and as soon as the news of the departure of Heraclius' troops from Tiflis reached him, he concluded an alliance with Ganja. Having taken from him an indemnity in the amount of 10000 rubles and Javad's son and sister as hostages, the Karabakh khan retreated from the fortress. Umma was content with the fact that he received 40 rubles for each of his warriors and also returned to his own domain.

Next year enraged Agha Muhammad returned and captured Shusha fortress. Ibrahim fled to Umma Khan, realizing he wouldn't be able to resist. However, Agha Mohammad Khan was assassinated in Shusha three days after its capture. Ibrahim then returned to Shusha and gave Aga Mohammad Khan an honourable burial. In order to retain his position and ensure peaceful relations with the shah, he gave one of his daughters to Agha Mohammad Khan's successor to the throne, Fat′h Ali Shah Qajar.

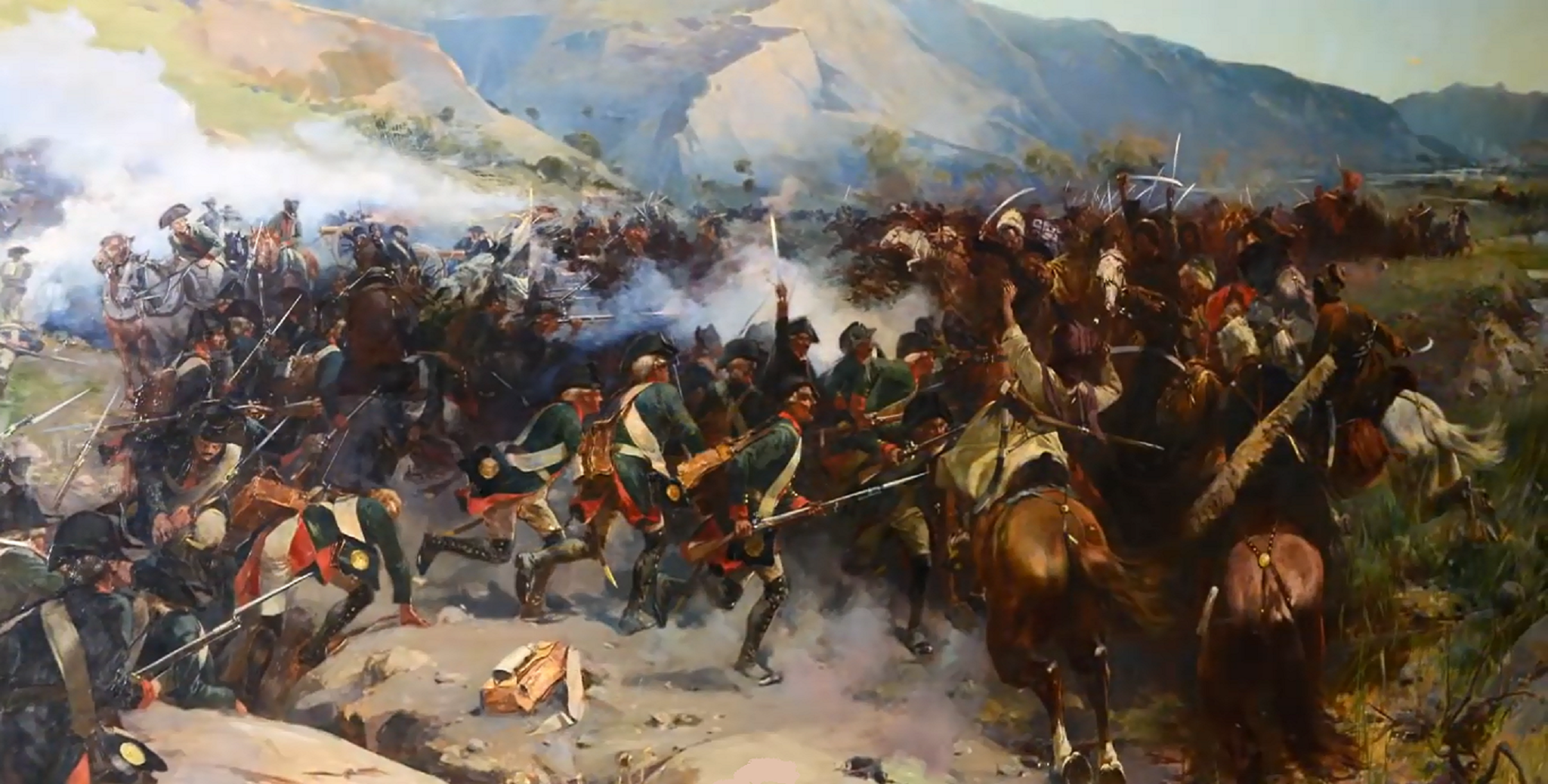
Battle of Niakhura (1800) by Nikolay Samokish

=== Third invasion of Georgia ===
After the death of Heraclius II, the Georgian throne was taken by his eldest son George XII. Following his accession, George XII was forced to sign a decree recognizing his half-brother Iulon as heir to the throne, a decision made by the king to avoid a civil war in a kingdom stuck between the Russian Empire and a hostile Persia. However, he hoped to nullify the decree in favor of his oldest son David, at the time in Russia's military service, a plan quickly discovered by Queen Dowager Darejan and her sons.

In 1799, the Georgian prince Alexander, dissatisfied with the decision of his brother, turned to Umma Khan with a request to capture Tiflis and enthrone him. Umma Khan succumbed to the persuasion of the prince and moved an army of 15 to 20,000 to Georgia. Alexander and Umma agreed to invade Kakheti, while princes Iulon, Pharnavaz and Vakhtang prepared to occupy the Darial Gorge, the only opening in the Russia-Georgia natural border, to avoid Russian reinforcements from intervening. The three brothers agreed to divide the kingdom amongst themselves in case of success.

In August 1800, the Avars launched their first attempted invasion in Kakheti's Sagarejo province. However, they were quickly defeated and forced to retrieve by the forces led by princes Ioane and Bagrat, sons of George XII, during a battle in Niakhuri, on the shores of the Alazan river on August 15. But Umma managed to gather new forces and received the military support of Fath-Ali Shah Qajar and Pasha of Childir. Waiting for a new opportunity to attack, Alexander addressed the Georgian people, swearing on the tomb of Saint Nino that his alliance with Avars was only temporary and was meant to restore the legitimate order in the country.

In early November, an army of 12,000 Avars led by Umma and Alexander invaded Kakheti. George XII, increasingly distant from his royal responsibilities, appointed princes Ioane and Bagrat as responsible for the Georgian forces. Ioane became head of the Georgian artillery and was reinforced by the Russian forces of Lazarev and Guliakov. 2,000 Russians, Kakhetians, and mountain militants from Pshavi, Tusheti and Khevsureti, had to face the invaders. On November 7, 1800, the two sides met at the junction of the Iori and Alazani rivers.

During the Battle of Niakhura on November 7, the Georgian-Russian forces came out victorious. Following the loss of 2,000 men, the Avars ran away and Umma was severely injured. Allies decided to repeat the attack in the spring and spend the winter in Karabakh. However, due to lack of provisions, the khan sent his army home, and he went to Balaken. Alexander moved on to Karabakh with 2,000 partisans.

== Death ==
Umma Khan gathered a 3,000-strong army for a campaign against the Ganja Khanate at the beginning of 1801. The Russian authorities in Georgia, concerned about this, began to strengthen the borders of Kakheti, transferring several military units there. However, on 22 March 1801, the Khan suddenly fell ill and died in Balaken and was buried in Car. According to Abbasgulu Bakikhanov, Umma Khan was seriously wounded in the battle of Iori and died in Elisu. According to Genichutlinsky, Umma Khan could have been poisoned: "A rumor spread that the cause of Umma Khan’s death was that Javad Khan, the Emir of Ganja, passed the poison to the servant oh his, who mixed it into Umma Khan’s food".

Since Umma Khan had no sons, power over Avar Khan passed to his half-brother Gebek, whose mother was a Georgian Maryam. To assert his power in Avar Khanate, Gebek married Gihilay, the widow of Umma Khan, who later murdered him. With deaths of Umma and Gebek, the dynasty of Nutsals came to an end. The empty throne was offered to Sultan Ahmad khan, who was a son-in-law of Umma Khan.

== Legacy ==
Khan became famous primarily for his numerous military campaigns in the Transcaucasian countries. According to Alexander Neverovsky, the Dagestani highlanders “were never so terrible, in general for the entire Transcaucasia, as in the second half of the 18th century, and especially when they had Omar Khan of Avar as their leader”.

According to Genichutlinsky, "Uma Khan, the son of Muhammad Nutsal, was a handsome man, full of deep dignity, a self-possessed and at the same time brave, affable and benevolent man. He had a beautiful face, a pleasant timbre of speech. He spoke in a literary language and had a good memory. With people who were in a dull state, he tried to joke, so that with a rare, interesting word or expression, to calm them down and even cheer them up. Vile words and angry speeches never came from his mouth. Being both in joy and in grief, in front of the people he constantly smiled, both at noble people and at the lowest, and this made them forget their anxieties and sorrows."

During his reign, a separate 38-letter alphabet in Arabic script for Avar language was developed by Dibirqadi al-Khunzakhi who also compiled a Persian-Arabic-Turkish dictionary under orders of Umma. He introduced a legislative reform in Avar Khanate in 1796, banning certain pagan practices.

== Family ==
Umma Khan had three wives and only had daughters:

- Gikhilay (Avar: КIилъилай, d. 29 July 1833) — a cousin (daughter of Muhammad Mirza, uncle of Umma), later married Umma's half-brother Gebek, and then Sultan Ahmad khan
- Khistaman (Avar: ХъистIаман)— daughter of Kaitag utsmi
  - Bakhu Bika - married to Sultan Ahmad khan, future nutsal of the Avar Khanate
  - Pari (died in childhood)
  - Bakhu (died in childhood)
- Darejan Abashidze — daughter of Eugenius Abashidze, Grand Master of the Court of Georgia
  - Yakhsipatimat (d. 1813/1814)

== See also ==
- Sultan Ahmed Khan of Avar
- Avar Khanate
- History of Dagestan

== Sources ==
- Abdullaev, G. B. (1958). Из истории Северо-Восточного Азербайджана в 60-80-х гг. XVIII в.. [From the history of North-East Azerbaijan in the 60-80s. 18th century] (in Russian). Publishing House of the Academy of Sciences of the Azerbaijan SSR. p. 209.
- Aitberov, Timur (1986). Материалы по хронологии и генеалогии правителей Аварии [Materials on the chronology and genealogy of the rulers of Avaria] (in Russian). Makhachkala: Source study of medieval Dagestan. p. 159.
- Asatiani, Nodar; Bendianashvili, Alexandre (1997). Histoire de la Géorgie. Paris: L'Harmattan. ISBN 2-7384-6186-7.
- Chrysanth (1958). Сведения об Аварском ханстве [Information about the Avar Khanate] (in Russian) (History, geography and ethnography of Dagestan XVIII-XIX centuries. ed.). Makhachkala: Oriental literature RAS.
- Bournoutian, George (2021). From the Kur to the Aras: A Military History of Russia's Move into the South Caucasus and the First Russo-Iranian War, 1801–1813. Brill. ISBN 978-9004445154.
- Butkov, Pyotr Grigoriyevich (1869). Материалы для новой истории Кавказа, с 1722 по 1803 год, ч. II [Materials of the new history of the Caucasus, from 1722 to 1803. Part II] (in Russian). Tiflis: Enfyandjyants and Co.
- Lang, David Marshall (1957). The Last Years of Georgian Monarchy. New York: Columbia University Press.
- Gvosdev, Nikolas K. (2000). Imperial Policies and Perspectives towards Georgia, 1760–1819. London: MacMillan Press LTD. ISBN 0-333-74843-3.
- Asatiani, Nodar; Janelidze, Otar (2009). History of Georgia. Tbilisi: Publishing House Petite. ISBN 978-9941-9063-6-7.
- Allen, W.E.D. (1932). A History of the Georgian People. London: Routledge & Keagan Paul.
