= Bakhu Bike I =

Regent of Avars
- Regency: 1823—1834
- Monarch: Abu Sultan Khan I
- Born: unknown
- Died: August 1834
- Spouse: Sultan Ahmed Khan
- Issue: Nutsal Khan, Umma Khan, Bulach Khan, daughter Sultanat
- Father: Umma Khan V
- Mother: Khistaman
- Religion: Sunni Islam

Bakhu Bike I or Pahu Bike (died August 1834) was the daughter of Umma Khan V and the wife of Sultan Ahmed Khan. Being regent, she was one of the very few women known to have had influence over the affairs of the state in the Avar Khanate.

== Biography ==
=== Early years ===
She was born in the village of Khunzakh in the family of Umma Khan V of Avar and his wife Khistaman. Soon, Bakhu Bike married Sultan Ahmed, a nobleman from the clan of shamkhals of Tarki. Her father had no sons and when there were no pretenders to rule after his death in 1801, Bakhu Bike convinced the nobility to support her husband. In 1823, her husband Sultan Ahmed died. Their children were still very young and therefore Bakhu Bike was forced to take over the government. Unlike her father, she did not seek to unleash wars, continued her course for Russian citizenship, successfully defended the Khanate from the murids, and preferred to resolve controversial cases by advantageous marriages, for which she was often credited with intrigue.

=== Relations with Imams ===
Bakhu Bike successfully married her son Nutsal to the daughter of shamkhal of Tarki, and the daughter Sultanat wanted to marry his son, hoping that she could increase the lands of Avaria at the expense of new relatives. However, there were many suitors for marriage with her daughter, and because of this, the Avar Khanate was left without its old ally in the fight against the murids.

In 1830, Bakhu Bike came out openly against the murids of Ghazi Muhammad. Seeing a huge column of murids numbering 8,000 people, the Khunzakh people fell into a panic. But then Bakhu Bike appeared with a saber in her hands and shouted: “If you are afraid, give us women your swords and hide behind our skirts".

The people of Khunzakh rushed at the enemy in a rage and Ghazi Muhammad had to retreat. For this victory, Nicholas I of Russia granted the Avar Khanate a banner with the coat of arms of Russia and a cutout for a dress for Bakhu Bike.

The weakening of the positions of the Avar Khanate immediately interested again Imam Ghazi Muhammad. Bakhu Bike foresaw this and contacted the Russian command in Tbilisi. But the Russian troops themselves were firmly bogged down in the fight against Muridism, so the command provided only solid financial assistance for the formation of mountain militia units. However, soon Ghazi Muhammad met his death in the village of Gimry, where one of the two survivors was still young (and not yet an Imam) Shamil.

The new Imam was Hamzat Bek, who was a distant relative of Bakhu Bike. He lived quite calmly in Khunzakh with them. However, he made very tough demands to Bakhu Bike, among which was the introduction of Sharia law and the breaking of the alliance with the Russian Empire.

She refused this, agreeing only to accept Sharia. Hamzat Bek pretended to be satisfied with this and as a sign of trust, he asked to give him one of the representatives of the khanate. To make the contract stronger, Bakhu Bike gave her 8-year-old son Bulach. She calmed down, but soon discovered the army of Hamzat Bek near the capital itself. Hamzat Bek demanded to obey him and then her son Umma Khan wanting to save his young brother tried to enter the camp, but was captured.

The book "History of Dagestan" cites a letter that Bakhu Bike sent to Imam Shamil to cause discord between him and Hamzat Bek. In the letter, she urged him to distract Hamzat Bek from Khunzakh and then he received 2 thousand rubles as a reward, but Shamil did not hide the contents of the letter.

=== Death ===
Bakhu Bike sent her eldest son Nutsal immediately went to negotiate in Hamzat Bek instead of gathering an army. But Nutsal was killed, as was Umma Khan, and the younger son of Bakhu Bike was also drowned in the river by murids. So the male branch of the Avar khans was killed.

There are two versions of further developments. According to the first, Hamzat Bek entered Khunzakh and ordered the murids to kill her there with an ax or Hamzat Bek first decided to deal with Surkhay Khan, an ally of the Russian Empire with the rank of colonel, who also had the right to rule in the Avar Khanate. He later took Bakha Bike to the village of Genichutl, where he later executed her.

== See also ==
- Umma Khan V
- Sultan Ahmed Khan
- Avar Khanate
- History of Dagestan

== Sources ==
- Khalidov M. R.; Gamzatov, Gadzhi (2004). Oral folk art of the Avars. Institute of Language, Literature and Art named after Gamzat Tsadasa. pp. 71, 260.
- Mutieva, Oksana (2013). "Women in the social and political life of Dagestan (14th–19th centuries)". p. 49–52. ISSN 2410-3691
- Shurpaev, Miyasat (2022-05-15). Предания старины глубокой – Legends of ancient times. Litres. ISBN 978-5-457-67554-4
- Ibragimov, Maryam (2022-05-15). Imam Shamil. Book one. Litres. ISBN 978-5-04-115830-9
