= Umma Khan IV =

Nutsal of Avars
- Reign: 1722 — 1735
- Predecessor: Muhammad Nutsal III
- Successor: Khankalav
- Born: 17th-century Khunzakh
- Died: 1735/1736
- Issue: Muhammad-nutsal IV, Muhammad Mirza, Umma Khan
- Father: Elder Bulach
- Religion: Islam

Umma Khan IV (Avar: Гӏумахан, 1725—1735) was an Avar nutsal (ruler), who ruled from 1725 to 1735.

== Origin ==
Based on written sources, it is assumed that Umma Khan was the son of Bulach, the son of Dugri Nutsal II. According to another version, Ummakhan IV was the son of this Ummakhan III, whose nickname was "The Elder Bulach".

== Biography ==
He came to power in 1722 after the death of the past Muhammad Nutsal III. As the ruler of Avar lands, he is mentioned in 1727 and 1728. In a letter addressed to a certain Kulizan, written no earlier than 1730, he called himself the Sultan of the Khundzia. In 1142 AH (1729/1730) “in the village of Kakh, Umma-khan-nusal killed two of his brothers – Khankalav and Muhammad”.

In 1734, when Gazikumukh Khanate was captured by Nader Shah and its ruler Surkhaykhan fled with his family to Khunzakh to Umma Khan, in the spring of 1735 he left Avar lands, but again In December after another defeat he again fled to Avaria.

Shamkhal of Tarki named Adil-Gerey, on the contrary, swore allegiance to shah. In response to in 1148 AH (1735/1736), Umma Khan decided to punish him for departing from the policy of the mountain rulers and attacked his village Paraul. As a result of this campaign the village was burned, but at a great cost – in the Paraul battle Umma Khan died. his detachment was defeated by the Kumyks and fled to the mountains.

After his death, he was succeeded by his young sons Muhammad-nutsal and Muhammad Mirza.

== See also ==
- Muhammad-nutsal IV
- Gazikumukh Khanate
- Shamkhalate of Tarki
- History of Deagestan

== Sources ==
- Neverovsky, Alexander (1848). A brief look at the Northern and Middle Dagestan before the destruction of the influence of the Lezgins in the Transcaucasus. St. Petersburg.
- Aitberov, Timur (1986). Materials on the chronology and genealogy of the rulers of the Avaria. Makhachkala: Study of medieval Dagestan. pp. 153–154, 188–190.
- Rasul, Magomedov (2002). History of Dagestan. Makhachkala: Research Institute of Pedagogy. pp. 234–235.
