= Hamzat Bek =

Second imam of Dagestan (1789-1834)

Imam of Dagestan
- Reign: 1832–1834
- Predecessor: Ghazi Muhammad
- Successor: Shamil
- Born: Hamzat-Bek ibn Ali Iskandar-Bek al-Hutsali al-Awari al-Daghistani; 1789; Gotsatl, Avar Khanate, Dagestan
- Died: 1 October [O.S. 19 September] 1834 (aged 44–45); Khunzakh, Dagestan
- Religion: Islam

Hamzat Bek (also Hamza, or Gamzat from the Russian rendering; Avar: ХIамзат Бек, romanized: Ħamzat Bek; Chechen: Хьамзат Бек, romanized: Ẋamzat Bek; Russian: Гамзат-бек, romanized: Gamzat-bek; 1789 – 1 October [O.S. 19 September] 1834) (Note: Full name (in Arabic, the literary language of Dagestan at the time): Ḥamzat-Bek (Ḥamza Bīk) ibn ʿAlī Iskandar-Bek al-Hūtsālī al-Awārī al-Dāghistānī) was the imam of Dagestan between 1832 and 1834. He was the second leader of the movement begun by his predecessor Ghazi Muhammad for the implementation of sharia in Dagestan. He fought against local communities and rulers that followed customary law (adat) and against the Russian army. Unlike his predecessor Ghazi Muhammad and his successor Shamil, Hamzat Bek was the son of an Avar nobleman and was not a member of the Naqshbandiyya-Khalidiyya Sufi order. He became one of Ghazi Muhammad's commanders and was immediately proclaimed the imam's successor after his death in battle in October 1832. By early 1834, he had subjugated most of the Avar plateau and captured Khunzakh, the capital of the Avar Khanate, killing its ruling family. After this, Hamzat Bek may have claimed the title of Avar khan, trying to combine the authority of the traditional Avar nobility with the Islamic authority of his movement. In October 1834, he was assassinated by Hajji Uthman, a relative of the Avar ruling family and the brother of Hajji Murad.

== Early life ==
Hamzat Bek was born in 1789 in the large village of Hutsal or Gotsatl in the Avar Khanate to a noble father and a commoner mother. This made him a member of the janka class. His father was close to the Avar khan Ali Sultan Ahmad and was a respected figure among the Avars for his bravery and administrative skills. He spent a few years of his adolescence at the khan's residence in Khunzakh, where Ali Sultan Ahmad's widow Pakhu Bike arranged for his education. Hamzat Bek received an education in Shafi'i Islamic law and Arabic under a number of Avar learned men. In his youth, he drank alcohol, but he stopped when he met the Dagestani religious reformer Ghazi Muhammad. Hamzat became a pious Muslim and joined Ghazi Muhammad's movement to impose sharia (Islamic law) in Dagestan, where customary law (adat) was widely followed instead. However, he never joined the Naqshbandiyya-Khalidiyya Sufi order, of which Ghazi Muhammad and the third imam Shamil were members. (Note: Moshe Gammer writes that Hamzat Bek was in fact a member of the order.)

== Under Ghazi Muhammad ==
In late 1829–early 1830, Ghazi Muhammad was proclaimed imam (religious and political leader) of Dagestan and he declared the beginning of a holy war (jihad or ghazawat) against the Russians. Hamzat Bek had participated in fighting against the Russians earlier in 1826, and he may have helped convince Ghazi Muhammad to declare jihad. He became one of Ghazi Muhammad's main commanders and led one of the counterattacks against the Russians after they conquered Jar-Balakan (south of Dagestan, in modern-day Azerbaijan) in 1830. In the autumn of 1830, Hamzat raided Georgian settlements in the Alazani valley in Kakheti. In early 1831, he made a joint declaration with Ghazi Muhammad exhorting the Muslims of the region to continue the fight against the Russians. However, in June 1831, Hamzat Bek negotiated with the Russians, but was taken prisoner and sent to Tiflis. He gave his son as a hostage to secure his own release. He rejoined Ghazi Muhammad after learning that his son had died in captivity. Hamzat Bek was wounded in battle in early July 1832, but he went on to campaign in Jar-Balakan in July–August that year. He was in his home village at the start of the Battle of Gimry. He rushed to assist Ghazi Muhammad's forces, but he did not arrive in time. Ghazi Muhammad was killed at the Battle of Gimry on 29 October 1832.

== Election and reign as imam ==
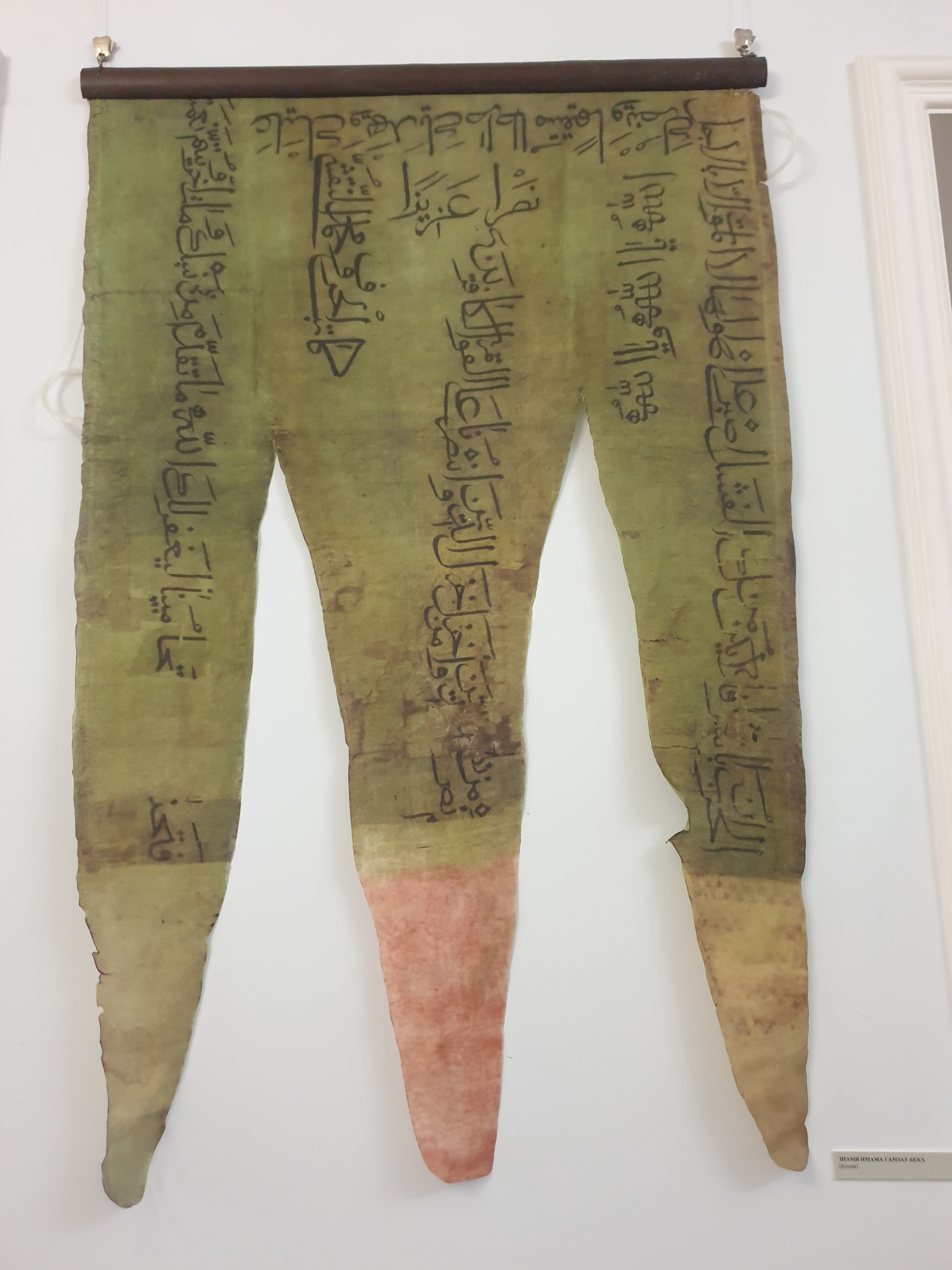
A copy of the banner used by Hamzat Bek (National Museum of the Republic of Dagestan)

After the death of Ghazi Muhammad, Hamzat Bek was proclaimed imam by the Dagestani ulama and notables. This was done at the initiative of Muhammad al-Yaraghi, a Naqshbandi sheikh who supported Ghazi Muhammad's jihad (alternatively, Michael Kemper writes that Hamzat Bek "had himself proclaimed the new imām"). According to some sources, the choice for a new imam was between Hamzat Bek and Shamil, but Hamzat Bek was chosen since Shamil was still recovering from wounds received at the Battle of Gimry and Hamzat, as a wealthy janka, had more means to win over supporters.

Many of Ghazi Muhammad's followers had abandoned the movement shortly before or after his death, and few local elites initially accepted Hamzat Bek's authority. At first, his rule did not extend beyond Hustal, Ashilta, Gimrah, Tiliq and Mohokh. He used force to bring the communities back under the control of the imamate. In the summer of 1832, he made another incursion into Kakheti and conducted punitive attacks on Avar and Dargin communities in central Dagestan that had cooperated with the Russians. However, he also tried to negotiate with the Russians. He was invited to negotiations at Temir-Khan-Shura, but he was distrustful of the Russians since his earlier imprisonment and preferred to send letters. In one of these letters, he proposed peace with Russia as long as they would not interfere with the enforcement of sharia. When this was unsuccessful, he turned to the shamkhal—the ruler of a Kumyk principality based in Tarki—to mediate. Hamzat Bek did not know that the shamkhal himself had been urging the Russians to attack the imam. These negotiations failed as well and were the last to occur under Hamzat Bek.

In October 1833, Hamzat Bek forced the village of Gergebil to accept his rule, defeating the forces of the shamkhal, the khan of Mehtuli and the confederation of Aqusha which had come to Gergebil's aid. Unlike his predecessor and successor, who relied mainly on the uzden ("free") communities and rarely on the nobility, Hamzat Bek focused on gaining the support of the royal family of the Avar Khanate, with which he had personal connections. The Avar Khanate's de facto ruler Pakhu Bike had sometimes accepted Hamzat Bek's calls to enforce sharia, but she also wanted Russian assistance to preserve the khanate's independence. Additionally, she was pushed by the Russians to oppose Hamzat Bek. In March 1834, Pakhu Bike secretly attempted to organize Hamzat Bek's murder.

By early 1834, Hamzat Bek controlled most of the Avar confederacies around the Avar Khanate, including Koisubu, Gumbet, Andi, and Andalal. In the summer of 1834, he besieged Khunzakh for two weeks. Pakhu Bike gave two of her sons to Hamzat Bek as hostages to secure an agreement. On 25 August [O.S. 13 August], another son of Pakhu Bike came to negotiate with Hamzat Bek, but a fight unintentionally broke out, causing the deaths of Pakhu Bike's sons Nusal and Umma and their men and the imam's brother and some of his followers. Ḥamzat Bek then stormed Khunzakh and ordered the killing of Pakhu Bike and all of the women of the Avar royal family, except for Pakhu Bike's pregnant daughter-in-law. After this, Hamzat Bek may have claimed the title of Avar khan, trying to combine the authority of the traditional nobility with the Islamic authority of his movement.

Hamzat Bek gained as an ally Hajj Tasho, an important leader in Chechnya, which alarmed the Russians. In early September, Hamzat Bek resumed campaigning and unsuccessfully tried to take Tsudakhar in the Aqusha confederation. Still viewing Hamzat Bek as a dangerous enemy, the Russians planned new operations against the imam. Before this could occur, Hamzat Bek was assassinated on 1 October [O.S. 19 September] 1834 in front of the Khunzakh Friday mosque by Hajji Uthman, a relative of the Avar ruling family and the brother of Hajji Murad (the subject of Leo Tolstoy's famous novella). The assassination was an act of revenge for the destruction of the Avar ruling family, as Uthman and Hajji Murad had been "milk brothers" of the khan. Uthman was killed immediately after assassinating Hamzat Bek. Hamzat Bek was succeeded as imam by Shamil. His grave is located in Khunzakh. (Note: See Lavrov 1968, pp. 100–103 for the Arabic inscription on Hamzat Bek's tombstone.)

== Legacy and reputation ==
Both during and after his reign, Hamzat Bek's reputation was tarnished by the massacre of the Avar ruling family. However, Hajji Ali, an eyewitness to the Caucasian War, describes Hamzat Bek as "learned and wise, and no one in Daghestan could rival his gallantry." Moshe Gammer argues that Hamzat Bek's importance has been overlooked in both Dagestani and Russian sources, partly because he is "overshadowed" by the other two imams. Gammer stresses the significance of Hamzat Bek's swift succession after Ghazi Muhammad's death in preserving the jihad movement. He also notes the importance of Hamzat Bek's destruction of the Avar khanate, which allowed the imamate to spread its control over all of central Dagestan and made war with the Russians unavoidable. Gammer also suggests that Hamzat Bek was the originator of the administrative structures of the imamate as a state, which were later developed more under Shamil. For example, Hamzat Bek regularly appointed his deputies (na'ibs) to each region under his control, whereas Ghazi Muhammad only appointed deputies as needed. Because of Hamzat Bek's noble origins and reliance on the nobility, Michael Kemper characterizes his reign as "a brief 'aristocratic' interlude between the charismatic leaders Ghāzī-Muḥammad and Shāmil who stood for the interests of the 'free' Avar communities and relied on noblemen only in certain cases."
