= Mugi =

Mugi may refer to:

== Places ==
- Mugi, Ethiopia, the major town of Anfillo
- Mugi, Gifu, a former town in Gifu Prefecture, Japan
- Mugi, Jayawijaya, Indonesia
- Mugi, Republic of Dagestan, a rural locality in Russia
- Mugi, Tokushima, a town in Kaifu District, Japan
- Mugi District, Gifu, a former district in Gifu Prefecture, Japan
- Mugi Line, a railway line in southeastern Tokushima Prefecture, Japan
- Mugi Rekso Abadi, an Indonesian holding company
- Mugi Station, a passenger railway station

== People ==
- Mugi Kadowaki (門脇 麦; born 1992), Japanese actress
- Mugi the Cat, Japanese feline singer-songwriter

== See also ==
- MUGI, a pseudorandom number generator
- Nickname for Tsumugi Kotobuki, a fictional character of K-On!
