= Gebek Janku ibn Muhammad =

Khan of Avaristan

Gebek Janku ibn Muhammad was the Khan (Nutsal) of Avaristan 1801–1802. He was a son of Muhammad ibn Umma. He ascended the throne, but was murdered on the orders of his sister and was succeeded by his father.

Preceded by Umma Khan V	Khan of Avaristan; 1801–1802	Succeeded by Sultan Ahmed Khan of Avar
