= Mehtuli Khanate =

Mehtuli Khanate Kumyk: Mahtulu xanlıq
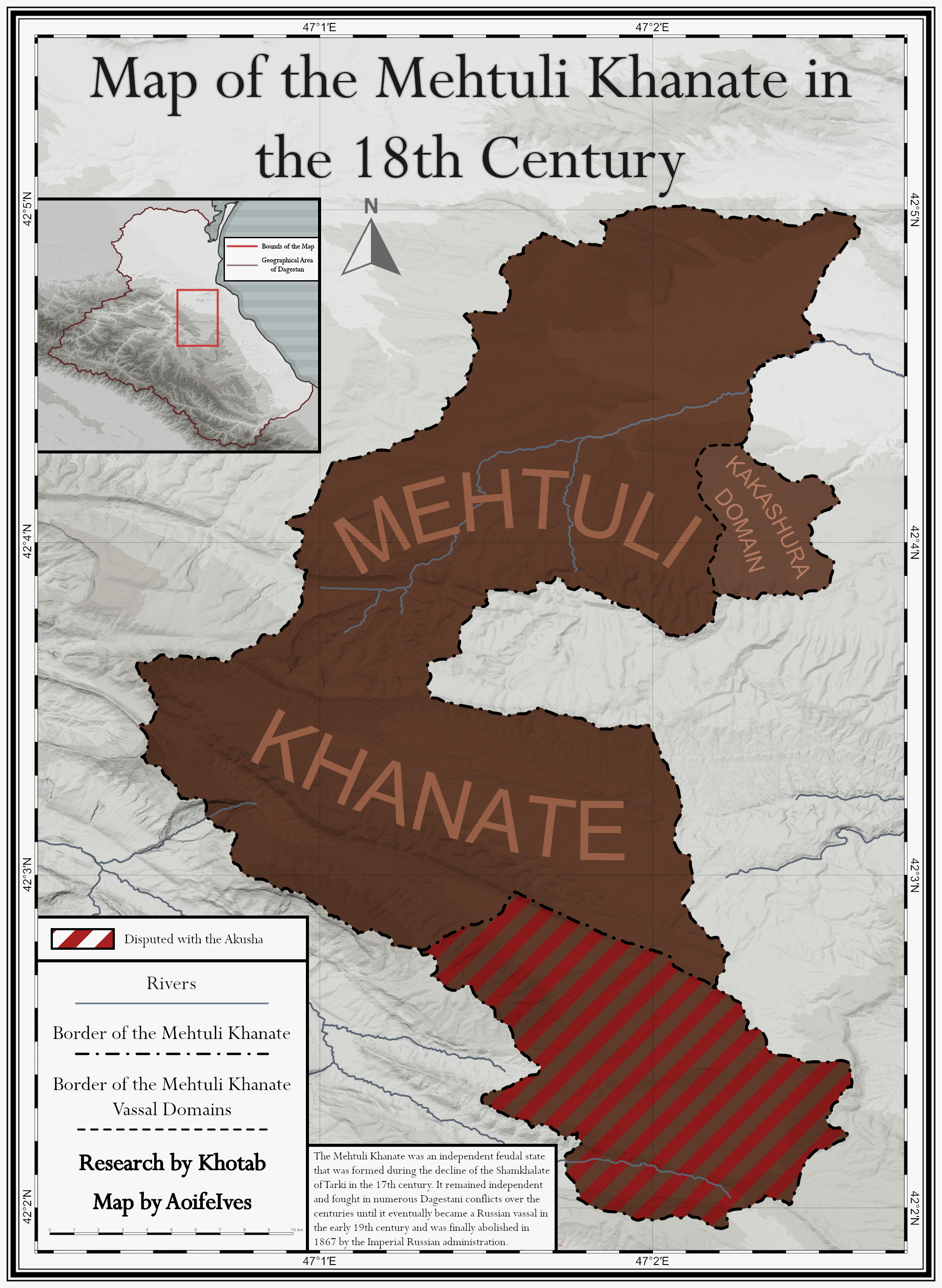
- Map of the Mehtuli Khanate in the 18th century.
- Capital: Töben Cüñütey; Dorgeli
- Religion: Islam
- History
  - Established: c. 1659
  - Disestablished: 1867
Preceded by	Succeeded by
Shamkhalate of Tarki	Temir-Khan-Shurinsky Okrug
- Today part of: Russia

Mehtuli Khanate (Kumyk: Mahtulu xanlıq, Russian: Мехтулинское ханство), or otherwise known as Dzhengutai Khanate (Kumyk: Cüñütey xanlıq) was a Kumyk state in Dagestan that existed in the 17th–19th centuries.

== Population ==
The main population of the state were Kumyks who was headed by a khan. However, the khanate also included Avars and Dargins. It capital was Lower Dzhengutai and composed of 13 auls. Its neighbors included Tarki Shamkhalate to north, Avar Khanate to west and Akusha-Dargo Union to south.

== Establishment ==
The Mehtuli Khanate was formed in the 17th century during the collapse of the Tarki Shamkhalate. Its name comes from the name of its founder, Qara Mehdi, who, according to legend and written sources, came from the house of Shamkhals. The parentage of Qara Mehdi is not known for certain, but according to Russian historian Ekaterina Kusheva, there is a possibility that Chupan Shamkhal (d. 1588) may have been a strong candidate. Qara Mehdi had numerous offsprings, one of his sons was Ahmad Khan. However, in the sources he began to be mentioned only from 1637 as already the ruler of the principality. Ahmad Khan together with the rulers of Endirey participated in various raids on the Cossack fortifications along the Terek.

A descendant of Qara Mehdi, Ahmad II (1735–1747) joined Qaplan I Giray's invasion of Caucasus and fought against Nader Shah's Dagestan campaign and reportedly was instrumental during Battle of Andalal in 1741. Although Ottoman sultan Mahmud I initially appointed him as Shamkhal of Tarki (a claim he put forward through his maternal line) this title was revoked shortly to be given to Khaspulat (1734–1758).

Ali Sultan, the khan of Mehtuli joined alliance with other Dagestani and Caucasian feudal lords against Fath Ali Khan of Quba in 1774. The Dagestani coalition of rulers included Kaitag utsmi Amir Hamza, Umma Khan of Avars, Ghāzī Rustam of Tabasaran, Tishsiz Muhammad (Muhammad the Toothless) – head of Kazanishche Kumyks; they were also joined by the Kumyks of Endirey, Kostek and others. Having gathered a 4,000-strong army, coalition was led by Amir Hamza who marched into Quba but retreated north where he was ambushed by Fatali's armies. Nevertheless, coalition defeated Fath Ali's army of 8,000 in the battle of Gavdushan, near the city of Khudat in July 1774 and forced him to flee to Salyan.

The ruling dynasty of Mehtuli Khanate established links with Avar Khanate when Ali Sultan married his son Sultan Ahmad to Umma Khan's daughter Pakhu Bika. After Umma's death in 1801, his widow Gikhilay (d. 1833) also married Sultan Ahmad. Avars offered the throne of khanate to Sultan Ahmad in 1802, since Umma had no surviving sons and his brother was killed by Gikhilay. After Ali Sultan's death in 1807, Ahmad demanded his patrimony from his elder brother Hasan Khan, who granted him villages of Dorgeli, Kaka-Shura, Paraul and Urum.

Mehduli Khanate came under vassalage of Russian Empire as the result of Russian–Kumyk Wars. Aleksey Petrovich Yermolov led a campaign against Avar Khanate in 1818 and expelled Sultan Ahmad Khan in 1819. Hasan's son Ahmad III soon established himself as ruler Mehtuli until his death. Khanate then came under rulership of Nuh Bike, daughter of Mehdi II of Tarki Shamkhalate. Avar Khanate however was invaded by Hamzat Bek's Murid army who executed Pakhu Bika and his sons in 1834.

Ibrahim Khan, son of Ahmad III was appointed as ruler of Avar Khanate on 4 August [O.S. 23 July] 1843, however due to Imam Shamil's occupation of Avaria this title was only nominal. In 1855 he also became ruler of Mehtuli. He was transferred to Avar Khanate in 1859 and his brother Rashid Khan was appointed as Mehtuli khan instead. However, Avar Khanate was disestablished in 1862 due to inability of Ibrahim Khan to submit remnants of pro-Shamil insurgency. Mehtuli Khanate was also disestablished in 1867 and Rashid Khan (d. 1876) was sent to retirement. Mehtuli Khanate transformed into Dzhengutayevsky uchastok of Temir-Khan-Shurinsky Okrug same year.

== Sources ==
- Butkov, Pyotr Grigoriyevich (1869). Материалы для новой истории Кавказа, с 1722 по 1803 год, ч. I [Materials of the new history of the Caucasus, from 1722 to 1803. Part I] (in Russian). Tiflis: Enfyandjyants and Co.
