= Gotsatl Malyy =

Gotsatl Malyy Гоцатль Малый
- Selo
- Location within Republic of Dagestan Location within Russia
- Coordinates: 42°30′N 46°53′E
- Country: Russia
- Region: Republic of Dagestan
- District: Khunzakhsky District
- Time zone: UTC+3:00

Gotsatl Malyy (Russian: Гоцатль Малый) is a rural locality (a selo) and the administrative center of Gotsatlinsky Selsoviet, Khunzakhsky District, Republic of Dagestan, Russia. Population: 16 (2010 census); 72 (2002 census); 1,658 (1989 Soviet census). There are 2 streets in this selo.

== Geography ==
It is located 16 km from Khunzakh (the district's administrative centre), 72 km from Makhachkala (capital of Dagestan) and 1,658 km from Moscow. Gotsatl Bolshoy is the nearest rural locality.
