= Nader Shah's Dagestan campaign =

Persian Empire campaigns (1741–1743)

Nader's campaigns in Dagestan
- Part of Naderian Wars
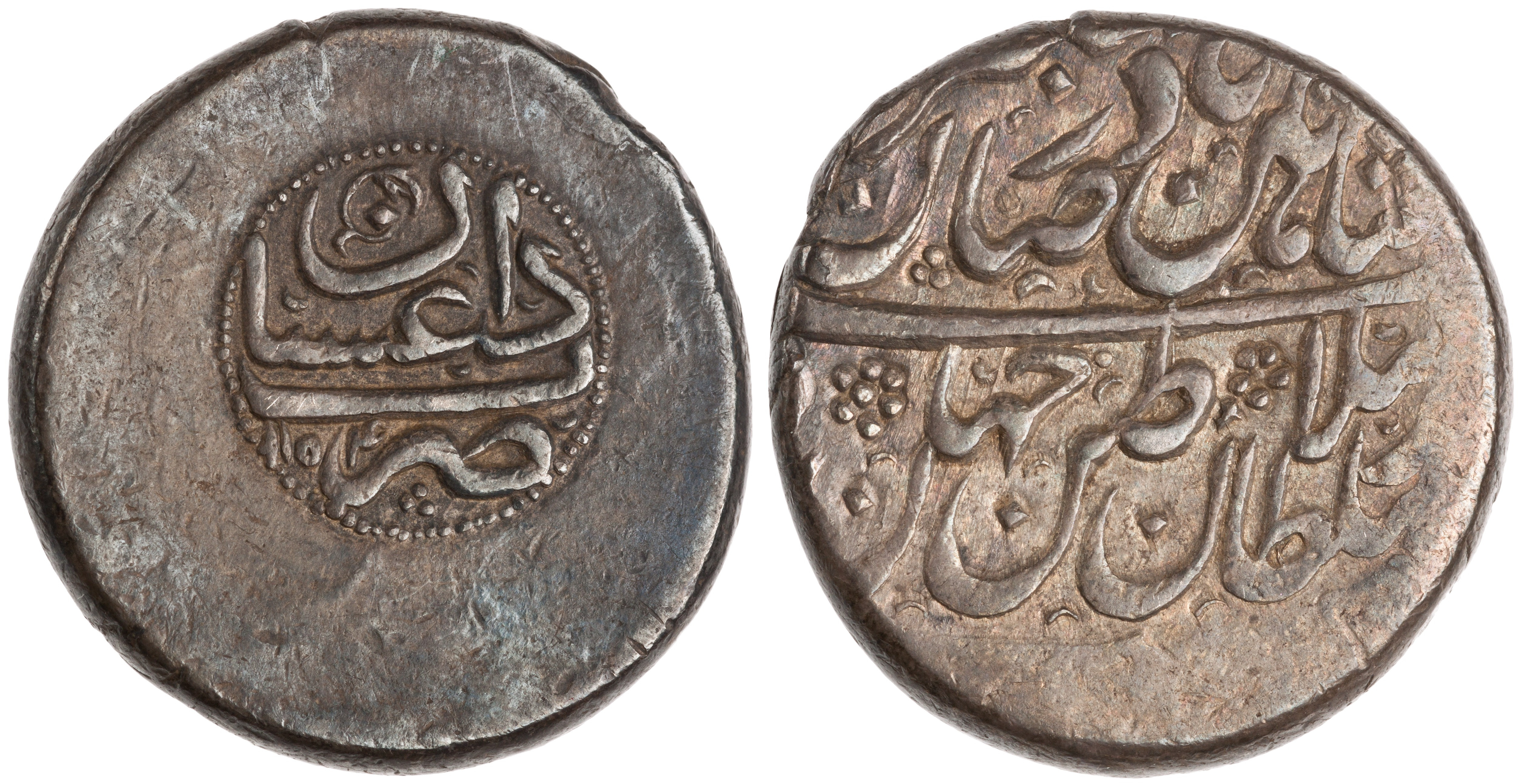
- Silver coin of Nader Shah, minted in Dagestan, dated 1741/2
Date	1741–1745
Location	Dagestan, North Caucasia
Result	North Caucasian victory: Eventual Afsharid withdrawal from the region; Persian Empire fails to annex Dagestan; Nader Shah suffered horrific losses

Belligerents
Afsharid Iran; Numerous clients & vassals	North Caucasians: Lezgin Bekdoms; Avar Khanate; Kaitag Utsmiate; Gazikumukh Khanate; Akusha-Dargo; Elisu Sultanate; Mehtuli Khanate; Shaki Khanate; Principality of Tabasaran

Commanders and leaders
Nader (WIA); Ebrahim Khan Afshar †; Givi Amilakhvari	Surkhay Khan I Murtazaali Khan; Muhammad Khan; Haji Davud; Ali Sultan of Elisu; Ahmed Mekhtuly; Muhammad Khan Avar; Muhammad Murtazali I Rustam Qadi II; Mirza Kalukh †

Strength
Varying; 100,000–150,000 at height: 110,000 soldiers, 40,000 service personnels	Varying; ~50,000 at height

Casualties and losses
100,000+: 82,000 soldiers, large amount of service personnels Only 25,000–27,000 survived according to I. Kalushkin	Low

Nader's Dagestan campaign, were the campaigns conducted by the Persian Empire under its Afsharid ruler Nader Shah between the years 1741 and 1743 in order to fully subjugate the Dagestan region in the North Caucasus Area. The conflict between the Persian Empire & the Lezgins and a myriad of other Caucasian tribes in the north was intermittently fought through the mid-1730s during Nader's first short expedition in the Caucasus until the last years of his reign and assassination in 1747 with minor skirmishes and raids. The incredibly difficult terrain of the northern Caucasus region made the task of subduing the Lezgins an extremely challenging one. Despite this Nader Shah gained numerous strongholds and fortresses from the Dagestanis and pushed them to the very verge of defeat. The Lezgins however held on in the northernmost reaches of Dagestan and continued to defy Persian domination.

The conflict was fought over many years and only included a few years of actual hard fighting, usually when Nader himself was present, but otherwise consisted of skirmishes and raids throughout. The majority of the Persian casualties were from the extremity of the weather as well as the outbreak of disease, all of which combined with the indomitable will of the Lezgins to wage an insurgency and retreat to their distant strongholds when threatened with a pitched battle made the entire war a quagmire for Nader's forces. Ultimately the Lezgins who had held on in the northern fortresses marched south upon hearing of Nader's assassination and reclaimed most of their lost territories as the Persian empire crumbled.

In 1741, an attempt was made on Nāder's life near Darband. When the would-be assassin claimed that he had been recruited by his son Reza Qoli, the shah had his eldest son blinded in retaliation, an act for which he later felt great remorse. Marvi reported that Nāder began to manifest signs of physical deterioration and mental instability. Finally, the shah was forced to reinstate taxes due to insufficient funds, and the heavy levies sparked numerous rebellions.

== Prelude ==
After Nader's successful campaign in 1735 against the Ottomans, he lingered on appointing new governors to his newly acquired cities and kingdoms before setting out against the Lezgians in northern Dagestan. The Tatars who had marched all the way from Crimea, on receiving news of Koprulu Pasha's demise at the Battle of Yeghevārd, turned and hastened back north along the black sea coast. The Lezgians however were determined to fight, especially with the advent of the winter snow in the tight restricted mountain passes of northern Daghestan. The Lezgian leader suffered a crippling defeat in June 1736 and fled to the Avars with many of his subjects making peace with Nader.

In 1739, during Nader Shah's invasion of the Mughal Empire, his brother, Ebrahim Khan Afshar, launched a campaign to subdue the Lezgins in Dagestan. Events initially unfolded very favourably, with the Lezgins being defeated decisively in a pitched battle. However, Ebrahim Khan and a small group of his retainers were ambushed when they were passing through a valley. The Lezgins killed Ebrahim Khan and desecrated his corpse.

== Campaign of 1741 ==
Nader recruited for the occasion 100,000-150,000 soldiers from all parts of Iran, but also Tatars and Uzbeks. Many Dagestani tribes came south to Nader's camp to submit and pay tribute, though others prepared for resistance. The prominent Georgian nobleman Givi Amilakhvari, who was appointed as a governor (wakil) of Kartli for the shah of Iran and reconfirmed as Prince of Saamilakhoro and Duke (eristavi) of Ksani in the same year of 1741, took part in the campaign. Nader first sent 10,000 mounted Tofangchi led by Mir Alam Khan Khazime, Esmail Beig Minbâshi and Zaman Beig Minbâshi Mashhadi to subdue the Lezgins. However, they failed to defeat the 30,000 Lezgin warriors, most of whom were musketeers, and were driven back. Nader then ordered Rahim Khan Uzbek and his troop composed between 10,000 and 11,000 Tofangchi from different tribes to reinforce the engaged Persian troops. Together, they devastated the Lezgin army, killing 5,000 men. The rest of Lezgins took refuge in the mountains.

Nader eventually reached the last fortress of the Lezgins in northern Dagestan and laid siege to it. But because of the early arrival of winter and outbreak of disease as well as the difficult logistical situation Nader chose to withdraw. This could also have been due to Nader's deteriorating health which made the climate more insufferable. Nader's columns was constantly harassed on their way south and Nader could not bring the Lezgins to commit in a set piece battle despite trying to do so numerous times. The Persian army suffered great casualties and many of the tribes which had initially submitted to Persian suzerainty rebelled again. It was during this campaign that an attempted assassination of Nader Shah failed. Suspecting his eldest son, Reza Qoli Mirza, took out his eyes.

== Nader's last campaign ==
After negotiations had broken down with the Istanbul, Nader declared war against the Ottomans and invaded Mesopotamia again. However, because of the lengthy siege of Mosul and numerous rebellions throughout the interior of Persia the campaign was indecisive and Nader withdrew after coming to terms with the Ottoman negotiators. Later he launched another campaign in Dagestan. The tribes refused to be drawn into any set piece battles as they again took to the hills and forests in the mountainous terrain of the north Caucasus. Nader's invasion made even less progress this time around and no conclusive result came of this last expedition in Dagestan. This expedition was notorious for its bloodthirsty nature with many villages and towns razed to the ground and their inhabitants slain or enslaved.

== Folklore ==
Nader Shah's ultimately failed attempts at annexing Dagestan became a source for legends, myths and folk-tales amongst the people of the north Caucasus. The Avar epic Srazhenie s Nadir Shakhom, (The battle with Nāder Shah), and the Lak Pesnya o geroe Murtazaali, (Epic of the hero Mortażā ʿAlī), provide a vivid and colourful picture of the triumph over “the scourge of the universe.” These works represent the pinnacle of the Dāḡestānī epic genre; their significance to the mountain peoples “can be compared to that of Slovo o polku Igoreve (The lay of the army of Igor) in Russian epic poetry”.

== See also ==
- Iran Kharab
- Lezgin people
- Avars (Caucasus)
- Napoleon's invasion of Russia

== Sources ==
- Michael Axworthy. "Sword of Persia: Nader Shah, from Tribal Warrior to Conquering Tyrant" p 146, 145, pp 234–238
- Musaev, Makhach Abdulaevich (2022). "The Strength and Losses of Nadir Shah's Army in the Dagestan Campaign of 1741-1743". History, Archeology and Ethnography of the Caucasus (in English and Russian). 18 (4).
