= Iran Kharab =

Iran Kharab ("Ruin of Iran") was a fortified camp in Dagestan (present-day Russia) founded by Iranian ruler Nader Shah (r. 1736−1747) in July 1742. It was located to the northwest of Derbent, a little inland from the Caspian Sea coast, and was founded in order to provide for a secure base against constant raids during his difficult campaign in Dagestan. According to the modern historian Michael Axworthy, Nader's bitter decision to name the camp "Ruin of Iran" was "hardly encouraging for his troops". Reflecting on the difficulties which Nader encountered during his campaign, Axworthy notes that the irony of the name had taken a dreadful twist, proving itself "truer than Nader could have imagined".

Nader had his son Reza Qoli Mirza blinded at Iran Kharab.

== Sources ==
- Axworthy, Michael (2006). The Sword of Persia: Nader Shah, from Tribal Warrior to Conquering Tyrant. I.B.Tauris. ISBN 978-1850437062.
