= Haydarbek Genichutlinsky =

- Born: 1829; Giničukḷ, Avar Khanate
- Died: 1883 (aged 53–54); Arabia, Ottoman Empire

Haydarbek Genichutlinsky (Russian: Хайдарбек Геничутлинский, Avar: Хайдарбек аль-Гиничуки; 1829-1883) or Gaidarbek Genichutlinsky was an Avar theologian, poet and historian.

== Biography ==
Haydarbek was born in 1829 in the village of Genichutl (Avar: Геничутль, romanized: Giničukḷ) in the family of the Avar nobleman Umar-Hajji b. Hamza. Haydarbek had two brothers: Bats-Akhmad and Hamza, an Arabic-language clerk of the Avar Khanate. Like his brother, Hamza was an outstanding expert in the traditional circle of Arab-Muslim sciences. Fazu Aliyeva, Avar human rights activist is a descendant of Hamza.

Haydarbek was married to a daughter of Inkvachilav Dibir, Imam Shamil's naib over Avaria. She was also the aunt of Maksud Alikhanov. He died in 1883 while on Hajj, in the Ottoman Empire.

== Works ==
Genichutlinsky wrote in Arabic rhymed prose. His essays are works divided into chapters with a chronicle plot. They include:

- The Beauty of the Islamic Religion - a compilation of Caucasian Imams
- Nutsal Umma-Khan the Great - a biography of Umma Khan V
- Commemorative records - a chronology of certain events in Dagestan
- About the uprising of 1877 in Dagestan

He narrated on the basis of oral traditions and various manuscripts of local origin. He also described events that he himself witnessed. Translations of his essays from Arabic into Russian were published in 1992 in a collection called "Historical, biographical and historical essays" (Russian: Историко-биографические и исторические очерки).
