= Gotsatl Bolshoy =

Gotsatl Bolshoy Гоцатль Большой
- Selo
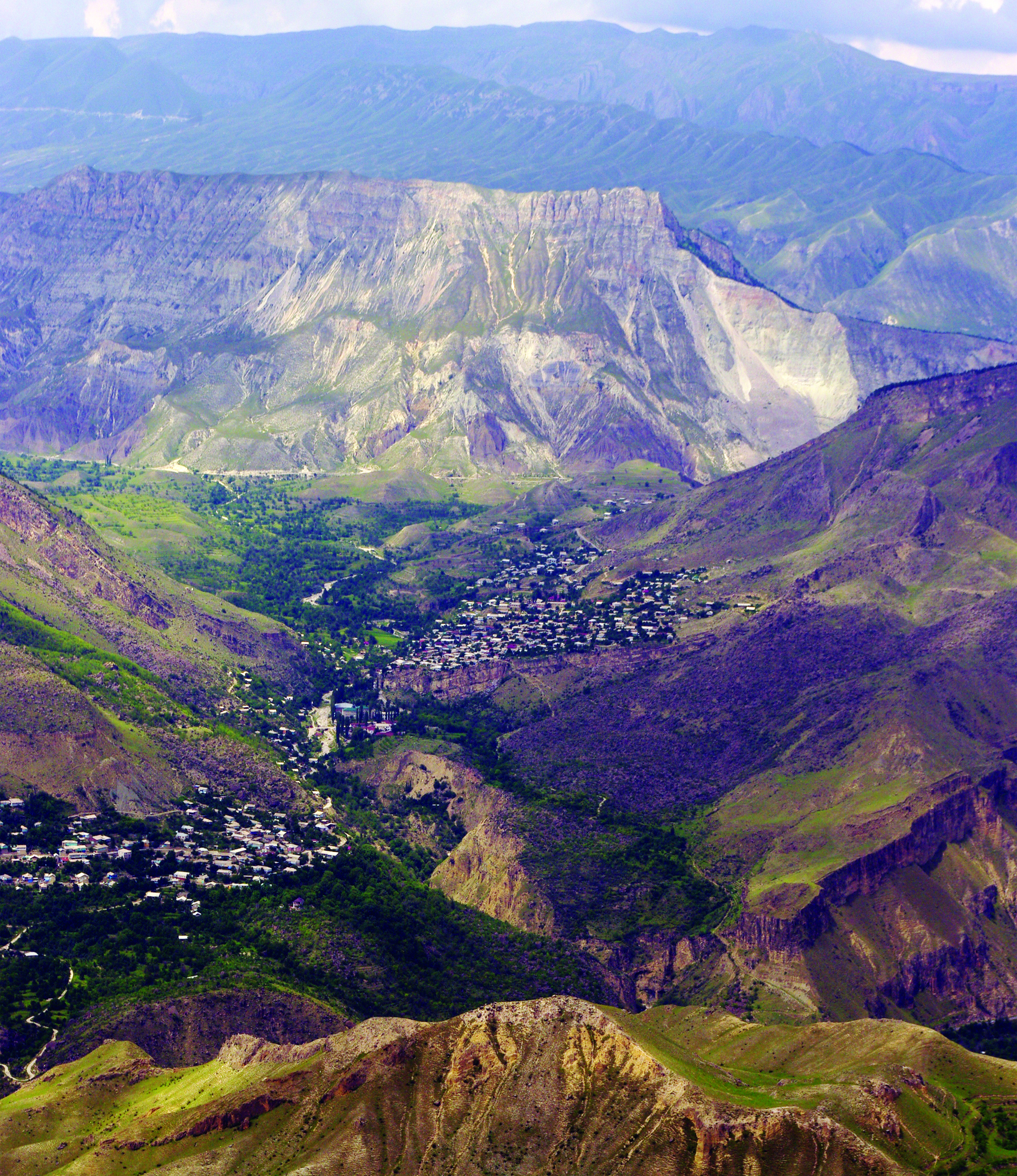

- Location within Republic of Dagestan Location within Russia
- Coordinates: 42°31′N 46°52′E
- Country: Russia
- Region: Republic of Dagestan
- District: Khunzakhsky District
- Time zone: UTC+3:00

Gotsatl Bolshoy (Russian: Гоцатль Большой) is a rural locality (a selo) and the administrative center of Gotsatlinsky Selsoviet, Khunzakhsky District, Republic of Dagestan, Russia. Population: 2,188 (2010 census); There are 5 streets in this selo.

== Geography ==
It is located 15 km from Khunzakh (the district's administrative centre), 71 km from Makhachkala (capital of Dagestan) and 1,656 km from Moscow. Gotsatl Malyy is the nearest rural locality.
