= Dorgeli =

Dorgeli Доргели Дургели
- Selo
- Location within Republic of Dagestan Location within Russia
- Coordinates: 42°39′N 47°17′E
- Country: Russia
- Region: Republic of Dagestan
- District: Karabudakhkentsky District
- Time zone: UTC+3:00

Dorgeli (Russian: Доргели; Kumyk: Дургели, Durgeli) is a rural locality (a selo) in Karabudakhkentsky District, Republic of Dagestan, Russia. The population was 5,783 as of 2010. There are 24 streets. Dorgeli is located 30 km southwest of Karabudakhkent (the district's administrative centre) by road. Chankurbe and Chabanmakhi are the nearest rural localities. Kumyks live there.
