= Withdrawal through Andalal (1741) =

Withdrawal by the Persian army under Nader Shah in 1741

- Part of the Nader Shah's Dagestan campaign
Date	September 1741
Location	Andalal, Dagestan
Result	Persian withdrawal harried, causing heavy casualties

Belligerents
Lak Khanate; Mehtuli Khanate; Avar Khanate; Lezgin Malikates	Persian Empire

Commanders and leaders
Murtazali-Khan; Ahmed-Khan Mekhtuly; Kadi Pir Magomed	Nader Shah (AWOL); Lutf Ali Khan; Haydar Bek

Strength
Unknown, presumably numerically inferior	Unknown

Casualties and losses
Unknown	30,000 men 33,000 camel and horses 79 guns

The withdrawal of Andalal by the Persian army under Nader Shah took place after he broke off the siege of the last Lezgian fortress in order to return to Derbent for winter quarters. His withdrawal came under heavy raids by the Lezgians. However, there is no mention of any pitched battle around Andalal, or anywhere else during the withdrawal, in any of the primary or secondary material in the established historiography of Nader's Campaigns.

== The Withdrawal ==
The withdrawal took place in Andalal; the mountainous part of Avaria. The previous years and months during Nader's Dagestan campaign had been bloody years with firm resistance offered by the Lezgins, Tabasarans, Avars, Kumyks, and others, as well as the relentless counter-attacks by Nader Shah due to this, whose campaigning in Dagestan was a devastating one to everyone. However, by September 1741, all of Dagestan – except several Avar territories – had fallen under Persian hegemony. Nader decided to attack from two flanks; at Andalal and Avaria, through the Aimakin Gorge. As commented by English historian L. Lockhart;

"With the Avars remaining unconquered, the key to all of Dagestan remains out of reach of Nader Shah."

The terrible danger looming over Avaria rallied Avar society. An important Avar leader, Qadi Pir Muhammad, sent a message of support to all societies. Religious leader Ibrahim Haji Andalan Gidatlinsky twice before turned to the Shah of Persia, trying to persuade him not to conduct an unnecessary war with the Avar Muslims. Moreover, by Nadir Shah, according to legend, they were sent letters and legates from Andalal. Following the rejection by Nader, Qadi Pir Muhammad replied: "Now, between us can not be peace. As long as our mind is not going blur, we will fight and destroy the invading enemy."

Avars threw rocks from above the mountain at the troops who were passing by. In September 1741 there was an ambush in Aymakinskom gorge. Here the contingents under Lutf Ali Khan and Haydar-Bek were utterly defeated. From the 4,000-strong detachment, Haidar Bek led, only 500 people survived. And from the 6,000-strong detachment, only 600 survived. The winners won much booty: 19 guns, much ammo, and all the baggage. Following the retreat, the Persian army extricated through Kumukh, Khorsekh, Tchyrag, Richa, Kurakh, and eventually to the Iranian town of Derbent.

== Historiography of the conflict ==
There is no mention of a set-piece battle fought in the vicinity of Andalal in any of the primary sources, nor is there any reference to such an engagement in any of the secondary source material focusing on the subject of Nader's Campaigns.

There are however well established accounts of the withdrawing Persian columns coming under constant harrying by the Lezgis and their allies. The Lezgis who refused to commit to any set piece battles, repeatedly harassed the withdrawing Persian army, making Andalal a "calamitous region" for Nader Shah's forces as they suffered from a combination of terrible weather conditions, strained logistics, outbreaks of disease and ceaseless harassment by Lezgi skirmishers.

Nader Shah's ultimately failed attempts at annexing Dagestan became a source for legends, myths, and folk-tales amongst the people of the North Caucasus. The Avar epic Srazhenie s Nadir Shakhom, (The battle with Nāder Shah), and the Lak Pesnya o geroe Murtazaali, (Epic of the hero Mortażā ʿAlī), provide a vivid and colourful picture of the triumph over "the scourge of the universe." These works represent the pinnacle of the Dāḡestānī epic genre; their significance to the mountain peoples "can be compared to that of Slovo o polku Igoreve (The lay of the army of Igor) in Russian epic poetry". And the Kumyks, in turn, preserve the memory of their hero Akhmed-khan Mekhtuly, who made one of the most dominant roles in the defeat of the troops in Andalal.

== See also ==
- Nader's Dagestan campaign
- Lezgian people
- Avar Khanate
