= Mugi, Republic of Dagestan =

Mugi Муги МухIи
- Selo
- Location within Republic of Dagestan Location within Russia
- Coordinates: 42°17′N 47°25′E
- Country: Russia
- Region: Republic of Dagestan
- District: Akushinsky District
- Time zone: UTC+3:00

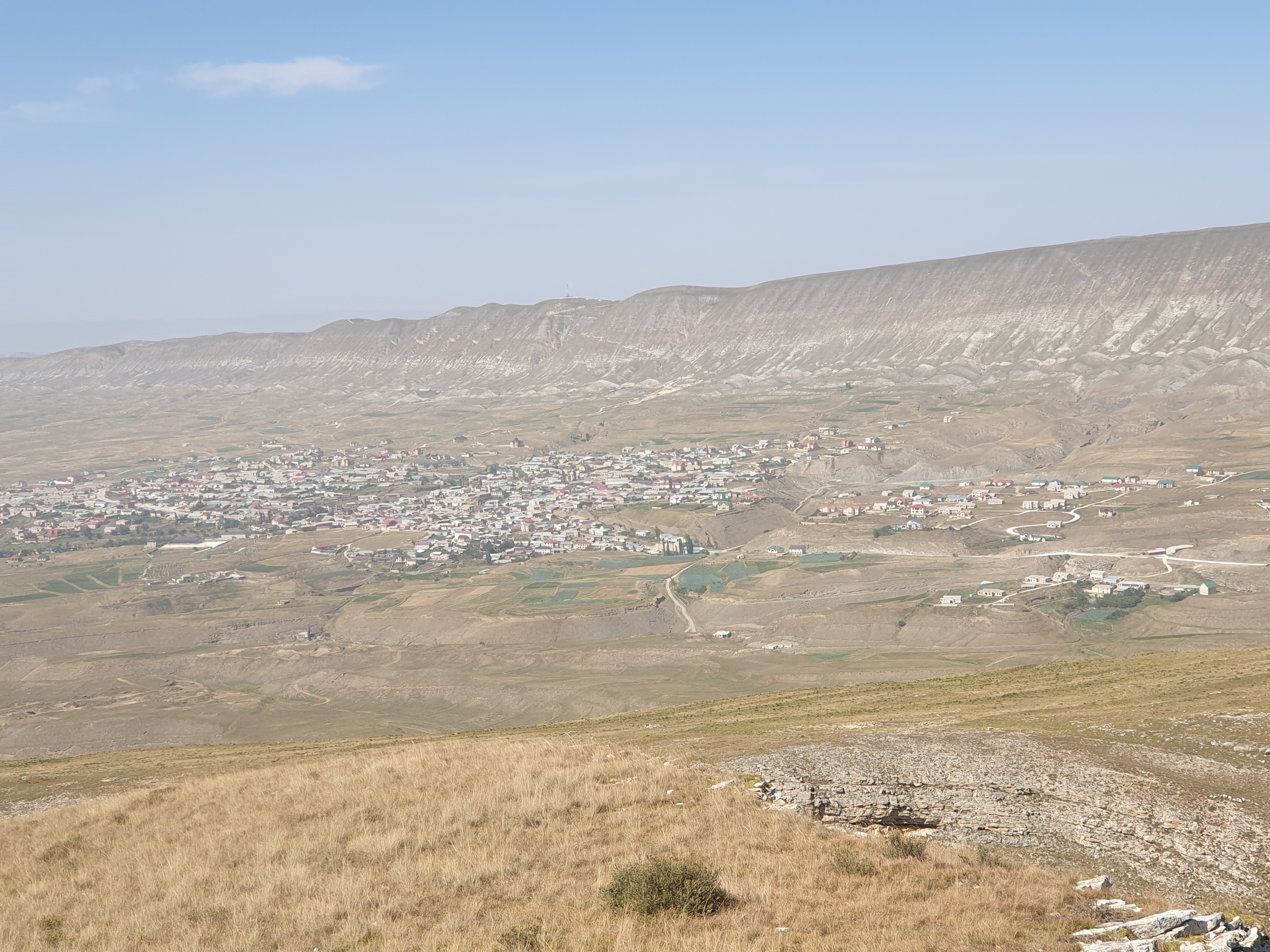
Mugi village

Mugi (Russian: Муги; Dargwa: МухIи) is a rural locality (a selo) in Akushinsky District, Republic of Dagestan, Russia. The population was 3,372 as of 2010. There are 11 streets.

== Geography ==
Mugi is located 11 km northeast of Akusha (the district's administrative centre) by road. Zilmukmakhi is the nearest rural locality.
