= Paraul, Republic of Dagestan =

Paraul Параул Пари-авул
- Selo
- Location within Republic of Dagestan Location within Russia
- Coordinates: 42°44′N 47°21′E
- Country: Russia
- Region: Republic of Dagestan
- District: Karabudakhkentsky District
- Time zone: UTC+3:00

Paraul (Russian: Параул; Kumyk: Пари-авул, Pari-avul) is a rural locality (a selo) in Karabudakhkentsky District, Republic of Dagestan, Russia. The population was 4,949 as of 2010. There are 66 streets.

== Geography ==
Paraul is located 90 km northwest of Novokayakent (the district's administrative centre) by road. Karabudakhkent and Buynaksk are the nearest rural localities.
