= Akusha-Dargo Union =

Historical union of Dargins

- 12th century–1864
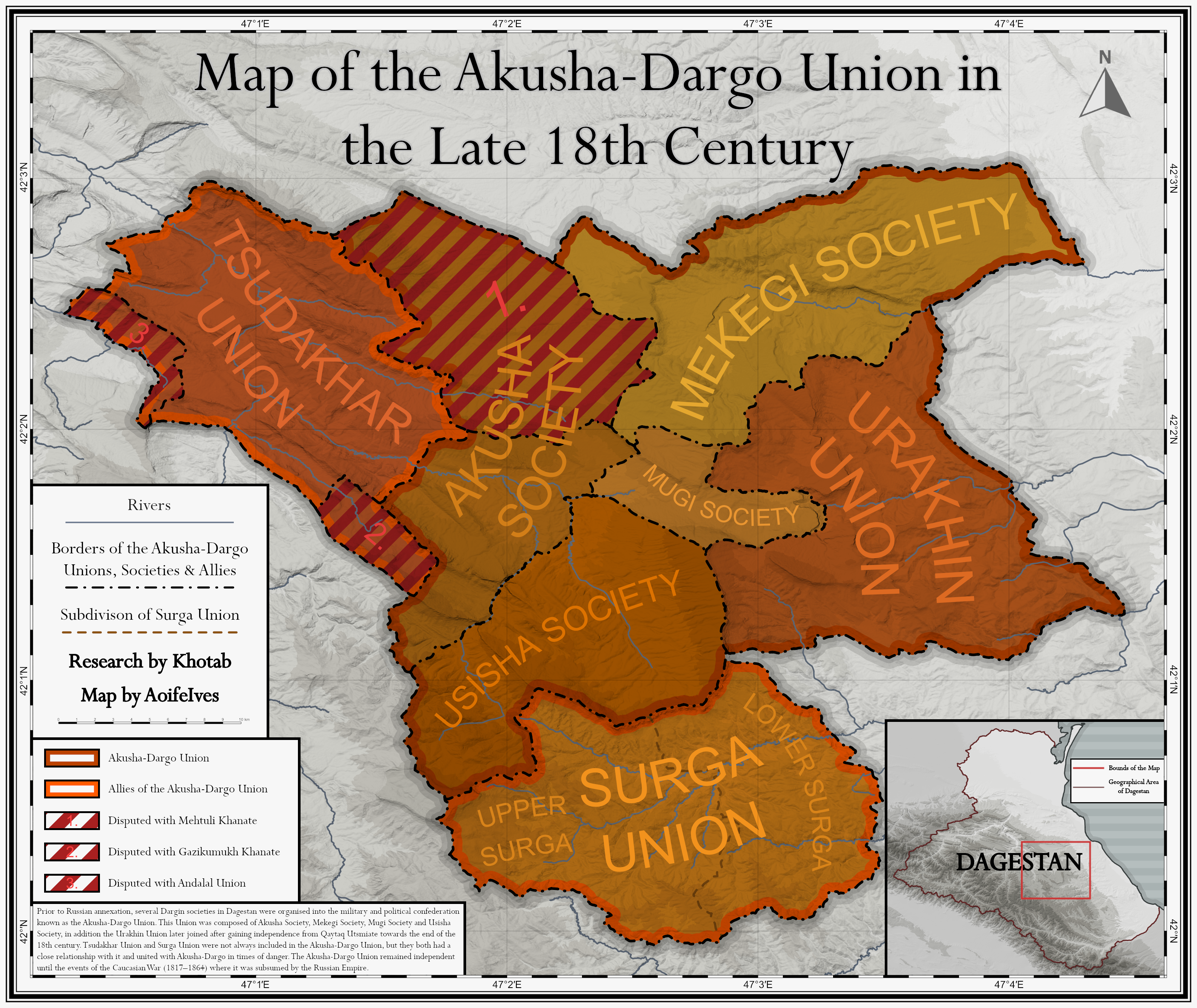
- Akusha-Dargo union in the late 18th century
- Capital: Akusha
- Largest Villages: Tsudakhar, Mugi, Mekegi
- Demonyms: Dargins, Akushans
- Government: Theocracy
- Establishment: 12th century
- History
  - Established: 12th century
  - Disestablished: 1864
Preceded by	Succeeded by
Sarir	Darginsky Okrug
- Today part of: Russia

Akusha-Dargo Union (Russian: Акуша-Дарго) was the union of free Dargin societies centered in the village of Akusha. It included the territories of the current Levashinsky and Akushinsky districts of Dagestan.
