= Shamkhal (title) =

Historical title used for the rulers of Kumyk people in Dagestan

Shamkhal, or Shawhal (Kumyk: Şawxal) is a title used by Kumyk rulers in Dagestan and the Northeast Caucasus during the 8th–19th centuries. By the 16th century, the state had its capital at Tarki and was thus known as the Shamkhalate of Tarki.

== Origins ==
=== Arabic version ===
According to historians V. V. Bartold and M. A. Polievktov, the title shamkhal might come from the name of the ruler Shakhbal appointed by Arabs in Kumukh. According to the anonymous chronicle Darbandnamah, a brother of caliph Hisham ibn Abd al-Malik, named Moslim, commander of the Muslim forces in Dagestan, capturing Kumukh appointed Shakhbal as its governor. In Tarih-Dagistan, the name shamkhal refers to the name of the first appointee of Arabs in Kumukh, in the mountainous Dagestan.

V. Bartold also stated, that the term "Shamkhal" is a later form of the original form Shawkhal, which is mentioned both in the Russian and Persian (Nizam al-Din Shami and Sharaf al-Din Ali Yazdi) sources. Dagestani historian Shikhsaidov wrote that the version claiming Arab descent was in favor of the dynasty and clerics (the descendants of Muhammad). A. Kandaurov wrote that the Arab version was elaborated by the Shamkhals themselves. Also, the title Shamkhals is not mentioned in the works of the Medieval Arabic historians and geographers.

=== Turkic version ===
Among the supporters of Turkic version of the creation of the Shamkhalian state is Lak historian Ali al-Ghumuqi:

Shamkhal wasn't a descendant of Abbas Hamza but a Turk, who came with his companions. After him the Shamkhalate became a hereditary state.

Also it was supported by the historian Fahrettin Kirzioglu, the early 20th century historian D. H. Mamaev, Halim Gerey Sultan, Mehmet-Efendi, and others. Dagestanian historian R. Magomedov stated that:

there is all necessary proofs to relate the term to the Golden Horde, but not to the Arabs. We may think that in the period of the Mongol-Tatars they put a Kumyk ruler in that status [Shamkhal].

Russian professor of oriental studies, the Doctor of Historical Sciences I. Zaytsev, also shared the opinion that the Shamkhalate was a Kumyk state with the capital in the town of Kumuk (written thus in medieval sources). While studying works of the Timurid historians Nizam al-Din Shami and Sharaf al-Din Ali Yazdi, Soviet historians V. Romaskevich and S. Volin, and Uzbek historian Ashraf Ahmedov, as well as professor in Alan studies O. Bubenok, call Gazi-Kumuk (also Gazi-Kumukluk in medieval sources) call the Shamkhalate area as the lands of Kumyks.

Ottoman traveler Evliya Çelebi called the Shamkhal "a natural Oghuz". One of the arguments of the Turkic version is that Shamkhals were elected in the way that is traditional for Turkic peoples — tossing a red apple. Ancient pre-Muslim names of the Kumuk [today Kumukh] inhabitants, as fixed in Khuduk inscription — Budulay, Ahsuwar, Chupan and others — are of Turkic origin. On the graves of the Shamkhals in Kumukh there are Turkic inscriptions, as noted by professor of Caucasian studies L. Lavrov. The grave itself was called by the locals "Semerdalian" after the Khazar city of Semender; the gravestones there are patterned in a Kipchak style. In the "Maza chronicle" Shamkhals are described as "a branch of the Khan-Hakhan generations". Nizam al-Din Shami in his XIV century Timurid chronicle The Book of Triumph and Sheref ad-din Yezdi mentioned the land as Gazi-Kumukluk, where the suffix "luk" suffi is a Turkic linguistic sign.

The ruler of Andi people Ali-Beg, who founded a new ruling dynasty, also had a title of "Shamkhal". According to the local story, starting from Ali-Beg until Khadjik, the rulers of their land spoke in the "language of the plains", i.e. Kumyk.

Jamalutdin-haji Mamaev in the beginning of the 20th century wrote:

The fact that the ruler in Dagestan was chosen from the Chinghiz dynasty and called shawkhal-khan [sic], derived from the Turkic, Tatar spiritual tradition, as a reliance on their genealogical ancestry (nasab), not paying attention to the science or courtesies (edeb). The house of Chinghiz is highly esteemed amongst them (shawkhals), as Quraysh amongst Muslims. They didn't allow someone to stand higher than them or lift heads.

According to French historian Chantal Lemercier-Quelquejay, Shamkhalate was dominated by the Turkic Kumyks, and the Lak people hold the honorable title of Gazis (because of the earlier adoption of Islam). Apart from that, the Shamkhalate had a feudal class of Karachi-beks, a title exclusively related to Mongol-Turkic states. Piano Karpini mentioned from his travels that Khazaria and Lak, even before falling in the hands of the "Western Tatars", belonged to the Cumans.:

The first King of the Western Tatars was Sain. He was strong and mighty. He conquered Russia, Comania, Alania, Lak, Mengiar, Gugia and Khazaria, and before his conquest, they all belonged to Comans.

Vasily Bartold also stated that the Arabic version is a compilation by local historians trying to merge legends with history. The original population of the "Kazi-Kumykskiy" possession, as wrote F. Somonovich in 1796, were Dagestan Tatars (Kumyks). After the resettlement of some Lezginian peoples from Gilan province if Persia, under the rule of Shamkhal, the population mixed, and the power of Shamkhal decreased, and the new population formed their own Khanate independent of the Shamkhal dynasty:

The people of this province come from Dagestan Tatars, mixed with the Persian settlers; they follow the same [religious] law, and speak [one of the] Lezginian languages.

and

As some Persian sources say, this people settled here under the Abumuselim shah, from the Gilan Province and served under the cleric official kazi, under the rule of Shamkhal. Because of that cleric and the people of Kumukh place, who resettled here from Gilan, or, better said, by the mixture with the indigenous Kumukh people, who originate from Dagestan Tatars, the name Kazikumuk emerged. This clerics were the ancestors of Khamutay [contemporary Khan of Kazikumukh], who following the example of others claimed in their parts independence and in the present times adopted the Khan title.

== See also ==
- Kazikumukh Shamkhalate
- Shamkhalate of Tarki
- Dagestan
