= Amuzgi–Shiri language =

Northeast Caucasian language in Dagestan, Russia

Amuzgi-Shiri
- Amuzgu-Shiri
- Native to: North Caucasus
- Region: Dagestan
- Native speakers: (undated figure of 1,500-2,000)
- Language family: Northeast Caucasian: Dargin; Southern; Amuzgi-Shiri
- Dialects: Amuzgi; Shiri

Language codes
- ISO 639-3: None (mis)
- Glottolog: sirz1237
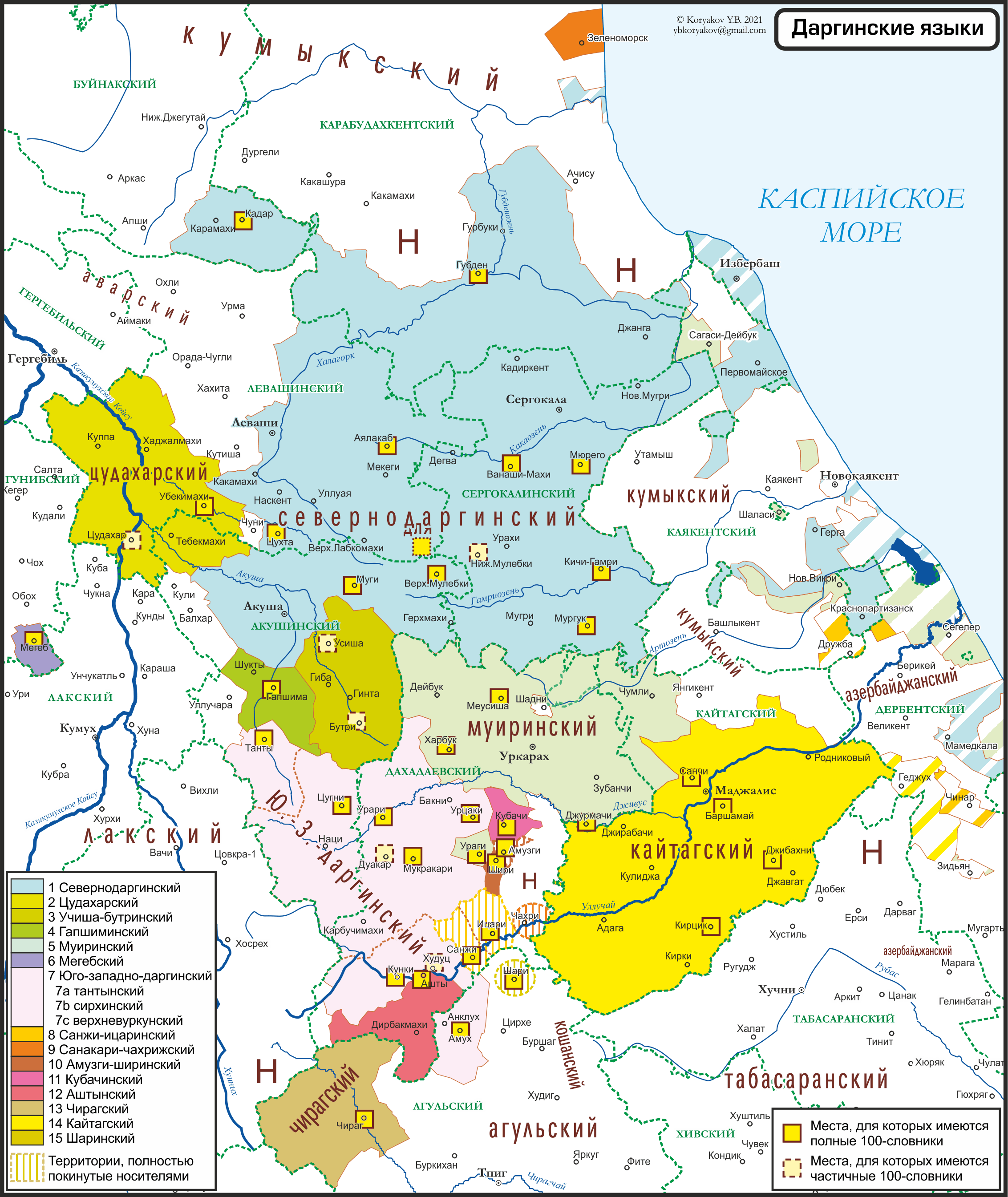
- Amuzgi-Shiri

Amuzgi-Shiri is one of the Dargin languages, spoken in the central part of Dagestan, mainly in the villages of Amuzgi and Shari in the Dakhadayevsky District. It is an unwritten and poorly studied idiom, traditionally attributed to the Dargin language group, but possessing significant lexical and grammatical differences that allow it to be distinguished as a separate language.

== Classification ==
The status of Amuzgi-Shiri as a language or dialect remains controversial. Some classifications treat it as a dialect of Dargin, while others consider it an independent language within the Dargin branch.

== Speakers ==
The number of native speakers is estimated at between 1,500 and 3,000 people. The language is unwritten, but is used in everyday communication; Dargwa, based on the Aqusha, predominates in writing and education.

== Documentation ==
Amuzgi-Shiri was first identified as a distinct language thanks to the work of Oleg Belyaev. Previously, Amuzgi-Shiri and Ashti-Kubachi were considered varieties of the same idiom, but significant structural and lexical differences were later identified between them, which allowed them to be identified as separate linguistic entities within the Dargin group.

== Phonology ==
The presence of special guttural consonants and phonemes with pharyngealization, which are absent in literary Dargin. Differences in tone and intensity in long vowels (affects the semantic load).

== Morphology ==
A verb conjugation system different from Dargin. Own paradigm of possessive forms. Ergative declension in a noun phrase with unique locative indicators.

== Vocabulary ==
There are a significant number of lexemes that do not coincide with other Dargin idioms, as well as traces of borrowings from Kumyk and Persian.
