= Megeb =

Megeb Мегеб Мия МехӀвела
- Selo
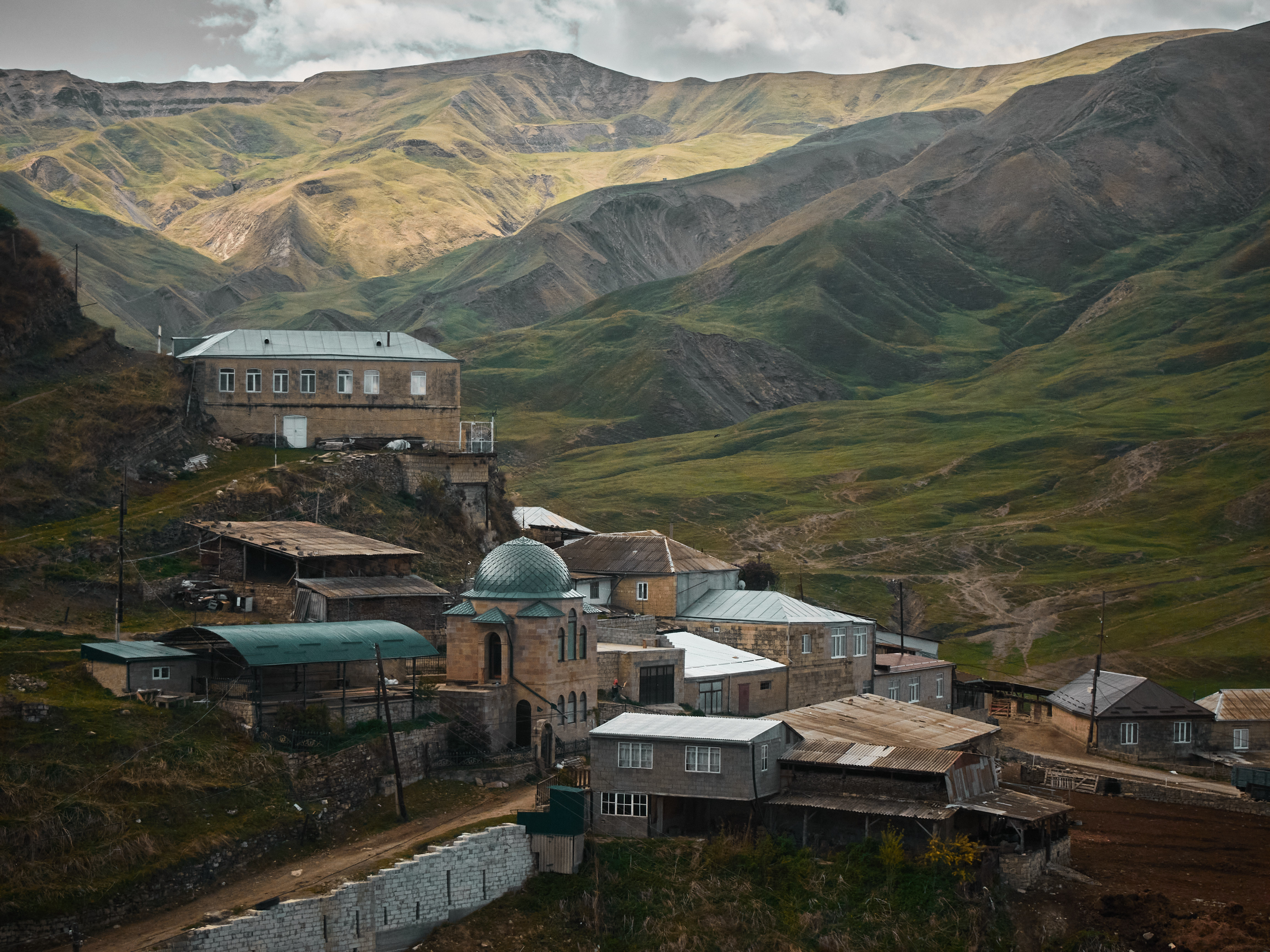

- Location within Republic of Dagestan Location within Russia
- Coordinates: 42°15′N 47°02′E
- Country: Russia
- Region: Republic of Dagestan
- District: Gunibsky District

Population (2010)
  - Total: 700
- Time zone: UTC+3:00

Megeb (Russian: Мегеб; Dargwa: Мия МехӀвела) is a rural locality (a selo) in Gunibsky District, Republic of Dagestan, Russia. The population was 700 as of 2010.

The village is home to an isolated Dargin language, Mehweb.

== Geography ==
Megeb is located 28 km southeast of Gunib (the district's administrative centre) by road. Shangoda and Sogratl are the nearest rural localities.
