= Ashti language =

Northeast Caucasian language or dialect in Dagestan, Russia

Ashti
- Ashty
- иштӀан гъай
- Native to: North Caucasus
- Region: Dagestan
- Native speakers: 600 (2010)
- Language family: Northeast Caucasian: Dargin; Southern; Ashti-Kubachi; Ashti
- Writing system: Cyrillic script

Language codes
- ISO 639-3: None (mis)
- Glottolog: None
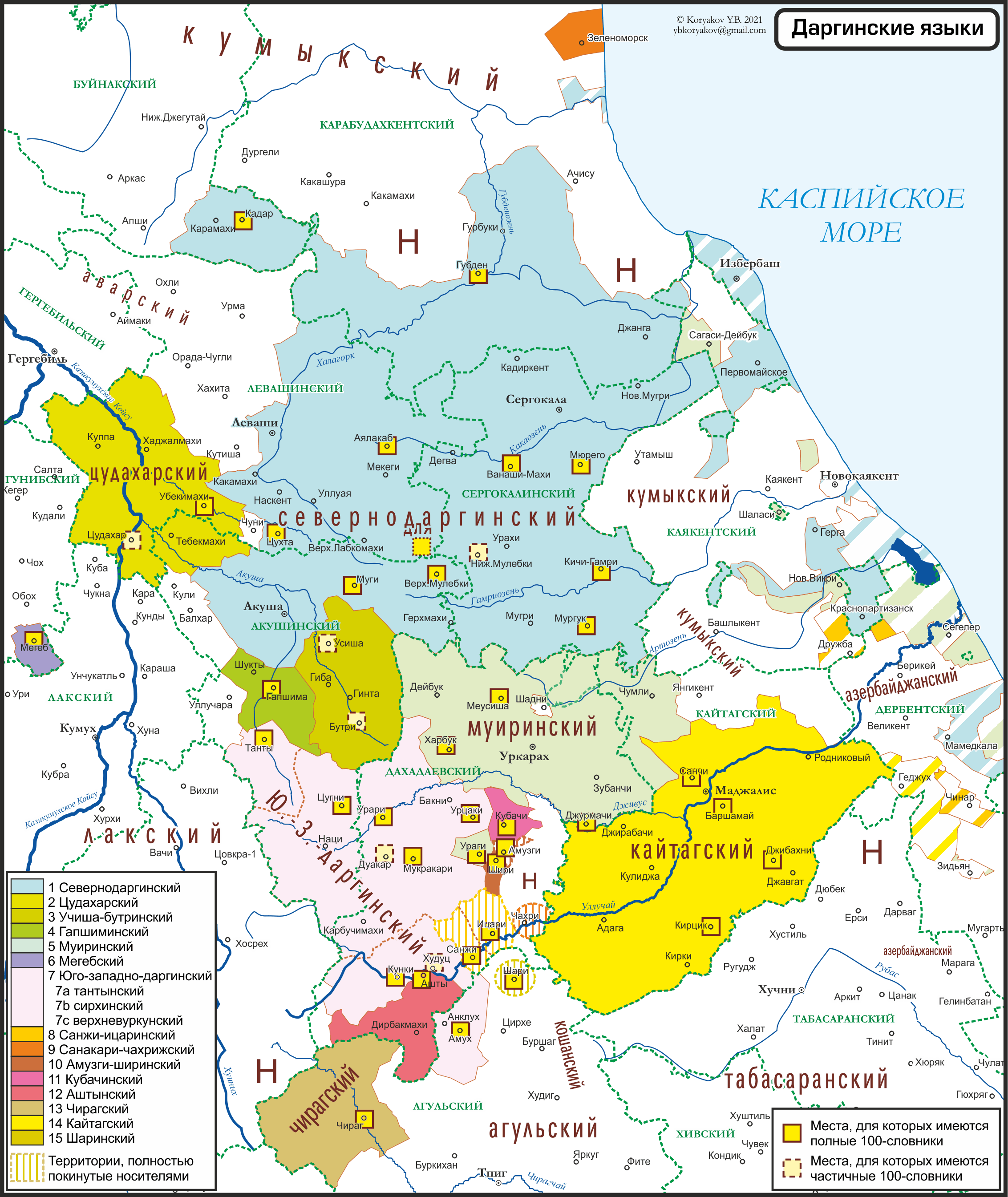
- Ashti

Ashti (Ashti: иштӀан гъай) is a language or dialect that belongs to the Ashti-Kubachi group of the Dargin languages of the Northeast Caucasian language family. It is spoken in the villages of Ashty and Dirbakmakhi in the south of the Dakhadayevsky District of Dagestan. In 2010, the population was estimated at 600 people, some of whom migrated to the plain.

Despite the proximity of neighbouring villages of Kunki and Khuduts, their inhabitants and the inhabitants of Ashty speak different languages. It is believed that in the 13th-14th centuries, some of the inhabitants moved from the village of Anchibchi, located in the area of the present-day village of Kubachi and founded Ashty. This explains the similarity of the Kubachi and Ashty languages.

However, the separation of Kubachi and Ashty, according to lexical statistics, should have occurred even earlier: more than a thousand years ago. And about 100 years ago, the ancestors of the current inhabitants of Dirbakmakha moved from Ashty; there are no significant differences between the speech of the villages of Ashty and Dirbakmakha.

Traditionally, the Kubachi language was considered a dialect of the Dargin language, and Ashty a subdialect of the Kubachi dialect. Modern researchers consider the Ashty language to be a dialect of Kubachi or even a separate language related to Kubachi. Kubachi and Ashty are not entirely mutually intelligible, with a shared vocabulary of approximately 89%.
