= North Dargwa language =

Dargin language

North Dargwa
- дарган мез (literary Dargwa)
- Native to: Russia
- Region: Dagestan
- Ethnicity: Dargwa people
- Native speakers: 133,000 in traditional areas (2010)
- Language family: Northeast Caucasian: Dargin; North-Central; North Dargwa
- Standard forms: Literary Dargwa
- Dialects: Aqusha; Urakhi; Upper Mulebki; Murego-Gubden; Mugi; Kadar
- Writing system: Cyrillic

Language codes
- ISO 639-2: dar (literary Dargwa only)
- ISO 639-3: dar (literary Dargwa only)
- Glottolog: nucl1774 Nuclear North Dargwa
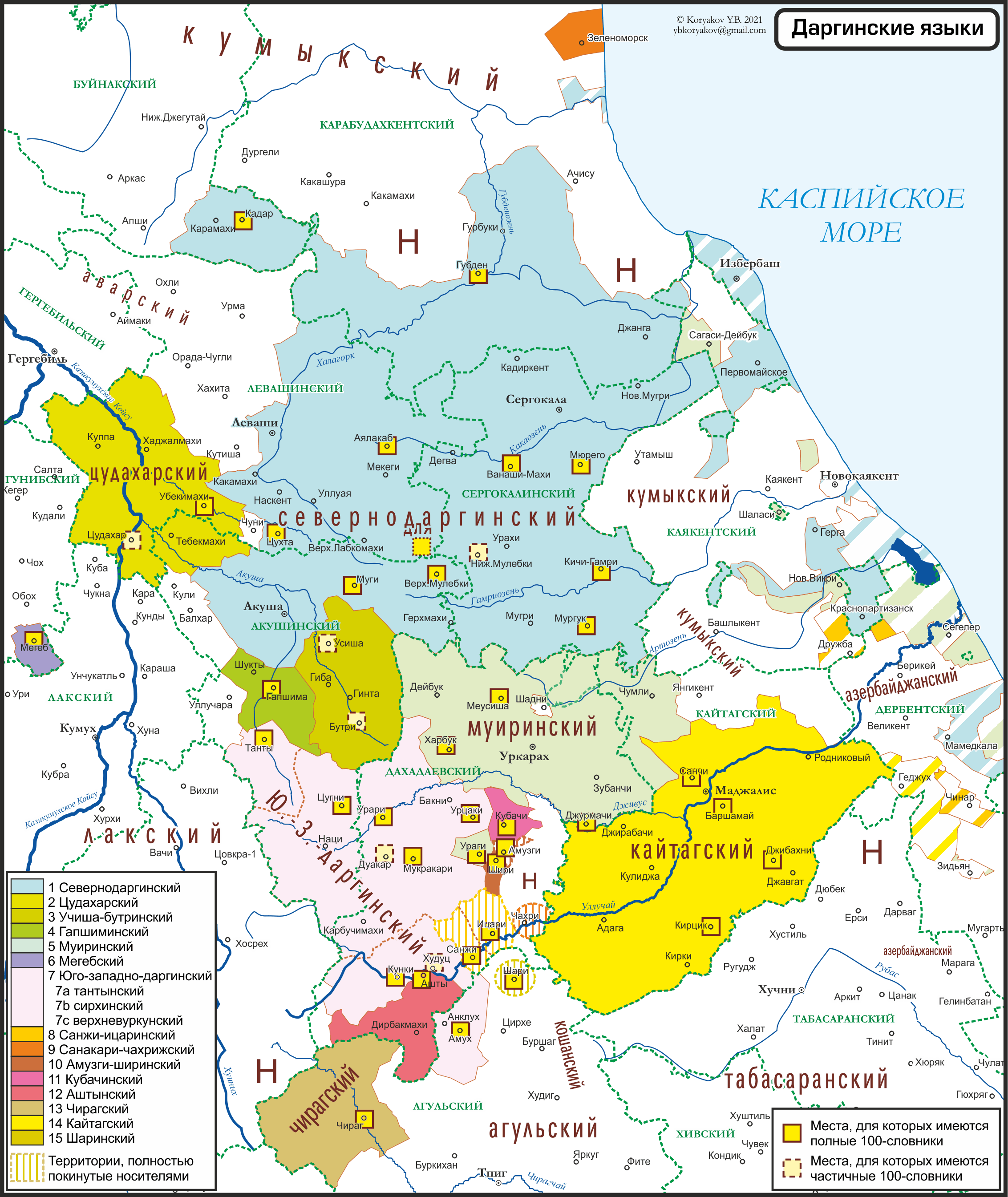
- North Dargwa

North Dargwa is a Dargin language, sometimes referred to as a language family, spoken by over 133,000 people in south-central Dagestan. The standard written variety of the language is based on the Aqusha and Urakhi dialects of it, and is not mutually intelligible with other varieties. For further information, see Dargwa language.

== Classification ==
The North Dargwa language is the largest member of the north-central group of the Dargin languages, both by number and by area. It is approximately as distant from the other North-Central languages as the others, except for Mehweb, which is divergent.

== Geographical distribution ==
North Dargwa is found in eastern Levashinsky District, central and northeastern Akushinsky District, throughout Sergokalinsky District, southern Karabudakhkentsky District, southeastern Buynaksky District, and in certain areas of Kayakentsky District. Many speakers have moved to the southern parts of European Russia.

== Dialects ==
The dialects of North Dargwa are Aqusha, Urakhi, Upper Mulebki, Murego-Gubden, Mugi, and Kadar. Out of these, Urakhi is the largest of the dialects. They are so divergent that some linguists, such as Yuri Koryakov, consider them to be on the boundary between dialects and separate languages altogether.

== Orthography ==
The following orthography is that of the literary variety based on Aqusha and Urakhi.

А а	Б б	В в	Г г	Гъ гъ	Гь гь	ГӀ гӀ	Д д	Е е	Ё ё
Ж ж	З з	И и	Й й	К к	Къ къ	Кь кь	КӀ кӀ	Л л	М м
Н н	О о	П п	ПӀ пӀ	Р р	С с	Т т	ТӀ тӀ	У у	Ф ф
Х х	Хъ хъ	Хь хь	ХӀ хӀ	Ц ц	ЦӀ цӀ	Ч ч	ЧӀ чӀ	Ш ш	Щ щ
Ъ ъ	Ы ы	Ь ь	Э э	Ю ю	Я я
