= Verkhniye Mulebki =

Verkhniye Mulebki Верхние Мулебки ЧебяхI Мулебкӏи
- Selo
- Location within Republic of Dagestan Location within Russia
- Coordinates: 42°18′N 47°31′E
- Country: Russia
- Region: Republic of Dagestan
- District: Akushinsky District
- Time zone: UTC+3:00

Verkhniye Mulebki (Russian: Верхние Мулебки; Dargwa: ЧебяхI Мулебкӏи) is a rural locality (a selo) in Akushinsky District, Republic of Dagestan, Russia. The population was 1,451 as of 2012. There are 8 streets. They speak the Upper Mulebki (kebäX-mulebkila) dialect of Qaba Dargwa (Gabha-dargwa).

== Geography ==
khniye Mulebki Dargwa village (Akusha district).

Verkhniye Mulebki is located 23 km northeast of Akusha (the district's administrative centre) by road. Nizhneye Mulebki is the nearest rural locality.
