= Urakhi dialect =

Dialect of North Dargwa

Urakhi
- Qaba, Khyurkili
- хӀурхъила лугъат къаьба
- Pronunciation: [ħuˁrqila luʁat] [ɢæβa]
- Native to: Russia
- Region: Dagestan
- Ethnicity: Urakhi Dargins
- Native speakers: 35,000 in traditional areas (2002)
- Language family: Northeast Caucasian: Dargin; North-Central; North Dargwa; Urakhi
- Standard forms: Literary Dargwa
- Writing system: Cyrillic (Uslar)

Language codes
- ISO 639-3: –
- Glottolog: urax1238
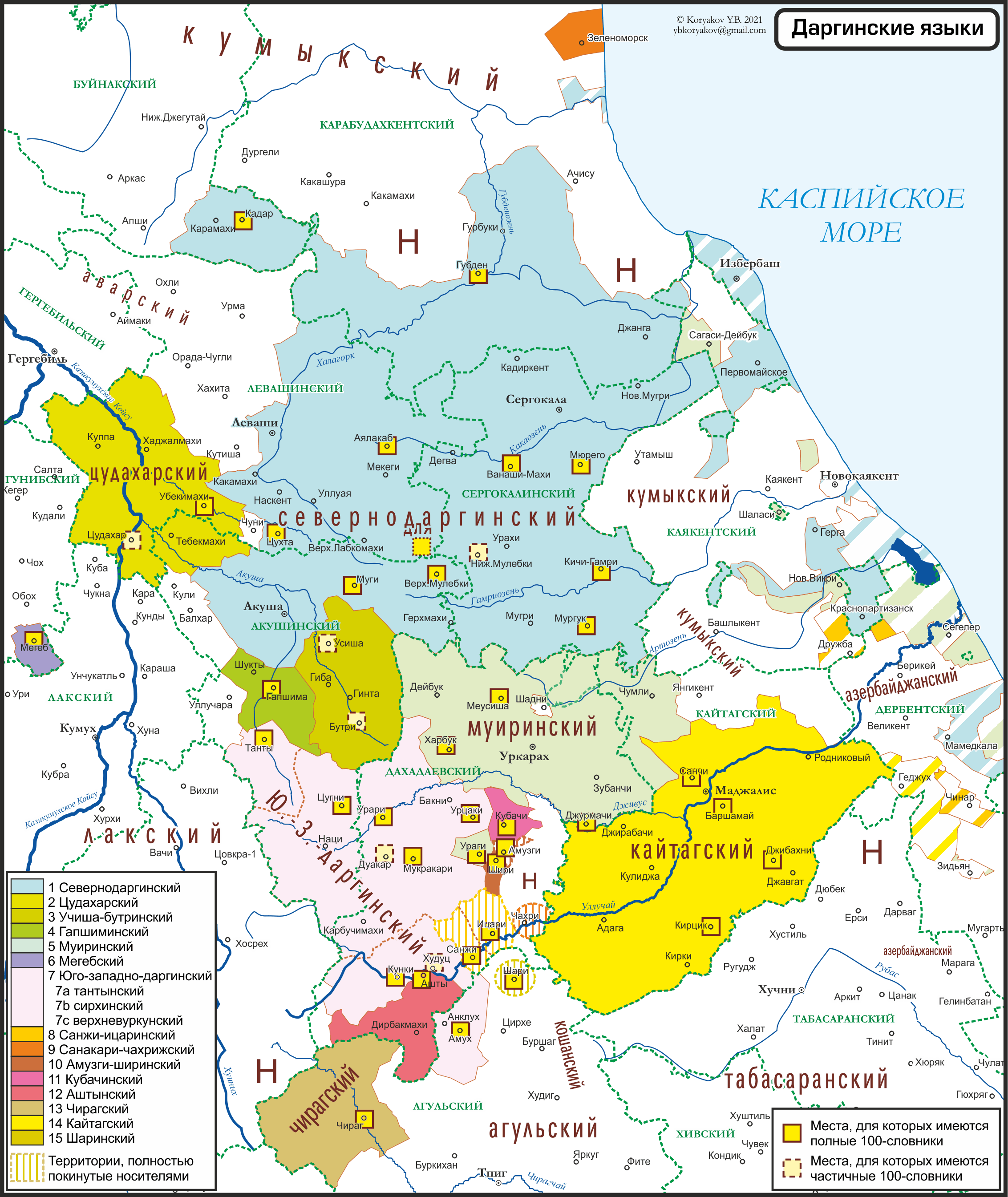
- North Dargwa, with Urakhi at the lower right of the section

Urakhi (also Khyurkili) is a dialect of North Dargwa spoken by around 35,000 people in Sergokalinsky District, the northern portions of Akushinsky District and in the villages of Gerga and Krasnopartizansk in Kayakentsky District. Along with the Aqusha dialect, it formed the basis for the literary Dargwa language.

== Phonology ==
Urakhi does not have vowel length or consonant gemination, in contrast with other varieties. The affricates [d͡ʒ] and [d͡z] are also preserved, in contrast with Tsudaqar and related varieties. The system of phonemic fortis and lenis has been lost, in accordance with the related Aqusha dialect, replaced by the corresponding voiced consonants.

== Orthography ==
Urakhi was one of the bases for the literary Dargwa language, along with Aqusha. Peter von Uslar created an orthography for Urakhi in 1892 in his grammar.

а	ӕ	в	ԝ	г	ӷ	гᷱ	д
е	ж	ђ	з	ӡ	һ
і	ј	к	қ		кᷱ	л	м
н	о	п	ԥ	ԛ		р	с
т	ҭ	у	х	ц		ч
ш
