= Kadar dialect =

Dargin dialect

Kadar
- Гъадаран лугъат G'adaran lug'at
- Pronunciation: [ʁadaran]
- Native to: Russia
- Region: Dagestan
- Ethnicity: 18,000 Kadar Dargins (2019–2024)
- Native speakers: 18,000 (2019–2024); 9,000 (2006)
- Language family: Northeast Caucasian: Dargin; North-Central; North Dargwa; Kadar
- Dialects: Kadar; Karamakhi; Chankurbe

Language codes
- ISO 639-3: –
- Glottolog: kada1294 Kadarskij
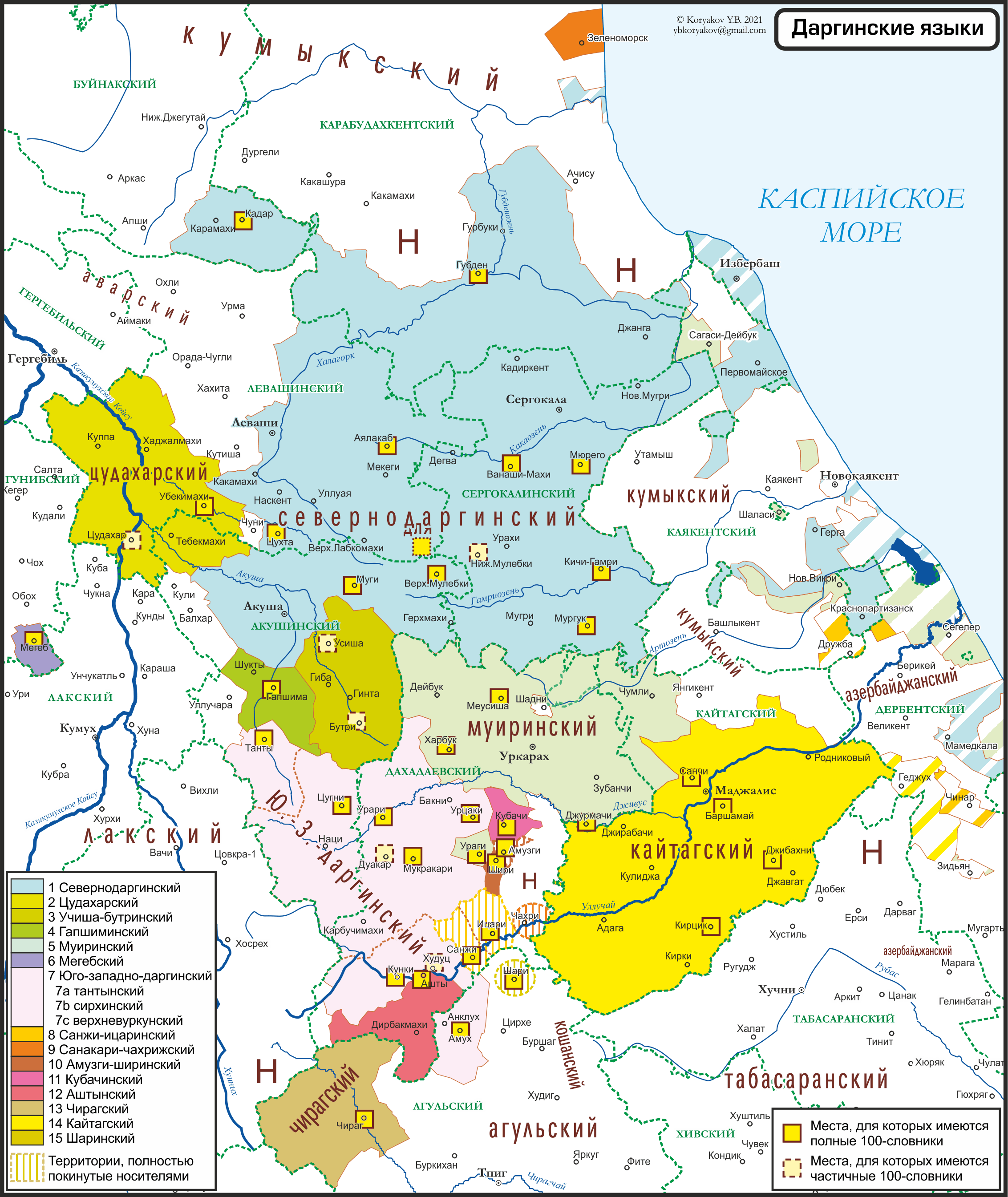
- North Dargwa, with Kadar at the top left of the map

The Kadar dialect (G'adaran lug'at / Гъадаран лугъат) is a dialect of the North Dargwa language, one of the Dargin languages, which is characterized by specific phonetic, morphological, lexical and syntactic features. It is traditionally regarded as a single dialect of Dargwa. The vocabulary layer of the Kadar dialect includes words borrowed from Arabic, Persian, Russian and especially Turkic, due to contact with Kumyk.

== Phonology ==
Kadar has 39 consonants and 5 vowels. Gemination does not occur, as in other Dargin languages, but there are labialized consonants, being [gʷ] and [kʷ].

		Labial	Dental		Postalveolar	Palatal	Velar	Uvular	Pharyngeal/ Epiglottal	Glottal
		Labial	plain	sib.	Postalveolar	Palatal	Velar	Uvular	Pharyngeal/ Epiglottal	Glottal
Nasal		m	n							
Plosive/ Affricate	voiced	b	d		d͡ʒ		ɡ	ɢ	ʡ	
Plosive/ Affricate	voiceless	p	t	t͡s	t͡ʃ		k	q		ʔ
Plosive/ Affricate	ejective	pʼ	tʼ	t͡sʼ	t͡ʃʼ		kʼ	qʼ		
Fricative	voiced	v	z		ʒ	(ʝ)		ʁ		
Fricative	voiceless	f	s		ʃ	ç		χ	ħ	h
Sonorant			l		r	j				

== Morphology ==
=== Case ===
Kadar has fewer cases than other Dargin languages.
