= Aqusha dialect =

Dargin dialect

Aqusha
- Akusha
- ахъушан / ахъушала лугъат aqušan / aqušala luʁat
- Pronunciation: [aquʃan/aquʃala luʁat]
- Native to: Russia
- Region: Dagestan
- Ethnicity: Aqusha Dargins
- Native speakers: 42,000 in traditional areas (2006)
- Language family: Northeast Caucasian: Dargin; North-Central; North Dargwa; Aqusha
- Standard forms: Literary Dargwa
- Dialects: Aqusha proper; Levashi
- Writing system: Cyrillic (Literary Dargwa only)

Language codes
- ISO 639-2: dar (Literary Dargwa only)
- ISO 639-3: dar (Literary Dargwa only)
- Glottolog: akus1238 Akusha
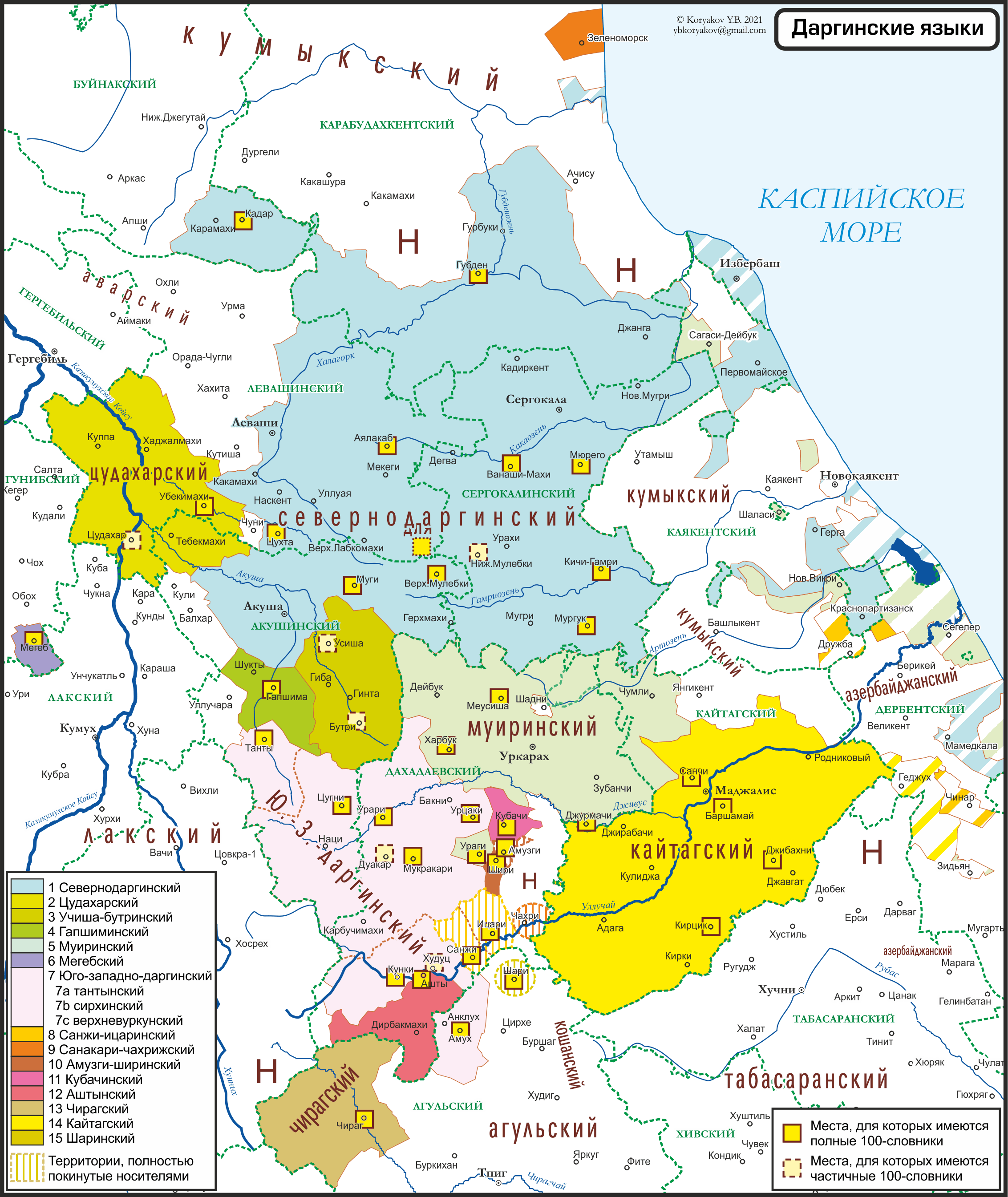
- North Dargwa, with Aqusha at the bottom left of the section

Aqusha is a dialect of North Dargwa spoken by over 42,000 Dargins. It is the basis for the literary Dargwa language, along with Urakhi, as was developed in the 1930s. Speakers of Aqusha number the most among Dargwa linguistic groups.

== Geographical distribution ==
Aqusha is most commonly found in the Akushinsky and Levashinsky Districts. There is a significant diaspora of Aqusha speakers in southern European Russia.

== Dialects ==
Aqusha is divided into 2 dialects, Aqusha and Levashi. According to Saygid Abdullayev, the differences in the Aqusha dialect are hardly noticeable and insignificant.

== Phonology ==
Aqusha, and dialects of its type, lack the fortis and lenis contrast that is found in dialects of the Tsudaqar type. Vowel length and labialization are also absent. Glottalized ⟨и⟩ and ⟨о⟩ occur, and the case indicator ⟨д⟩ is lost after prefixes.

== Comparison with standard Dargwa ==
	Aqusha	Standard	Gloss
Ergative	ший	шинни	water
Ergative	Степай	Степанни	Stepan
Ergative	Ивай	Иванни	Ivan
Ergative	хӀяй	хӀяй, хӀялли	position
Ergative	хӀуй	хӀуй, хӀулини	eye
Genitive	ши	шинна	water
Genitive	Степа	Степанна	Stepan
Genitive	хӀя	хӀялла	position
Genitive	ша	шалила	sides
Genitive	ГӀалла	Алила	Ali
Genitive	Дагъиста	Дагъиста, Дагъистанна	Dagestan
