= Ashty, Republic of Dagestan =

Ashty Ашты ГIяштти
- Selo
- Location within Republic of Dagestan Location within Russia
- Coordinates: 41°57′N 47°30′E
- Country: Russia
- Region: Republic of Dagestan
- District: Dakhadayevsky District
- Time zone: UTC+3:00

Ashty (Russian: Ашты; Dargwa: ГIяштти) is a rural locality (a selo) and the administrative centre of Ashtynsky Selsoviet, Dakhadayevsky District, Republic of Dagestan, Russia. The population was 393 as of 2010. There are 6 streets.

== Geography ==
Ashty is located 50 km southwest of Urkarakh (the district's administrative centre) by road. Khuduts and Kunki are the nearest rural localities.
