= Shari, Dakhadayevsky District, Republic of Dagestan =

Shari Шари Шири
- Selo
- Location within Republic of Dagestan Location within Russia
- Coordinates: 42°03′N 47°35′E
- Country: Russia
- Region: Republic of Dagestan
- District: Dakhadayevsky District
- Time zone: UTC+3:00

Shari (Russian: Шари; Dargwa: Шири) is a rural locality (a selo) in Uraginsky Selsoviet, Dakhadayevsky District, Republic of Dagestan, Russia. The population was 80 as of 2010. There are 2 streets.

== Geography ==
It is located 12 km southwest of Urkarakh.

== Nationalities ==
Dargins live there, speaking a particular Shari dialect or Dargin language.
