= Chirag language =

Northeast Caucasian language or dialect in Dagestan, Russia

Chirag
- хьаргънилла, xarʁnilla kub хьугъул мец, ĥuġul
- Pronunciation: [xarʁnilla kub] [xuʁul]
- Native to: North Caucasus
- Region: Agulsky District, Dagestan
- Ethnicity: 2,300 Chirag Dargins (2019–2024)
- Native speakers: 2,000 (2021)
- Language family: Northeast Caucasian: Dargin; Chirag

Language codes
- ISO 639-3: –
- Glottolog: chir1284
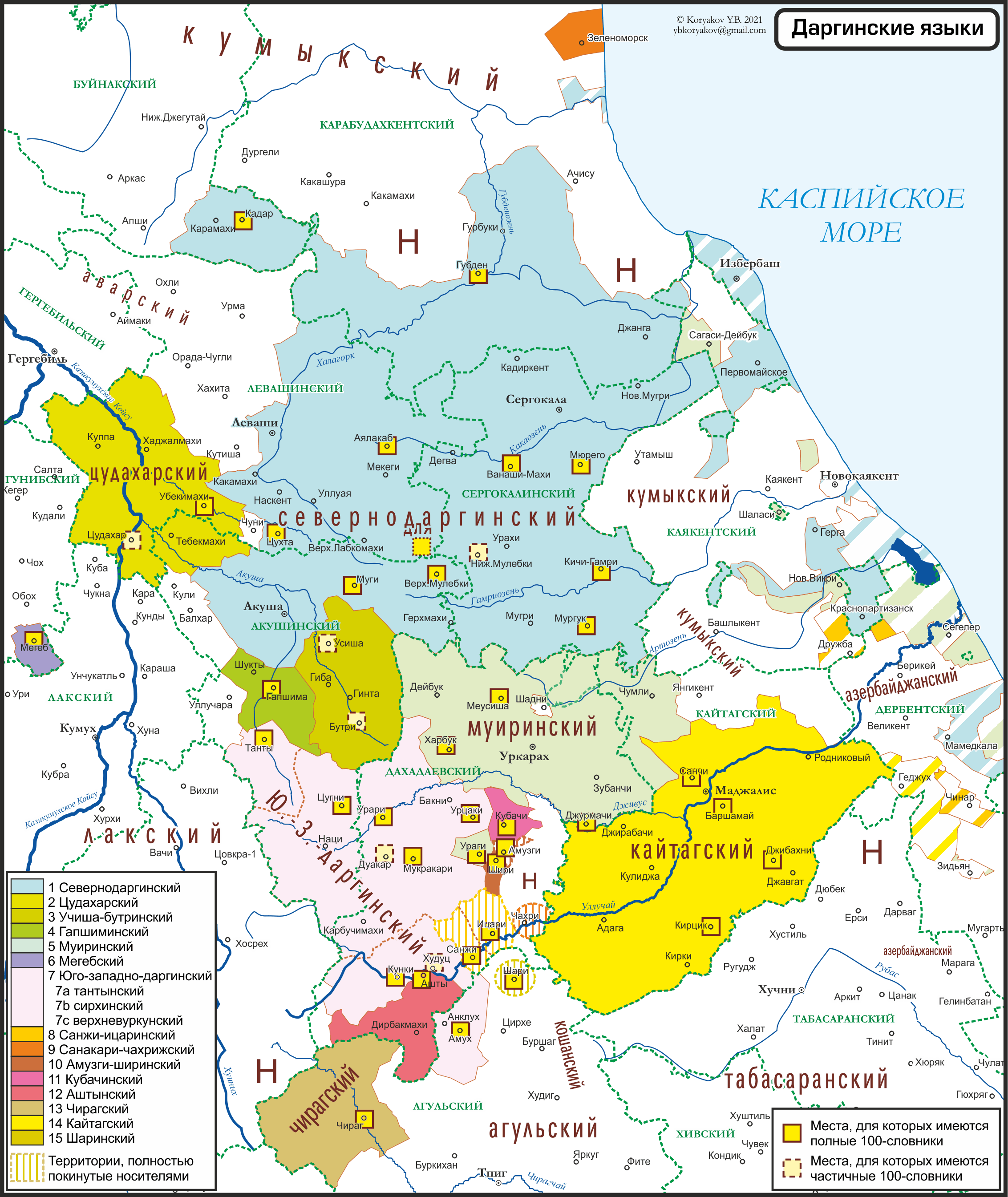
- Chirag

Chirag (Chirag: хьаргънилла, xarʁnilla kub) is a language in the Dargin dialect continuum spoken in Dagestan, Russia. It is spoken around the village of Chirag, but some speakers have moved to Kaspiysk. Chirag is often considered a divergent dialect of Dargwa, despite not being mutually intelligible with literary Dargwa. Ethnologue lists it under the dialects of Dargwa but recognizes that it may be a separate language.

== Classification ==
Based on lexical similarity, Chirag is usually classified as a separate language from other varieties of Dargwa. It has 67% lexical similarity with the North-Central group, 77.6% with the South group, and 69% with Kaitag; within the South group, it has 84% lexical similarity with Qunqi Amuq. It was apparently the first language to diverge from Proto-Dargwa.

== Phonology ==
=== Vowels ===
Chirag has four vowels: /i/, /e/, /u/, and /a/, along with two "epiglottalized" vowels, /iˁ/ and /aˁ/. Vowel length also exists for most vowels.

=== Prosody ===
In Chirag, stressed syllables are specified for tone.

=== Morphophonology ===
Chirag has some phonological processes that pertain to specific morphological elements. The plural suffix -e attracts stress and induces vowel deletion on the final syllable of disyllabic nouns (e.g., qisqan 'spider', qisqne 'spiders'). Verbal prefixes have optional front/back vowel harmony.

=== Phonotactics ===
The permitted syllable structures are CV, CVC, and CVRT.

== Grammar ==
Chirag is head-final, has fairly flexible word order and is rich with inflectional morphology. It has ergative–absolutive alignment in its case marking; the subject of a transitive verb is overtly marked with ergative case, and the subject of an intransitive verb and the object of a transitive verb are unmarked:

ʡale šːa w-ačʼ-ib.
Ali(ABS) home.LOC M.SG-come:PFV-AOR.3
Ali came home.

ʡali-le qa̰r-be d-iʡ-un.
Ali-ERG apple-PL(ABS) N.PL-steal:PFV-AOR.3
Ali stole apples.

There are three noun classes, being male, female, and neuter. In the plural form, however, the male and female classes are identical, thus leading to a two-way human-nonhuman opposition.

== Lexicon ==
Due to the proximity of Chirag to Aghul, Lak, and Lezgin, it has some loanwords from these languages, such as марххале ("snow", derived from Lak марххале).

== Usage ==
There are efforts to enable automated translation of text from English to Chirag.
