= Tsudaqar language =

Dargin language

Tsudaqar
- Tsudakhar, Cudaxar, Chudakhar
- цӀудхърила мец c’udqrila mec цӀудхъуран мец c’udquran mec
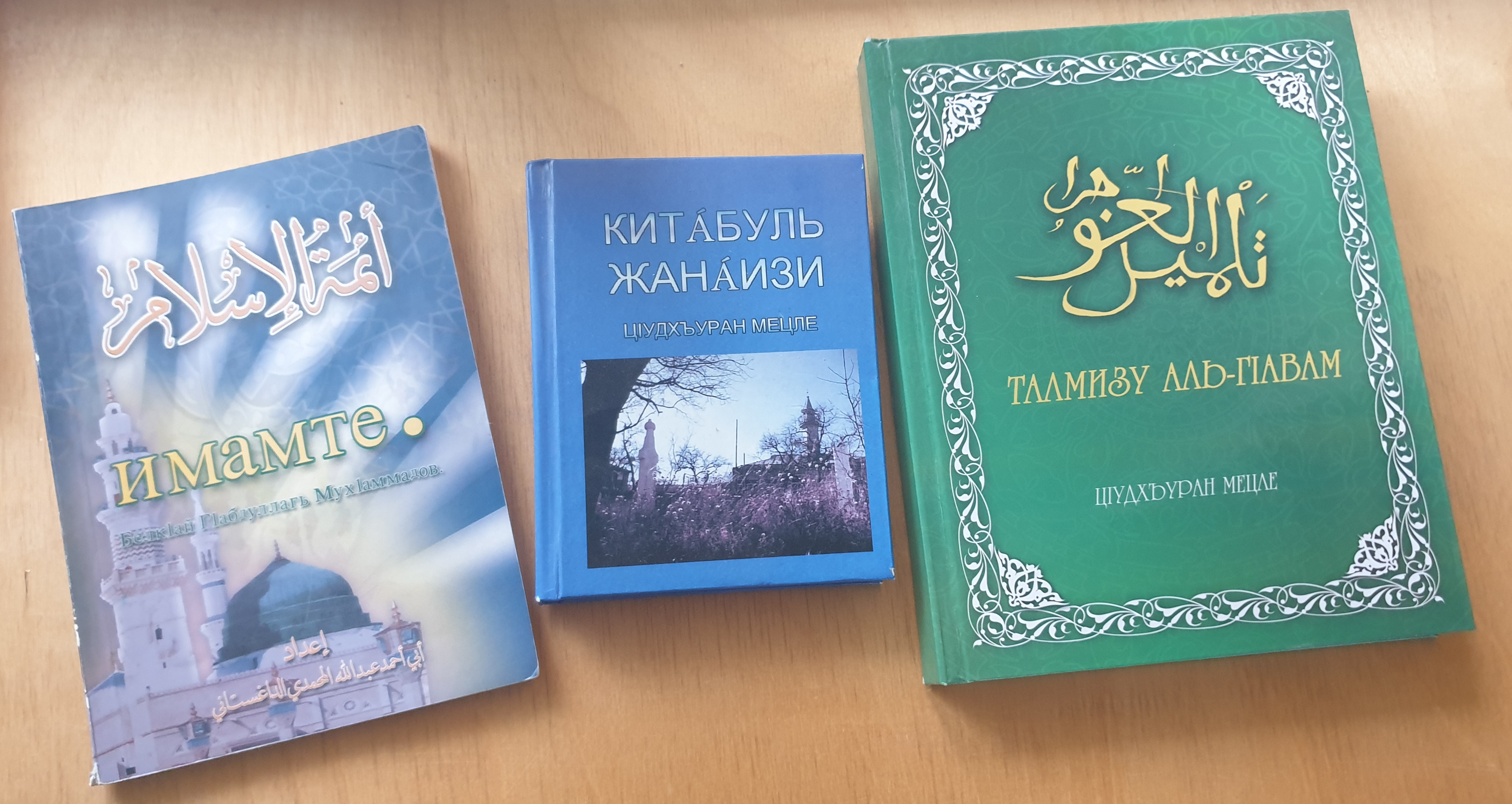
- Books in Tsudaqar
- Pronunciation: [ts’udqrila mets] [ts’udqran mets]
- Native to: Russia
- Region: Dagestan
- Ethnicity: Tsudaqar people
- Native speakers: 33,000 in traditional areas (2010)
- Language family: Northeast Caucasian: Dargin; North-Central; Tsudaqar
- Dialects: Tsudaqar proper (East); Kuppa-Karekadani (West)
- Writing system: Cyrillic

Language codes
- ISO 639-3: –
- Glottolog: cuda1238 Cudaxar
- Linguasphere: 42-BBB-bac
- IETF: dar-x-HIS09130
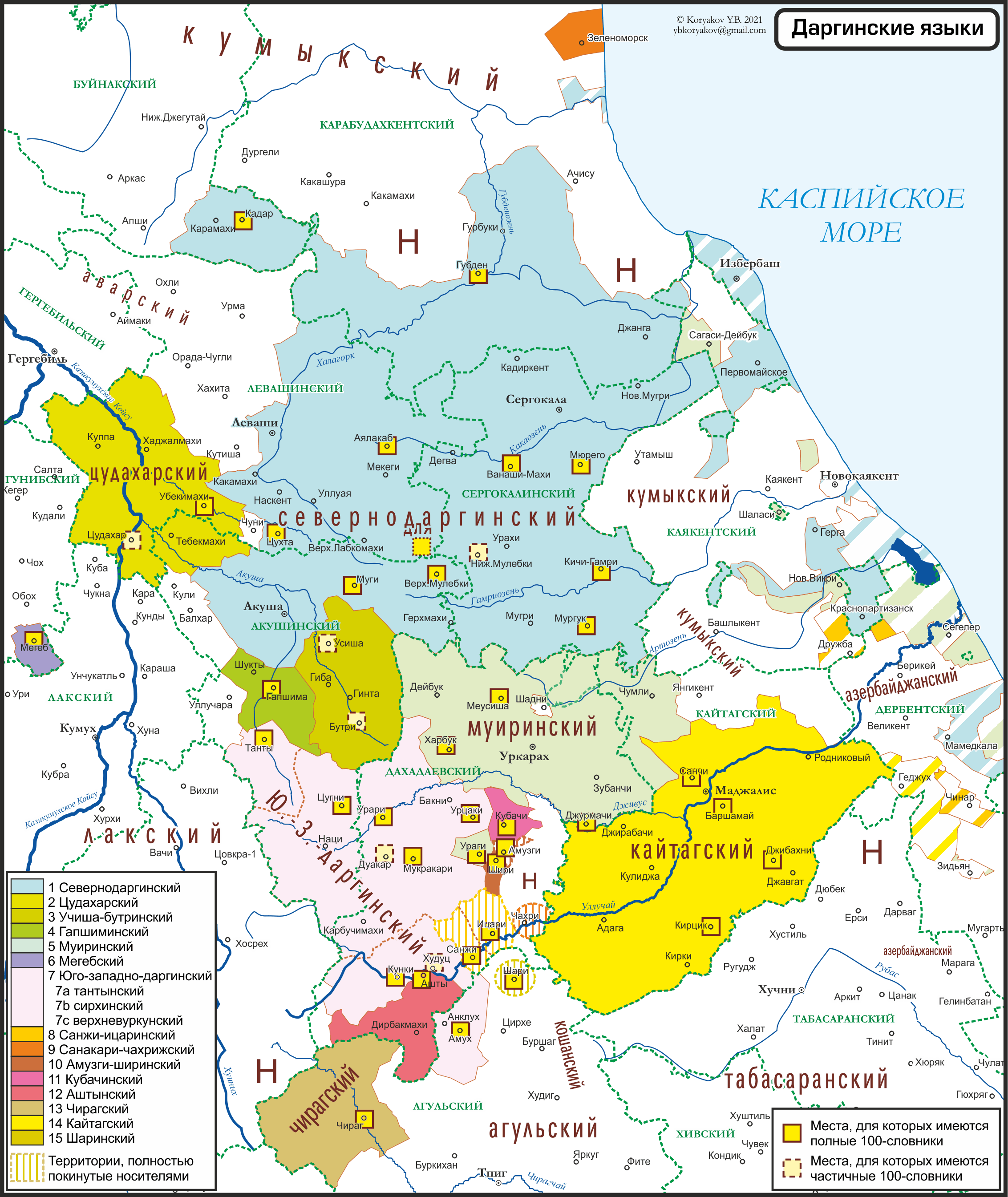
- Tsudaqar

Tsudaqar (also Tsudakhar, Cudaxar) is a Dargin language, quite different from the literary variety, spoken by over 33,000 people in the Levashinsky and Akushinsky Districts, Novy Kostek in Khasavyurtovsky District, and Novokare in Babayurtovsky District, Dagestan. The village of Tsudakhar was the traditional center. It is considered to be threatened with extinction, being transmitted to children, but not by all families. In modern times, work is underway to revitalize Tsudaqar and create an alphabet for the language.

== Revival ==
In response to the declining health and use of the language, speakers have revived the usage of the language, as well as studying and preserving it. An orthography for the language was also devised. Lessons for learning Tsudaqar are available online, and there is a YouTube channel Цудахарское общество which promotes Tsudaqar culture, history and life.

== Phonology ==
Tsudaqar has lost the affricates [d͡ʒ] and [d͡z]. The system of phonemic fortis and lenis has been retained, similar to the system used in Avar–Andic and Lak.

== Orthography ==
А а

/ɑ/

Б б

/b/

В в

/w/

Г г

/g/

Гъ гъ

/ʁ/

Гь гь

/h/

ГӀ гӀ

/ʡ/

ГӀӀ гӀӀ

/ʡʼ/

Д д

/d/

Е е

/e/; /je/

Ё ё

/eˤ/

Ж ж

/ʒ/

З з

/z/

И и

/i/

Й й

/j/

К к

/k/

Кк кк

/kː/

Къ къ

/qː/

Кь кь

/qʼ/

КӀ кӀ

/kʼ/

Л л

/l/

М м

/m/

Н н

/n/

О о

/о/

П п

/p/

Пп пп

/pː/

ПӀ пӀ

/pʼ/

Р р

/r/

С с

/s/

Сс сс

/sː/

Т т

/t/

Тт тт

/tː/

ТӀ тӀ

/tʼ/

У у

/u/

Ф ф

/f/

Х х

/χ/

Хх хх

/χː/

Хъ хъ

/q/

Хь хь

/x/

Хьхь хьхь

/xː/

ХӀ хӀ

/ħ/

Ц ц

/t͡s/

Цц цц

/t͡sː/

ЦӀ цӀ

/t͡sʼ/

Ч ч

/t͡ʃ/

Чч чч

/t͡ʃː/

ЧӀ чӀ

/t͡ʃʼ/

Ш ш

/ʃ/

Ъ ъ

/ʔ/

Э э

/e/; /ʔe/

Ю ю

/ju/

Ӱ ӱ

/uˤ/

Я я

/ja/

Щ щ

/ʃː/

The letters о, ф, ы, ё, ь are only found in loanwords.

ӱ never occurs word-initially and is only found after a consonant.
