= Kubachi language =

Northeast Caucasian language or dialect in Dagestan, Russia

Kubachi
- Ughbug, Kubachin, Kubachintsy, Qubachi
- гӀюгъбугъан куб/гъай
- Pronunciation: [ʡūˁʁbugan kub/ʁaj]
- Native to: North Caucasus
- Region: Dagestan
- Ethnicity: Kubachins
- Native speakers: 7,000 (2020)
- Language family: Northeast Caucasian: Dargin; Southern; Ashti-Kubachi; Kubachi
- Writing system: Cyrillic script

Language codes
- ISO 639-3: ugh
- Glottolog: kuba1248
- Linguasphere: 42-BBB-baf
- 42-BBB-bag
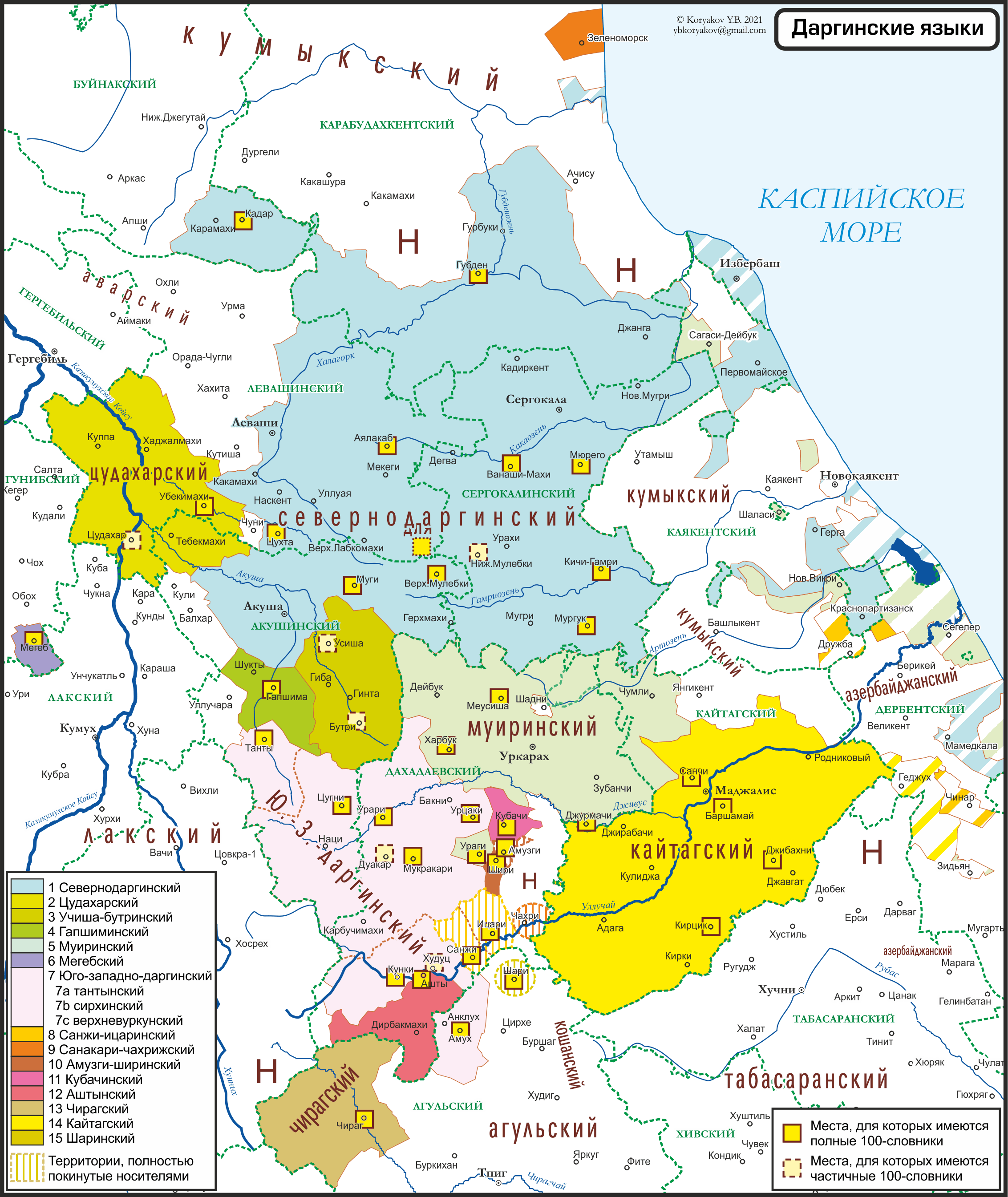
- Kubachi

Kubachi (alternatively Kubachin) is a language in the Dargin dialect continuum spoken in Dagestan, Russia, by Kubachi people. It is often considered a divergent dialect of Dargwa, but it has also historically been portrayed as a separate language. Ethnologue lists it as a separate language.

== Phonology ==
=== Vowels ===
Vowel phonemes of Kubachi
	Front			Back	
		plain	phar.	plain	phar.
close	short			[u] у u	[uˤ] уӀ ü
close	long			[uː] уу uu	[uˤː] ууӀ üü
near-close	short	[ɪ] и i	[ɪˤ] иӀ ï		
near-close	long	[ɪː] ии ii	[ɪˤː] ииӀ ïï		
open-mid	short	[ɛ] е e	[ɛˤ] еӀ ë		
open-mid	long	[ɛː] ee ee	[ɛˤː] eeӀ ëë		
open	short			[ɑ] а a	[ɑˤ] аӀ ä
open	long			[ɑː] aa aa	[ɑˤː] aaӀ ää

=== Consonants ===
The glottal stop transcribed here is named rather ambiguously a "glottalic laryngeal" by both sources.

Consonant phonemes of Kubachi
		Bilabial	Dental	Alveolar	Palatal	Velar		Uvular		Pharyngeal	Glottal
		Bilabial	Dental	Alveolar	Palatal	plain	labialized	plain	labialized	Pharyngeal	Glottal
Nasal		[m] м m	[n] н n								
Plosive	voiced	[b] б b	[d] д d			[g] г g	[gʷ] гв gw			[ʡ] гӀ ÿ	[ʔ] ъ y
Plosive	aspirated	[pʰ] п p	[tʰ] т t			[kʰ] к k	[kʷʰ] кв kw	[qʰ] къ q	[qʷʰ] къв qw	[ʡ] гӀ ÿ	[ʔ] ъ y
Plosive	fortis	[pː] пп pp	[tː] тт tt			[kː] кк kk	[kʷː] ккв kkw	[qː] ккъ qq	[qʷː] ккъв qqw	[ʡ] гӀ ÿ	[ʔ] ъ y
Plosive	ejective	[pʼ] пӀ pʼ	[tʼ] тӀ tʼ			[kʼ] кӀ kʼ	[kʷʼ] кӀв kʼw	[qʼ] кь qʼ	[qʷʼ] кьв qʼw	[ʡ] гӀ ÿ	[ʔ] ъ y
Affricate	aspirated		[t͡sʰ] ц c	[t͡ʃʰ] ч ç				[q͡χʰ] хъ qx	[q͡χʷʰ] хъв qxw		
Affricate	fortis		[t͡sː] цц cc	[t͡ʃː] чч çç							
Affricate	ejective		[t͡sʼ] цӀ cʼ	[t͡ʃʼ] чӀ çʼ							
Fricative	voiced		[z] з z	[ʒ] ж ẑ				[ʁ] гъ ĝ	[ʁʷ] гъв ĝw	[ħ] хӀ ħ	[h] гь h
Fricative	plain		[s] с s	[ʃ] ш ş		[x] хь ĵ	[xʷ] хьв ĵw	[χ] х x	[χʷ] хв xw	[ħ] хӀ ħ	[h] гь h
Fricative	fortis		[sː] сс ss	[ʃː] шш şş		[xː] ххь ĵĵ	[xʷː] ххьв ĵĵw	[χː] хх xx	[χʷː] ххв xxw	[ħ] хӀ ħ	[h] гь h
Trill				[r] р r							
Approximant		[w] в v	[l] л l		[j] й j						

The original Dargwic phoneme [r] in Kubachi has become [j] or disappeared, lengthening the neighboring vowel.

== Alphabet ==
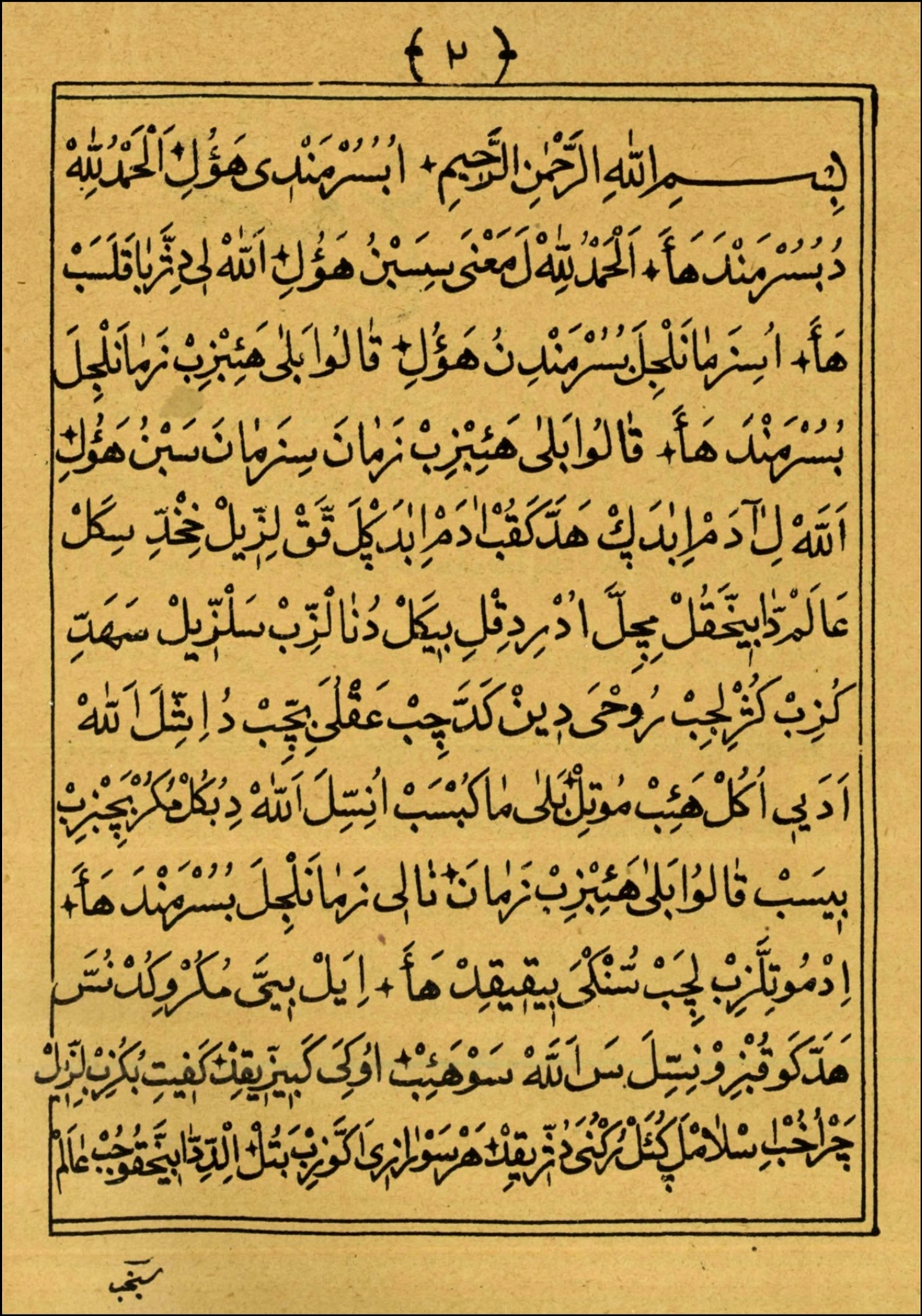
A page from the book "МаджмугI", the only Kubachi-language book to be published before the Russian Revolution, written in the Arabic script, published in 1913.

А а

/ɑ/

Б б

/b/

В в

/w/

Г г

/g/

Гъ гъ

/ʁ/

Гь гь

/ɦ/

Д д

/d/

Е е

/e/;/je/

Ё ё

/jɔ/

Ж ж

/ʒ/

З з

/z/

И и

/i/

Й й

/j/

К к

/k/

Кк кк

/kː/

Къ къ

/qʰ/

Кь кь

/qʼ/

КӀ кӀ

/kʼ/

Л л

/l/

М м

/m/

Н н

/n/

О о

/n/

П п

/pʰ/

Пп пп

/pː/

ПӀ пӀ

/pʼ/

Р р

/r/

С с

/s/

Сс сс

/sː/

Т т

/t/

Тт тт

/tː/

ТӀ тӀ

/tʼ/

У у

/u/

Ф ф

/f/

Х х

/χ/

Хх хх

/χː/

Хъ хъ

/qʰ/

Хь хь

/x/

Хьхь хьхь

/xː/

ХӀ хӀ

/ʜ/;/ħ/

Ц ц

/ts/

Цц цц

/tsː/

ЦӀ цӀ

/tsʼ/

Ч ч

/tʃ/

Чч чч

/tʃː/

ЧӀ чӀ

/tʃʼ/

Ш ш

/ʃ/

Шш шш

/ʃː/

Ъ ъ

/ʔ/

Э э

/e/

Ю ю

/ju/

Я я

/ja/, /jə/
