= Khuduts =

Khuduts Худуц ХудуцI
- Selo
- Location within Republic of Dagestan Location within Russia
- Coordinates: 41°57′N 47°30′E
- Country: Russia
- Region: Republic of Dagestan
- District: Dakhadayevsky District
- Time zone: UTC+3:00

Khuduts (Russian: Худуц; Dargwa: ХудуцI) is a rural locality (a selo) in Ashtynsky Selsoviet, Dakhadayevsky District, Republic of Dagestan, Russia. The population was 425 as of 2010. There are 3 streets.

== Geography ==
Khuduts is located 47 km southwest of Urkarakh (the district's administrative centre) by road, on the Ulluchay River. Ashty and Kunki are the nearest rural localities.
