= Mehweb language =

Divergent Dargin language

Mehweb
- Megeb
- мехӀвела мез
- Pronunciation: [meħʷela mez]
- Native to: Russia
- Region: Megeb, Dagestan
- Ethnicity: Dargins
- Native speakers: 800-900 (2019); 1,300 (2021)
- Language family: Northeast Caucasian: Dargin; North-Central Dargin; Mehweb
- Writing system: unwritten

Language codes
- ISO 639-3: –
- Glottolog: mege1234
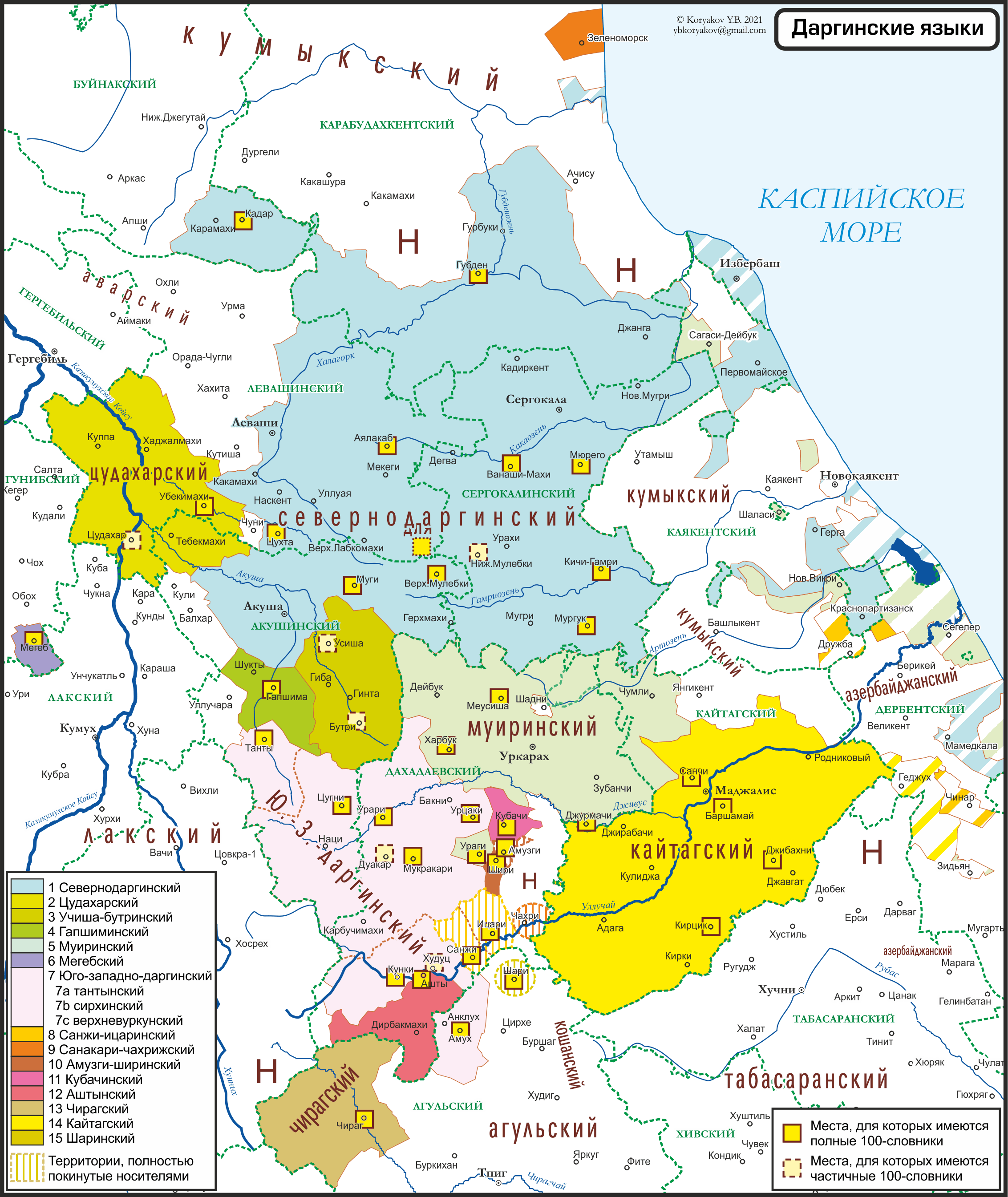
- Mehweb

Mehweb (Mehweb: мехӀвела мез, meħʷela mez) or Megeb is a Dargin language, frequently considered a dialect of a unified Dargwa language, spoken in the village of Megeb in Dagestan, as well as by former residents of the village who have moved to larger cities, by about 800 to 900 people.

== Geographical distribution ==
Mehweb is isolated from all other varieties of Dargwa and is surrounded by regions of Avar- and Lak-language speakers. All native speakers of Mehweb originate from Megeb, including those who have migrated to larger cities. Some Mehweb is spoken in the nearby Avar village of Obokh. There is no language shift occurring in the village, but multilingualism in Russian has increased over the years. The official language in the region is Avar, which Mehweb speakers are taught in school, and as a result, many speakers are bi- or trilingual.

== Classification ==
While Mehweb is a typical representative of the northern branch of Dargin, its isolation, estimated to span from 300 to 1000 years, combined with the development of a distinct identity and influence from Avar and Lak, has led many to consider it as a separate language. It is completely mutually unintelligible with other Dargin languages.

== Phonology ==
=== Consonants ===
Mehweb has 41 consonants. Gemination does not occur.

Consonants of Mehweb
		Labial	Dental	Alveolar	Palatal	Velar		Uvular		Pharyngeal		Epiglottal		Glottal	
		Labial	Dental	Alveolar	Palatal	plain	lab.	plain	lab.	plain	lab.	plain	lab.	plain	lab.
Plosive	voiced	b	d			ɡ	ɡʷ								
Plosive	voiceless	p	t			k	kʷ	q	qʷ			(ʡ)^{1}	(ʡʷ)^{1}	ʔ	ʔʷ
Plosive	ejective	pʼ	tʼ			kʼ	kʷʼ	qʼ	qʷʼ						
Fricative	voiced		z	ʒ		(ɣ)^{2}		ʁ	ʁʷ					(ɦ)^{3}	
Fricative	voiceless		s	ʃ		x	xʷ	χ	χʷ	ħ	ħʷ	(ʜ)^{1}	(ʜʷ)^{1}	h	hʷ
Affricate	voiced		(d͡z)^{4}	(d͡ʒ)^{4}											
Affricate	voiceless		t͡s	t͡ʃ											
Affricate	ejective		t͡sʼ	t͡ʃʼ											
Sonorant		m w	n l r^{5}		j										

Mehweb has a three-way opposition between voiced plosives, ejectives and voiceless plosives.

1. [ʡ] and [ʜ] are essentially pharyngealized versions of [ʔ] and [ħ].
2. [ɣ] is rare and is realised as [ɡ] by younger speakers.
3. [h] may be rarely realized as [ɦ].
4. [d͡z] and [d͡ʒ] are realizations of [z] and [ʒ] by older speakers.
5. Sonorants [n] [l] [r] can be articulated as being either dental or alveolar.

Pharyngealization is considered to be suprasegmental, as it is not associated with any specific consonant or vowel. It results in epiglottalization of the glottal phonemes and centralization of vowels.

=== Vowels ===
	Front		Back	
	plain	phar.	plain	phar.
Close	i	(iˤ)	u	(uˤ)
Mid	e	(eˤ)		oˤ
Open	a	aˤ		

Vowel length is not phonemic. Vowels [iˤ], [eˤ], and [uˤ] are very rare and their status is unclear, and the other pharyngealized vowels are uncommon.

== Writing system ==
Mehweb is an unwritten language, and speakers use Avar or Russian for writing. There is no evidence that Mehweb was written using Arabic or Cyrillic in the past, unlike Archi.
