= Chankurbe =

Village in the Republic of Dagestan, Russia

Chankurbe Чанкурбе ЧӀянкӀурбе
- Selo
- Location within Republic of Dagestan Location within Russia
- Coordinates: 42°37′N 47°17′E
- Country: Russia
- Region: Republic of Dagestan
- District: Buynaksky District
- Time zone: UTC+3:00

Chankurbe (Russian: Чанкурбе; Dargwa: ЧӀянкӀурбе) is a rural locality (a selo) and the administrative centre of Chankubinsky Selsoviet, Buynaksky District, Republic of Dagestan, Russia. The population was 1,209 as of 2010. There are nine streets.

== Geography ==
Chankurbe is located 34 km southeast of Buynaksk (the district's administrative centre) by road. Kadar and Vanashimakhi are the nearest rural localities.
