= Dargin languages =

Dialect continuum of Northeast Caucasian languages

Dargin
- Dargwa
- Geographic distribution: Southcentral Dagestan
- Native speakers: 590,000 (2020 census)
- Linguistic classification: Northeast Caucasian: Dargin
- Proto-language: Proto-Dargwa
- Subdivisions: North-Central; Kajtak-Shari; Southern; Chirag

Language codes
- ISO 639-2 / 5: dar
- ISO 639-3: dar
- Glottolog: darg1242
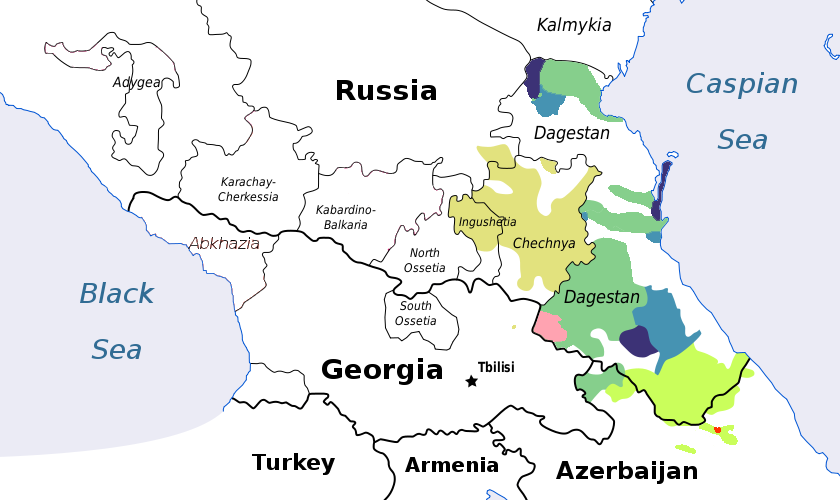
- Dargin

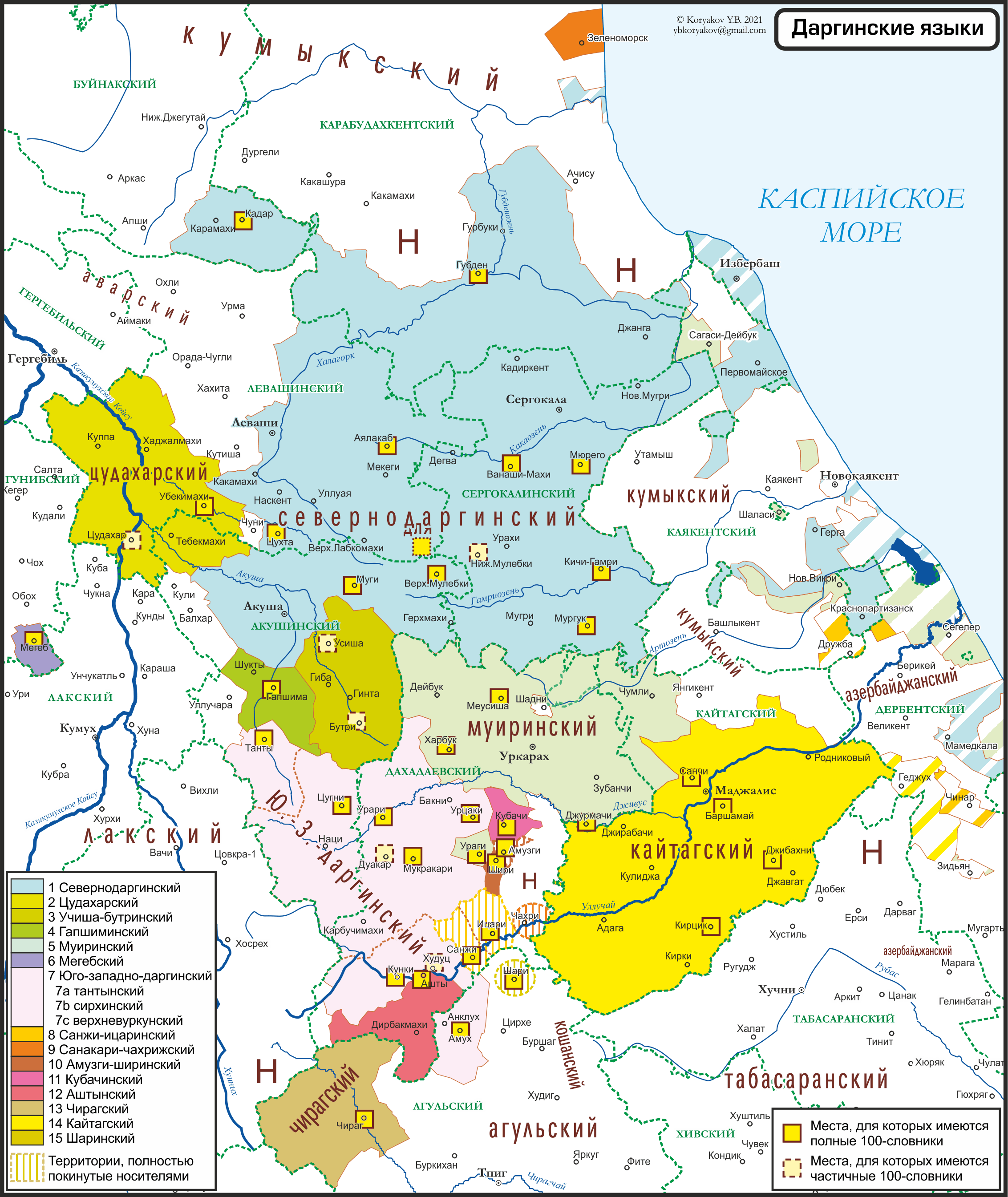
- Map of individual Dargin languages according to Koryakov 2021.

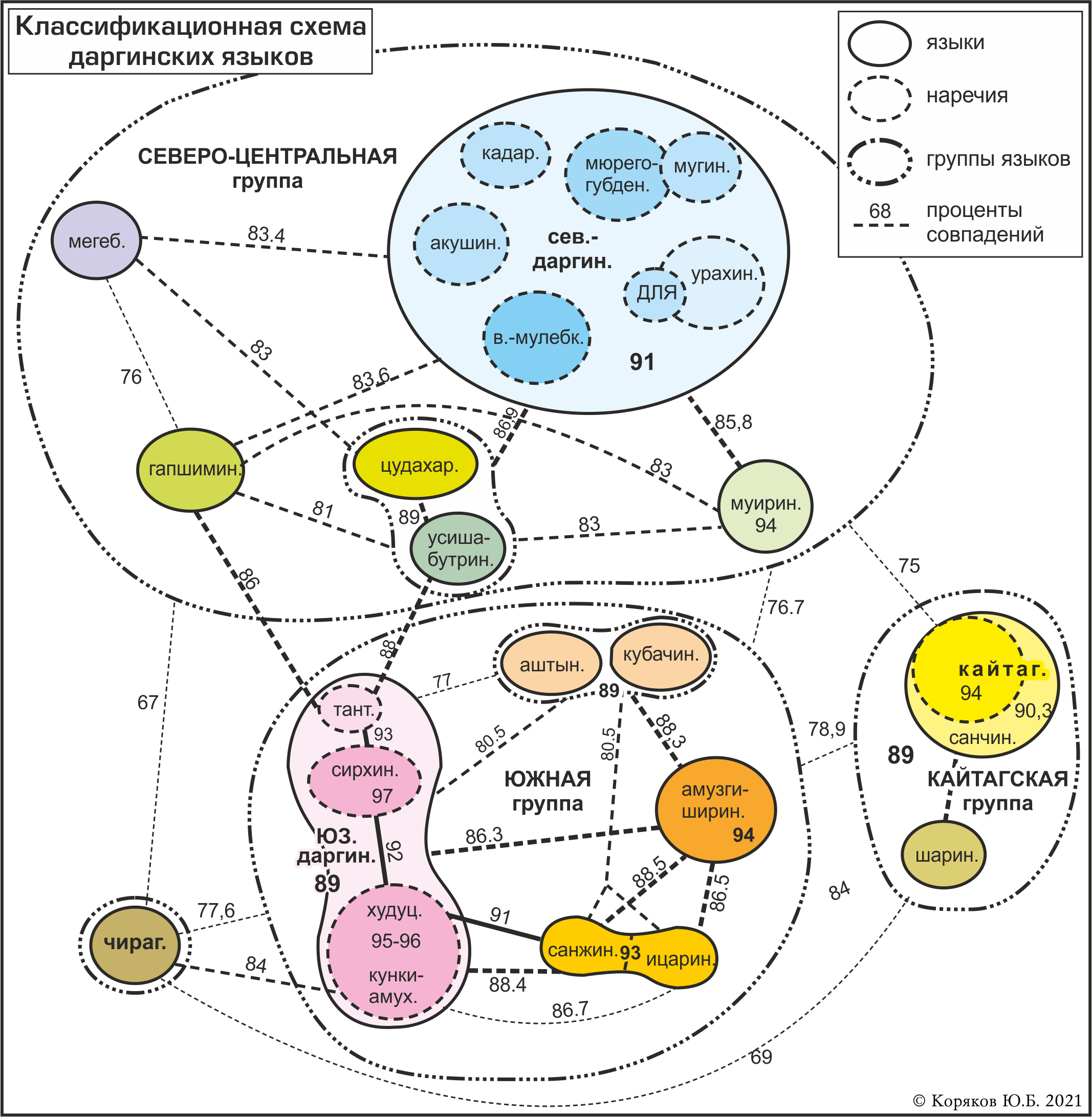
Classification of Dargin languages according to Koryakov 2021.

The Dargin languages consist of a dialect continuum of over 60 Northeast Caucasian languages or dialects spoken by the Dargin people in southcentral Dagestan. Kajtak, Kubachi, Itsari, Mehweb and Chirag are often considered dialects of the same Dargin/Dargwa language. Ethnologue lists these under a common Dargin language, but also states that these may be separate languages from Dargwa proper. Reasons for classifying the southern group of dialects from the northern group is that speakers of the southern dialects have been reported as treating the literary Aqusha dialect as a foreign language. Due to the linguistic fragmentation of the Dargin languages, speakers use Russian as a lingua franca.

== Classification ==
The Dargin languages are classified as follows by Koryakov 2021:

Dargin

  - Northern-central group
    - Mehweb
    - Gapshima
    - Muira
    - Tsudaqar-Usisha-Butri
      - Tsudaqar
      - Usisha-Butri
    - North Dargwa
      - Kadar
      - Murego-Gubden
      - Mugi
      - Upper Mulebki
      - Aqusha
        - Aqusha proper
        - Levashi
      - Urakhi
  - Southern group
    - Ashti-Kubachi
      - Ashti
      - Kubachi
    - Sanzhi-Itsari
      - Sanzhi
      - Itsari
    - Sanakari-Chakhrizhi (unclassified)
    - Amuzgi-Shiri
      - Amuzgi
      - Shiri
    - Southwestern Dargwa
      - Tanti
      - Sirhwa
      - Upper Vurquni/Amuq-Khuduts-Kunki
  - Chirag
  - Kaitag group
    - Shari
    - Kaitag

Mutalov 2021 proposes a different classification:

Dargin languages

  - North Dargwa
    - Aqusha/North Dargwa
      - Aqusha proper
      - Urakhi
      - Mekegi
      - Gubden
      - Murego
      - Kadar
      - Mugi
      - Muira
      - Gapshima
    - Mehweb
  - Southern Dargwa
    - Sirkhya-Tsudaqar
      - Tsudaqar
      - Usisha
      - Butri
      - Tanti
      - Sirhwa
      - Khuduts
      - Amuq
      - Kunki
      - Sanzhi
      - Itsari
      - Amuzgi-Shiri
      - other dialects
    - Kubachi
      - Kubachi proper
      - Ashti
    - Kaitag
      - Upper Kaitag
      - Lower Kaitag
      - Shari
      - Chakhrizhi-Sanakari
    - Chirag

Glottolog uses a different classification, based on Koryakov 2012.

Dargwic

  - Chirag
  - Kubachi
  - North-Central Dargwa
    - Megeb
    - North Dargwa
      - Cudaxar
      - Gapshin-Butrin
      - Kadarskij
      - Muirin
        - Dejbuk
        - Xarbuk
      - Nuclear North Dargwa
        - Aqusha-Uraxi
          - Akusha
          - Uraxa
        - Mugin
        - Murego-Gubden
        - Upper Mulebki
  - South Dargwa
    - Kajtak
    - Southwestern Dargwa
      - Amuzgu-Shiri
      - Sanzhi-Icari
        - Icari
        - Sanzhi
      - Sirhwa-Tanty
      - Upper-Vurqri
        - Amux
        - Khuduts
        - Qunqi

== Phonology ==
The following chart is a collective phoneme inventory of all Dargin languages.

		Labial	Dental		Postalveolar	Palatal	Velar	Uvular	Pharyngeal Epiglottal	Glottal
		Labial	plain	sib.	Postalveolar	Palatal	Velar	Uvular	Pharyngeal Epiglottal	Glottal
Nasal		m	n							
Plosive/ Affricate	voiced	b	d	d͡z^{1}	d͡ʒ^{1}		ɡ	ɢ^{1}	ʡ^{1}	
Plosive/ Affricate	voiceless	p	t	t͡s	t͡ʃ		k	q		ʔ
Plosive/ Affricate	long	pː^{2}	tː^{2}	t͡sː^{2}	t͡ʃː^{2}		kː^{2}	qː^{2}		
Plosive/ Affricate	ejective	pʼ	tʼ	t͡sʼ	t͡ʃʼ		kʼ	qʼ	ʡʼ^{2}	
Fricative	voiced	v^{1}	z		ʒ		ɣ^{1}	ʁ	ʢ	ɦ
Fricative	voiceless	f^{1}	s		ʃ	ç^{1}	x	χ	ʜ	
Fricative	long		sː^{2}		ʃː^{2}		xː^{2}	χː^{2}		
Trill					r					
Approximant		w	l			j				

1. Present in the literary standard of Dargwa, but not some other dialects.
2. Present in some dialects, but not the literary standard.

The source is rather ambiguous in its using the term "laryngeal" for a presumed column of consonants that includes both a "voiced" and a "glottalized" plosive. A voiced glottal plosive cannot be made, because the glottis needs to be closed, and an ejective consonant requires an additional closure further up the vocal tract. Pending clarification, this row has been transcribed here as an epiglottal column and a glottal stop, both found in many other East Caucasian languages.
