= Gerga, Republic of Dagestan =

Gerga Герга
- Selo
- Location within Republic of Dagestan Location within Russia
- Coordinates: 42°20′N 47°57′E
- Country: Russia
- Region: Republic of Dagestan
- District: Kayakentsky District
- Time zone: UTC+3:00

Gerga (Russian: Герга) is a rural locality (a selo) in Kayakentsky District, Republic of Dagestan, Russia. The population was 3,913 as of 2010. There are 49 streets.

== Geography ==
Gerga is located 8 km southwest of Novokayakent (the district's administrative centre) by road. Shalasi and Novye Vikri are the nearest rural localities.

== Nationalities ==
Dargins live there.
