= Peter von Uslar =

Russian linguist, general and engineer (1816–1875)

Pyotr Karlovich Uslar
- Пётр Карлович Услар
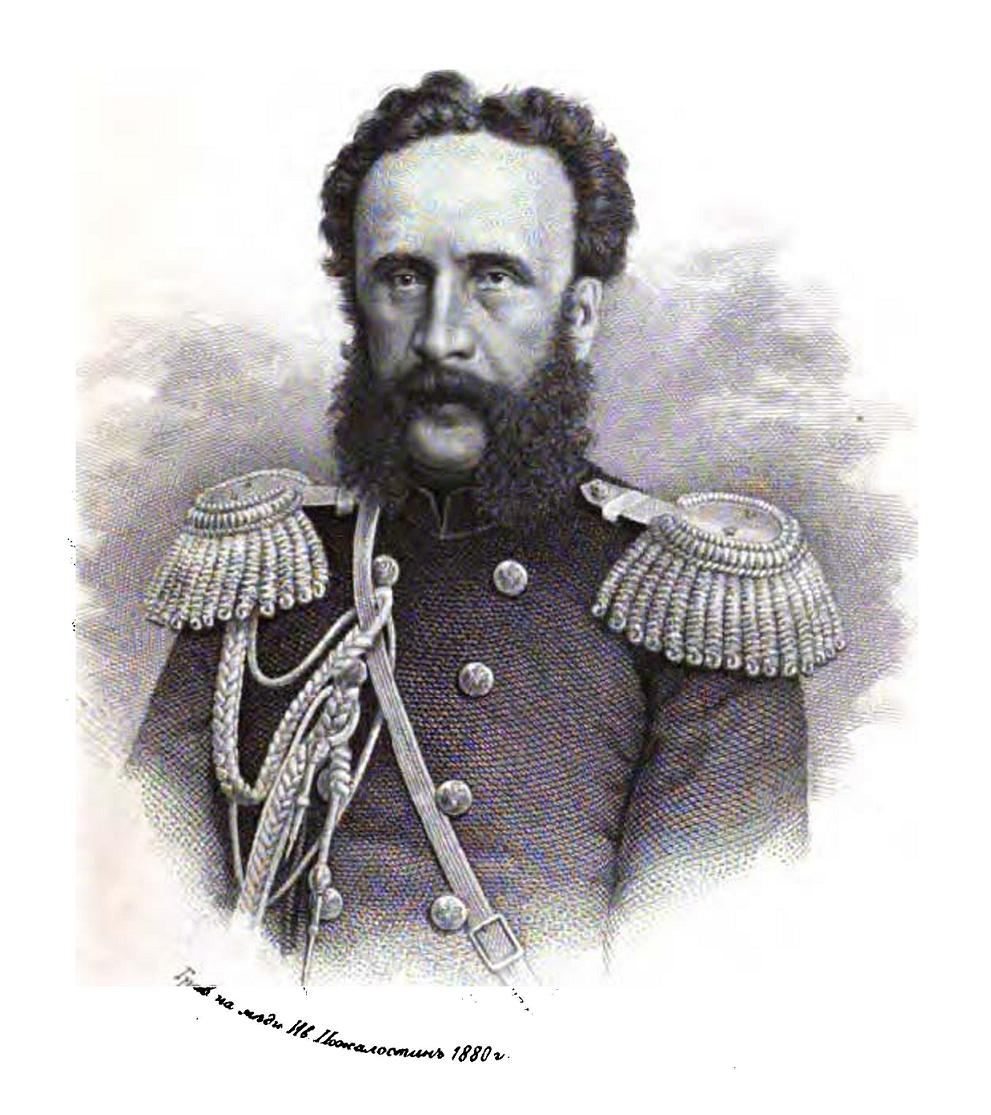
- Born: 1 September [O.S. 20 August] 1816; Staroye Kurovo, Vyshnevolotsky Uyezd, Tver Governorate, Russian Empire
- Died: 20 July [O.S. 8 July] 1875; Kurovo, Vyshnevolotsky Uyezd, Tver Governorate, Russian Empire
- Education: Engineering School of Nikolai
- Occupations: linguist, ethnographer, caucasologist
- Known for: Works on Caucasian languages, as well as creation of first alphabets for them
- Spouse: Sofiya Krabbe (died in 1843)
- Parents: Karl Uslar (father); Vera Chikhachëva (mother)
- Relatives: Karl Uslar (grandfather)
- Military career
- Allegiance: Russia
- Branch: Imperial Russian Army
- Service years: 1837-1875
- Rank: Major General
- Awards: Order of St. George, 4th class, Order of St. Anne, 1st class, Order of St. Anne, 3rd class, Order of St. Stanislau, 1st class, Order of St. Vladimir, 3rd class, Order of St. Vladimir, 4th class

Signature
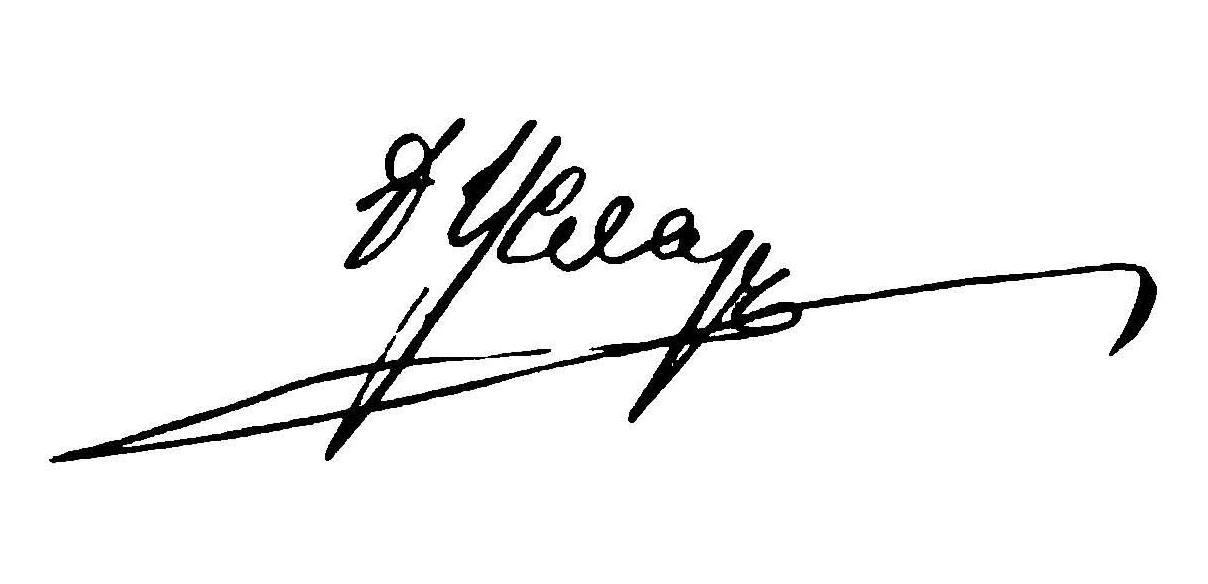

Baron Pyotr Karlovich Uslar (Russian: Пётр Карлович Услар, IPA: [ˈpʲɵtr kərɫəvʲɪt͡ɕ ʊsɫər]), (Note: Pre-reform orthography: Пётръ Карловичъ Усларъ.) known by his German name Peter von Uslar (1 September [O.S. 20 August] 1816 – 20 July [O.S. 8 July] 1875), was a Russian general, engineer and linguist of German descent, known for his research of languages and ethnography of peoples of Caucasus.

== Biography ==
Peter von Uslar was born on 1 September [O.S. 20 August] 1816 in Kurovo manor in Vyshnevolotsky District, Tver Governorate, Russian Empire. His grandfather was a native of Hanover who in 1765 moved to Russia and subsequently joined the ranks of Imperial Russian Army.

After graduating from the Chief Engineering School, he graduated from the General Staff Academy and did not have formal education in linguistics.

In 1850 he was appointed member of the Caucasus Department of the Russian Geographical Society and ordered to compile the history of the Caucasus region. This appointment had eventually led to his interest in researching of Caucasian languages and to his tremendous contribution into the recording of numerous Caucasian languages from various linguistic groups, such as Abkhaz, Ubykh, Svan, Chechen, Avar, Lak, Tabasaran, Lezgian, Dargin, etc.

== Bibliography ==
=== Russian sources ===
- Загурский, Л. П. (1881). "Петр Карлович Услар и его деятельность на Кавказе" [Petr Karlovich Uslar and his activities in the Caucasus]. Древние сказания о Кавказе [Ancient legends about the Caucasus] (in Russian). Тифлис: Изд. Кавк. воен.-нар. упр. pp. I–LXXXIII.
- Майсак, А. М. (7 June 2022). "Услар Пётр Карлович" [Uslar Pëtr Karlovich]. Great Russian Encyclopedia (in Russian).
