= Novy Kostek =

Novy Kostek Новый Костек
- Selo
- Location within Republic of Dagestan Location within Russia
- Coordinates: 43°20′N 46°49′E
- Country: Russia
- Region: Republic of Dagestan
- District: Khasavyurtovsky District
- Time zone: UTC+3:00

Novy Kostek (Russian: Новый Костек) is a rural locality (a selo) in Khasavyurtovsky District, Republic of Dagestan, Russia. Population: 5,502 (2021 census); 3,736 (2002 census); 2,189 (1989 Soviet census). There are 39 streets.

== Geography ==
Novy Kostek is located 27 km northeast of Khasavyurt (the district's administrative centre) by road. Kostek is the nearest rural locality.
