= Novokare =

Novokare Новокаре Беш-юрт
- Selo
- Location within Republic of Dagestan Location within Russia
- Coordinates: 43°36′N 46°57′E
- Country: Russia
- Region: Republic of Dagestan
- District: Babayurtovsky District
- Time zone: UTC+3:00

Novokare (Russian: Новокаре; Kumyk: Беш-юрт, Beş-yurt) is a rural locality (a selo) in Babayurtovsky District, Republic of Dagestan, Russia. The population was 1,393 as of 2010. There are 23 streets. It was founded in 1954.

== Geography ==
Novokare is located 26 km east of Babayurt (the district's administrative centre) by road. Tatayurt is the nearest rural locality.
