= Tsumada =

Tsumada Цумада
- Selo
- Location within Republic of Dagestan Location within Russia
- Coordinates: 42°28′N 46°03′E
- Country: Russia
- Region: Republic of Dagestan
- District: Tsumadinsky District
- Time zone: UTC+3:00

Tsumada (Russian: Цумада) is a rural locality (a selo) in Tsumadinsky District, Republic of Dagestan, Russia. Population: 119 (2021 census); 120 (2002 census); 74 (1989 Soviet census). There are 2 streets in this selo.

== Geography ==
It is located 9 km from Agvali (the district's administrative centre), 130 km from Makhachkala (capital of Dagestan) and 1,630 km from Moscow. Issi is the nearest rural locality.
