= Shangoda =

Shangoda Шангода Шамгъуда
- Selo
- Location within Republic of Dagestan Location within Russia
- Coordinates: 42°14′N 46°59′E
- Country: Russia
- Region: Republic of Dagestan
- District: Gunibsky District
- Time zone: UTC+3:00

Shangoda (Russian: Шангода; Avar: Шамгъуда) is a rural locality (a selo) and the administrative centre of Shangodinsky Selsoviet, Gunibsky District, Republic of Dagestan, Russia. The population was 517 as of 2010. There are 2 streets.

== Geography ==
Shangoda is located 28 km southeast of Gunib (the district's administrative centre) by road, on the Kunekh River. Shitli and Bukhty are the nearest rural localities.

== Nationalities ==
Avars live there.
