= Voiceless epiglottal fricative =

Consonantal sound represented by ⟨ʜ⟩ in IPA

ʜ
- IPA number: 172

Audio sample
- source · help

Encoding
- Entity (decimal): &#668;
- Unicode (hex): U+029C
- X-SAMPA: H\
- Braille: ⠔ (braille pattern dots-35) ⠓ (braille pattern dots-125)
Image

A voiceless epiglottal fricative, or voiceless pharyngeal trill, is a type of consonantal sound, used in some spoken languages. The symbol in the International Phonetic Alphabet that represents this sound is ⟨ʜ⟩, a small capital ⟨h⟩; it is homoglyphic with the lowercase Cyrillic letter En (н).

Although the official name in the IPA for this sound has always been a voiceless epiglottal fricative since it was introduced in 1989, laryngoscopic studies by John Esling have found that both epiglottal and pharyngeal consonants are pharyngeal in place of articulation, and are affected in manner by the aryepiglottic folds and larynx height; he therefore proposed the reclassification of ⟨ʜ⟩ as the trilled counterpart of ⟨ħ⟩, noting both as fricatives, and later described realizations of ⟨ʜ⟩ ranging from a fricative, to a trill, to a fricative trill. Esling furthered this reclassification with a modified version of the IPA chart, merging pharyngeal and epiglottal consonants into a single column, placing ⟨ʜ⟩ as a trill and ⟨ħ⟩ as a fricative.

In Dahalo, ⟨ʜ⟩ is reported to have partial voicing intervocalically, resulting in the consonant appearing as a partially voiced epiglottal approximant, which can be transcribed with the extIPA symbol for partial voicing as ⟨ʜ̬᪽᫛⟩. This is distinguished from a fully voiced epiglottal approximant in having a less dramatic effect on the fundamental frequency (F_{0}).

== Features ==
Features of a voiceless epiglottal fricative:

- Its manner of articulation is fricative, which means it is produced by constricting air flow through a narrow channel at the place of articulation, causing turbulence.
- Its place of articulation is epiglottal, which means it is articulated with the aryepiglottic folds against the epiglottis.
- Its phonation is voiceless, which means it is produced without vibrations of the vocal cords. In some languages the vocal cords are actively separated, so it is always voiceless; in others the cords are lax, so that it may take on the voicing of adjacent sounds.
- It is an oral consonant, which means that air is not allowed to escape through the nose.
- It is a median consonant, which means it is produced by directing the airstream down the midline of the tongue, rather than to the sides.
- Its airstream mechanism is pulmonic, which means it is articulated by pushing air only with the intercostal muscles and abdominal muscles, as in most speech sounds.

== Occurrence ==
Language		Word	IPA	Meaning	Notes
Agul		мехӏ	[mɛʜ]	'whey'	
Amis		tihi	[tiʜiʔ]	'spouse'	The epiglottal consonants in Amis have proven hard to describe, with some describing it not as epiglottal, but a pharyngeal fricative or even as a uvular consonant. See Amis phonology
Arabic	Iraqi	حَي	[ʜaj]	'alive'	Corresponds to /ħ/ ⟨ح⟩ in Standard Arabic. See Arabic phonology
Bengali		খড়	[ʜↄɾ]	'straw'	Mainly realized as such in very eastern regions; often also debuccalized or phonetically realised as /x/. Corresponds to /kʰ/ in western and central dialects. See Bengali phonology
Chechen		хьо/ حُؤ	[ʜʷɔ]	'you'	
Dahalo			[ʜaːɗo]	'arrow'	
Haida		x̱ants	[ʜʌnt͡s]	'shadow'	
Somali		xoor/ حور	[ʜoːɾ]	'bubble'	Realization of /ħ/ for some speakers. See Somali phonology

== See also ==
- Index of phonetics articles

== Notes ==
Place →	Labial					Coronal										Dorsal					Laryngeal			
Manner ↓	Bilabial		Labiodental		Linguolabial		Dental		Alveolar		Postalveolar		Retroflex		(Alveolo-)palatal		Velar		Uvular		Pharyngeal/epiglottal		Glottal	
Nasal	m̥	m	ɱ̊	ɱ		n̼	n̪̊	n̪	n̥	n	n̠̊	n̠	ɳ̊	ɳ	ɲ̊	ɲ	ŋ̊	ŋ	ɴ̥	ɴ				
Plosive	p	b	p̪	b̪	t̼	d̼	t̪	d̪	t	d			ʈ	ɖ	c	ɟ	k	ɡ	q	ɢ	ʡ		ʔ	
Sibilant affricate							t̪s̪	d̪z̪	ts	dz	t̠ʃ	d̠ʒ	tʂ	dʐ	tɕ	dʑ								
Non-sibilant affricate	pɸ	bβ	p̪f	b̪v			t̪θ	d̪ð	tɹ̝̊	dɹ̝	t̠ɹ̠̊˔	d̠ɹ̠˔			cç	ɟʝ	kx	ɡɣ	qχ	ɢʁ	ʡʜ	ʡʢ	ʔh	
Sibilant fricative							s̪	z̪	s	z	ʃ	ʒ	ʂ	ʐ	ɕ	ʑ								
Non-sibilant fricative	ɸ	β	f	v	θ̼	ð̼	θ	ð	θ̠	ð̠	ɹ̠̊˔	ɹ̠˔	ɻ̊˔	ɻ˔	ç	ʝ	x	ɣ	χ	ʁ	ħ	ʕ	h	ɦ
Approximant		β̞		ʋ				ð̞		ɹ		ɹ̠		ɻ		j		ɰ						˷
Tap/flap		ⱱ̟		ⱱ					ɾ̥	ɾ			ɽ̊	ɽ						ɢ̆		ʡ̆		
Trill	ʙ̥	ʙ							r̥	r		r̠	ɽ̊r̥	ɽr					ʀ̥	ʀ	ʜ	ʢ		
Lateral affricate									tɬ	dɮ			tꞎ	d𝼅	c𝼆	ɟʎ̝	k𝼄	ɡʟ̝						
Lateral fricative							ɬ̪		ɬ	ɮ			ꞎ	𝼅	𝼆	ʎ̝	𝼄	ʟ̝						
Lateral approximant								l̪	l̥	l		l̠	ɭ̊	ɭ	ʎ̥	ʎ	ʟ̥	ʟ		ʟ̠				
Lateral tap/flap									ɺ̥	ɺ			𝼈̊	𝼈		ʎ̆		ʟ̆						

		BL	LD	D	A	PA	RF	P	V	U
Implosive	Voiced	ɓ			ɗ		ᶑ	ʄ	ɠ	ʛ
Implosive	Voiceless	ɓ̥			ɗ̥		ᶑ̊	ʄ̊	ɠ̊	ʛ̥
Ejective	Stop	pʼ			tʼ		ʈʼ	cʼ	kʼ	qʼ
Ejective	Affricate		p̪fʼ	tθʼ	tsʼ	tʃʼ	tʂʼ	tɕʼ	kxʼ	qχʼ
Ejective	Fricative	ɸʼ	fʼ	θʼ	sʼ	ʃʼ	ʂʼ	ɕʼ	xʼ	χʼ
Ejective	Lateral affricate				tɬʼ			c𝼆ʼ	k𝼄ʼ	q𝼄ʼ
Ejective	Lateral fricative				ɬʼ					
Click (top: velar; bottom: uvular)	Tenuis	kʘ qʘ		kǀ qǀ	kǃ qǃ		k𝼊 q𝼊	kǂ qǂ		
Click (top: velar; bottom: uvular)	Voiced	ɡʘ ɢʘ		ɡǀ ɢǀ	ɡǃ ɢǃ		ɡ𝼊 ɢ𝼊	ɡǂ ɢǂ		
Click (top: velar; bottom: uvular)	Nasal	ŋʘ ɴʘ		ŋǀ ɴǀ	ŋǃ ɴǃ		ŋ𝼊 ɴ𝼊	ŋǂ ɴǂ	ʞ	
Click (top: velar; bottom: uvular)	Tenuis lateral				kǁ qǁ					
Click (top: velar; bottom: uvular)	Voiced lateral				ɡǁ ɢǁ					
Click (top: velar; bottom: uvular)	Nasal lateral				ŋǁ ɴǁ					
