= Northeast Caucasian languages =

Language family

Northeast Caucasian
- East Caucasian; Nakh-Daghestani; North Caspian; Caspian; Vainakh-Daghestani
- Geographic distribution: Caucasus
- Ethnicity: Northeast Caucasian peoples
- Linguistic classification: One of the world's primary language families
- Proto-language: Proto-Northeast Caucasian
- Subdivisions: Avar–Andic; Dargic; Khinalug; Lak; Lezgic; Nakh; Tsezic (Didoic)

Language codes
- Glottolog: nakh1245
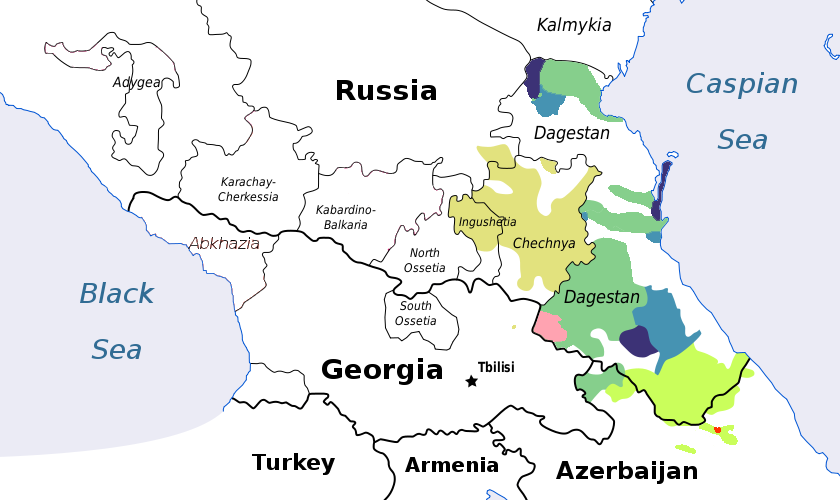
- Avar–Andic Dargic Khinalug Lak Lezgic Nakh Tsezic

The Northeast Caucasian languages (Note: also called East Caucasian, Nakh-Daghestani, Vainakh-Daghestani, North Caspian, or sometimes Caspian languages (from the Caspian Sea, in contrast to Pontic languages for the Northwest Caucasian languages)) are a family of languages primarily spoken in the three Russian republics of Dagestan, Chechnya and Ingushetia, with smaller populations in northern Azerbaijan as well as in Georgia, and significant diaspora in Western Europe and West Asia.

According to Glottolog, there are currently 35 Nakh-Dagestanian languages, not counting those which are typically considered predecessors rather than sister branches to modern languages.

== Name of the family ==
Main areas of Northeast Caucasian languages

Several names have been in use for this family. The most common term, Northeast Caucasian, contrasts the three established families of the Caucasian languages: Northeast Caucasian, Northwest Caucasian (Abkhaz–Adyghean) and South Caucasian (Kartvelian). This may be shortened to East Caucasian. The term Nakh(o)-Dagestanian can be taken to reflect a primary division of the family into Nakh and Dagestanian branches, a view which is no longer widely accepted, or Dagestanian can subsume the entire family. The rare term North Caspian (as in bordering the Caspian Sea) is only used in opposition to the use of North Pontic (as in bordering the Black Sea) for the Northwest Caucasian languages.

== Linguistic features ==
=== Phonology ===
Historically, Northeast Caucasian phonemic inventories were thought to be smaller than those of the neighboring Northwest Caucasian family. However, more recent research has revealed that many Northeast Caucasian languages are much more phoneme-rich than previously believed, with some languages containing as many as 70 consonants.

In addition to numerous front obstruents, many Northeast Caucasian languages also possess a number of back consonants, including uvulars, pharyngeals, and glottal stops and fricatives. Northeast Caucasian phonology is also notable for its use of numerous secondary articulations as contrastive features. Whereas English consonant classes are divided into voiced and voiceless phonemes, Northeast Caucasian languages are known to contrast voiced, voiceless, ejective and tense phones, which contributes to their large phonemic inventories. Some languages also include palatalization and labialization as contrastive features. Most languages in this family contrast tense and weak consonants. Tense consonants are characterized by the intensiveness of articulation, which naturally leads to a lengthening of these consonants.

In contrast to the generally large consonant inventories of Northeast Caucasian languages, most languages in the family have relatively few vowels, although more on average than the Northwest Caucasian languages. However, there are some exceptions to this trend, such as Chechen, which has at least twenty-eight vowels, diphthongs and triphthongs.

Percentage of Northeast Caucasian languages by speakers
1. Chechen (33.6%)
2. Avar (18.9%)
3. Lezgian (16.3%)
4. Dargwa (12.1%)
5. Ingush (8.00%)
6. Lak (3.80%)
7. Others (7.30%)

=== Morphology ===
These languages can be characterized by strong suffixal agglutination. Weak tendencies towards inflection may be noted as well. Nouns display covert nominal classification, but partially overt cases of secondary origin can be observed too. The number of noun classes in individual languages range from two to eight. Regarding grammatical number, there may be a distinction between singular and plural, plurality itself may impact the class to which a noun belongs. In some cases, a grammatical collective is seen. Many languages distinguish local versus functional cases, and to some degree also casus rectus versus casus obliquus.

The inflectional paradigms are often based on partially classifying productive stem extensions (absolutive and oblique, ergative and genitive inflection.) Localization is mostly conveyed by postpositions, but it can be also partly based on preverbs. Noun phrases exhibit incomplete class agreement, group inflection (on the noun) with partial attributive oblique marking, which may, in turn, carry a partially determining function.

Verbs do not agree with person, with a few exceptions like Lak, in which first and second persons are marked with the same suffix and verbs agree with the P argument, and Hunzib in which verbs agree with A argument. Evidentiality is prominent, with reported, sensory and epistemic moods all appearing as a way of conveying the evidence. Epistemic modality is often tied to the tense.

==== Ergativity ====
Most Northeast Caucasian languages exhibit an ergative–absolutive morphology. This means that objects of transitive sentences and subjects of intransitive sentences both fall into a single grammatical case known as the absolutive. Subjects of transitive sentences, however, carry a different marking to indicate that they belong to a separate case, known as the ergative. This distinction can be seen in the following two Archi sentences. Objects and subjects of intransitive sentences carry no suffix, which is represented by the null suffix, -∅. Meanwhile, agents of transitive sentences take the ergative suffix, -mu.

Intransitive sentence	Transitive sentence
buwa-∅ d-irxːin Mother-∅ II.SG-work; Mother works.	buwa-mu xːalli-∅ b-ar-ši b-i mother-ERG bread-∅ III.SG-bake-PROG II.SG-AUX; Mother is baking the bread.

==== Noun classes ====
Northeast Caucasian languages have between two and eight noun classes. In these languages, nouns are grouped into grammatical categories depending on certain semantic qualities, such as animacy and gender. Each noun class has a corresponding agreement prefix, which can attach to verbs or adjectives of that noun. Prefixes may also have plural forms, used in agreement with a plural noun. The following table shows the noun–adjective agreement paradigm in the Tsez language.

Noun class	Adjectival phrase example
I (men)	Ø-igu aħo I.AGR.SG-good shepherd Good shepherd
II (women)	y-igu baru II.AGR.SG-good wife Good wife
III (animals and inanimates)	b-igu ʕomoy III.AGR.SG-good donkey Good donkey
IV (other inanimates)	r-igu ʕoƛ' IV.AGR.SG-good spindle Good spindle

In many Northeast Caucasian languages, as well as appearing on adjectives and verbs, agreement can also be found on parts of speech which are not usually able to agree in other language families – for example on adverbs, postpositions, particles, and even case-marked nouns and pronouns. In the example from Archi below, doːʕzub 'big' and abu 'made', but also the adverb ditːabu 'quickly' and the personal pronouns nenabu 'we' and belabu 'to us', all agree in number and gender with the argument in the absolutive case, χʕon 'cow'.

nena<b>u doːʕzu-b χʕon b-ela<b>u ditːa<b>u χir a<b>u
1PL.INCL.ERG<III.SG> be.big.ATTR-III.SG cow(III)[SG.ABS] III.SG-1PL.INCL.DAT<III.SG> quickly<III.SG> behind <III.SG>make.PFV
'We quickly drove the big cow to us (home).'

This kind of clausal agreement has been labelled 'external agreement'. The same term is also used for the (cross-linguistically even rarer) phenomenon where a converb agrees with an argument which lies outside the converb's own clause. This is seen in the following example from Northern Akhvakh, where mīʟō 'not having gone' has a masculine adverbial suffix (-ō), agreeing with hugu ek'wa 'the man'.

[ĩk'a ri-da-la m-īʟ-ō] hu-gu ek'wa-la w-uʟ'-u-wudi.
long time-INT-ADD N-go.NEG-M[ADV] DIST-LL man-ADD M-die-M-PF3
'Shortly after that (lit. 'long time not having gone'), the man died.'

== Language classification ==
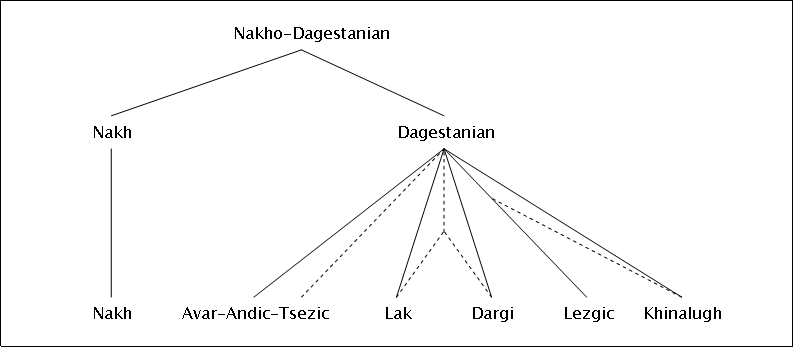
Traditional classification (Nichols (2003))

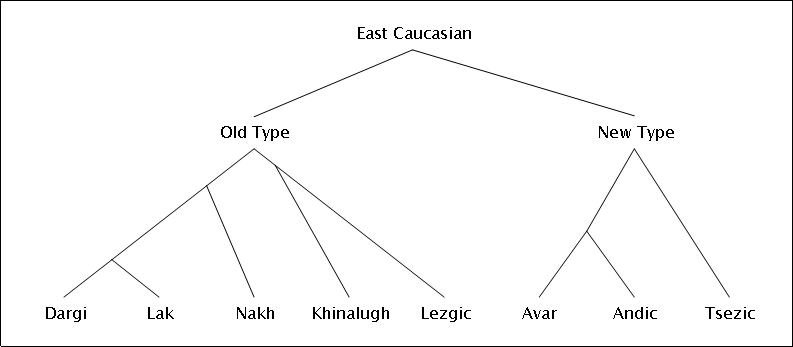
Latest attempt at internal classification (Schulze (2009))

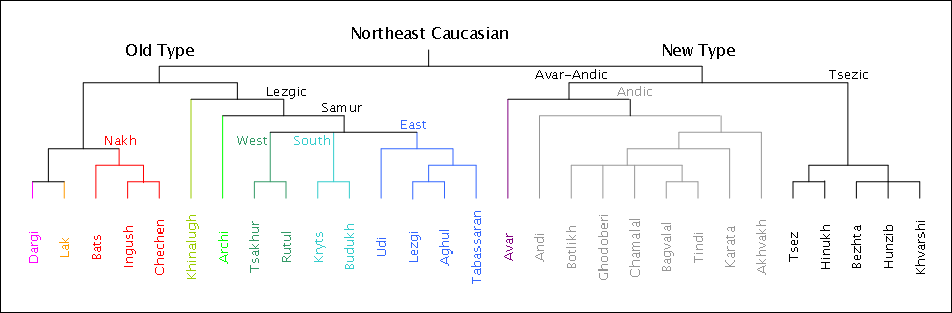
Branching without relative chronology (Schulze (2009))

A long-time classification divided the family into Nakh and Dagestanian branches, whence the term Nakho-Dagestanian. However, attempts at reconstructing the protolanguage suggest that the Nakh languages are no more divergent from Dagestanian than the various branches of Dagestanian are from each other, although this is still not universally accepted. The following outline, based on the work of linguist Bernard Comrie and others, has been adopted by Ethnologue. An Avar–Andi–Dido branch was abandoned, but has been resurrected as the "New Type" languages in Schulze (2009, 2013) and Lak–Dargwa has likewise returned.

One factor complicating internal classification within the family is that the diachronic development of its respective branches is marked both by an extreme degree of diffusion and divergence followed by secondary convergence, which complicates the comparative method.

Population data is from Ethnologue 16th ed.

=== Avar–Andic family ===
Spoken in the Northwest Dagestan highlands and western Dagestan. Avar is the lingua franca for these and the Tsezic languages and is the only literary language. Schulze (2009) gives the following family tree for the Avar–Andic languages:

- Avar–Andic family
  - Avar (761,960)
  - Andic languages
    - Andi (Qwannab) (5,800)
    - Akhvakh–Tindi
      - Akhvakh (210 as of 2010)
      - Karata–Tindi
        - Karata (Kirdi) (260 as of 2010)
        - Botlikh–Tindi
          - Botlikh (210 as of 2010)
          - Godoberi (130 as of 2010)
          - Chamalal (500 as of 2010)
          - Bagvalal–Tindi
            - Bagvalal (1,450)
            - Tindi (2,150)

Figures retrieved from Ethnologue. These languages are spoken in the following rayons of Dagestan: Axvax, Botlikh, Buynaksk (Shura), Čarodinsky (Tsurib), Gergebil, Gumbetovsky (Baklul), Gunib, Karabudaxkent, Kazbekovsky (Dylym), Lavaša, Tsumada (Agvali), Untsukul, Xebda, Xunzaq and Zaqatala rayon in Azerbaijan.

=== Dargic (Dargin) dialect continuum ===
Spoken by 492,490 in Dagestan, as well as Azerbaijan, Central Asia and Ukraine. Dargwa proper is a literary language.

Dargin

  - Northern-central group
    - Mehweb (1,300)
    - Gapshima (2,300)
    - Muira (35,000)
    - Tsudaqar-Usisha-Butri
      - Tsudaqar (35,000)
      - Usisha-Butri (8,000)
    - Northern Dargwa (133,000)
      - Kadar
      - Murego-Gubden
      - Mugi
      - Upper Mulebki
      - Aqusha
        - Aqusha proper
        - Levashi
      - Urakhi
  - Southern group
    - Ashti-Kubachi
      - Ashti
      - Kubachi
    - Sanzhi-Itsari (1,500-2,000)
      - Sanzhi
      - Itsari
    - Sanakari-Chakhrizhi (900, unclassified)
    - Amuzgi-Shiri (1,500-2,000)
      - Amuzgi
      - Shiri
    - Southwestern Dargwa (14,000)
      - Tanti (800)
      - Sirhwa
      - Upper Vurkuni
  - Chirag (2,100-2,400)
  - Kaitag group
    - Shari (1,200)
    - Kaitag (24,000)

Dargwa is spoken in the following rayons of Dagestan: Aquša, Kaitak, Kayakent, Kubači, Sergokala. Figures derived from Koryakov 2021.

=== Khinalug (Xinalug) isolate ===
Spoken in Quba region of Azerbaijan.

- Khinalug (Xinalug) (1,000 speakers)

=== Lak isolate ===
Spoken in the Central Dagestan highlands. Lak is a literary language.

- Lak (152,000 speakers)

Lak is spoken in two rayons of Dagestan: Kumux and Kuli (Vači).

=== Lezgic family ===
Spoken in the Southeast Dagestan highlands and in Northern Azerbaijan. The Lezgian language or, as the Lezgian people themselves call it, Лезги чlал (lezgi ch'al), is the biggest in terms of the number of native speakers of all the languages of the Lezgic group (other languages from this group include Aghul, Tabasaran, Udi, Tsakhur and Rutul). They are spoken in the following rayons of Dagestan: Agul, Akhty, Derbent (Kvevar), Suleyman-Stalsky, Kurakh, Magaramkent, Rutul, Tabasaran, Usukhchay, Khiv and Qusar, Khamchmaz, Quba, Qabala, Oguz, Ismayilli and Zaqatala in Azerbaijan.

Tabasaran was once thought to be the language with the largest number of grammatical cases at 54, which could, depending on the analysis, instead be the Tsez language with 64.

Lezgi, Agul, Rutul, Tabasaran, Tsakhur and Udi are literary languages.

- Lezgic family
  - Peripheral: Archi (970 speakers)
  - Samur (or Nuclear Lezgian)
    - Eastern Samur
      - Tabasaran (128,900)
      - Lezgian (655,000)
      - Aghul (29,300)
      - Udi (6,590)
    - Southern Samur
      - Kryts (5,000)
      - Budukh (1,000)
    - Western Samur
      - Rutul (47,400)
      - Tsakhur (23,673)

All figures retrieved from Ethnologue.

=== Nakh family ===
Spoken in Chechnya, Ingushetia and Georgia. Chechen and Ingush are official languages of their respective republics.

- Nakh family
  - Bats (3,420 speakers in Georgia in 2000)
  - Vainakh languages
    - Chechen (1,350,000)
    - Ingush (322,900)

=== Tsezic (Didoic) family ===
Spoken mostly in Southwest Dagestan. None are literary languages. Formerly classified geographically as East Tsezic (Hinukh, Bezta) and West Tsezic (Tsez, Khwarshi, Hunzib), these languages may actually form different subgroupings according to the latest research by Schulze (2009):

- Tsezic family
  - Tsez–Hinukh
    - Tsez (Dido) (17,574)
    - Hinukh (Hinux, Ginukh) (635)
  - Bezhta–Hunzib–Khwarshi
    - Bezhta (Kapucha) (8,138)
    - Hunzib (Gunzib) (3,466)
    - Khwarshi (Khvarshi) (8,500)

All figures except for Khwarshi were retrieved from the 2021 Russian census. These languages are spoken in the Tsunta and Bezhta areas of Dagestan.

== Disputed connections to other families ==
=== North Caucasian family ===
Some linguists such as Sergei Starostin think that the Northeast and Northwest Caucasian languages are part of a wider North Caucasian family, citing shared vocabulary and typological features as evidence. This proposed family does not include the neighboring Kartvelian languages. This hypothesis is questioned by some linguists.

=== Connections to Hurrian and Urartian ===
Some linguists—notably Igor M. Diakonoff and Starostin—see evidence of a genealogical connection between the Northeast Caucasian family and the extinct languages Hurrian and Urartian. Hurrian was spoken in various parts of the Fertile Crescent in the 3rd and 2nd millennia BC. Urartian was the language of Urartu, a powerful state that existed between 1000 BC or earlier and 585 BC in the area centered on Lake Van in current Turkey. The two languages are classified together as the Hurro-Urartian family. Diakonoff proposed the name Alarodian for the inclusion of Hurro-Urartian into Northeast Caucasian.

Some scholars, however, doubt that the language families are related or believe that, while a connection is possible, the evidence is far from conclusive.

== Proto-language ==
Proto-Northeast Caucasian
- Proto-Nakh-Dagestanian
- Reconstruction of: Northeast Caucasian languages

Below are selected Proto-Northeast Caucasian reconstructions of basic vocabulary items by Johanna Nichols, which she refers to as Proto-Nakh-Daghestanian.

gloss	Proto-Nakh-Daghestanian
eye	*(b)ul, *(b)al
tooth	*cVl-
tongue	*maʒ-i
hand, arm	*kV, *kol-
back (of body)	*D=uqq'
heart	*rVk'u / *Vrk'u
bile, gall	*sttim
meat	*(CV)=(lV)ƛƛ'
bear (animal)	*sVʔin / *cVʔin / *čVʔin
sun	*bVrVg
moon	*baʒVr / *buʒVr
earth	*(l)ončči
water	*ɬɬin
fire	*c'ar(i), *c'ad(i)
ashes	*rV=uqq' / *rV=uƛƛ'
road	*D=eqq' / *D=aqq'
name	*cc'Vr, *cc'Vri
die, kill	*D=Vƛ'
burn	*D=Vk'
know	*(=D=)Vc'
black	*alč'i- (*ʕalč'i-)
long, far	*(CV=)RVxx-
round	*goRg / *gog-R-
dry	*D=aqq'(u) / *D=uqq'
thin	*(C)=uƛ'Vl-
what	*sti-
one	*cV (*cʕV ?)
five	*(W)=ƛƛi / *ƛƛwi

Notation: C = consonant; V = vowel; D = gender affix

=== Possible connections to the origin of agriculture ===
The Proto-Northeast Caucasian language had many terms for agriculture and Johanna Nichols has suggested that its speakers may have been involved in the development of agriculture in the Fertile Crescent and only later moved north to the Caucasus. Proto-NEC is reconstructed with words for concepts such as yoke (*...ƛ / *...ƛƛ'), as well as fruit trees such as apple (*hʕam(V)c / *hʕam(V)č) and pear (*qur / *qar; *qʕur ?), that suggest agriculture was well developed before the proto-language broke up.

=== Phonology ===
A reconstructed phonology is given below from Diakonoff and Starostin (1986).

The typical structure of a root is given as *CV(S)CV, if labialized and reduplicated phonemes are regarded as singular phonemes.

==== Consonants ====
			Consonants				Sonants	
			voiceless (aspirated)	intensive (unaspirated)	glottalized	voiced	liquid	nasal
Labial	stop		p	pː	pʼ	b		m
Labial	fricative		f	fː			w w_{1} (Note: The phonetic difference between w and w_{1} is unclear.)	
Dental	stop		t	tː	tʼ	d	r	n
Dental	fricative	plain	s	sː		z		
Dental	fricative	pal.	sʲ	sʲː		zʲ	j	
Dental	affricate	pal.	t͡ɕ	t͡ɕː	t͡ɕʼ	d͡ʑ		
Dental	bifocal fricative		ʃ	ʃː		ʒ		
Dental	bifocal affricate		t͡ʃ	t͡ʃː	t͡ʃʼ	d͡ʒ		
Lateral	fricative		ɬ	ɬː		ɮ	l l_{1} (Note: The phonetic difference between l and l_{1} is unclear.)	
Lateral	affricate		t͡ɬ	t͡ɬː	t͡ɬʼ	d͡ɮ		
Velar	stop		k	kː	kʼ	g		
Velar	fricative		x	xː		ɣ		
Uvular	stop (affricate)	plain	q	qː	qʼ	ɢ		
Uvular	stop (affricate)	phar.	q	qː	qʼˤ	ɢ		
Uvular	fricative	plain	χ	χː		ʁ		
Uvular	fricative	phar.	χˤ	χːˤ		ʁˤ		
Pharyngeal	stop					ʡ		
Pharyngeal	fricative		ħ			ʕ		
Glottal	miscellaneous		h	ʔ				

==== Vowels ====
	Front		Central	Back
	unrounded	rounded	Central	Back
High	i i:	y y:	ɨ ɨ:	u u:
Mid	e e:		ə ǝ:	o o:
Low	æ æ:			a a:

Vowels were either short or long.

== See also ==
- Northwest Caucasian languages
- North Caucasian languages
