= Dargwa language =

Northeast Caucasian language

Dargwa
- дарган мез dargan mez دارگان مەڞ
- Native to: North Caucasus
- Region: Dagestan
- Ethnicity: 630,000 Dargins (2020 census)
- Native speakers: 590,000 (2020 census, all Dargin languages)
- Language family: Northeast Caucasian: Dargin; North-Central; North Dargwa; Aqusha and Urakhi; Dargwa
- Writing system: Cyrillic

Official status
- Official language in: Russia: Dagestan

Language codes
- ISO 639-2: dar
- ISO 639-3: dar (also Dargin languages)
- Glottolog: darg1241
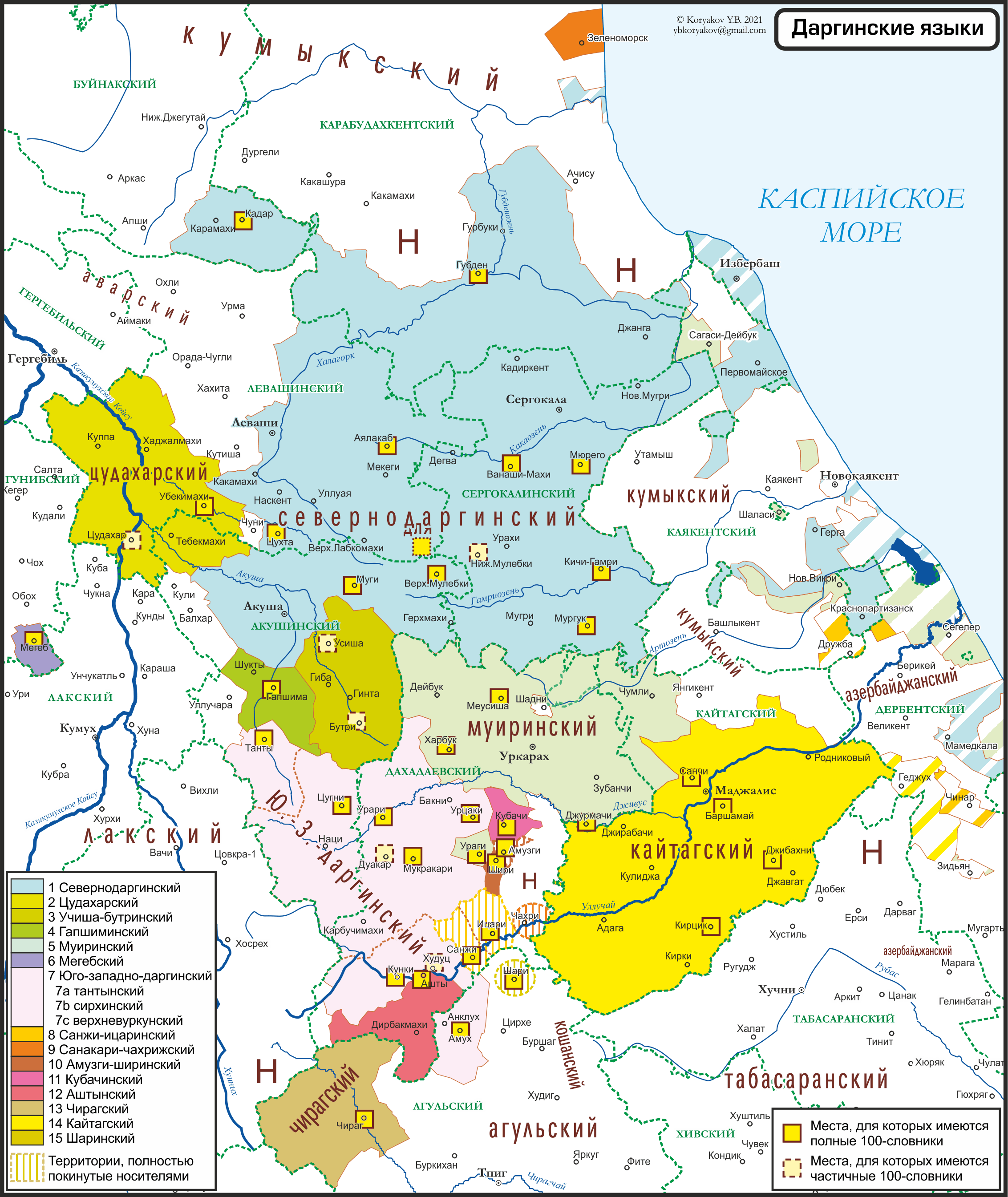
- Map of all Dargin varieties

Dargwa (дарган мез, dargan mez) is a Northeast Caucasian language spoken by the Dargin people in the Russian republic Dagestan. This article discusses the literary dialect of the dialect continuum constituting the Dargin languages. It is based on the Aqusha and Urakhi dialects of Northern Dargin.

== Classification ==
Dargwa is part of a Northeast Caucasian dialect continuum, the Dargin languages. The other languages in this dialect continuum (such as Kajtak, Kubachi, Itsari, and Chirag) are often considered variants of Dargwa, but also sometimes considered separate languages by certain scholars. Korjakov (2012) concludes that Southwestern Dargwa is closer to Kajtak than it is to North-Central Dargwa.

== Geographic distribution ==
According to the 2002 Census, there are 429,347 speakers of Dargwa proper in Dagestan, 7,188 in neighbouring Kalmykia, 1,620 in Khanty–Mansi AO, 680 in Chechnya, and hundreds more in other parts of Russia. Figures for the Lakh dialect spoken in central Dagestan are 142,523 in Dagestan, 1,504 in Kabardino-Balkaria, 708 in Khanty–Mansi.

== Phonology ==
=== Consonants ===
Like other languages of the Caucasus, Dargwa is noted for its large consonant inventory, which includes over 40 phonemes (distinct sounds), though the exact number varies by dialect. Voicing, glottalization (as ejectives), fortition (which surfaces as gemination), and frication are some of the distinct features of consonants in Dargwa. The following chart is of the literary dialect of Dargwa.

		Labial	Dental		Postalveolar	Palatal	Velar	Uvular	Pharyngeal/ Epiglottal	Glottal
		Labial	plain	sib.	Postalveolar	Palatal	Velar	Uvular	Pharyngeal/ Epiglottal	Glottal
Nasal		m	n							
Plosive/ Affricate	voiceless	p	t	t͡s	t͡ʃ		k	q		ʔ
Plosive/ Affricate	ejective	pʼ	tʼ	t͡sʼ	t͡ʃʼ		kʼ	qʼ		
Plosive/ Affricate	voiced	b	d	d͡z	d͡ʒ		ɡ	ɢ	ʡ	
Fricative	voiceless	f	s		ʃ	ç	x^{1}	χ	ʜ	
Fricative	voiced	v	z		ʒ		ɣ	ʁ	ʢ	ɦ
Trill					r					
Approximant		w	l			j				

1. Mainly heard as an allophone of /ç/.
- The source is rather ambiguous in its using the term "laryngeal" for a presumed column of consonants that includes both a "voiced" and a "glottalized" plosive. A voiced glottal plosive cannot be made, because the glottis needs to be closed, and an ejective consonant requires an additional closure further up the vocal tract. Pending clarification, this row has been transcribed here as an epiglottal column and a glottal stop, both found in many other East Caucasian languages.

=== Vowels ===
	Front	Central	Back
Close	i		u
Mid	e	ə	
Open		a	

The Dargwa language features five vowel sounds /i, e, ə, a, u/. Vowels /i, u, a/ can be pharyngealized as /iˤ, uˤ, aˤ/. There is also a pharyngealized mid-back vowel [oˤ] as a realization of /uˤ/, occurring in the Mehweb variety.

== Orthography ==
The current Dargwa alphabet is based on Cyrillic as follows:

А а	Б б	В в	Г г	Гъ гъ	Гь гь	ГӀ гӀ	Д д	Е е	Ё ё	Ж ж	З з
И и	Й й	К к	Къ къ	Кь кь	КӀ кӀ	Л л	М м	Н н	О о	П п	ПӀ пӀ
Р р	С с	Т т	ТӀ тӀ	У у	Ф ф	Х х	Хъ хъ	Хь хь	ХӀ хӀ	Ц ц	ЦӀ цӀ
Ч ч	ЧӀ чӀ	Ш ш	Щ щ	Ъ ъ	Ы ы	Ь ь	Э э	Ю ю	Я я

The first Dargin alphabet was created by Peter von Uslar in the late 19th century, published in the grammar Хюркилинский язык for the Urakhi dialect of Dargwa.

The Latin alphabet of the 1920s is not entirely supported by Unicode, but is approximately:

a ʙ c ç ꞓ d e ə f g ǥ ƣ h ħ ⱨ i j k ⱪ l m n o p ᶈ q ꝗ r s ꞩ ş t ţ u v w x ҳ ӿ z ƶ ⱬ ƶ̧

(The letters transcribed here ⱨ ⱪ ᶈ ҳ ⱬ might have cedillas instead of hooks; the printing in sources is not clear.)

=== Writing system comparison chart ===
Compiled from:

Modern Cyrillic	Latin c. 1930	Uslar	Arabic (1920—1928)	Arabic (before 1920)	IPA
А а	A a	а	ا ,آ	آ	a
Б б	B b	б	ب		b
В в	V v	ԝ	و		w
Г г	G g	г	گ	ڮ	g
Гъ гъ	Ƣ ƣ	ӷ	غ		ʁ
Гь гь	H h	һ	ھ	ﻬ	h
ГӀ гӀ	Ⱨ ⱨ	ꜧ	ع		ʕ
Д д	D d	д	د		d
Е е	E e, je	e	اە	-	e, je
Ё ё	-				ɵ
Ж ж	Ƶ ƶ	ж	ژ	ج	ʒ
З з	Z z	з	ز		z
И и	I i	i	اى	-	i
Й й	J j	j	ى	ي	j
К к	K k	кᷱ	ک		k
Къ къ	Q q	к	ڠ	ق	q:
Кь кь	Ꝗ ꝗ	q	ق		qʼ
КӀ кӀ	Ⱪ ⱪ	қ	گ		kʼ
Л л	L l	л	ل		l
М м	M m	м	م		m
Н н	N n	н	ن		n
О о	O o	о	او	-	o
П п	P p	п	پ	ف	p
ПӀ пӀ (Note: Introduced in the 1960s)	(Note: Excluded in 1932)	ԥ	ڢ	ب	pʼ
Р р	R r	р	ر		r
С с	S s	с	س		s
Т т	T t	т	ت		t
ТӀ тӀ	T̨ t̨	ҭ	ط		t'
У у	U u	у	او	و	u
Ф ф	F f	-	ف		f
Х х	X x	х	خ		χ
Хъ хъ	Ӿ ӿ	k	څ	ق	q
Хь хь	Ҳ ҳ		ؼ		x:
ХӀ хӀ	Ħ ħ		ح		ħ
Ц ц	Ꞩ ꞩ	ц	ڝ	ژ	ʦ
ЦӀ цӀ	Ⱬ ⱬ	წ	ڗ	ژ	ʦ'
Ч ч	C c	ч	چ		tʃ
ЧӀ чӀ	Ç ç	ჭ	ج	چ	ʧ'
Ш ш	Ş ş	ш	ش		ʃ
Щ щ	şş	-			ʃː
Ъ ъ	-		ء	-	ʔ
Ы ы	-				ɨ
Ь ь	-				
Э э	E e	-	اه	-	e
Ю ю	ju	-			ju
Я я	Ә ә, ja	ӕ	أ	-	ja
-	Ⱬ̵ ⱬ̵	ђ	ڞ	-	t͡s
-	Ӡ ӡ	-			
-	є	-	ڃ	چ	
-	g̵	гᷱ	ݢ	-	

== Grammar ==
=== Verb ===
==== TAM ====
===== Assertive (finite) forms =====
Assertive (finite) forms
TAM CATEGORY	MEANING	ASPECT	MODIFIER	PREDICATIVE MARKER	NEGATION	EXAMPLE
DERIVED FROM THE PROGRESSIVE STEM ( BASIC STEM + -a)
Present	1. all types of present situations including actual and habitual situations, 2. historic present, 3. close future: the speaker's intention	IPF	[-ti]	PERSON / PRESENT (–da/–di/–ca=b)	reduplication or negative auxiliary	anwar-ri kaRar luk'-a–ca=b (Anwar is writing a letter)
Past Progressive	a progressive situation in the past	IPF	-ti	PAST (–di)	reduplication or negative auxiliary	it uč'-a-Ti–di (He was reading)
DERIVED FROM THE PRETERITE STEM ( BASIC STEM + -ib/-ub/-ur/-un):
Aorist	any completed action in the past	PF	-	PERSON (–da/–di)	negative auxiliary	
Imperfect	unspecified imperfective meaning in the past (both durative and multiplicative situations)	IPF	-	PERSON (–da/–di)	negative auxiliary	hin ha.ruq-ib
Perfect	perfect (a completed action whose results are still presently actual)	PF	-	PERSON /PRESENT (–da/–di/–ca=b)	negative auxiliary	jabu-l hin d=er{-ib–ca=d (The horse has drunk up the whole of the water)
Pluperfect	a completed action in the past preceding another past action	PF	-li	PAST (–di)	negative auxiliary	
*Evidential Present	1. inference from non-trivial results of a situation that still exist at the moment of speech 2. subject resultative:	IPF	-	PERSON/PRESENT (–da/–di/–ca=b)	negative auxiliary	jabu hinni b=u{-ib–ca=b (The horse has had a drink of water)
*Evidential Past	1. inference from non-trivial results that existed in the past subject resultative in the past	IPF	-li	PAST (–di)	negative auxiliary	
Resultative	resultative (state of the patient)	-	-li	PERSON /PRESENT (–da/–di/–ca=b)	negative auxiliary	jabu mura-l b=uK-un-ni–ca=b 'The horse has eaten its fill of hay.'
Experiential	experiential	-	-ci	PERSON /PRESENT (–da/–di/–ca=b)	negative auxiliary	ni}a-la }a=b b=uZ-ib-ti–ca=b d=eqel juz-i d=elk'-un-ti ̳There have been in our village those who had written many books'.
Habitual Past	a habitual action in the past	IPF	-a-d-i, -a-T-i, -iri/-ini or -aj	no separable predicative morphemes	reduplication	harzamina b=urs-iri di-la waba-l 'My mother used to tell (this story).'
DERIVED FROM THE OBLIGATIVE STEM ( BASIC STEM + -an):
Future	all types of future situations	IPF	-	PERSON/FUTURE(–da/–di/-ni)	negative auxiliary	
Obligative Present	a situation that the speaker believes necessary to be realized	IPF *	-	PERSON /PRESENT (–da/–di/–ca=b)	negative auxiliary	
Obligative Past	an irreal situation that the speaker believes necessary to have been realized in the past	IPF *	-	PAST (–di)	negative auxiliary	
DERIVED FROM THE HYPOTHETICAL STEM ( BASIC STEM + -iZ-):
Hypothetical Present	a possible action in the future	-	-	PERSON(–da/–di)	reduplication or negative auxiliary	
Hypothetical Past	a past situation that did not take place, but is treated by the speaker as having been possible under certain conditions	-	-	PAST (–di)	reduplication or negative auxiliary	
Irrealis	used in the apodosis of the irreal conditional clauses	IPF	-	PAST (–di)	reduplication	

== Bibliography ==
- Z. G. Abdullaev: Darginskij jazyk (3 Vol.). Moskau 1993. (in Russian)
- Z. G. Abdullaev: Darginskij jazyk. In: Jazyki narodov SSSR. Vol. 4. Moskau 1967. (in Russian)
- Karl Bouda: Die darginische Schriftsprache. (= Beiträge zur kaukasischen und sibirischen Sprachwissenschaft. Vol. 4). Leipzig 1937.
- Tb (2019). Daniel, Michael; Dobrushina, Nina; Ganenkov, Dmitry (eds.). The Mehweb language: Essays on phonology, morphology and syntax. Berlin: Language Science Press. doi:10.5281/zenodo.3374730. ISBN 978-3-96110-208-2.
- van den Berg, Helma (2001). Dargi folktales. Oral stories from the Caucasus. With an introduction to Dargi Grammar. Leiden: University of Leiden. ISBN 978-90-5789-066-6.
