= Amir Hamza III =

Utsmiy of Kaytag

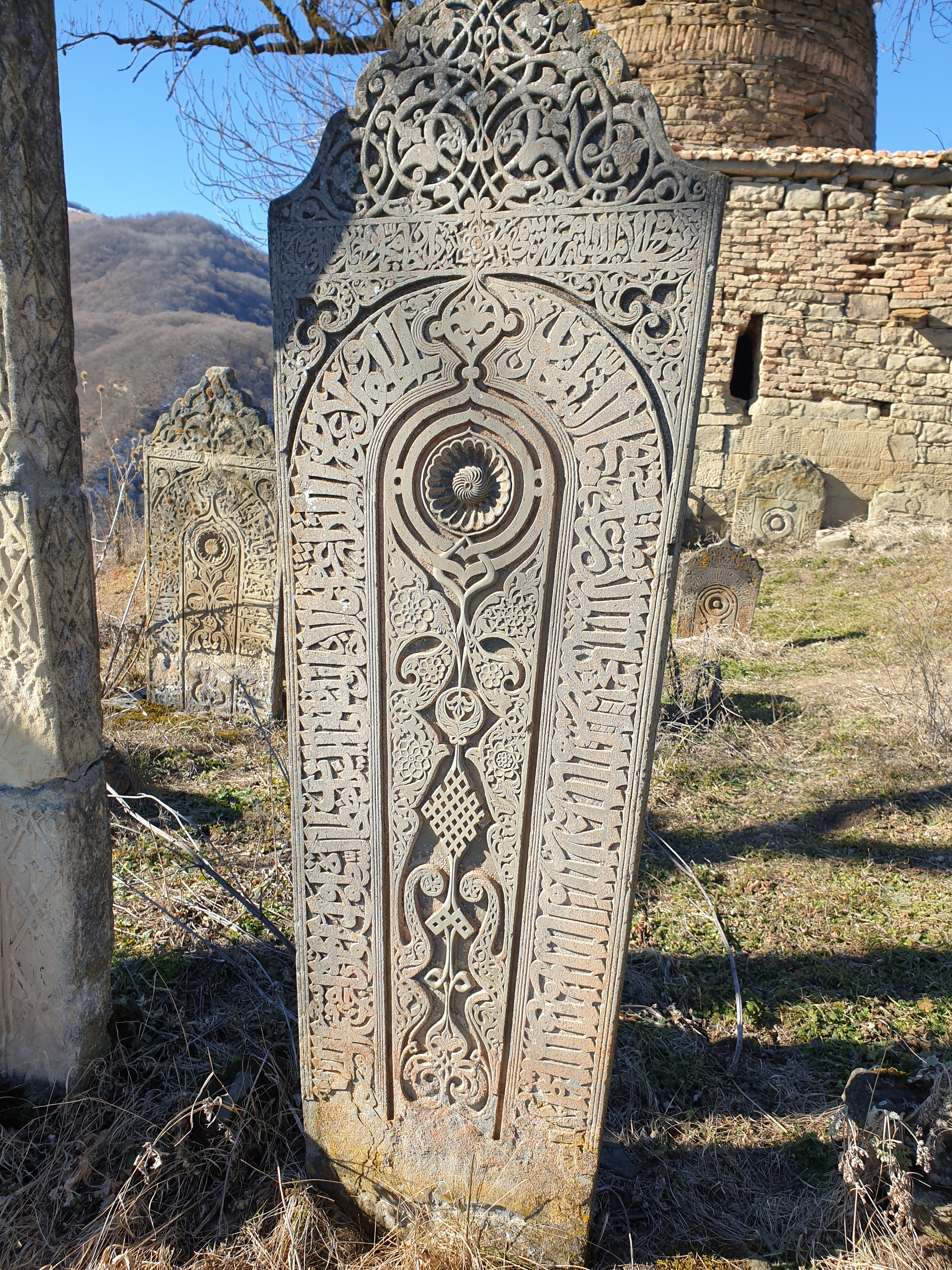

Utsmi of Kaitags
- Reign: 1751–1787
- Predecessor: Ahmad the Great
- Successor: Ustar Khan
- Died: 5 April [O.S. 25 March] 1787
- Buried: Kala Koreysh, Dakhadayevsky District
- Father: Khan Muhammad

Amir Hamza III (Dargwa: Амир-Хlямза Уцуми, Russian: Амир-Хамза) was an khan of Kaitags who ruled Kaitag Utsmiate from 1751 to 1787. He was known as a significant military figure in the history of Dagestan and Transcaucasia in the 18th century.

== Reign ==
The exact date of birth of Amir Hamza is unknown, but it is known that he was one of the three sons of Khan Muhammad, a military leader who predeceased his father Ahmad the Great. Amir Hamza had two brothers – Ustar and Sultan. As the grandson, he inherited Ulu Terekeme, Bashli, Berikey, Dzhemikent. Earliest mentions of Amir Hamza's reign dates back to 1751. He was related to other Caucasian rulers such as Umma Khan of Avars, Ghāzī Rustam of Tabasaran and Fatali Khan of Quba, who were his nephews and cousin respectively.

=== Struggle with Derbent ===
He became allied to Fatali Khan in 1760s, and joined his campaign against Derbent Khanate. Following a long siege, Amir Hamza with a small detachment was the first to enter Derbent on the orders of Fatali Khan. Following him, detachments of the Quba entered the city. All other troops were ordered to remain in their previous positions near the walls of Derbent. Having captured most of the city, the allies offered ruling Muhammad Hussain Khan to voluntarily surrender the upper fortress. The khan did not agree to this, but announced that he was open to negotiations. Amir Hamza didn't agree his offers to desert Fatali in return of joint rule of the khanate. Soon enough in 1765, Fatali Khan annexed all of Derbent Khanate to his own possessions with the help of Tarki Shamkhalate, Kaitag Utsmiate and Principality of Tabasaran. Subordinating Derbent, Fatali Khan gave a part of revenues of lands in Derbent Khanate to Shamkhal and Utsmi, while the ruler of Tabasaran was given a monetary compensation.

=== Struggle with Quba ===
Soon Fatali Khan married to Tuti Bike – his own cousin and sister of Amir Hamza in 1766. But in his turn, he refused to marry his younger half-sister Khadija Bike to Amir Hamza. Instead he married her to Malik Muhammad Khan – son of Baku's Khan Mirza Muhammad I effectively subordinating the Baku Khanate to himself. Already disgruntled over marriage refusal, Amir Hamza captured Derbent with 2,000 soldiers and held it for 3 days with the excuse of visiting his sister. Fatali Khan later drove Amir Hamza (despite a last-minute help from his brother Ustar) and his Kaitag tax collectors from Derbent and took away the revenues villages which he presented to Amir Hamza. Fatali, then appointed Eldar bek, disgruntled nephew of Muhammad Khan of Gazikumukh as steward of Derbent. These steps further alienated Dagestani lords from Fatali, who started to see him as a rival in the region. Fatali answered more harshly when Amir Hamza raided Derbent and Quba a year later, devastating his capital Bashli and forcing him to choose Chumli as his new capital. Meanwhile, he sought better relations with Ghāzī Rustam of Tabasaran, who was his nephew and possessed the strategic gorge of Dyubek that let bypass Derbent for raid campaigns.

Few years later, in 1774, Avar nutsal, persuaded by Aghasi Khan of Shirvan marched on Shamakhi and captured the city briefly. But, soon, Fatali Khan set out to Shirvan with the army and detachment led by Malik Mahammad Khan, khan of Baku in alliance with his traditional allies Akusha-Dargo Union and Maysum of Tabasaran. Nutsal was defeated near Old Shamakhi. Fatali khan promised him a safety and invited him for discussions to himself where Muhammad was murdered by Dargins of Akusha.

Treacherous murder of Avar Khan sent shockwaves among the rulers of Dagestan. New Avar leader Umma Khan tried to forge an anti-Quba alliance with other Dagestani and Caucasian feudal lords with marrying his sister Bakhtika to Ibrahim Khalil Khan of Karabakh. The Dagestani coalition of rulers was being led by Amir Hamza, his son-in-law Muhammad of Gazikumukh, his nephew Ghāzī Rustam of Tabasaran, Ali-Sultan of Dzengutai and Tishsiz Muhammad (Muhammad the Toothless) – head of Kazanishche Kumyks; they were also joined by the Kumyks of Endirey, Kostek and others.

Having gathered a 4,000-strong army, Amir Hamza marched into Quba but retreated north where he was ambushed by Fatali's armies. Nevertheless, coalition defeated Fatali's army of 8,000 in the battle of Gavdushan, near the city of Khudat in July 1774 and forced him to flee to Salyan. Muhammad the Toothless perished during the battle from Dagestani side, while Eldar-beg, Fatali's viceroy in Derbent and Maysum Shaykh-Ali of Tabasaran were killed from Quba side.

Using the opportunity, Amir Hamza attempted to capture Derbent by ruse, which was ruled by his sister Tuti Bike during the absence of her husband. Amir, accompanying body of perished Tishsiz Muhammad, approached the city and informed his sister that Fatali Khan died in a struggle and that he has brought his body. But Tuti, according to a legend defended the city walls and ordered to open fire to his army and then sent a detachment, which forced Amir Hamza to retreat to Mushkur. Soon Amir Hamza gathering an army, raided Baku Khanate and besieged Derbent. Meanwhile, Fatali khan sneaked his way to Derbent secretly and started gathering his adherents. Having sent secret letters to Russia, Fatali managed to secure some help. The official pretext for intervention in the conflict however was the death of a full member of the Russian Academy of Sciences Samuel Gottlieb Gmelin, who was detained by Amir Hamza in 1774. Having captured Gmelin, the utsmi hoped to receive a ransom of 30,000 rubles from the Russian government. While negotiations were underway with the Russian side, Gmelin died on July 27 from anxiety, unrest and malnutrition.

Along the way, Murtuzali, the Shamkhal of Tarki joined Russians, forcing Amir Hamza to raise the siege of Derbent after 9 months and battle Russians. But he was defeated badly near Iran-Kharab. As the result Fatali Khan recaptured Derbent and sent keys of city to Catherine II and asked to grant him the citizenship of Russia.

Russia's intervention split the block of Dagestan rulers, which was a great military and political help to Fatali Khan. Soon on 10 May 1775 Fatali Khan marched on Kaitag Utsmiate and Principality of Tabasaran with a Russian detachment led by major Cridner. Amir Hamza attacked them near Bashlykent, "but he was overthrown by an action of the artillery with great losses and took to flight". According to Mirza Hasan Alkadari, he also defeated Muhammad of Gazikumukh's armies and took neighboring Kura plain. Fatali Khan then moved to Tabasaran and defeated them near Khalag. However, later on Crinder and Fatali Khan were surrounded in a narrow ravine and suffering a significant detriment, forced to return to Derbent. Participants of anti-Quba coalition asked for peace and offered hostages but also demanded Fatali to vacate Derbent. But the Russian command didn't accept their conditions. On March 24 and then in April, 1776 sides convened a meeting in Darvag. A peace consensus was reached in the second meeting, according to which Kaitags and Tabasarans were under obligation to leave Derbent and Quba alone with their possessions and not to interfere in trade between Russia and Quba. Despite hat, Russian envoy in the meeting, major Fromgold reported that "there will never be a desired calmness here. Despite Utsmi [of Kaitags] and Qadi [of Tabasaran] agreed not to harm the [Fatali] Khan, it is a matter of time for them to only turn on him again".

To weaken Kaitags, Fatali Khan also granted Amir Hamza's nephew Muhammad beg 100 families from Quba and founded the eponymous village of Mamedkala for him.

=== Relations with Iran ===
Karim Khan Zand tasked his ally Gilaki Hedayat-Allah Khan in the summer of 1777 to achieve allegiance of Amir Hamza against Fatali Khan. Another embassy came in 1778 with gifts from the Gilan. Karim Khan asked Amir Hamza to help his cousin Zaki Khan in the campaign against Georgia, to enthrone Alexander Gruzinsky. But the campaign failed, as the rumor about the death of Kerim Khan was spread. Nevertheless, having raised up to 3,000 cavalry, Amir Hamza passed through Derbent, Quba, Shirvan and plundered Ardabil, and then with property and abundant provisions turned from there to Ganja. In the same way, having plundered outskirts of Ganja he returned to Kaitag through Shaki, Akhty, Kura and Tabasaran.

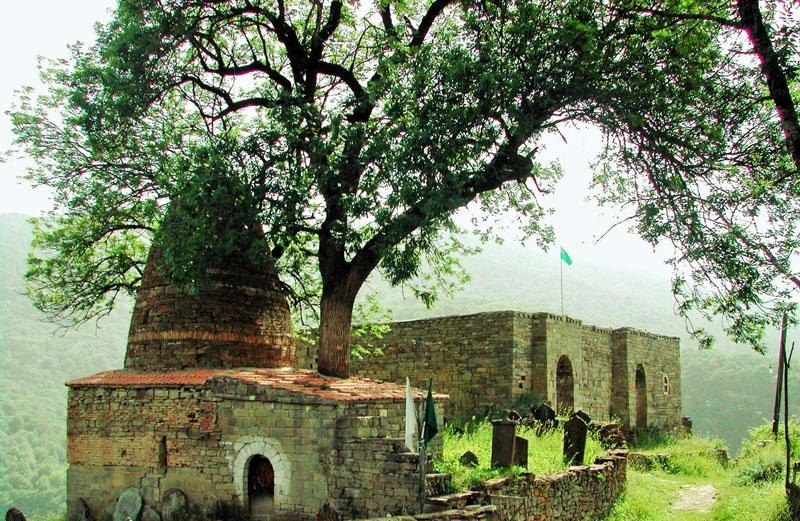
Mausoleum of Kala Koreysh, where Kaitag utsmies are buried

== Last years ==
In 1782 he hosted a delegation of United Brethren Church members in Kubachi.

He allied with Ibrahim Khalil Khan and Umma Khan in 1786/7 and besieged Fatali Khan in Aghsu for 9 months. Fatali was supported by Agha Muhammad Khan's brother Morteza Qoli with his loyal detachment. However, Fatali was forced to enter into negotiations with Umma Khan, betrothed him his daughter as his future wife, handed over the revenues of Salyan and 200,000 rubles of indemnity. However, he died on 25 March 5 April [O.S. 25 March] 1787 and was buried in Kala Koreysh, in the mausoleum of Utsmis. He was succeeded by his brother Ustar. He had 4 sons in 1774, two of them – Ali beg (d. 1796) and Razi beg (d. 1803) later became rulers themselves.

== Personality ==
According to Jacob Reineggs (1744–1793) he was "vindictive in his anger" and so skillfully knew "how to command the outward appearance of his face and that he is tormented internally by malice, revenge and hatred [...] He is immeasurably courteous, and when he volunteers to help dissenting parties with advice, patronage or power, then everyone will think that he wants to sacrifice all his strength for them, but he knows the surest means after receiving his benefits, which were the only cause of the quarrel.

== Sources ==
- Bournoutian, George (2021). From the Kur to the Aras: A Military History of Russia's Move into the South Caucasus and the First Russo-Iranian War, 1801–1813. Brill. ISBN 978-9004445154.
- Hajiev, Vladlen (1967). Danialov, Hajiali (ed.). История Дагестана [History of Dagestan] (PDF) (in Russian). Vol. 1. Moscow: Nauka.
- Hajiev, Vladlen (1965). Danialov, Hajiali (ed.). Роль России в истории Дагестана [Role of Russia in History of Dagestan] (PDF) (in Russian). Moscow: Nauka.
- Magomedov, Rasul (1999). Даргинцы в дагестанском историческом процессе [Dargins in the Dagestani historical process] (in Russian). Makhachkala: Dagestan book publishing house. ISBN 5-297-00577-9.
- Murtazayev, A.O. (2015). Кайтаг в VIII – первой половине XIX в. (Исследование политической истории и роли в системе политических структур Северо-Восточного Кавказа) [Kaitag in the 8th – the first half of the 19th century (Study of political history and role in the system of political structures of the North-Eastern Caucasus)] (PDF) (in Russian). Makhachkala.
- Ramazanov, Kh.; Shikhsaidov, Amri (1964). Очерки истории Южного Дагестана [Essays on the history of Southern Dagestan] (in Russian). Dagestan branch of the USSR Academy of Sciences.
- Huseynov, Isa (1958). История Азербайджана [History of Azerbaijan] (in Russian). Publishing House of the Academy of Sciences of the Azerbaijan SSR.
