= Kaitags =

Kaitag: хайдакьан

Total population
- 25,000–30,000

Regions with significant populations
- Russia: 25,000

Languages
- Kaitag language, Dargwa language

Religion
- Sunni Islam

Related ethnic groups
- Dargins

Kaitags (Kaitag: хайдакьан, Kumyk: хайдакълар, Tabassaran: хайдакьланти, Lezgian: къайтагъар) are an ethnic group of the Dargins, but sometimes considered as a separate people. Their number are estimated to be over 25,000. They live mainly on the territory of the Kaytagsky district of Dagestan, partly on the plain and in cities (Makhachkala, Derbent, Izberbash, etc.). Part of the Kaitag people were resettled in Chechnya in 1944, from where they later moved to the north of Dagestan. They speak the Kaitag language of the Dargin branch of the Northeast Caucasian family, but the Dargin literary language and Russian are also common. They are mostly Sunni Muslims.

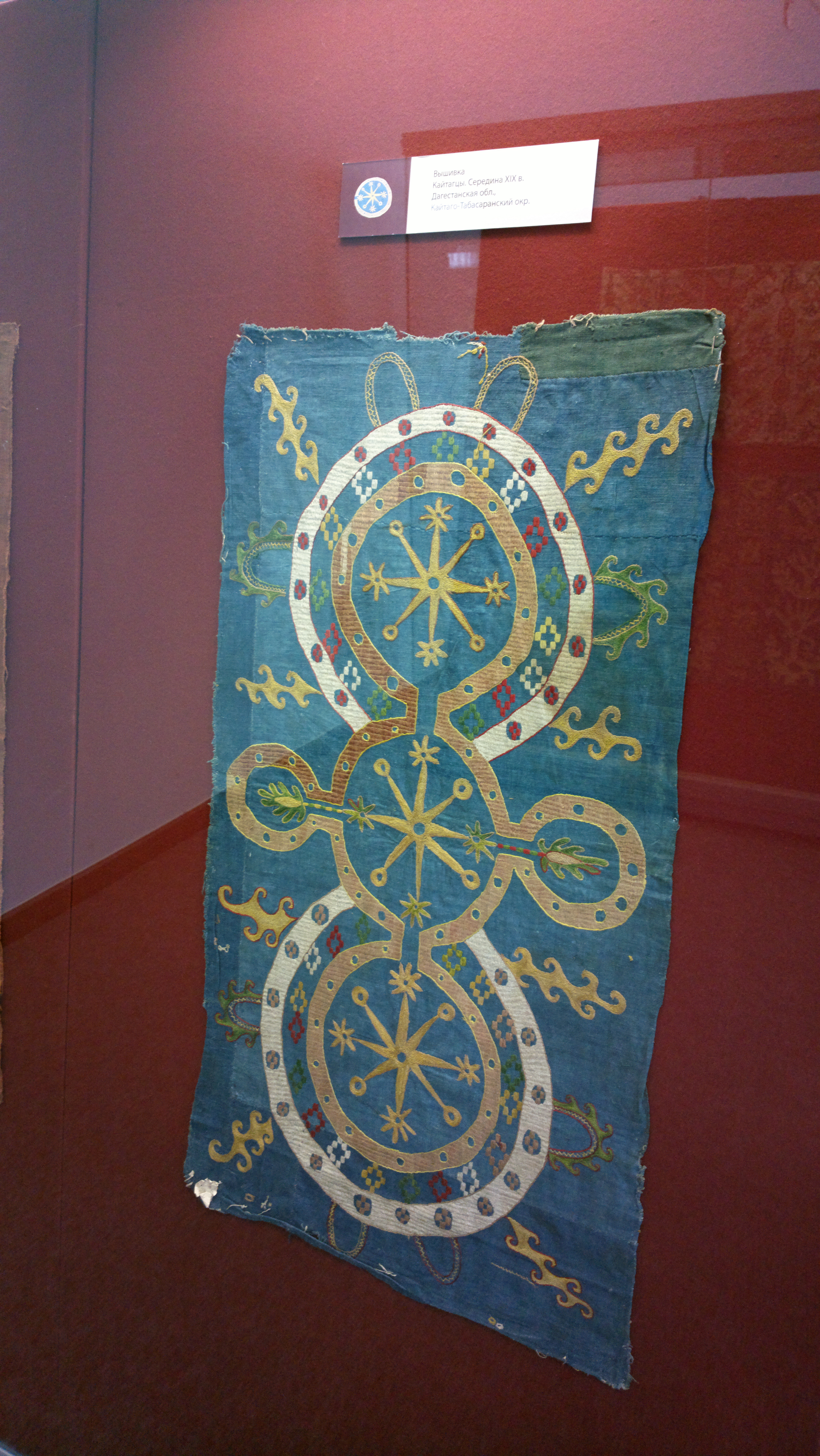
Traditional Kaitag embroidery

== Ethnogenesis ==
The Kaitag people themselves did not preserve ancient legends about the origin of themselves. In pre-revolutionary and Soviet literature, there were theories about the Mongolian and Oghuz roots of the Kaitag people, held in particular by orientalist Vasily Bartold. In Soviet times, the Mongolic theory appeared in some works of linguists: For example, Nikolai Dmitriev believed that the modern Kaitag people had lost their Mongolic language save for very few vocabulary elements. Meanwhile orientalist Vladimir Minorsky referred to this theory as "pure delusion". According to him, the name Kaitag is attested with various spelling errors by Arabic authors as early as the 9–10th centuries.

The history of the Kaitag people is traditionally covered within the framework of their family ties with other Dagestani peoples, in particular with the Dargins. Recent genetic studies also revealed ties with the Dagestan peoples, showing that the most common haplogroup among the Kaitag people is J1, which also predominates among the Dargins (70–80%, up to 91%).

Kaitag people founded the Kaitag Utsmiate, which was one of the princely possessions in Dagestan with a ruler known as an utsmi. The military and political power of the utsmi was made up of the Upper Kaitag and Dargin free societies of Utsmi-Dargo, Akusha-Dargo, Kaba-Dargo, Burkun Dargo, Muira, Gapsh, Syurga. Utsmi usually sent a newborn son to them for fosterage to cement a political alliance. The capital of the Utsmiate was Kala Koreysh – later, Urkarakh, Majalis and Bashly also grew in importance.

Since the 1860s, the Kaitag people have been included in the Kaitago-Tabasaran district of the Dagestan region. According to the 1926 census, the Kaitag people numbered 14,400. Beginning with the 1939 Soviet census, they were included within the count of ethnic Dargins.

== Sources ==
- Sergeyeva G.A. (2008). Kaitags // Great Russian Encyclopedia, Volume 12. Moscow: Scientific publishing house "Great Russian Encyclopedia". pp. 468–469.
