= Kaitak =

Kaitak, Kajtak, or Kaitag may refer to the following topics associated with a region in Dagestan, Russia:

- Kaitag State, a historic principality
- Kaytagsky District, the current administrative unit
- Kaitags, an ethnic group
- Kaitak language, of the Northeast Caucasian family
- Kaitag dialect, of the Turkic Kumyk language
- Kaitag dialect, of the Indo-European Judeo-Tat language
- Kaitag textiles, a form of embroidery

== See also ==
- Kai Tak (disambiguation), several places in Hong Kong, including its former airport
