= Ulluchay =

Ulluchay Ullu-Chay
- Ulluchay River

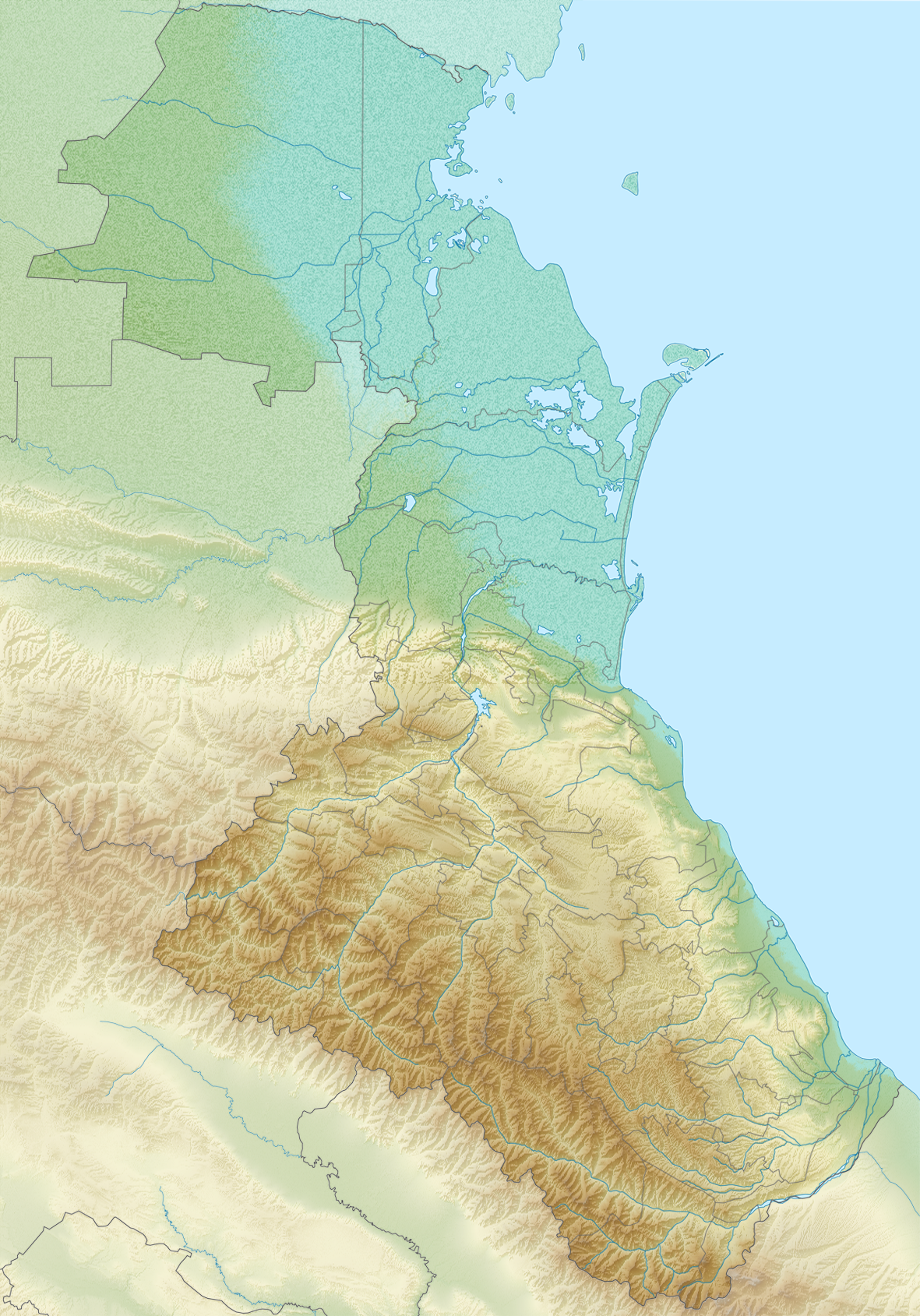
- Location within Caucasus Mountains Location within Republic of Dagestan
- Etymology: Kumyk for "big river"
- Native name: Уллучай (Russian)

Location
- Country: Russia
- Federal subject: Dagestan
- Region: Caucasus
- Districts: Dakhadayevsky, Kaytagsky, and Derbentsky
- Nearby village: Segeler

Physical characteristics
- Source: Springs near the northwestern end of the Kokmadag Range
  - location: Dagestan, Russia
  - coordinates: 41°59′53″N 47°20′05″E
- Mouth: Caspian Sea
  - location: Near Segeler, Dagestan, Russia
  - coordinates: 42°56′13″N 48°07′57″E
- Length: 111 km (69 mi)
- Basin size: 1,440 km^{2} (560 sq mi)
- Discharge
  - average: 4.83 m^{3}/s (171 cu ft/s)
  - maximum: 366 m^{3}/s (12,900 cu ft/s)

Basin features
- Tributaries
  - right: Kunki, Anklyuglyuchay, Jivus, Nakhalu, Shurkhla

Ulluchay (Dargwa: ХулахӀеркӀ, Уллучай хӀеркӀ; Kumyk: Уллу Чай) is a river that flows through the Dakhadayevsky, Kaytagsky, and Derbentsky districts of Dagestan.

== Etymology ==
Ulluchay translates from the Kumyk language as “big river”: “ullu” means “big,” while “chay” means “river.”

== Geography ==
The river is 111 km long, and its drainage basin covers an area of 1,440 km^{2}.

The river originates from springs near the northwestern end of the Kokmadag Range and flows into the Caspian Sea near the village of Segeler.

== Hydrology ==
The river is characterized by a flood regime during the warm season and low-water conditions in winter. The highest annual water discharge rates usually occur during periods of rainfall. Summer rain-induced floods sometimes reach catastrophic proportions. Mudflows have also been recorded along the river channel. The average annual discharge is 4.83 m^{3}/s, while the maximum discharge is 366 m^{3}/s.

== Tributaries ==
The main tributaries are the Kunki, Anklyuglyuchay, Jivus, Nakhalu, Shurkhla, and others.

== Study of the river and its significance for water management ==
The river has been studied at stream gauging stations in Madzhalis and Berikey. Its waters are extensively used for irrigation, as a result of which the lower reaches of the river frequently experience a complete absence of flow.
