= Guldy =

Guldy Гульды Гъулди
- Selo
- Location within Republic of Dagestan Location within Russia
- Coordinates: 42°04′17″N 47°41′20″E
- Country: Russia
- Region: Republic of Dagestan
- District: Kaytagsky District
- Time zone: UTC+3:00

Guldy (Russian: Гульды; Kaitag and Dargwa: Гъулди) is a rural locality (a selo) in Dzhirabachinsky Selsoviet, Kaytagsky District, Republic of Dagestan, Russia. The population was 145 as of 2010.

== Geography ==
Guldy is located 23 km southwest of Madzhalis (the district's administrative centre) by road. Surgiya and Dzurmachi are the nearest rural localities.

== Nationalities ==
Dargins live there.
