= Berikey =

Berikey Бәрәкеј Берикей
- Selo
- Location within Republic of Dagestan Location within Russia
- Coordinates: 42°13′N 48°04′E
- Country: Russia
- Region: Republic of Dagestan
- District: Derbentsky District
- Time zone: UTC+3:00

Berikey (Russian: Берикей; Azerbaijani: Бәрәкеј, Bərəkəy; Dargwa: Берикей) is a rural locality (a selo) and the administrative centre of Berikeyevsky Selsoviet, Derbentsky District, Republic of Dagestan, Russia. The population was 3,028 as of 2010. The village has an Azerbaijani-majority. There are 26 streets.

== Geography ==
Berikey is located 28 km southwest of Derbent (the district's administrative centre) by road, on the Ulluchay river. Dzhemikent and Ullu-Terkeme are the nearest rural localities.

== History ==
In 1926, 13 Mountain Jewish families, comprising 35 people, lived in the village, accounting for 3.8% of the total population. In the 1990s, Dargins from the Sergokalinsky, Kaytagsky, and Dakhadayevsky districts resettled in the village.

== Population ==
According to the 2021 Russian census:

| Nationality | Number of people | Share |
|---|---|---|
| Azerbaijanis | 2,914 | 90.98 % |
| Dargins | 272 | 8.49% |
| other | 17 | 0.53 % |
| total | 3,203 | 100 % |

== Mineral resources ==
In 1894, the first commercial oil well in Dagestan was drilled near the village of Berikey. Deposits of carbon dioxide-rich, iodine-bromine, and boron mineral waters are also located in the vicinity of the village.
