= Adaga =

Adaga Адага Адагъа Адагъай
- Selo
- Location within Republic of Dagestan Location within Russia
- Coordinates: 42°00′N 47°42′E
- Country: Russia
- Region: Republic of Dagestan
- District: Kaytagsky District
- Time zone: UTC+3:00

Adaga (Russian: Адага; Kaitag: Адагъа; Dargwa: Адагъай) is a rural locality (a selo) in Shilyaginsky Selsoviet, Kaytagsky District, Republic of Dagestan, Russia. In 2010, the population was 163. There are 6 streets.

== Geography ==
Adaga is located 20 km southwest of Madzhalis (the district's administrative centre) by road. Kulidzha and Shilyagi are the nearest rural localities.

== Nationalities ==
Many Dargins live in Adaga.
