= Surkhachi =

Surkhachi Сурхачи Цӏурхачи
- Selo
- Location within Republic of Dagestan Location within Russia
- Coordinates: 42°09′N 47°44′E
- Country: Russia
- Region: Republic of Dagestan
- District: Kaytagsky District
- Time zone: UTC+3:00

Surkhachi (Russian: Сурхачи; Kaitag and Dargwa: Цӏурхачи) is a rural locality (a selo) in Akhmedkentsky Selsoviet, Kaytagsky District, Republic of Dagestan, Russia. The population was 455 as of 2010. There are 13 streets.

== Geography ==
Surkhachi is located 14 km northwest of Madzhalis (the district's administrative centre) by road. Iraki and Zilbachi are the nearest rural localities.

== Geography ==
Akhmedkent is the nearest rural locality.

== Nationalities ==
Dargins live there.
