= Kirtsik =

Kirtsik Кирцик Гъирцӏиччи
- Selo
- Location within Republic of Dagestan Location within Russia
- Coordinates: 42°00′N 47°50′E
- Country: Russia
- Region: Republic of Dagestan
- District: Kaytagsky District
- Time zone: UTC+3:00

Kirtsik (Russian: Кирцик; Kaitag: Гъирцӏиччи) is a rural locality (a selo) and the administrative centre of Kirtsiksky Selsoviet, Kaytagsky District, Republic of Dagestan, Russia. The population was 96 as of 2010.

== Geography ==
Kirtsik is located 26 km south of Madzhalis (the district's administrative centre) by road. Varsit and Shuragat are the nearest rural localities.

== Nationalities ==
Dargins live there.
