= Chakhdikna =

Chakhdikna Чахдикна Чӏаӏхӏдикӏна ЧяхӀдикӀна
- Selo
- Location within Republic of Dagestan Location within Russia
- Coordinates: 42°08′N 47°45′E
- Country: Russia
- Region: Republic of Dagestan
- District: Kaytagsky District
- Time zone: UTC+3:00

Chakhdikna (Russian: Чахдикна; Kaitag: Чӏаӏхӏдикӏна; Dargwa: ЧяхӀдикӀна) is a rural locality (a selo) in Akhmedkentsky Selsoviet, Kaytagsky District, Republic of Dagestan, Russia. The population was 217 as of 2010. There are 3 streets.

== Geography ==
Chakhdikna is located 11 km northwest of Madzhalis (the district's administrative centre) by road. Surkhachi and Kudagu are the nearest rural localities.

== Nationalities ==
Dargins live there.
