= Dzhirabachi =

Dzhirabachi Джирабачи Жирбачӏи ЖирабачӀи
- Selo
- Location within Republic of Dagestan Location within Russia
- Coordinates: 42°05′N 47°44′E
- Country: Russia
- Region: Republic of Dagestan
- District: Kaytagsky District
- Time zone: UTC+3:00

Dzhirabachi (Russian: Джирабачи; Kaitag: Жирбачӏи; Dargwa: ЖирабачӀи) is a rural locality (a selo) and the administrative centre of Dzhirabachinsky Selsoviet, Kaytagsky District, Republic of Dagestan, Russia. The population was 529 as of 2010. There are 6 streets.

== Geography ==
Dzhirabachi is located 16 km southwest of Madzhalis (the district's administrative centre) by road. Daknisa and Surgiya are the nearest rural localities.

== Nationalities ==
Dargins live there.
