= Barshamay =

Barshamay Баршамай Баршшамагӏи Баршамагӏи
- Selo
- Location within Republic of Dagestan Location within Russia
- Coordinates: 42°06′N 47°51′E
- Country: Russia
- Region: Republic of Dagestan
- District: Kaytagsky District
- Time zone: UTC+3:00

Barshamay (Russian: Баршамай; Kaitag: Баршшамагӏи; Dargwa: Баршамагӏи) is a rural locality (a selo) and the administrative centre of Barshamaysky Selsoviet, Kaytagsky District, Republic of Dagestan, Russia. The population was 2,110 as of 2010. There are 24 streets.

== Geography ==
Barshamay is located 6 km southeast of Madzhalis (the district's administrative centre) by road. Madzhalis and Kartalay are the nearest rural localities.

l
