= Lishcha =

Lishcha Лища Леххьа
- Selo
- Location within Republic of Dagestan Location within Russia
- Coordinates: 42°04′N 47°44′E
- Country: Russia
- Region: Republic of Dagestan
- District: Kaytagsky District
- Time zone: UTC+3:00

Lishcha (Russian: Лища; Kaitag: Леххьа) is a rural locality (a selo) in Dzhirabachinsky Selsoviet, Kaytagsky District, Republic of Dagestan, Russia. The population was 110 as of 2010. There are 2 streets.

== Geography ==
Lishcha is located 17 km southwest of Madzhalis (the district's administrative centre) by road. Surgiya and Daknisa are the nearest rural localities.

== Nationalities ==
Dargins live there.
