= Mallakent =

Mallakent Маллакент Маллаккент
- Selo
- Location within Republic of Dagestan Location within Russia
- Coordinates: 42°10′N 47°47′E
- Country: Russia
- Region: Republic of Dagestan
- District: Kaytagsky District
- Time zone: UTC+3:00

Mallakent (Russian: Маллакент; Kaitag: Маллаккент) is a rural locality (a selo) in Yangikentsky Selsoviet, Kaytagsky District, Republic of Dagestan, Russia. The population was 264 as of 2010. There are 3 streets.

== Geography ==
Mallakent is located 13 km northwest of Madzhalis (the district's administrative centre) by road. Chumli and Yangikent are the nearest rural localities.

== Nationalities ==
Lezgins live there.
