= Gaziya =

Gaziya Газия Гъазийа
- Selo
- Location within Republic of Dagestan Location within Russia
- Coordinates: 42°05′N 47°49′E
- Country: Russia
- Region: Republic of Dagestan
- District: Kaytagsky District
- Time zone: UTC+3:00

Gaziya (Russian: Газия; Kaitag: Гъазийа) is a rural locality (a selo) in Barshamaysky Selsoviet, Kaytagsky District, Republic of Dagestan, Russia. The population was 388 as of 2010. There are 2 streets.

== Geography ==
Gaziya is located 6 km southwest of Madzhalis (the district's administrative centre) by road. Khungiya and Mizhigli are the nearest rural localities.

== Nationalities ==
Dargins live there.
