= Kulegu =

Kulegu Кулегу Кьулегу
- Selo
- Location within Republic of Dagestan Location within Russia
- Coordinates: 42°04′N 47°52′E
- Country: Russia
- Region: Republic of Dagestan
- District: Kaytagsky District
- Time zone: UTC+3:00

Kulegu (Russian: Кулегу; Kaitag and Dargwa: Кьулегу) is a rural locality (a selo) in Dzhibakhninsky Selsoviet, Kaytagsky District, Republic of Dagestan, Russia. The population was 151 as of 2010. There are 4 streets.

== Geography ==
Kulegu is located 14 km southeast of Madzhalis (the district's administrative centre) by road. Khatagi and Dzhinabi are the nearest rural localities.

== Nationalities ==
Dargins live there.
