= Dzhinabi =

Dzhinabi Джинаби Ччинаби Жинаби
- Selo
- Location within Republic of Dagestan Location within Russia
- Coordinates: 42°04′N 47°51′E
- Country: Russia
- Region: Republic of Dagestan
- District: Kaytagsky District
- Time zone: UTC+3:00

Dzhinabi (Russian: Джинаби; Kaitag: Ччинаби; Dargwa: Жинаби) is a rural locality (a selo) in Kaytagsky District, Republic of Dagestan, Russia. The population was 710 as of 2010. There are 26 streets.

== Geography ==
Dzhinabi is located 11 km southeast of Madzhalis (the district's administrative centre) by road. Kartalay and Karatsan are the nearest rural localities.

== Nationalities ==
Dargins live there.
