= Turaga, Republic of Dagestan =

Turaga Турага Турагъа
- Selo
- Location within Republic of Dagestan Location within Russia
- Coordinates: 41°57′N 47°48′E
- Country: Russia
- Region: Republic of Dagestan
- District: Kaytagsky District
- Time zone: UTC+3:00

Turaga (Russian: Турага; Kaitag and Dargwa: Турагъа) is a rural locality (a selo) in Kirkinsky Selsoviet, Kaytagsky District, Republic of Dagestan, Russia. The population was 57 as of 2010.

== Geography ==
Turaga is located 31 km southwest of Madzhalis (the district's administrative centre) by road. Kirki and Kuzhnik are the nearest rural localities.

== Nationalities ==
Dargins live there.
