= Duregi =

Duregi Дуреги Ттурей
- Selo
- Location within Republic of Dagestan Location within Russia
- Coordinates: 42°02′N 47°45′E
- Country: Russia
- Region: Republic of Dagestan
- District: Kaytagsky District
- Time zone: UTC+3:00

Duregi (Russian: Дуреги; Kaitag: Ттурей) is a rural locality (a selo) in Shilyaginsky Selsoviet, Kaytagsky District, Republic of Dagestan, Russia. The population was 270 as of 2010. There are 13 streets.

== Geography ==
Duregi is located 15 km southwest of Madzhalis (the district's administrative centre) by road. Shilyagi and Kulidzha are the nearest rural localities.

== Nationalities ==
Dargins live there.
