= Shuragat =

Shuragat Шурагат Шурагъа Шурагъат
- Selo
- Location within Republic of Dagestan Location within Russia
- Coordinates: 41°59′N 47°50′E
- Country: Russia
- Region: Republic of Dagestan
- District: Kaytagsky District
- Time zone: UTC+3:00

Shuragat (Russian: Шурагат; Kaitag: Шурагъа; Dargwa: Шурагъат) is a rural locality (a selo) in Kirtsiksky Selsoviet, Kaytagsky District, Republic of Dagestan, Russia. The population was 71 as of 2010.

== Geography ==
Shuragat is located 26 km south of Madzhalis (the district's administrative centre) by road. Varsit and Kirtsik are the nearest rural localities.

== Nationalities ==
Dargins live there.
