= Daknisa =

Daknisa Дакниса Даӏхънисса Дяхъниса
- Selo
- Location within Republic of Dagestan Location within Russia
- Coordinates: 42°05′N 47°43′E
- Country: Russia
- Region: Republic of Dagestan
- District: Kaytagsky District
- Time zone: UTC+3:00

Daknisa (Russian: Дакниса; Kaitag: Даӏхънисса; Dargwa: Дяхъниса) is a rural locality (a selo) in Dzhirabachinsky Selsoviet, Kaytagsky District, Republic of Dagestan, Russia. The population was 437 as of 2010. There are 3 streets.

== Geography ==
Daknisa is located 14 km southwest of Madzhalis (the district's administrative centre) by road. Dzhirabachi and Surgiya are the nearest rural locality.

== Nationalities ==
Dargins live there.
