= Shilansha =

Shilansha Шиланша Шшиланшша
- Selo
- Location within Republic of Dagestan Location within Russia
- Coordinates: 41°58′N 47°47′E
- Country: Russia
- Region: Republic of Dagestan
- District: Kaytagsky District
- Time zone: UTC+3:00

Shilansha (Russian: Шиланша; Kaitag: Шшиланшша) is a rural locality (a selo) in Kirkinsky Selsoviet, Kaytagsky District, Republic of Dagestan, Russia. The population was 82 as of 2010.

== Geography ==
Shilansha is located 33 km southwest of Madzhalis (the district's administrative centre) by road. Kirki and Turaga are the nearest rural localities.

== Nationalities ==
Dargins live there.
