= Novaya Barsha =

Novaya Barsha Новая Барша Йенги Баршша Сагаси Барша
- Selo
- Location within Republic of Dagestan Location within Russia
- Coordinates: 42°11′N 47°50′E
- Country: Russia
- Region: Republic of Dagestan
- District: Kaytagsky District
- Time zone: UTC+3:00

Novaya Barsha (Russian: Новая Барша; Kaitag: Йенги Баршша; Dargwa: Сагаси Барша) is a rural locality (a selo) in Yangikentsky Selsoviet, Kaytagsky District, Republic of Dagestan, Russia. The population was 153 as of 2010. There are 2 streets.

== Geography ==
Novaya Barsha is located 9 km north of Madzhalis (the district's administrative centre) by road. Yangikent and Chumli are the nearest rural localities.

== Nationalities ==
Dargins live there.
