= Surgiya =

Surgiya Сургия Сургьей
- Selo
- Location within Republic of Dagestan Location within Russia
- Coordinates: 42°04′N 47°43′E
- Country: Russia
- Region: Republic of Dagestan
- District: Kaytagsky District
- Time zone: UTC+3:00

Surgiya (Russian: Сургия; Kaitag: Сургьей) is a rural locality (a selo) in Dzhirabachinsky Selsoviet, Kaytagsky District, Republic of Dagestan, Russia. The population was 182 as of 2010. There are 2 streets.

== Geography ==
Karatsan is located 17 km southwest of Madzhalis (the district's administrative centre) by road. Dzhirabachi and Daknisa are the nearest rural localities.

== Nationalities ==
Dargins live there.
