= Dzhibakhni =

Dzhibakhni Джибахни Чӏибахӏне ЧIибяхIни
- Selo
- Location within Republic of Dagestan Location within Russia
- Coordinates: 42°03′N 47°54′E
- Country: Russia
- Region: Republic of Dagestan
- District: Kaytagsky District
- Time zone: UTC+3:00

Dzhibakhni (Russian: Джибахни; Kaitag: Чӏибахӏне; Dargwa: ЧIибяхIни) is a rural locality (a selo) and the administrative centre of Dzhibakhninsky Selsoviet, Kaytagsky District, Republic of Dagestan, Russia. The population was 1,198 as of 2010. There are 20 streets.

== Geography ==
Dzhibakhni is located 19 km southeast of Madzhalis (the district's administrative centre) by road. Ruka and Dzhavgat are the nearest rural localities.

== Nationalities ==
Dargins live there.
