= Bazhluk =

Bazhluk Бажлук Баӏжулей Бяжлуки
- Selo
- Location within Republic of Dagestan Location within Russia
- Coordinates: 42°02′N 47°48′E
- Country: Russia
- Region: Republic of Dagestan
- District: Kaytagsky District
- Time zone: UTC+3:00

Bazhluk (Russian: Бажлук; Kaitag: Баӏжулей; Dargwa: Бяжлуки) is a rural locality (a selo) in Varsitsky Selsoviet, Kaytagsky District, Republic of Dagestan, Russia. The population was 39 as of 2010.

== Geography ==
Bazhluk is located 28 km southwest of Madzhalis (the district's administrative centre) by road. Varsit, Shilyagi and Duregi are the nearest rural localities.
