= Karatsan =

Karatsan Карацан Гъаӏрацӏан ГъярацӀан
- Selo
- Location within Republic of Dagestan Location within Russia
- Coordinates: 42°05′N 47°52′E
- Country: Russia
- Region: Republic of Dagestan
- District: Kaytagsky District
- Time zone: UTC+3:00

Karatsan (Russian: Карацан; Kaitag: Гъаӏрацӏан; Dargwa: ГъярацӀан) is a rural locality (a selo) and the administrative centre of Karatsansky Selsoviet, Kaytagsky District, Republic of Dagestan, Russia. The population was 1,162 as of 2010. There are 13 streets.

== Geography ==
Karatsan is located 10 km southeast of Madzhalis (the district's administrative centre) by road. Kartalay and Dzhinabi are the nearest rural localities.

== Nationalities ==
Dargins live there.
