= Shilyagi =

Shilyagi Шиляги Шилагьи
- Selo
- Location within Republic of Dagestan Location within Russia
- Coordinates: 42°02′N 47°47′E
- Country: Russia
- Region: Republic of Dagestan
- District: Kaytagsky District
- Time zone: UTC+3:00

Shilyagi (Russian: Шиляги; Kaitag and Dargwa: Шилагьи) is a rural locality (a selo) and the administrative centre of Shilyaginsky Selsoviet, Kaytagsky District, Republic of Dagestan, Russia. The population was 484 as of 2010. There are 19 streets.

== Nationalities ==
Dargins live there.

== Geography ==
Shilyagi is located 9 km southwest of Madzhalis (the district's administrative centre) by road. Kulidzha and Khungiya are the nearest rural localities.
