= Dzhavgat =

Dzhavgat Джавгат Жавгъат
- Selo
- Location within Republic of Dagestan Location within Russia
- Coordinates: 42°03′N 47°56′E
- Country: Russia
- Region: Republic of Dagestan
- District: Kaytagsky District
- Time zone: UTC+3:00

Dzhavgat (Russian: Джавгат; Kaitag and Dargwa: Жавгъат) is a rural locality (a selo) and the administrative centre of Dzhavgatsky Selsoviet, Kaytagsky District, Republic of Dagestan, Russia. The population was 2,189 as of 2010. There are 7 streets.

== Geography ==
Dzhavgat is located 23 km southeast of Madzhalis (the district's administrative centre) by road. Ruka and Dzhibakhni are the nearest rural localities.

== Nationalities ==
Dargins live there.
