= Khungiya =

Khungiya Хунгия Хъвангей
- Selo
- Location within Republic of Dagestan Location within Russia
- Coordinates: 42°05′N 47°48′E
- Country: Russia
- Region: Republic of Dagestan
- District: Kaytagsky District
- Time zone: UTC+3:00

Khungiya (Russian: Хунгия; Kaitag: Хъвангей) is a rural locality (a selo) in Madzhalissky Selsoviet, Kaytagsky District, Republic of Dagestan, Russia. The population was 362 as of 2010. There are 4 streets.

== Geography ==
Khungiya is located 4 km southwest of Madzhalis (the district's administrative centre) by road. Gaziya and Mizhigli are the nearest rural localities.

== Nationalities ==
Khungiya has a Dargin population.
