= Dzhigiya =

Dzhigiya Джигия Жигай
- Selo
- Location within Republic of Dagestan Location within Russia
- Coordinates: 42°03′N 47°47′E
- Country: Russia
- Region: Republic of Dagestan
- District: Kaytagsky District
- Time zone: UTC+3:00

Dzhigiya (Russian: Джигия; Kaitag and Dargwa: Жигай) is a rural locality (a selo) in Shilyaginsky Selsoviet, Kaytagsky District, Republic of Dagestan, Russia. The population was 286 as of 2010. There are 13 streets.

== Geography ==
Dzhigiya is located 8 km southwest of Madzhalis (the district's administrative centre) by road. Shilyagi and Kulidzha are the nearest rural localities.

== Nationalities ==
Dargins live there.
