= Butulta =

Butulta Бутулта Бутулттамахьи
- Selo
- Location within Republic of Dagestan Location within Russia
- Coordinates: 42°04′N 47°26′E
- Country: Russia
- Region: Republic of Dagestan
- District: Dakhadayevsky District
- Time zone: UTC+3:00

Butulta (Russian: Бутулта; Dargwa: Бутулттамахьи) is a rural locality (a selo) in Urarinsky Selsoviet, Dakhadayevsky District, Republic of Dagestan, Russia. The population was 43 in 2010. there is one street.

== Geography ==
Butulta is located 41 kilometres (25 mi) southwest of Urkarakh (the district's administrative centre) by road. Ayatsuri and Mukranari are the nearest rural localities.

== Nationalities ==
Dargins live there.
