= Pilyaki =

Pilyaki Пиляки Пилахъи Пиляхъи
- Selo
- Location within Republic of Dagestan Location within Russia
- Coordinates: 42°00′N 47°51′E
- Country: Russia
- Region: Republic of Dagestan
- District: Kaytagsky District
- Time zone: UTC+3:00

Pilyaki (Russian: Пиляки; Kaitag: Пилахъи; Dargwa: Пиляхъи) is a rural locality (a selo) in Kirtsiksky Selsoviet, Kaytagsky District, Republic of Dagestan, Russia. The population was 29 as of 2010.

== Geography ==
Pilyaki is located 30 km south of Madzhalis (the district's administrative centre) by road. Kirtsik and Varsit are the nearest rural localities.

== Nationalities ==
Dargins live there.
