= Kartalay =

Kartalay Карталай Кьваӏрталай Кьярталай
- Selo
- Location within Republic of Dagestan Location within Russia
- Coordinates: 42°05′N 47°51′E
- Country: Russia
- Region: Republic of Dagestan
- District: Kaytagsky District
- Time zone: UTC+3:00

Kartalay (Russian: Карталай; Kaitag: Кьваӏрталай; Dargwa: Кьярталай) is a rural locality (a selo) in Karatsansky Selsoviet, Kaytagsky District, Republic of Dagestan, Russia. The population was 601 as of 2010. There are 6 streets.

== Geography ==
Kartalay is located 9 km southeast of Madzhalis (the district's administrative centre) by road. Karatsan and Dzhinabi are the nearest rural localities.

== Nationalities ==
Dargins live there.
