= Khadagi =

Khadagi Хадаги Хаӏдаӏгъи Хядягъи
- Selo
- Location within Republic of Dagestan Location within Russia
- Coordinates: 42°04′N 47°53′E
- Country: Russia
- Region: Republic of Dagestan
- District: Kaytagsky District
- Time zone: UTC+3:00

Khadagi (Russian: Хадаги; Kaitag: Хаӏдаӏгъи; Dargwa: Хядягъи) is a rural locality (a selo) in Dzhibakhninsky Selsoviet, Kaytagsky District, Republic of Dagestan, Russia. The population was 183 as of 2010. There are 3 streets.

== Geography ==
Khadagi is located 16 km southeast of Madzhalis (the district's administrative centre) by road. Kulegu, Dzhinabi and Dzhibakhni are the nearest rural localities.

== Nationalities ==
Dargins live there.
