= Mizhigli =

Mizhigli Мижигли Мижигъла Мижгъели
- Selo
- Location within Republic of Dagestan Location within Russia
- Coordinates: 42°04′N 47°48′E
- Country: Russia
- Region: Republic of Dagestan
- District: Kaytagsky District
- Time zone: UTC+3:00

Mizhigli (Russian: Мижигли; Kaitag: Мижигъла; Dargwa: Мижгъели) is a rural locality (a selo) in Shilyaginsky Selsoviet, Kaytagsky District, Republic of Dagestan, Russia. The population was 382 as of 2010. There are 21 streets.

== Geography ==
Mizhigli is located 7 km southwest of Madzhalis (the district's administrative centre) by road. Dzhigiya, Shilyagi and Kulidzha are the nearest rural localities.

== Nationalities ==
Dargins live there.
