= Surkhavkent =

Surkhavkent Сурхавкент Сурхавккент ЦӀурхавкент
- Selo
- Location within Republic of Dagestan Location within Russia
- Coordinates: 41°59′N 47°49′E
- Country: Russia
- Region: Republic of Dagestan
- District: Kaytagsky District
- Time zone: UTC+3:00

Surkhavkent (Russian: Сурхавкент; Kaitag: Сурхавккент; Dargwa: ЦӀурхавкент) is a rural locality (a selo) in Varsitsky Selsoviet, Kaytagsky District, Republic of Dagestan, Russia. The population was 40 as of 2010.

== Geography ==
Surkhavkent is located 25 km south of Madzhalis (the district's administrative centre) by road. Varsit and Shuragat are the nearest rural localities.

== Nationalities ==
Dargins live there.
