= Kudagu =

Kudagu Кудагу Ккудау
- Selo
- Location within Republic of Dagestan Location within Russia
- Coordinates: 42°07′N 47°43′E
- Country: Russia
- Region: Republic of Dagestan
- District: Dakhadayevsky District
- Time zone: UTC+3:00

Kudagu (Russian: Кудагу; Dargwa: Ккудау) is a rural locality (a selo) and the administrative centre of Kudaginsky Selsoviet, Dakhadayevsky District, Republic of Dagestan, Russia. The population was 561 as of 2010. There are 7 streets.

== Geography ==
Kudagu is located 12 km southeast of Urkarakh (the district's administrative centre) by road. Zilbachi and Zubanchi are the nearest rural localities.
