= Karkatsi =

Karkatsi Каркаци Къяркъяцимахьи
- Selo
- Location within Republic of Dagestan Location within Russia
- Coordinates: 42°05′N 47°27′E
- Country: Russia
- Region: Republic of Dagestan
- District: Dakhadayevsky District
- Time zone: UTC+3:00

Karkatsi (Russian: Каркаци; Dargwa: Къяркъяцимахьи) is a rural locality (a selo) in Urarinsky Selsoviet, Dakhadayevsky District, Republic of Dagestan, Russia. The population was 70 as of 2010.

== Geography ==
Karkatsi is located 39 km southwest of Urkarakh (the district's administrative centre) by road. Muskilimakhi and Kurkimakhi are the nearest rural localities.
