= Guladty =

Guladty Гуладты Гъуладти
- Selo
- Location within Republic of Dagestan Location within Russia
- Coordinates: 42°06′N 47°27′E
- Country: Russia
- Region: Republic of Dagestan
- District: Dakhadayevsky District
- Time zone: UTC+3:00

Guladty (Russian: Гуладты; Dargwa: Гъуладти) is a rural locality (a selo) and the administrative centre of Guladtynsky Selsoviet, Dakhadayevsky District, Republic of Dagestan, Russia. The population was 662 as of 2010. There are 2 streets.

== Geography ==
Guladty is located 29 km southeast of Urkarakh (the district's administrative centre) by road. Dzhirabachi and Trisanchi are the nearest rural localities.
