= Dibgashi =

Dibgashi Дибгаши
- Selo
- Location within Republic of Dagestan Location within Russia
- Coordinates: 42°09′N 47°41′E
- Country: Russia
- Region: Republic of Dagestan
- District: Dakhadayevsky District
- Time zone: UTC+3:00

Dibgashi (Russian: Дибгаши) is a rural locality (a selo) and the administrative centre of Dibgashinsky Selsoviet, Dakhadayevsky District, Republic of Dagestan, Russia. The population was 1,131 as of 2010. There are 3 streets.

== Geography ==
Dibgashi is located 9 km east of Urkarakh (the district's administrative centre) by road. Kalkni and Gunakari are the nearest rural localities.
