= Gunakari =

Gunakari Гунакари Гьунахъари
- Selo
- Location within Republic of Dagestan Location within Russia
- Coordinates: 42°10′N 47°41′E
- Country: Russia
- Region: Republic of Dagestan
- District: Dakhadayevsky District
- Time zone: UTC+3:00

Gunakari (Russian: Гунакари; Dargwa: Гьунахъари) is a rural locality (a selo) in Buskrinsky Selsoviet, Dakhadayevsky District, Republic of Dagestan, Russia. The population was 371 as of 2010. There are 2 streets.

== Geography ==
Gunakari is located 11 km northeast of Urkarakh (the district's administrative centre) by road. Kalkni and Dibgashi are the nearest rural localities.
