= Uragi =

Uragi Ураги Урагъи
- Selo
- Location within Republic of Dagestan Location within Russia
- Coordinates: 42°04′N 47°34′E
- Country: Russia
- Region: Republic of Dagestan
- District: Dakhadayevsky District
- Time zone: UTC+3:00

Uragi (Russian: Ураги; Dargwa: Урагъи) is a rural locality (a selo) and the administrative centre of Uraginsky Selsoviet, Dakhadayevsky District, Republic of Dagestan, Russia. The population was 319 as of 2010. There are 4 streets.

== Geography ==
Uragi is located 25 km southwest of Urkarakh (the district's administrative centre) by road. Dzilebki and Urtsaki are the nearest rural localities.
