= Tsizgari =

Tsizgari Цизгари ЦӀизгъари
- Selo
- Location within Republic of Dagestan Location within Russia
- Coordinates: 42°13′N 47°38′E
- Country: Russia
- Region: Republic of Dagestan
- District: Dakhadayevsky District
- Time zone: UTC+3:00

Tsizgari (Russian: Цизгари; Dargwa: ЦӀизгъари) is a rural locality (a selo) and the administrative centre of Tsizgarinsky Selsoviet, Dakhadayevsky District, Republic of Dagestan, Russia. The population was 353 as of 2010. There are 3 streets.

== Geography ==
Tsizgari is located 11 km northeast of Urkarakh (the district's administrative centre) by road. Meusisha and Buskri are the nearest rural localities.
