= Kishcha =

Rural locality in Russia

Kishcha Кища Кӏиша
- Selo
- Location within Republic of Dagestan Location within Russia
- Coordinates: 42°10′N 47°35′E
- Country: Russia
- Region: Republic of Dagestan
- District: Dakhadayevsky District
- Time zone: UTC+3:00

Kishcha (Russian: Кища; Dargwa: Кӏиша) is a rural locality (a selo) and the administrative centre of Kishchinsky Selsoviet, Dakhadayevsky District, Republic of Dagestan, Russia. The population was 3,030 as of 2010. There are 23 streets.

== Geography ==
Kishcha is located 7 km northwest of Urkarakh (the district's administrative centre) by road. Meusisha and Kharbuk are the nearest rural localities.
