= Kalkni =

Kalkni Калкни Кьялкни
- Selo
- Location within Republic of Dagestan Location within Russia
- Coordinates: 42°10′N 47°42′E
- Country: Russia
- Region: Republic of Dagestan
- District: Dakhadayevsky District
- Time zone: UTC+3:00

Kalkni (Russian: Калкни; Dargwa: Кьялкни) is a rural locality (a selo) in Dakhadayevsky District, Republic of Dagestan, Russia. The population was 1,317 as of 2010.

== Geography ==
Kalkni is located 12 km northeast of Urkarakh (the district's administrative centre) by road. Gunakari and Dibgashi are the nearest rural localities.
