= Urkhnishcha =

Urkhnishcha Урхнища Урхьниша
- Selo
- Location within Republic of Dagestan Location within Russia
- Coordinates: 42°04′N 47°30′E
- Country: Russia
- Region: Republic of Dagestan
- District: Dakhadayevsky District
- Time zone: UTC+3:00

Urkhnishcha (Russian: Урхнища; Dargwa: Урхьниша) is a rural locality (a selo) in Urarinsky Selsoviet, Dakhadayevsky District, Republic of Dagestan, Russia. The population was 290 as of 2010. There are 2 streets.

== Geography ==
Urkhnishcha is located 32 km southwest of Urkarakh (the district's administrative centre) by road. Urkutamakhi 1-ya and Kurkimakhi are the nearest rural localities.
