= Gulli (disambiguation) =

Gulli is a French television network. Gulli may also refer to

- Gulli, Republic of Dagestan, a rural locality in Dagestan, Russia
- Gulli.com, an internet portal for Germany and German-speaking regions
- Gulli Petrini (1867–1941), Swedish physicist, writer, suffragette and politician
- Jessica Gulli (born 1988), Australian sprinter
