= Tsurai, Republic of Dagestan =

Tsurai Цураи Цурагӏи
- Selo
- Location within Republic of Dagestan Location within Russia
- Coordinates: 42°14′N 47°39′E
- Country: Russia
- Region: Republic of Dagestan
- District: Dakhadayevsky District
- Time zone: UTC+3:00

Tsurai (Russian: Цураи; Dargwa: Цурагӏи) is a rural locality (a selo) in Tsizgarinsky Selsoviet, Dakhadayevsky District, Republic of Dagestan, Russia. The population was 189 as of 2010.

== Geography ==
Tsurai is located 15 km northeast of Urkarakh (the district's administrative centre) by road. Tsizgari and Kanasiragi are the nearest rural localities.
