= Urari =

Urari Урари
- Selo
- Location within Republic of Dagestan Location within Russia
- Coordinates: 42°05′N 47°27′E
- Country: Russia
- Region: Republic of Dagestan
- District: Dakhadayevsky District
- Time zone: UTC+3:00

Urari (Russian: Урари) is a rural locality (a selo) and the administrative centre of Urarinsky Selsoviet, Dakhadayevsky District, Republic of Dagestan, Russia. The population was 846 as of 2010. There are 10 streets.

== Geography ==
Urari is located 37 km southwest of Urkarakh (the district's administrative centre) by road. Turakarimakhi and Kurkimakhi are the nearest rural localities.
