= Sanchi, Republic of Dagestan =

Sanchi Санчи Санджи
- Selo
- Location within Republic of Dagestan Location within Russia
- Coordinates: 42°07′N 47°49′E
- Country: Russia
- Region: Republic of Dagestan
- District: Kaytagsky District
- Time zone: UTC+3:00

Sanchi (Russian: Санчи; Dargwa: Санджи) is a rural locality (a selo) in Kaytagsky District, Republic of Dagestan, Russia. The population was 1,798 as of 2010. There are 7 streets.

== Geography ==
Sanchi is located on the left bank of the Ulluchay River. It is located 2 km northwest of Madzhalis (the district's administrative centre) by road. Madzhalis and Akhmedkent are the nearest rural localities.

== Nationalities ==
Dargins live there.
