= Bakni =

Bakni Бакни Бакьни
- Selo
- Location within Republic of Dagestan Location within Russia
- Coordinates: 42°06′N 47°31′E
- Country: Russia
- Region: Republic of Dagestan
- District: Dakhadayevsky District
- Time zone: UTC+3:00

Bakni (Russian: Бакни; Dargwa: Бакьни) is a rural locality (a selo) in Sutbuksky Selsoviet, Dakhadayevsky District, Republic of Dagestan, Russia. The population was 249 as of 2010. There are 3 streets.

== Geography ==
Bakni is located 32 km southwest of Urkarakh (the district's administrative centre) by road. Sutbuk and Urtsaki are the nearest rural localities.
