= Rodnikovy, Republic of Dagestan =

Rodnikovy Родниковый
- Selo
- Location within Republic of Dagestan Location within Russia
- Coordinates: 42°09′N 47°56′E
- Country: Russia
- Region: Republic of Dagestan
- District: Kaytagsky District
- Time zone: UTC+3:00

Rodnikovy (Russian: Родниковый) is a rural locality (a selo) in Madzhalissky Selsoviet, Kaytagsky District, Republic of Dagestan, Russia. The population was 757 as of 2010. There are 21 streets.

== Geography ==
Rodnikovy is located 11 km northeast of Madzhalis (the district's administrative centre) by road. Madzhalis and Sanchi are the nearest rural localities.

== Nationalities ==
Dargins live there.
