= Sumiya, Republic of Dagestan =

Sumiya Сумия Сумиямахьи
- Selo
- Location within Republic of Dagestan Location within Russia
- Coordinates: 42°02′N 47°27′E
- Country: Russia
- Region: Republic of Dagestan
- District: Dakhadayevsky District
- Time zone: UTC+3:00

Sumiya (Russian: Сумия; Dargwa: Сумиямахьи) is a rural locality (a selo) in Duakarsky Selsoviet, Dakhadayevsky District, Republic of Dagestan, Russia. The population was 149 as of 2010.

== Geography ==
Sumiya is located 36 km southwest of Urkarakh (the district's administrative centre) by road. Duakar and Karbuchimakhi are the nearest rural localities.
