= Sutbuk =

Sutbuk Сутбук СутбукӀ
- Selo
- Location within Republic of Dagestan Location within Russia
- Coordinates: 42°06′N 47°32′E
- Country: Russia
- Region: Republic of Dagestan
- District: Dakhadayevsky District
- Time zone: UTC+3:00

Sutbuk (Russian: Сутбук; Dargwa: СутбукӀ) is a rural locality (a selo) and the administrative centre of Sutbuksky Selsoviet, Dakhadayevsky District, Republic of Dagestan, Russia. The population was 285 as of 2010. There are 4 streets.

== Geography ==
Sutbuk is located 30 km southwest of Urkarakh (the district's administrative centre) by road. Urtsaki and Uragi are the nearest rural localities.
