= Zilbachi =

Zilbachi Зильбачи
- Selo
- Location within Republic of Dagestan Location within Russia
- Coordinates: 42°08′N 47°43′E
- Country: Russia
- Region: Republic of Dagestan
- District: Dakhadayevsky District
- Time zone: UTC+3:00

Zilbachi (Russian: Зильбачи) is a rural locality (a selo) in Dakhadayevsky District, Republic of Dagestan, Russia. The population was 937 as of 2010. There are 6 streets.

== Geography ==
Zilbachi is located 10 km southeast of Urkarakh (the district's administrative centre) by road. Zubanchi and Kudagu are the nearest rural localities.
