= Iragi =

Iragi Ираги Ирагъи
- Selo
- Location within Republic of Dagestan Location within Russia
- Coordinates: 42°07′N 47°45′E
- Country: Russia
- Region: Republic of Dagestan
- District: Dakhadayevsky District
- Time zone: UTC+3:00

Iragi (Russian: Ираги; Dargwa: Ирагъи) is a rural locality (a selo) in Kudaginsky Selsoviet, Dakhadayevsky District, Republic of Dagestan, Russia. The population was 843 as of 2010. There are 7 streets.

== Geography ==
Iragi is located 17 km southeast of Urkarakh (the district's administrative centre) by road. Kudagu and Trisanchi are the nearest rural localities.
