= Duakar =

Duakar Дуакар ДугIахъар
- Selo
- Location within Republic of Dagestan Location within Russia
- Coordinates: 42°03′N 47°27′E
- Country: Russia
- Region: Republic of Dagestan
- District: Dakhadayevsky District
- Time zone: UTC+3:00

Duakar (Russian: Дуакар; Dargwa: ДугIахъар) is a rural locality (a selo) and the administrative centre of Duakarsky Selsoviet, Dakhadayevsky District, Republic of Dagestan, Russia. The population was 250 as of 2010.

== Geography ==
Duakar is located 34 southwest km of Urkarakh (the district's administrative centre) by road. Urari and Guladty are the nearest rural localities.
