= Chishili =

Chishili Чишили ЧӀишили
- Selo
- Location within Republic of Dagestan Location within Russia
- Coordinates: 42°09′N 47°40′E
- Country: Russia
- Region: Republic of Dagestan
- District: Dakhadayevsky District
- Time zone: UTC+3:00

Chishili (Russian: Чишили; Dargwa: ЧӀишили) is a rural locality (a selo) in Dakhadayevsky District, Republic of Dagestan, Russia. The population was 551 as of 2010. There is one street.

== Geography ==
Chishili is located 5 km southeast of Urkarakh (the district's administrative centre) by road. Urkarakh and Buskri are the nearest rural localities.
