= Meusisha =

Meusisha Меусиша
- Selo
- Location within Republic of Dagestan Location within Russia
- Coordinates: 42°12′N 47°35′E
- Country: Russia
- Region: Republic of Dagestan
- District: Dakhadayevsky District
- Time zone: UTC+3:00

Meusisha (Russian: Меусиша) is a rural locality (a selo) in Dakhadayevsky District, Republic of Dagestan, Russia. The population was 1,375 as of 2010. There are 16 streets.

== Geography ==
Meusisha is located 7 km northwest of Urkarakh (the district's administrative centre) by road. Kishcha and Urkarakh are the nearest rural localities.
