= Gulli, Republic of Dagestan =

Gulli Гулли Гьулли Хӏурри
- Selo
- Location within Republic of Dagestan Location within Russia
- Coordinates: 42°13′N 47°45′E
- Country: Russia
- Region: Republic of Dagestan
- District: Kaytagsky District
- Time zone: UTC+3:00

Gulli (Russian: Гулли; Kaitag: Гьулли; Dargwa: Хӏурри) is a rural locality (a selo) in Kaytagsky District, Republic of Dagestan, Russia. The population was 2,056 as of 2010. There are 6 streets.

== Geography ==
Gulli is located 20 km northwest of Madzhalis (the district's administrative centre) by road. Chumli and Kapkaykent are the nearest rural localities.

== Nationalities ==
Dargins live there.
