= Ayatsuri =

Ayatsuri Аяцури ГӀяяцӀуримахьи
- Selo
- Location within Republic of Dagestan Location within Russia
- Coordinates: 42°04′N 47°27′E
- Country: Russia
- Region: Republic of Dagestan
- District: Dakhadayevsky District
- Time zone: UTC+3:00

Ayatsuri (Russian: Аяцури; Dargwa: ГӀяяцӀуримахьи) is a rural locality (a selo) in Urarinsky Selsoviet, Dakhadayevsky District, Republic of Dagestan, Russia. The population was 150 as of 2010. There is one street in the village.

== Geography ==
Ayatsuri is located 41 km southwest of Urkarakh (the district's administrative centre) by road. Butulta and Mukranari are the nearest rural localities.
