= Shadni =

Shadni Шадни Шадун
- Selo
- Location within Republic of Dagestan Location within Russia
- Coordinates: 42°11′N 47°38′E
- Country: Russia
- Region: Republic of Dagestan
- District: Dakhadayevsky District
- Time zone: UTC+3:00

Shadni (Russian: Шадни; Lak: Шадун) is a rural locality (a selo) in Tsizgarinsky Selsoviet, Dakhadayevsky District, Republic of Dagestan, Russia. The population was 300 as of 2010. There are 2 streets.

== Geography ==
Shadni is located 9 km northeast of Urkarakh (the district's administrative centre) by road. Urkarakh and Meusisha are the nearest rural localities.
