= Dzhurmachi =

Dzhurmachi Джурмачи Журмачи
- Selo
- Location within Republic of Dagestan Location within Russia
- Coordinates: 42°05′N 47°41′E
- Country: Russia
- Region: Republic of Dagestan
- District: Dakhadayevsky District
- Time zone: UTC+3:00

Dzhurmachi (Russian: Джурмачи; Dargwa: Журмачи) is a rural locality (a selo) in Trisanchinsky Selsoviet, Dakhadayevsky District, Republic of Dagestan, Russia. The population was 155 as of 2010.

== Geography ==
Dzhurmachi is located 14 km southeast of Urkarakh (the district's administrative centre) by road. Daknisa and Dzhirabachi are the nearest rural localities.
