= Dzilebki =

Dzilebki Дзилебки ЗилебкӀи
- Selo
- Location within Republic of Dagestan Location within Russia
- Coordinates: 42°02′N 47°33′E
- Country: Russia
- Region: Republic of Dagestan
- District: Dakhadayevsky District
- Time zone: UTC+3:00

Dzilebki (Russian: Дзилебки; Dargwa: ЗилебкӀи) is a rural locality (a selo) in Uraginsky Selsoviet, Dakhadayevsky District, Republic of Dagestan, Russia. The population was 711 as of 2010. There are 6 streets.

== Geography ==
Dzilebki is located 30 km southwest of Urkarakh (the district's administrative centre) by road. Urtsaki and Kubachi are the nearest rural localities.
