= Ayatsimakhi =

Ayatsimakhi Аяцимахи ГIяяцимахьи
- Selo
- Location within Republic of Dagestan Location within Russia
- Coordinates: 42°00′N 47°27′E
- Country: Russia
- Region: Republic of Dagestan
- District: Dakhadayevsky District
- Time zone: UTC+3:00

Ayatsimakhi (Russian: Аяцимахи; Dargwa: ГIяяцимахьи) is a rural locality (a selo) in Karbuchimakhinsky Selsoviet, Dakhadayevsky District, Republic of Dagestan, Russia. The population was 126 as of 2010. There is one street in the village.

== Geography ==
Ayatsimakhi is located 41 km southwest of Urkarakh (the district's administrative centre) by road. Karbuchimakhi and Duakar are the nearest rural localities.
