= Kirki, Republic of Dagestan =

Kirki Кирки Хъерхъай Хъирхъи
- Selo
- Location within Republic of Dagestan Location within Russia
- Coordinates: 41°58′N 47°48′E
- Country: Russia
- Region: Republic of Dagestan
- District: Kaytagsky District
- Time zone: UTC+3:00

Kirki (Russian: Кирки; Kaitag: Хъерхъай; Dargwa: Хъирхъи) is a rural locality (a selo) and the administrative centre of Kirkinsky Selsoviet, Kaytagsky District, Republic of Dagestan, Russia. The population was 174 as of 2010.

== Geography ==
Kirki is located 29 km southwest of Madzhalis (the district's administrative centre) by road. Turaga and Kuzhnik are the nearest rural localities.

== Nationalities ==
Dargins live there.
