= Khurshni =

Khurshni Хуршни
- Selo
- Location within Republic of Dagestan Location within Russia
- Coordinates: 42°08′N 47°29′E
- Country: Russia
- Region: Republic of Dagestan
- District: Dakhadayevsky District
- Time zone: UTC+3:00

Khurshni (Russian: Хуршни) is a rural locality (a selo) in Dakhadayevsky District, Republic of Dagestan, Russia. The population was 329 as of 2010. There are 8 streets.

== Geography ==
Khurshni is located 24 km west of Urkarakh (the district's administrative centre) by road. Mirzita and Kharbuk are the nearest rural localities.
