= Mukrakari =

Mukrakari Мукракари Муркарахъмахьи
- Selo
- Location within Republic of Dagestan Location within Russia
- Coordinates: 42°03′N 47°29′E
- Country: Russia
- Region: Republic of Dagestan
- District: Dakhadayevsky District
- Time zone: UTC+3:00

Mukrakari (Russian: Мукракари; Dargwa: Муркарахъмахьи) is a rural locality (a selo) in Duakarsky Selsoviet, Dakhadayevsky District, Republic of Dagestan, Russia. The population was 135 as of 2010.

== Geography ==
Mukrakari is located 31 km southwest of Urkarakh (the district's administrative centre) by road. Duakar and Urkutamakhi 1-ya are the nearest rural localities.
