= Kirki =

Kirki may refer to:

- Khadki, a town near Pune in Maharashtra, India
- Kirki (tanker), an oil tanker causing the oil spill outside of Australia on 21 July 1991
- Kirki, Republic of Dagestan, a rural locality in Dagestan, Russia
- the Andean instrument Charango
- the Indian city founded in 1610 that was renamed Aurangabad in 1653
