= Jewish Sloboda (Dagestan) =

Jewish Sloboda Еврейская Слобода Tuben-Aul
- Village
- Location within Republic of Dagestan Location within Russia
- Coordinates: 42°07′53″N 47°50′17″E
- Country: Russia
- Region: Republic of Dagestan
- District: Kaytagsky District

Population
  - Total: 0
- Time zone: UTC+03:00

The Jewish Sloboda, also known as Tuben-Aul (Russian: Еврейская Слобода) is an abolished village in the Kaytagsky District of the Republic of Dagestan. In the 1930s it was included in the village of Madzhalis.

== Geography ==
The village was located on the left bank of the Ulluchay River, below the confluence of the Kotta stream. Currently it represents the lower part of the village of Madzhalis.

== History ==
Before the Russian Revolution of 1917, a large community of Mountain Jews lived in Madzhalis, making up the Tuben-Aul (Lower Village) quarter. According to information from Valerian Zubov, a participant in the Persian expedition of 1796 in Madzhalis there were up to 200 houses of Mountain Jews who lived compactly in a quarter, separately from other residents of Madzhalis. It was a separate quarter on the edge of the village, where Mountain Jews moved from the gorge around the end of the 17th - beginning of the 18th centuries. A synagogue (closed in the 1930s, currently a residential building) and a Jewish school operated in the quarter. In 1886, Mountain Jews owned 4 grocery stores and 5 manufacturing shops, owned 70 huts, 12.5 acres of arable land, 9 dessiatin of meadows, 3 gardens, 30 cattle, 25 horses. 25 Jews were engaged in tanning leather. Apparently, in the early 1920s, the Mountain Jewish quarter was separated into an independent settlement - the village of Jewish Sloboda. According to data for 1929, the village of Jewish Sloboda consisted of 69 households. Administratively, it was part of the Madzhalis village council of the Kaytagsky region of the Dagestan ASSR. In 1930, the Mountain Jewish agricultural artel “Kirmizy” (Red) was created, which united 12 households. Later, a collective farm named after Kaganovich was created on the basis of the artel. In 1938, the Kaganovich collective farm was merged with the “May First” collective farm in the village of Madzhalis. This circumstance led to the fact that Mountain Jews began to gradually leave the village, as they believed that it infringed on their interests.

== Population ==
Statistical population
| Year | 1867 | 1886 | 1897 | 1900 | 1926 |
|---|---|---|---|---|---|
| population | 439 | 529 | 512 | 530 | 306 |

In 1867, 439 Mountain Jews lived in Madzhalis, in 1886–529, in 1897–512 (35.6%), in 1900–530. According to the 1926 Soviet census, 306 people lived in Jewish Sloboda (158 men and 148 women), this made up 100% of the population from Mountain Jews.
