= Kunki, Republic of Dagestan =

Kunki Кунки Кьункьи
- Selo
- Location within Republic of Dagestan Location within Russia
- Coordinates: 41°57′N 47°28′E
- Country: Russia
- Region: Republic of Dagestan
- District: Dakhadayevsky District
- Time zone: UTC+3:00

Kunki (Russian: Кунки; Dargwa: Кьункьи) is a rural locality (a selo) in Dakhadayevsky District, Republic of Dagestan, Russia. The population was 780 as of 2010. There are 16 streets.

== Geography ==
Kunki is located 52 km southwest of Urkarakh (the district's administrative centre) by road. Ashty and Khuduts are the nearest rural localities.
