= Novy Urkarakh =

Novy Urkarakh Новый Уркарах Сагаси Уркарахъ
- Selo
- Location within Republic of Dagestan Location within Russia
- Coordinates: 42°09′N 47°37′E
- Country: Russia
- Region: Republic of Dagestan
- District: Dakhadayevsky District
- Time zone: UTC+3:00

Novy Urkarakh (Russian: Новый Уркарах; Dargwa: Сагаси Уркарахъ) is a rural locality (a selo) in Urkarkhsky Selsoviet, Dakhadayevsky District, Republic of Dagestan, Russia. The population was 1,101 as of 2010. There are 9 streets.
