= Dargwa =

Dargwa (or Dargin) may refer to:

- Dargwa people, a people of the Caucasus in southern Dagestan
- Dargwa language, their language
