= Chumli =

Chumli Чумли
- Selo
- Location within Republic of Dagestan Location within Russia
- Coordinates: 42°12′N 47°46′E
- Country: Russia
- Region: Republic of Dagestan
- District: Kaytagsky District
- Time zone: UTC+3:00

Chumli (Russian: Чумли) is a rural locality (a selo) in Kaytagsky District, Republic of Dagestan, Russia. The population was 1,870 as of 2010. There are 14 streets.

== Geography ==
Chumli is located on the Yangichay River, 18 km northwest of Madzhalis (the district's administrative centre) by road. Gulli and Yangikent are the nearest rural localities.

== Nationalities ==
Dargins live there.
