= Kaitag Utsmiate =

Feudal political entity in North Caucasus

- 5th century — 1820
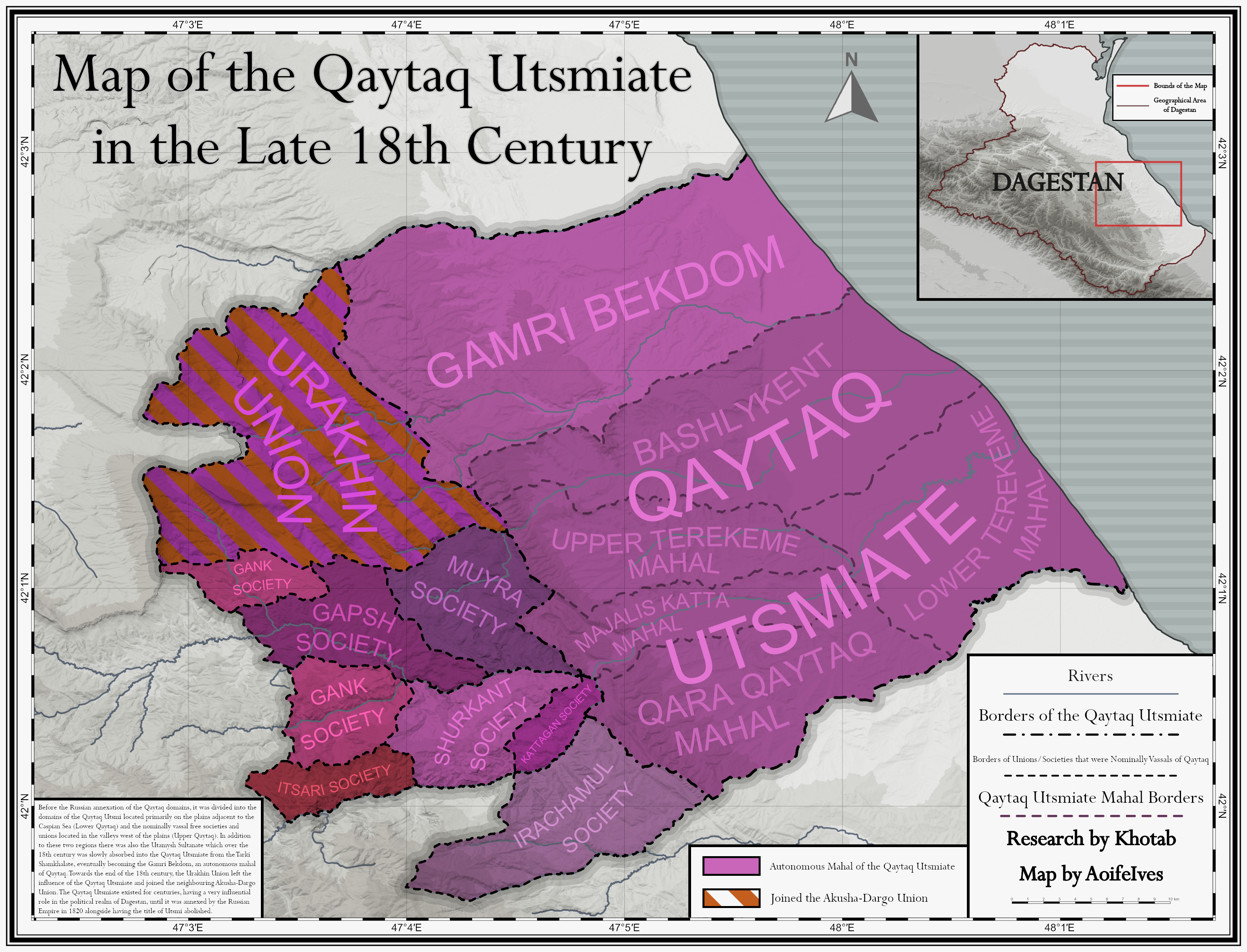
- Status: Principality
- Capital: Jalagi; Qala-Quraish; Urkarakh; Majalis; Bashly
- Official languages: Arabic, Kaitag, Kumyk
- Common languages: Muirin, Sanzhi-Itsari, Kubachi, Kaitag, Judeo-Tat, Kumyk, Azerbaijani
- Religion: Islam; Judaism (minority); Christianity (till 15th c.); Paganism (till 17th c.)
- The Utsmi of Kaitag

Area
  - Total: 3,200 km^{2} (1,200 sq mi)

Population
  - 17th century estimate: 20,000–50,000
| Preceded by | Succeeded by |
| Caucasian Albania | Russian Empire |
- Today part of: Dagestan

The Kaitag Utsmiate, also known as the Qaytaq Utsmiate, was a multiethnic feudal political entity in the North Caucasus. The first mentions of it appear in chronicles from the 5th century, and it was eliminated in 1820 during the Russian conquest of the Caucasus. The state's territory included Kaitag, Dakhaday and parts of Segokala, Derbent, Kayakent districts of modern Dagestan.
