= Kala Koreysh =

Kala Koreysh Кьара-Кьурейш
- Abandoned village
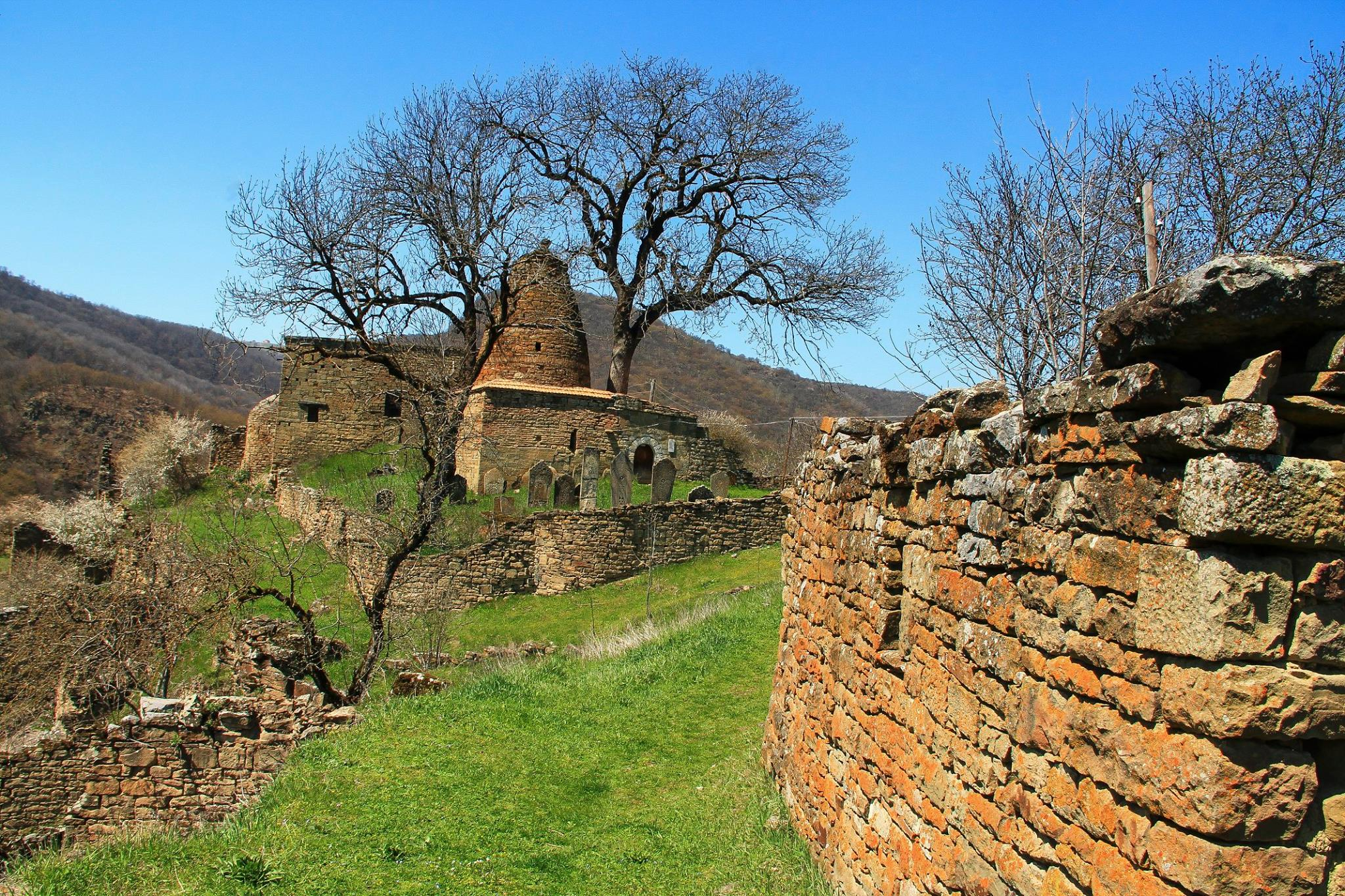

- Location within Republic of Dagestan Location within Russia
- Coordinates: 42°06′09″N 47°39′26″E
- Country: Russia
- Republic: Dagestan
- District: Dakhadayevsky

Kala Koreysh (Russian: Кала-Корейш, Dargwa: Кьара-Кьурейш) is an abandoned village in the Dakhadaevsky district of Dagestan. It served as the medieval capital of the Kaitag Utsmiate and was a large feudal estate. The main attraction of the village are the mosque (founded in the 11th century).

== Population ==
According to the Soviet Census of 1926, the Kaitag people made up 100% of the national population structure.

| Year | 1895 | 1908 | 1926 | 1939 |
|---|---|---|---|---|
| Population | 269 | 222 | 287 | 307 |

== Sources ==
- Эпиграфические памятники Северного Кавказа на арабском, персидском и турецком языках. Ч.1. Надписи X - XII вв (PDF). Lavrov. 1966 [Epigraphic monuments of the North Caucasus in Arabic, Persian and Turkish. Part 1. Inscriptions X - XII centuries].
