= Khalag =

Khalag Халаг Халагъ
- Selo
- Location within Republic of Dagestan Location within Russia
- Coordinates: 41°54′N 47°53′E
- Country: Russia
- Region: Republic of Dagestan
- District: Tabasaransky District
- Time zone: UTC+3:00

Khalag (Russian: Халаг; Tabassaran: Халагъ) is a rural locality (a selo) and the administrative centre of Khalagsky Selsoviet, Tabasaransky District, Republic of Dagestan, Russia. Population: 678 (2010 census); 727 (2002 census); 638 (1989 Soviet census). There are 3 streets.

== Geography ==
Khalag is located 18 km southwest of Khuchni (the district's administrative centre) by road. Bukhnag is the nearest rural locality.
