= Gulli.com =

Gulli.com was a German-language internet portal and board, founded in 1998 by Randolf Jorberg. Its themes were the Internet, IT security, cyberculture, file Sharing, internet privacy, information privacy and intellectual property.

The site was excluded from the Wayback Machine.

== History ==
In the beginning, the project was only available under steadily changing internet addresses due to problems with illegal content, but grew into one of the largest German-language online communities.

In February 2008 gulli.com was acquired by the Inqnet GmbH in Vienna and the parting team, Richard "Korrupt" Joos, Randolf "gulli" Jorberg and Axel "LexaT" Gönnemann published a book named gulli wars in August 2008, talking about the cyber war tales experienced. In July 2013 gulli.com was sold to Gamigo AG.

The board had more than 1 million registered users. It cooperated with companies and hackers concerning net security, such as PayPal in 2011.

Since 2018, the board is unavailable, with a placeholder website promising its return.

== Literature ==
- Richard Joos, Randolf Jorberg, Axel Gönnemann: gulli wars™. Books on Demand GmbH, 2008, ISBN 978-3-8370-4294-8.
- Daniel Hofmann: Heimliche Riesen im Netz - Vergemeinschaftung um Sharehoster am Beispiel einer Online-Tauschbörse. GRIN, 2008, ISBN 978-3-640-21181-4
