= Dyubek =

Dyubek Дюбек Тӏивак
- Selo
- Location within Republic of Dagestan Location within Russia
- Coordinates: 42°01′N 47°58′E
- Country: Russia
- Region: Republic of Dagestan
- District: Tabasaransky District
- Time zone: UTC+3:00

Dyubek (Russian: Дюбек; Tabassaran: Тӏивак) is a rural locality (a selo) and the administrative centre of Dyubeksky Selsoviet, Tabasaransky District, Republic of Dagestan, Russia. Population: 1,894 (2010 census); 1,909 (2002 census); 1,661 (1989 Soviet census). There are 6 streets.

== Geography ==
Dyubek is located 11 km north of Khuchni (the district's administrative centre) by road. Gurkhun and Khustil are the nearest rural localities.
