= Kai Tak (disambiguation) =

Kai Tak Airport was the international airport of Hong Kong from 1925 until 1998.

Kai Tak Development is an urban development plan for the Kai Tak old airport site.

Kai Tak or Kai-tak may also refer to the following, all of which are located at the former site, or near the former airport:

- Kai Tak Cruise Terminal, a cruise terminal in New Kowloon, Hong Kong
- Kai Tak Nullah, nullah in northern New Kowloon, Hong Kong
- Kai Tak station, Hong Kong railway station on the Tuen Ma Line of the Shatin-Central Link
- Kai Tak Sports Park, sports stadium to be built at the site of the original Kai Tak Airport
- Kai Tak Tunnel, tunnel in New Kowloon, Hong Kong
- RAF Kai Tak, former Royal Air Force station in Hong Kong
- Kai Tak (constituency), a former constituency in the Kowloon City District

== See also ==
- Typhoon Kai-tak (disambiguation)
