= Kaitag textiles =

Embroidered textile art form from the Kaytagsky District of southeast Dagestan, Russia

An early 19th century Kaitag textile

Kaitag textiles are an unusual embroidered textile art form from the Kaytagsky District of southeast Dagestan, Russia, inhabited mainly by Dargins and Kumyks. Kaitag textiles are of simple construction, being laid and couched silk-floss embroidery on a cotton ground. The designs are often in the style of classical Safavid Persian art, sometimes illustrating horsemen and hunting scenes. Abstract Kaitag designs have been compared to those of Matisse and Paul Klee, though it is unlikely that either artist ever saw a Kaitag textile. Surviving examples are mostly from the 17th and 18th centuries. These embroideries were apparently made for local use in weddings, funerals, and for cradle trappings.

== Bibliography ==
- Textile Gallery (London), 1996, Textile Art of the Caucasus, exhibit catalog, privately printed. Primary source.
