= Ullu-Terkeme =

Ullu-Terkeme Уллу-Теркеме Уллу-Тәрәкәмә
- Selo
- Location within Republic of Dagestan Location within Russia
- Coordinates: 42°13′N 48°00′E
- Country: Russia
- Region: Republic of Dagestan
- District: Derbentsky District
- Time zone: UTC+3:00

Ullu-Terkeme (Russian: Уллу-Теркеме; Azerbaijani: Уллу-Тәрәкәмә, Ullu-Tərəkəmə) is a rural locality (a selo) in Derbentsky District, Republic of Dagestan, Russia. The population was 1,599 as of 2010. There are 23 streets.

== Geography ==
Ullu-Terkeme is located 32 km northwest of Derbent (the district's administrative centre) by road. Tatlyar and Druzhba are the nearest rural localities.

== Nationalities ==
Azerbaijanis live there.
