= Dzhemikent =

Dzhemikent Джемикент Ҹәмикәнд
- Selo
- Location within Republic of Dagestan Location within Russia
- Coordinates: 42°14′N 48°02′E
- Country: Russia
- Region: Republic of Dagestan
- District: Derbentsky District
- Time zone: UTC+3:00

Dzhemikent (Russian: Джемикент; Azerbaijani: Ҹәмикәнд, Cəmikənd) is a rural locality (a selo) in Derbentsky District, Republic of Dagestan, Russia. The population was 2,555 as of 2010. There are 27 streets.

== Geography ==
Dzhemikent is located 30 km northwest of Derbent (the district's administrative centre) by road. Druzhba and Berikey are the nearest rural localities.

== Nationalities ==
Azerbaijanis and Dargins live there.
