= Bashlykent =

Bashlykent Башлыкент Башлы
- Selo
- Location within Republic of Dagestan Location within Russia
- Coordinates: 42°15′N 47°50′E
- Country: Russia
- Region: Republic of Dagestan
- District: Kayakentsky District
- Time zone: UTC+3:00

Bashlykent (Russian: Башлыкент; Kumyk: Башлы, Başlı) is a rural locality (a selo) in Kayakentsky District, Republic of Dagestan, Russia. The population was 3,230 as of 2010. There are 23 streets.

== Geography ==
Bashlykent is located 29 km southwest of Novokayakent (the district's administrative centre) by road. Dzhavankent and Kapkaykent are the nearest rural localities.

== Nationalities ==
Kumyks live there.

== Famous residents ==
- Sakinat Gadzhiyeva (scientist-ethnographer, Doctor of Historical Sciences, Professor, Honored Scientist of the Russian Federation and the Republic of Dagestan)
- Balash Balashov (State Duma deputy)
