= Dargins =

Northeast Caucasian ethnic group

Dargin
Дарганти (Dargwa)
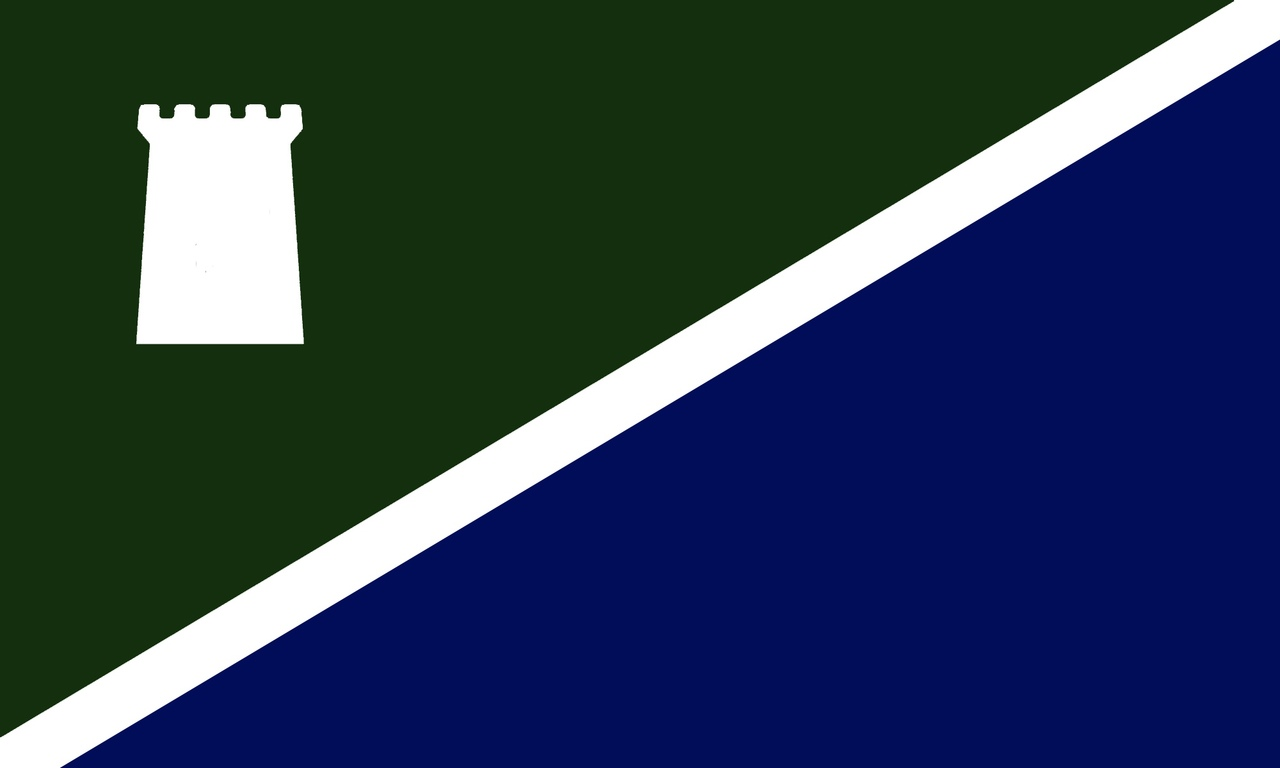
- Dargin flag

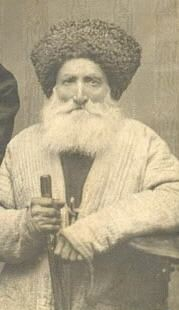
- A Dargin man, c. late 1800s

Total population
- 700,000 (est.)

Regions with significant populations
- Russia: Dagestan: 521,381: 626,601
- Levashinsky District: 70,704
- Akushinsky District: 53,558
- Dakhadayevsky District: 36,709
- Kaytagsky District: 31,368
- Sergokalinsky District: 27,133
- Ukraine: 1,610

Languages
- Dargin languages

Religion
- Majority: Sunni Islam

Related ethnic groups
- Laks

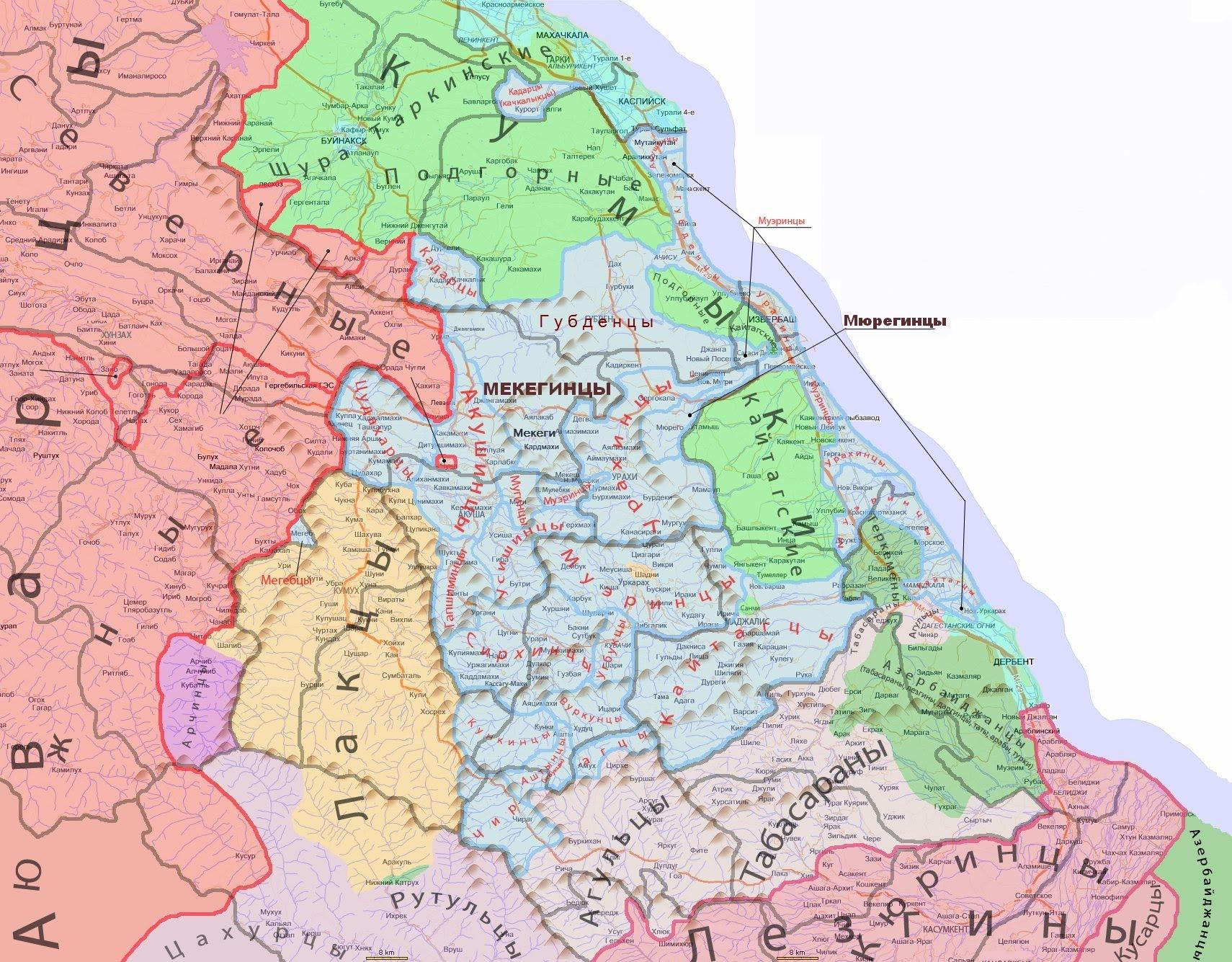
Map of Dargins and subethnic groups

Dargins or Dargwa (Dargwa: дарганти, romanized: darganti) are a Northeast Caucasian native ethnic group originating in the North Caucasus, and who make up the second largest ethnic group in the North Caucasian republic of Dagestan. They speak the various Dargin languages.

According to the 2021 Census, Dargins make up 16.6% of the population of Dagestan, with 521,381 people. They are concentrated in the Kaytagsky District, Dakhadayevsky District, Levashinsky District, Akushinsky District and Sergokalinsky Districts.

The Dargins have lived in their present-day location for many centuries. They formed the state of Kaitag in the Middle Ages and Renaissance until Russian conquest. Today, the Dargins are one of the most numerous ethnic groups in Dagestan (an amalgamation of many of the historical peoples in the region), the second most numerous after Avars.

== Origin ==
Regarding the origin of Northeast Caucasian peoples, two hypotheses were put forward — the autochthonous one (developed in the works of M.G. Abdushelishvili, V. P. Alekseev, etc.), arguing for an indigenous origin and the migration one (proposed by G. F. Debets), arguing for an exogenous origin.

== Genetics ==
According to genetic studies in 2023, the following haplogroups are found to predominate among Dargins (Dargwa, Kaitaks, Kubachis):

- J1 (81%)
- R1a (11%)
- R1b (2%)
- G2, T (2%)

== Culture ==
The infrastructure and architecture of the Dargin people was extremely well developed compared to their neighbors throughout history. The folk masters of this art displayed a very high level of achievement in building and ornamenting towers and fortresses, building the ensembles of buildings, mosques, bridges, and building irrigation constructions at springs and wells. The artistry of the Dargins is clearly shown in their decorative and applied art: in the creations of the Kubachi silversmiths; in the work of stonecutters, toolmakers, woodworkers, and ceramic and tile workers; in weaving, leatherwork, and fur work; and in spirited folk dance and vocal music. Dargins are known for their Kaitag textiles, from Kaytagsky District. The spiritual and religious center of Dargin nation was Akusha-Dargo. The head judicial court of all Dargins was also in Akusha. Other famous Dargin cities were Levashi, Mekegi, Kubachi and Kadar.

Prior to Russia's annexation of Dargi regions, Dargi medicine was a combination of folk and Eastern medicine. Folk healers (khakim) achieved considerable success in the treatment of wounds, bruises, broken bones, and dislocations and even in trephination; they were also skilled in phytotherapy and treatment of various internal diseases. The best-known healers were Murtuzali Haji of Butri, who studied medicine in Cairo for five years, worked with the Russian surgeon N. I. Pirogov, and was given a set of surgical instruments by him; Taimaz of Urakhi; Mohammed Haji of Khajalmakhi; Davud Haji of Akusha'; Alisultan Haji of Urkarakh; and others. Medical service was instituted only in 1894, with nine doctors and twelve nurses for all of Dagestan, a ratio of one medical practitioner to 60,000 persons. Now there is a paramedical station in every settled place, or a regional doctor, or a regional, district, or interdistrict hospital and a first-aid service with its own transport, including air transport.

== Religion ==
Dargins are mostly Sunni Muslims of the Shafi'i school.

== Notable Dargins ==
- Taimas Gubdensky, Dargin warrior from the Caucasian War.
- Abakar-Hadji Akushinsky, Dargin warrior from the Caucasian War.
- Gasan Umalatov, mixed martial artist, 2008 World champion in Kick Jitsu, two-time World champion in Universal Combat (2010 & 2011) and three-time world champion in Hand-to-Hand combat.
- Hasbulla, internet personality
- Magomed-Ali Magomedov, ex-president of Dagestan.
- Magomedsalam Magomedov, ex-president of Dagestan.
- Patimat Abakarova, Olympic bronze medalist in Taekwondo.
- Magomed-Shapi Suleymanov, footballer.
- Shahbulat Shamhalaev, retired mixed martial artist and kickboxer.
- Magomedrasul Medzhidov, olympic and professional boxer.
- Ali Isaev, mixed martial artist and former amateur wrestler.
- Magomed Umalatov, mixed martial artist fighting in PFL and former GFC welterweight champion.
- Gadzhi Rabadanov, mixed martial artist, current fighting in the Lightweight division of Bellator MMA.
- Timur Khizriev, mixed martial artist, current fighting in the Featherweight division of the Professional Fighters League (PFL).
- Said Amirov, former mayor of Makhachkala
- Ruslan Magomedov, former Heavyweight mixed martial artist
- Mahammad Mirzabeyov, Russian-Azerbaijani former professional football player
- Rustam Asildarov, Islamic militant
- Amir Hamza III, khan of Kaitags who ruled Kaitag Utsmiate from 1751 to 1787
- Rashid Magomedov, mixed martial artist
