= Urkarakh =

Rural locality in Dagestan, Russia

Coordinates: 42°09′43″N 47°37′54″E

Urkarakh (Russian: Уркарах, Dargin: Уркарахъ) is a rural locality (a selo) and the administrative center of Dakhadayevsky District of the Republic of Dagestan, Russia. Population: 4,394 (2010 census); 5,182 (2002 census); 4,208 (1989 Soviet census).
