= Dakhadayevsky District =

Dakhadayevsky District Дахадаевский район (Russian)
- District

Other transcription(s)
  - Dargwa: Дахадаевла район
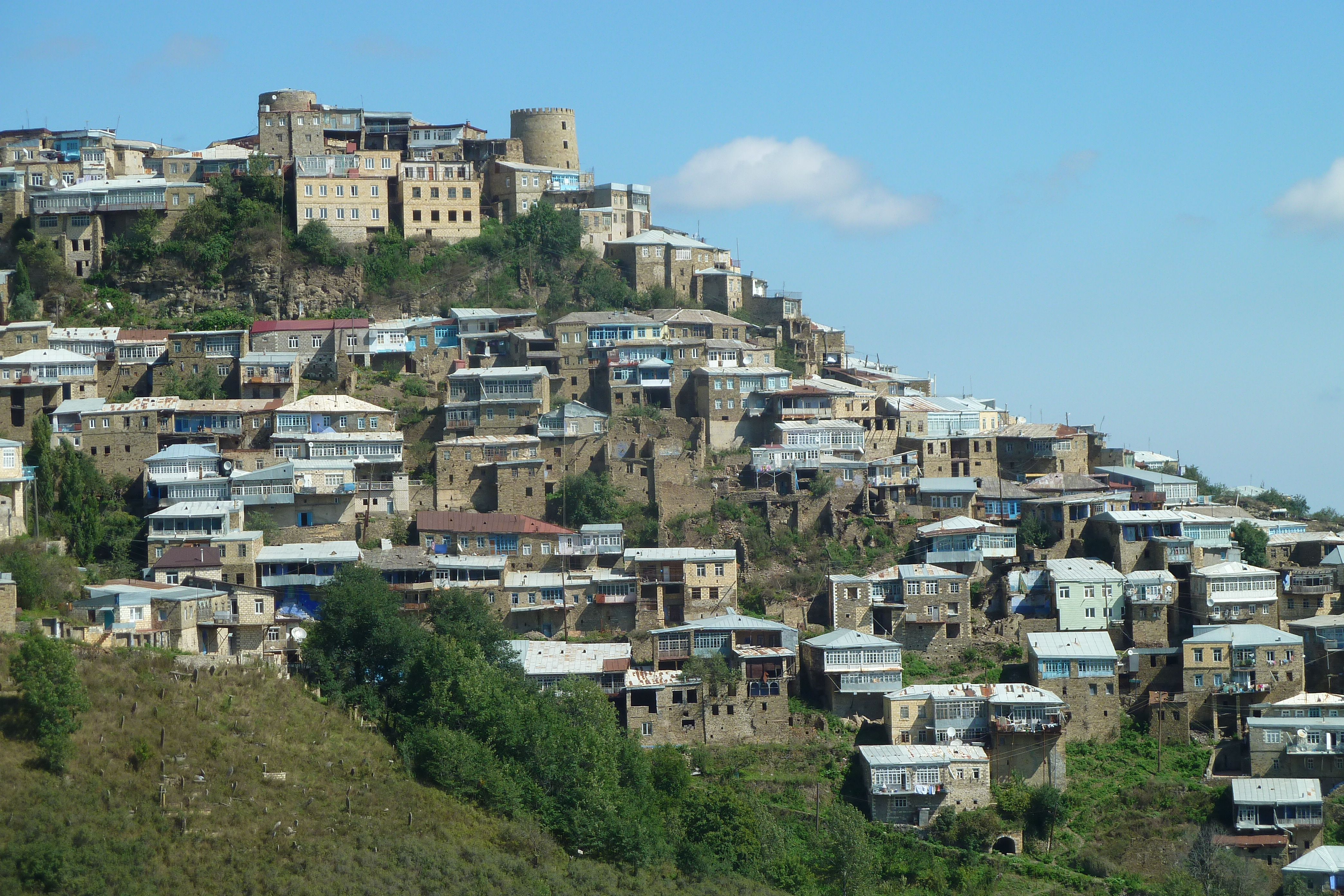
- The urban-type settlement of Kubachi in Dakhadayevsky District

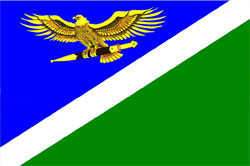
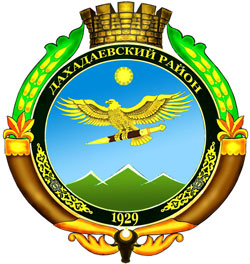
- Flag Coat of arms
- Location of Dakhadayevsky District in the Republic of Dagestan
- Coordinates: 42°10′N 47°38′E
- Country: Russia
- Federal subject: Republic of Dagestan
- Established: 1928
- Administrative center: Urkarakh

Area
  - Total: 1,450 km^{2} (560 sq mi)

Population (2010 Census)
  - Total: 36,709
  - Density: 25.3/km^{2} (65.6/sq mi)
  - Urban: 8.3%
  - Rural: 91.7%

Administrative structure
  - Administrative divisions: 1 Settlements, 15 Selsoviets
  - Inhabited localities: 1 urban-type settlements, 63 rural localities

Municipal structure
  - Municipally incorporated as: Dakhadayevsky Municipal District
  - Municipal divisions: 1 urban settlements, 25 rural settlements
- Time zone: UTC+3 (MSK)
- OKTMO ID: 82618000
- Website: http://www.urkarakh.ru

Population of Dakhadayevsky District
- 2010 Census: 36,709
- 2002 Census: 38,359
- 1989 Census: 28,076
- 1979 Census: 31,873

Dakhadayevsky District (Russian: Дахада́евский райо́н) is an administrative and municipal district (raion), one of the forty-one in the Republic of Dagestan, Russia. It is located in the southern central part of the republic. The area of the district is 1,450 square kilometers (560 sq mi). Its administrative center is the rural locality (a selo) of Urkarakh. As of the 2010 Census, the total population of the district was 36,709, with the population of Urkarakh accounting for 12.0% of that number.

== Administrative and municipal status ==
Within the framework of administrative divisions, Dakhadayevsky District is one of the forty-one in the Republic of Dagestan. It is divided into one settlement (an administrative division with the administrative center in the urban-type settlement (an inhabited locality) of Kubachi) and fifteen selsoviets, which comprise sixty-three rural localities. As a municipal division, the district is incorporated as Dakhadayevsky Municipal District. The settlement is incorporated as an urban settlement, and the fifteen selsoviets are incorporated as twenty-five rural settlements within the municipal district. The selo of Urkarakh serves as the administrative center of both the administrative and municipal district.
