= Kaitag language =

Northeast Caucasian language spoken in Dagestan, Russia

Kaitag
- Kaidak, Karakaitak, Karkaidak, Qaidaqlan, Xajdak
- хайдакьан кув
- A speaker of Kaitag.
- Pronunciation: [χɑjdɑqʼɑn kʰuβ] [χajdaq'la]
- Native to: North Caucasus
- Region: Dagestan
- Ethnicity: Kaitags
- Native speakers: approx. 30,000 (2020)
- Language family: Northeast Caucasian: Dargin; Kaitag group; Kaitag
- Dialects: Upper Kaitag; Lower Kaitag; Shari (may be a separate language)
- Writing system: Cyrillic script

Language codes
- ISO 639-3: xdq
- Glottolog: kajt1238
- Linguasphere: 42-BBB-bae
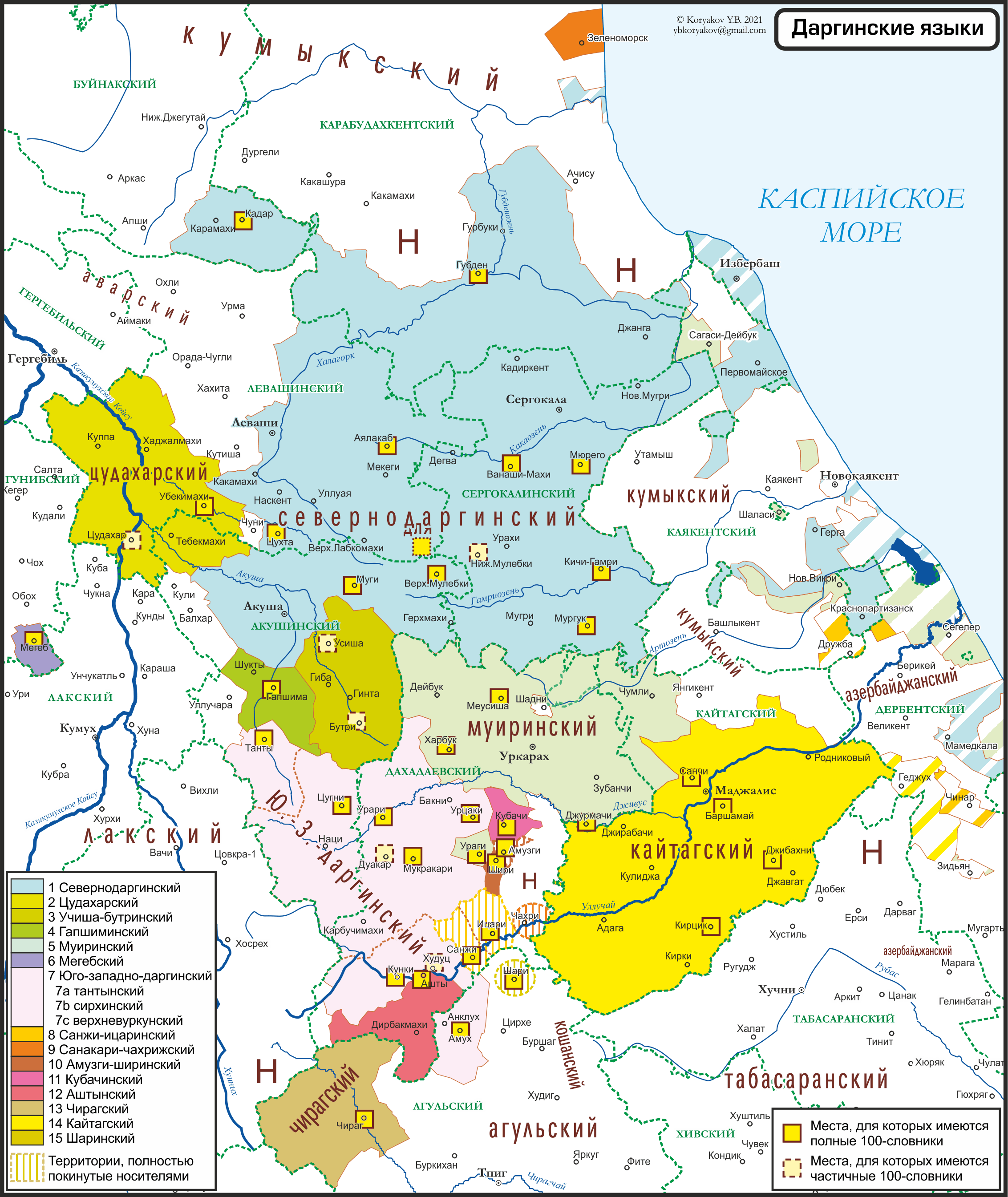
- Kaitag

Kaitag (Kaitag: Хайдакьан кув [χɑjdɑqʼɑn kʰuβ]; also Kaidak, Karakaitak, Karkaidak, Qaidaqlan and Xajdak) is a Northeast Caucasian language spoken in Dagestan, Russia. It has sometimes been considered a divergent dialect of Dargwa due to it being part of the Dargin dialect continuum. The Routledge Ethnographic Handbook (2017) divided Kaitag into two dialects: northern (Magalis-Kaitak) and southern (Karakaitak). Recent results of the Association of the Russian Sociolinguists (2021) further developed it into three dialects: Lower Kaitag, Upper Kaitag and Shari, the latter of which may be a separate but closely related language.

== Dialects ==
The languages consists of eight varieties, forming three dialects. Each of the Upper varieties corresponds to a historical province of the region.

- Upper Kaitag – Хъар Хайдакь (south-west).
  - Shurkkant – "The Cliff Dwellers" – Шурккант.
  - Qattagan – "The Gorge Dwellers" – Къаттагне.
  - Irchamul – "The Land of Nine" – ИрчӀамул.
- Lower Kaitag – Ххьар Хайдакь.
  - Barshamai – БаршамаӀъган.
  - Karatsan – ГъаӀрцӀнила.
  - Jibahni – ЧӀивгьаӀн.
  - Sanchi – Сунклан.
- Shari – ШаӀръи.

== Phonology ==
=== Vowels ===
	Front	Back
close		u
near-close	ɪ	
open-mid	ɛ	
near-open	æ	
open		ɑ

=== Consonants ===
Consonants form by series of voiced, aspirated, fortis, ejective, and labialized variants. The palatal fricative [ç] might be the voiceless post-palatal fricative, which can be more precisely transcribed as [ç̠] or [x̟].

		Bilabial	Dental	Alveolar		Palatal		Velar		Uvular		Glottal	
		Bilabial	Dental	plain	labialized	plain	labialized	plain	labialized	plain	labialized	plain	labialized
Nasal		m	n										
Plosive	voiced	b	d					g	gʷ			ʔ	
Plosive	aspirated	pʰ	tʰ					kʰ	kʷʰ	qʰ	qʷʰ	ʔ	
Plosive	fortis	pː	tː					kː	kʷː	qː	qʷː	ʔ	
Plosive	ejective	pʼ	tʼ					kʼ	kʷʼ	qʼ	qʷʼ	ʔ	
Affricate	aspirated		t͡sʰ	t͡ʃʰ	t͡ʃʷʰ								
Affricate	fortis		t͡sː	t͡ʃː	t͡ʃʷː								
Affricate	ejective		t͡sʼ	t͡ʃʼ	t͡ʃʷʼ								
Fricative	voiced	β	z	ʒ	ʒʷ					ʁ	ʁʷ		
Fricative	plain		s	ʃ	ʃʷ	ç	çʷ			χ	χʷ	h	hʷ
Fricative	fortis		sː	ʃː	ʃʷː	çː	çʷː			χː	χʷː		
Trill				r									
Approximant			l			j							

== Alphabet ==
The Kaitag language is usually written in the Cyrillic script. The letters of the alphabet are (with their pronunciation given below in IPA transcription):

а [ɑ]~[a]	аӀ [æ]	б [b]	в [β]	г [g]	гв [gʷ]	гъ [ʁ]	гъв [ʁʷ]	гь [h]	гьв [hʷ]	д [d]	е [ɛ]~[e]	ж [ʒ]	жв [ʒʷ]	з [z]	и [ɪ]~[i]	й [j]
к [kʰ]	кв [kʷʰ]	кк [kː]	ккв [kʷː]	кӀ [kʼ]	кӀв [kʷʼ]	хъ [qʰ]	хъв [qʷʰ]	къ [qː]	къв [qʷː]	кь [qʼ]	кь [qʷʼ]	л [l]	м [m]	н [n]	п [pʰ]	пп [pː]
пӀ [pʼ]	с [s]	сс [sː]	т [tʰ]	тт [tː]	тӀ [tʼ]	у [u]	х [χ]	хв [χʷ]	хх [χː]	ххв [χʷː]	хь [ç]	хьв [çʷ]	ххь [çː]	ххьв [çʷː]	ц [t͡sʰ]	цц [t͡sː]
цӀ [t͡sʼ]	ч [t͡ʃʰ]	чв [t͡ʃʷʰ]	чч [t͡ʃː]	ччв [t͡ʃʷː]	чӀ [t͡ʃʼ]	чӀв [t͡ʃʷʼ]	ш [ʃ]	шв [ʃʷ]	шш [ʃː]	шшв [ʃʷː]	ъ [ʔ]					

== Lexicon ==
Most of Kaitag's vocabulary stems from proto-Northeast-Caucasian roots. Like with other languages of Dagestan, there is a considerable number of Arabic, Iranian, Turkic and recently Russian loanwords.

Swadesh list for Kaitag
No.	English	Kaitag
1	I	ду [du]
2	you (singular)	и [(ʔ)ɪ]
3	he	гье [hɛ]
4	we	нисса [nisːɑ] (excl.), ниххьва [niçʷːɑ] (incl.)
5	you (plural)	нишша [niʃːɑ]
6	they	гьетти [hetːɪ]
7	this	гьеж [hɛʒ]
8	that	гьет [hɛtʰ]
9	here	гьежин [hɛʒɪn]
10	there	гьетин [hɛtʰɪn]
11	who	ча [t͡ʃʰɑ]
12	what	ци [t͡sʰɪ]
13	where	квацци [kʷʰɑt͡sːɪ]
14	when	цикъел [t͡sʰɪqːɛl]
15	how	цигле [t͡sʰɪglɛ]
16	not	аккву [ɑkʷːu] (n.), а(й)- [ɑ(j)-] (v.)
17	all	сукке [sukːɛ]
18	many	дахъ [dɑqʰ]
19	some	чумилра [t͡ʃʰumɪlrɑ]
20	few	кам [kʰɑm]
21	other	дикӀар [dɪkʼɑr]
22	one	ца [t͡sʰɑ]
23	two	чӀве [t͡ʃʷʼɛ]
24	three	аӀв [æβ]
25	four	угъ [uʁ]
26	five	шве [ʃʷɛ]
27	big	хвала [χʷɑlɑ]
28	long	ухъен [uqʰɛn]
29	wide	баӀъу [bæʔu]
30	thick	буцц [but͡sː]
31	heavy	декӀ [dɛkʼ]
32	small	никӀва [nɪkʷʼɑ]
33	short	кутӀ [kutʼ]
34	narrow	гъваӀрцӀ [ʁʷærcʼ]
35	thin	букӀал [bukʼɑl]
36	woman	ххьулум [çːulum]
37	man (adult male)	мургул [murgul]
38	man (human being)	мейдам [mɛjdɑm]
39	child	даӀргьаӀ [dærhæ]
40	wife	ххьади [çːɑdɪ]
41	husband	сув [suβ]
42	mother	уба [ubɑ]
43	father	атта [ɑtːɑ]
44	animal	мицӀираг [mɪcʼɪrɑg]
45	fish	кӀас [kʼɑs]
46	bird	ахьлиъаӀн [ɑçlɪʔæn]
47	dog	ххваӀ [χʷːæ]
48	louse	нез [nɛz]
49	snake	цӀецӀи [cʼɛcʼɪ]
50	worm	милкъваӀ [mɪlqʷːæ]
51	tree	ккалкка [kːɑlkːɑ]
52	forest	дуцца [dut͡sːɑ]
53	stick	миргъаӀ [mɪrʁæ]
54	fruit	удар [udɑr]
55	seed	шва [ʃʷɑ]
56	leaf	кӀаппар [kʼɑpːɑr]
57	root	йамппа [jɑmpːɑ]
58	bark (of a tree)	кам [kɑm]
59	flower	жуже [ʒuʒɛ]
60	grass	кьар [qʼɑr]
