= Madzhalis =

Rural locality in Dagestan, Russia

Madzhalis Маджалис Мажалис
- Village
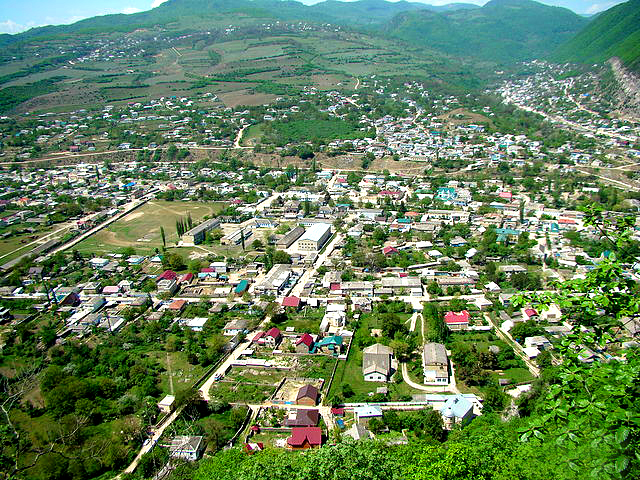

- Location within Republic of Dagestan Location within Russia
- Coordinates: 42°07′20″N 47°50′01″E
- Country: Russia
- Region: Republic of Dagestan
- District: Kaytagsky District
- Elevation: 408 m (1,339 ft)

Population (2021)
  - Total: 6,659 people
- Time zone: UTC+3:00
- Postal code: 368590

Madzhalis (Russian: Маджалис; Dargwa: Мажалис) is a rural locality (a selo) and the administrative center of Kaytagsky District of the Republic of Dagestan, Russia. Population: 6,815 (2010 census); 5,766 (2002 census); 5,211 (1989 Soviet census). During the Russian Empire, the settlement was the administrative capital of the Kaytago-Tabasaransky Okrug.

== History ==
Located on the Boghan river, Madzhalis (also spelled Majālis) was historically one of the capitals of the Qaytaq people. It was founded by the utsmi Sultan-Ahmad (who died in 1588); previously, it had been a place where people had gathered for tribal meetings. It was later succeeded as Qaytaq capital by Bashli sometime in the 18th century.

== Population ==
=== National composition ===
According to data from 1869, out of 287 households in the Madzhalis, 169 spoke Kumyk, 118 spoke Kaitag. According to family lists of 1886, Dargins made up 60% of the population, the remaining 40 were Mountain Jews. According to the list of populated areas of the Dagestan region in 1888, only "Tatars" are indicated in the nationality column, which meant Kumyks, who made up the majority, and Jews.

The Scottish baron and traveler John Abercromby wrote in 1889 that Madzhalis, except for its Jewish element (quarter), was inhabited by "Tatars". The scientist-historian Evgeny Kozubsky in 1895 indicated that the main nationality of the Madzhalis was the Dargins, and the main language was Kumyk, which was somewhat different from the language of the northern Kumykia.

Russian anthropologist Pavel Svidersky noted in 1901 that Madzhalis consists of two villages: Dargins and Mountain Jewish, as well as several houses of Russian administration workers.

In the 1940s, part of the Dargins from the village of Abdashka was resettled to the village, who formed a separate quarter in the village. In 1968, residents of the burnt village of Darsha were resettled to Madzhalis.

=== Jewish Quarter ===
Mountain Jews lived in the Tuben-Aul ("Lower Aul") quarter, where they moved in the 19th century after a pogrom in three Jewish villages located nearby.

Local Jews, in addition to their native language, also knew the Dargin and Kumyk languages. Jews were engaged in agriculture, in particular leather production and viticulture and winemaking. In 1867, there were 80 Jews families in Madzhalis. In 1926 there were 69 of them. In the 1930s, the synagogue in the village was demolished. At the same time, a Jewish collective farm was established, which was later merged with the Dargin one. After the war, most of the Mountain Jews left for Derbent, Buynaksk and Makhachkala. In 1994, there were only 7 Jewish families in the village.

== Economy ==
Deposits of phosphorites, clays and loams; iodine-bromine and boron mineral waters.

== Culture ==
- Museum of Local Lore.
- Weather station.
- Mounds (15 km east of Mount Hokuz-Danna - 6); settlement (14 km east of the village - Gyaur-Tepe, Samanlyk-Tepe, Khazka-Tepe).

== Archaeological excavations ==
A burial ground dating back to the first millennium BC was found 50 meters south of the Madzhalis second settlement. One of the graves was an oval pit with two bones flexed on the left side, oriented to the south, accompanied by 21 bronze hemispherical plaques, a bronze cap, piercings, an iron socketed spearhead, 8 bone arrowheads, a temple decoration, and a jar vessel.

Near the village, a bronze dagger of the Western Asian type, dating from the twelfth-tenth centuries BC, was also found.

Tombstones with Arabic inscriptions were discovered in the village. Some of them date back to the fourteenth-fifteenth centuries. There are also monuments dating from the fourteenth-sixteenth centuries.

== Sources ==
- Народное Собрание Республики Дагестан. Закон №16 от 10 апреля 2002 г. «Об административно-территориальном устройстве Республики Дагестан», в ред. Закона №106 от 30 декабря 2013 г. «О внесении изменений в некоторые законодательные акты Республики Дагестан». Вступил в силу со дня официального опубликования. Опубликован: "Дагестанская правда", №81, 12 апреля 2002 г. (People's Assembly of the Republic of Dagestan. Law #16 of April 10, 2002 On the Administrative-Territorial Structure of the Republic of Dagestan, as amended by the Law #106 of December 30, 2013 On Amending Various Legislative Acts of the Republic of Dagestan. Effective as of the day of the official publication.).
- Народное Собрание Республики Дагестан. Закон №6 от 13 января 2005 г. «О статусе и границах муниципальных образований Республики Дагестан», в ред. Закона №43 от 30 апреля 2015 г. «О статусе городского округа с внутригородским делением "Город Махачкала", статусе и границах внутригородских районов в составе городского округа с внутригородским делением "Город Махачкала" и о внесении изменений в отдельные законодательные акты Республики Дагестан». Вступил в силу со дня официального опубликования. Опубликован: "Дагестанская правда", №8, 15 февраля 2005 г. (People's Assembly of the Republic of Dagestan. Law #6 of January 13, 2005 On the Status and Borders of the Municipal Formations of the Republic of Dagestan, as amended by the Law #43 of April 30, 2015 On the Status of the "City of Makhachkala" Urban Okrug with Intra-Urban Divisions, the Status and the Borders of the Intra-City Districts Comprising the "City of Makhachkala" Urban Okrug with Intra-Urban Divisions, and on Amending Various Legislative Acts of the Republic of Dagestan. Effective as of the day of the official publication.).
