= Kaytagsky District =

Kaytagsky District Кайтагский район (Russian)
- District

Other transcription(s)
  - Kaitag: Хайдакьан ххаӏр
  - Dargwa: Хайдакъла райун
  - Kumyk: Хайдакълы якъ
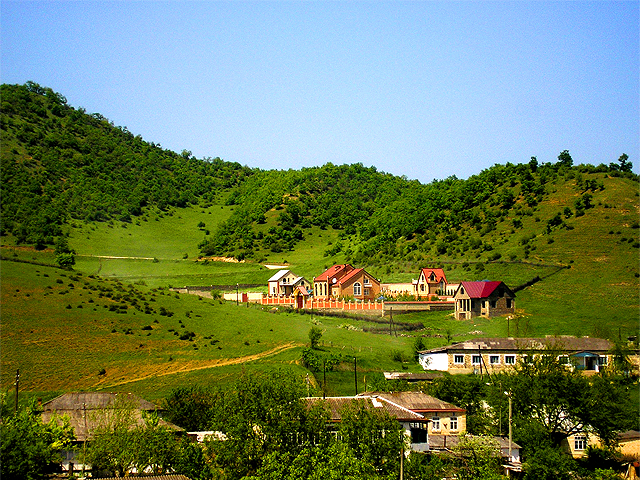
- Landscape in Kaytagsky District

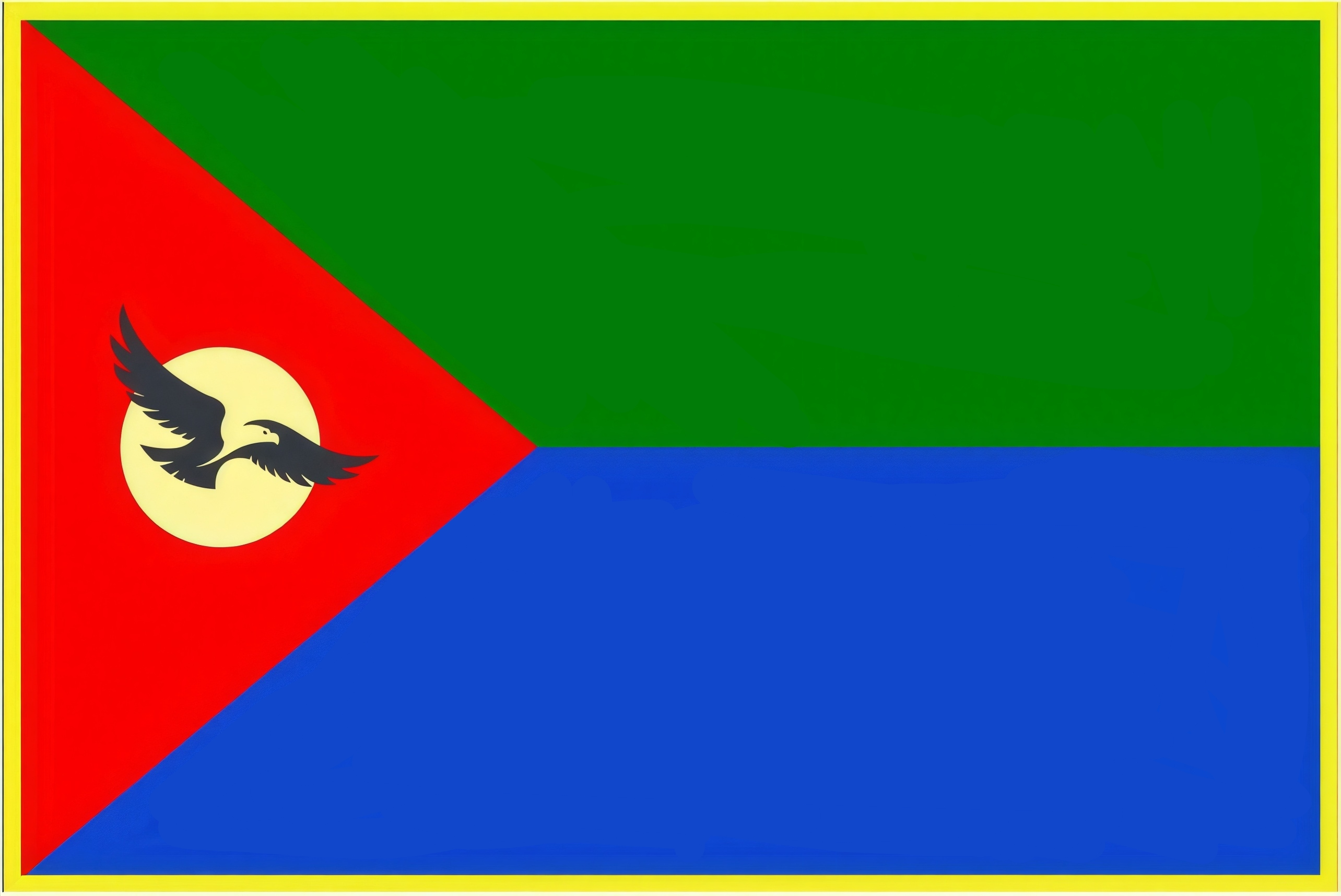
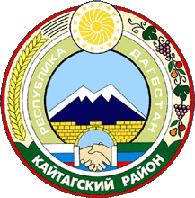
- Flag Coat of arms
- Location of Kaytagsky District in the Republic of Dagestan
- Coordinates: 42°07′N 47°50′E
- Country: Russia
- Federal subject: Republic of Dagestan
- Established: 1929
- Administrative center: Madzhalis

Area
  - Total: 678.24 km^{2} (261.87 sq mi)

Population (2010 Census)
  - Total: 31,368
  - Density: 46.249/km^{2} (119.78/sq mi)
  - Urban: 0%
  - Rural: 100%

Administrative structure
  - Administrative divisions: 12 Selsoviets
  - Inhabited localities: 45 rural localities

Municipal structure
  - Municipally incorporated as: Kaytagsky Municipal District
  - Municipal divisions: 0 urban settlements, 16 rural settlements
- Time zone: UTC+3 (MSK)
- OKTMO ID: 82623000
- Website: http://kaytagrayon.e-dag.ru

Population of Kaytagsky District
- 2010 Census: 31,368
- 2002 Census: 26,870
- 1989 Census: 23,145
- 1979 Census: 23,149

Kaytagsky District (Russian: Кайта́гский райо́н; Dargwa: Хайдакъла райун; Kumyk: Хайдакълы якъ, Xaydaqlı yaq) is an administrative and municipal district (raion), one of the forty-one in the Republic of Dagestan, Russia. It is located in the southeast of the republic. The area of the district is 678.24 square kilometers (261.87 sq mi). Its administrative center is the rural locality (a selo) of Madzhalis. As of the 2010 Census, the total population of the district was 31,368, with the population of Madzhalis accounting for 21.7% of that number.

== Administrative and municipal status ==
Within the framework of administrative divisions, Kaytagsky District is one of the forty-one in the Republic of Dagestan. The district is divided into twelve selsoviets which comprise forty-five rural localities. As a municipal division, the district is incorporated as Kaytagsky Municipal District. Its twelve selsoviets are incorporated as sixteen rural settlements within the municipal district. The selo of Madzhalis serves as the administrative center of both the administrative and municipal district.

== Former state ==
Around 1800, Kaitag or Karakaitag was a small ethnically Dargin state. Its chief town was Bashli (probably Bashlykent) and its ruler was called the Utsmi.

== See also ==
- Kaitag textiles
- Kaitak language
