= Persian pottery =

Pottery of Iran

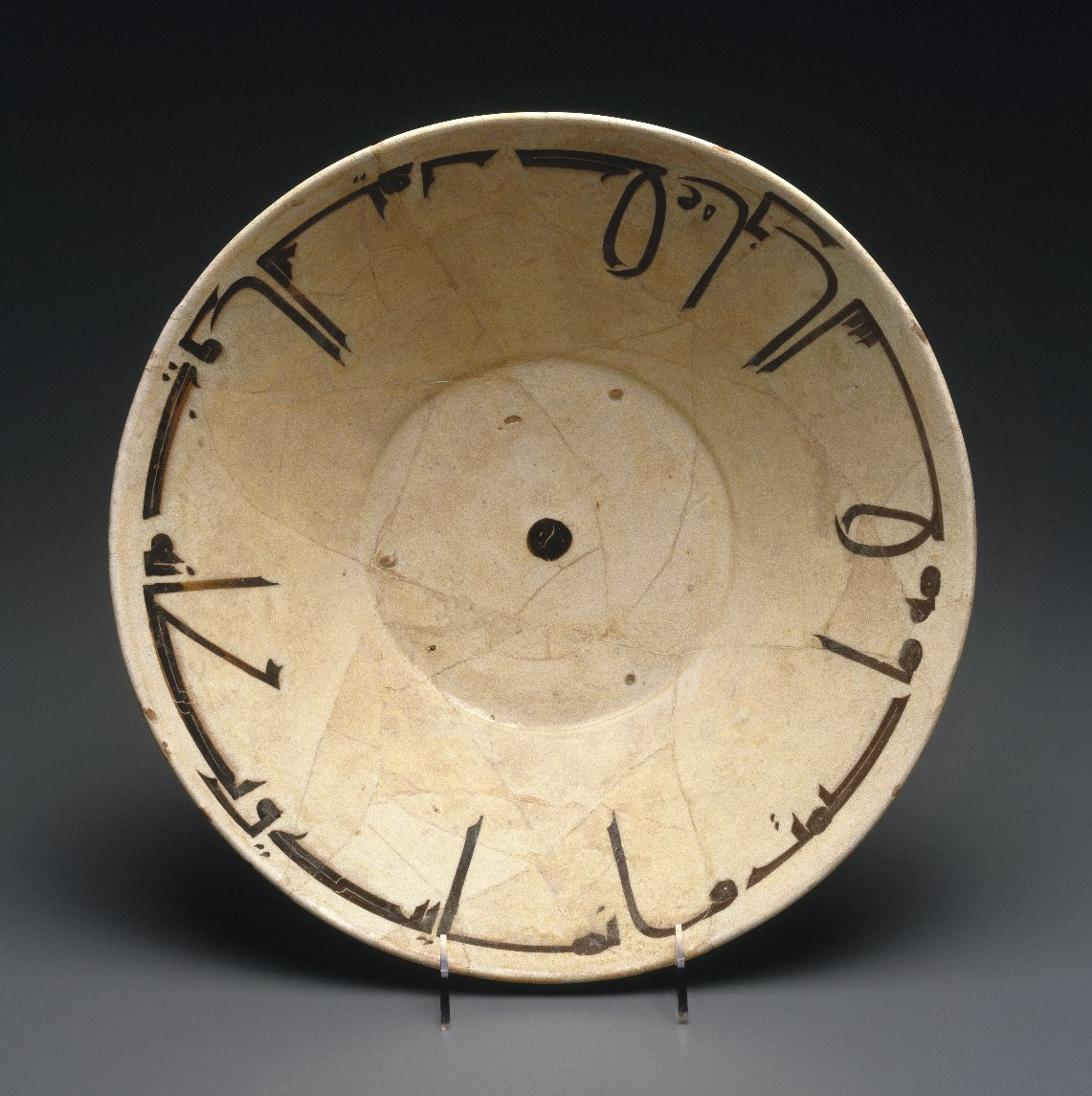
Bowl with Kufic Inscription, 10th century. Brooklyn Museum.

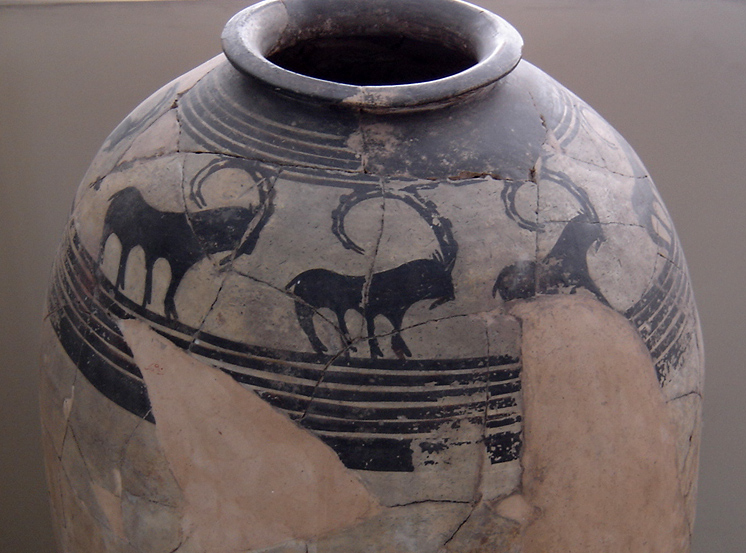
Pottery Vessel, 4th millennium BC

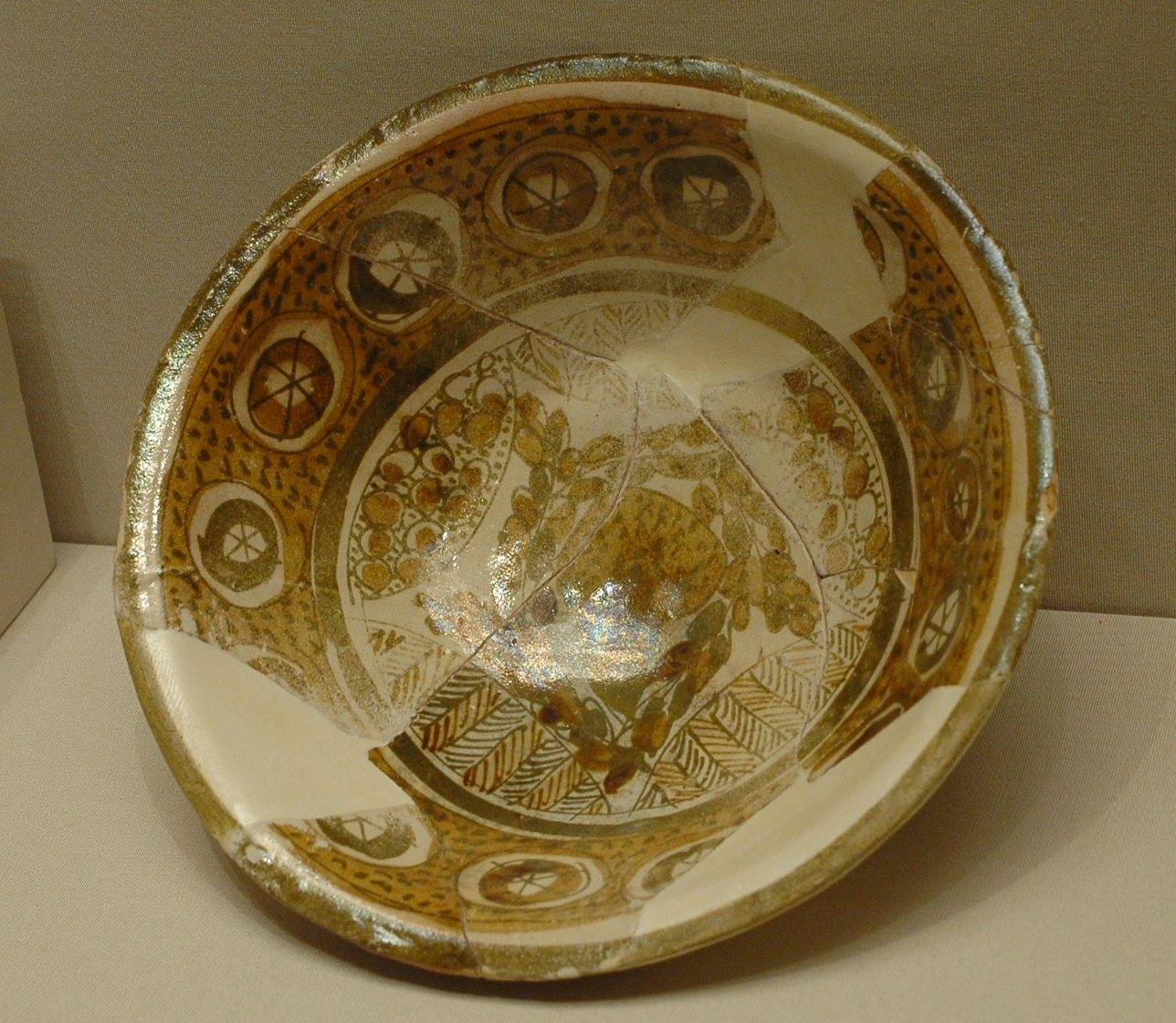
Lustreware bowl from Susa, 9th century

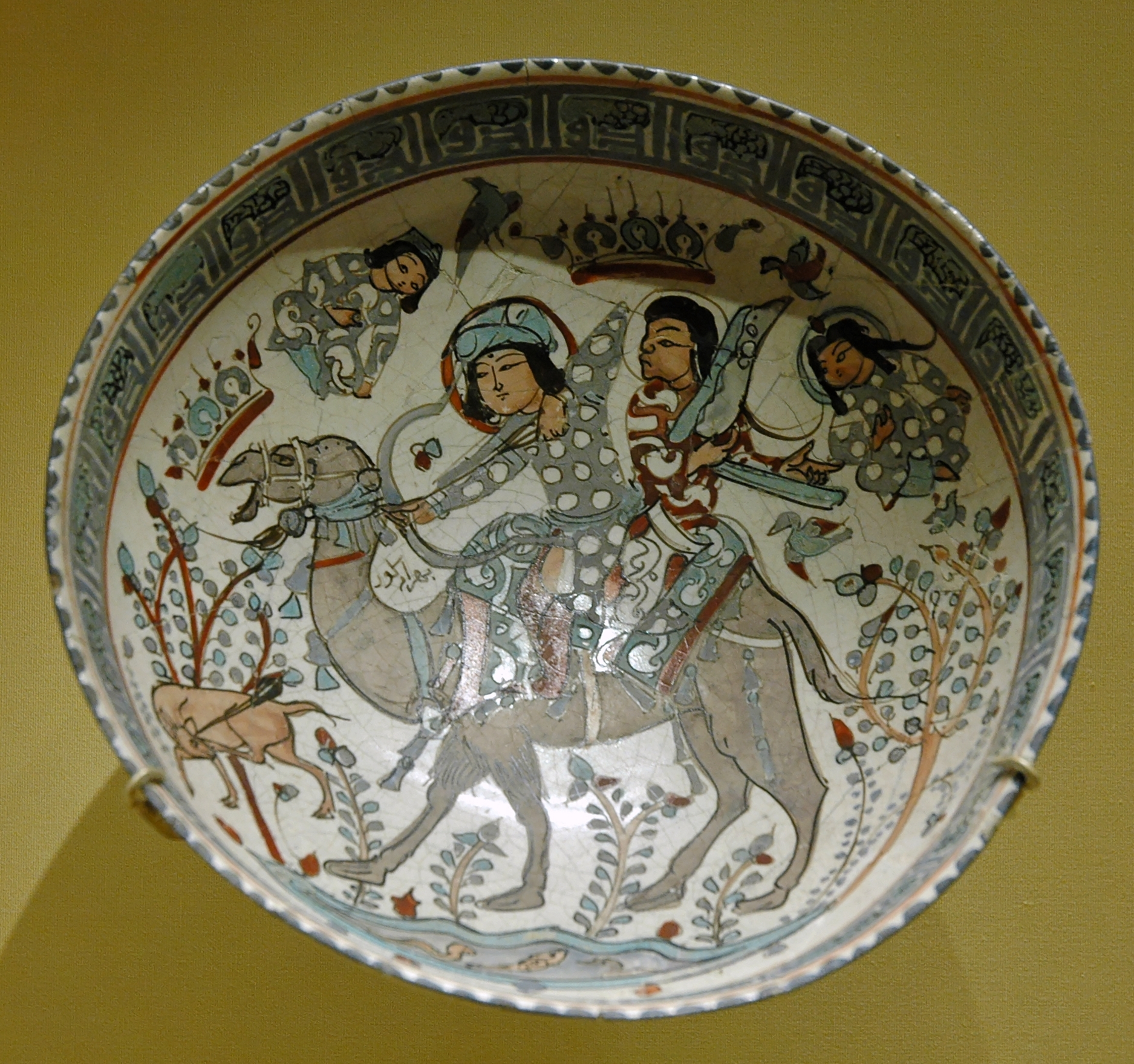
Bowl with a hunting scene from the tale of the 5th-century king Bahram Gur and Azadeh, mina'i ware

Persian pottery or Iranian pottery is the pottery made by the artists of Persia (Iran) and its history goes back to early Neolithic Age (7th millennium BCE). Agriculture gave rise to the baking of clay, and the making of utensils by the people of Iran. Through the centuries, Persian potters have responded to the demands and changes brought by political turmoil by adopting and refining newly introduced forms and blending them into their own culture. This innovative attitude has survived through time and influenced many other cultures around the world.

There were two types of earthenware that were prevalent in Iran around 4,000 BC: red and black ceramics that were simplistic in their decorative style. As the art expanded, earthenware incorporated geometric designs which resulted in a more developed decorative style. This increasingly complex style was accompanied by the creation of a wider variety of the kinds of pottery that were made.

In the prehistoric period, the production of vessels included the mixture of clay, small pieces of various plants and straws, and water. When these ingredients were mixed together, they formed a very hard paste which essentially became the paste used for the base for creating all vessels in Iran. The creation of Vessels differed in the shape because they were made by hand. Around the 4th millennium BCE, the quality of vessel production enhanced because the potter's wheel was introduced. This table was used to produce symmetrically shaped, and better quality vessels.

The Islamic prohibition on using vessels made of precious metal at the table meant that a new market for luxury ceramics opened up. This allowed the pre-Islamic elites of the earlier Persian empires to produce fancy glazes such as lustreware and high-quality painted decoration. Overall, Persian pottery expanded in their use of tools and styles to improve art production.

== Early pottery from Susa ==
Susa was firmly within the Sumerian Uruk cultural sphere during the Uruk period. An imitation of the entire state apparatus of Uruk, proto-writing, cylinder seals with Sumerian motifs, and monumental architecture, is found at Susa. Susa may have been a colony of Uruk. As such, the periodization of Susa corresponds to Uruk; Early, Middle and Late Susa II periods (3800–3100 BCE) correspond to Early, Middle, and Late Uruk periods.

Shortly after Susa was first settled 6000 years ago, its inhabitants erected a temple on a monumental platform that rose over the flat surrounding landscape. The exceptional nature of the site is still recognizable today in the artistry of the ceramic vessels that were placed as offerings in a thousand or more graves near the base of the temple platform. Nearly two thousand pots were recovered from the cemetery and now, most of them are located in the Louvre; one such vessel is the Bushel with ibex motifs. The vessels found are eloquent testimony to the artistic and technical achievements of their makers, and they hold clues about the organization of the society that commissioned them. Painted ceramic vessels from Susa in the earliest first style are a late, regional version of the Mesopotamian Ubaid ceramic tradition that spread across the Near East during the fifth millennium B.C.

Susa I style was very much a product of the past and of influences from contemporary ceramic industries in the mountains of western Iran. The recurrence in close association of vessels of three types—a drinking goblet or beaker, a serving dish, and a small jar—implies the consumption of three types of food, apparently thought to be as necessary for life in the after world as it is in this one. Ceramics of these shapes, which were painted, constitute a large proportion of the vessels from the cemetery. Others are course cooking-type jars and bowls with simple bands painted on them and were probably the grave goods of the sites of humbler citizens as well as adolescents and, perhaps, children. The pottery is carefully made by hand. Although a slow wheel may have been employed, the asymmetry of the vessels and the irregularity of the drawing of encircling lines and bands indicate that most of the work was done freehand.

== Early Islamic period ==
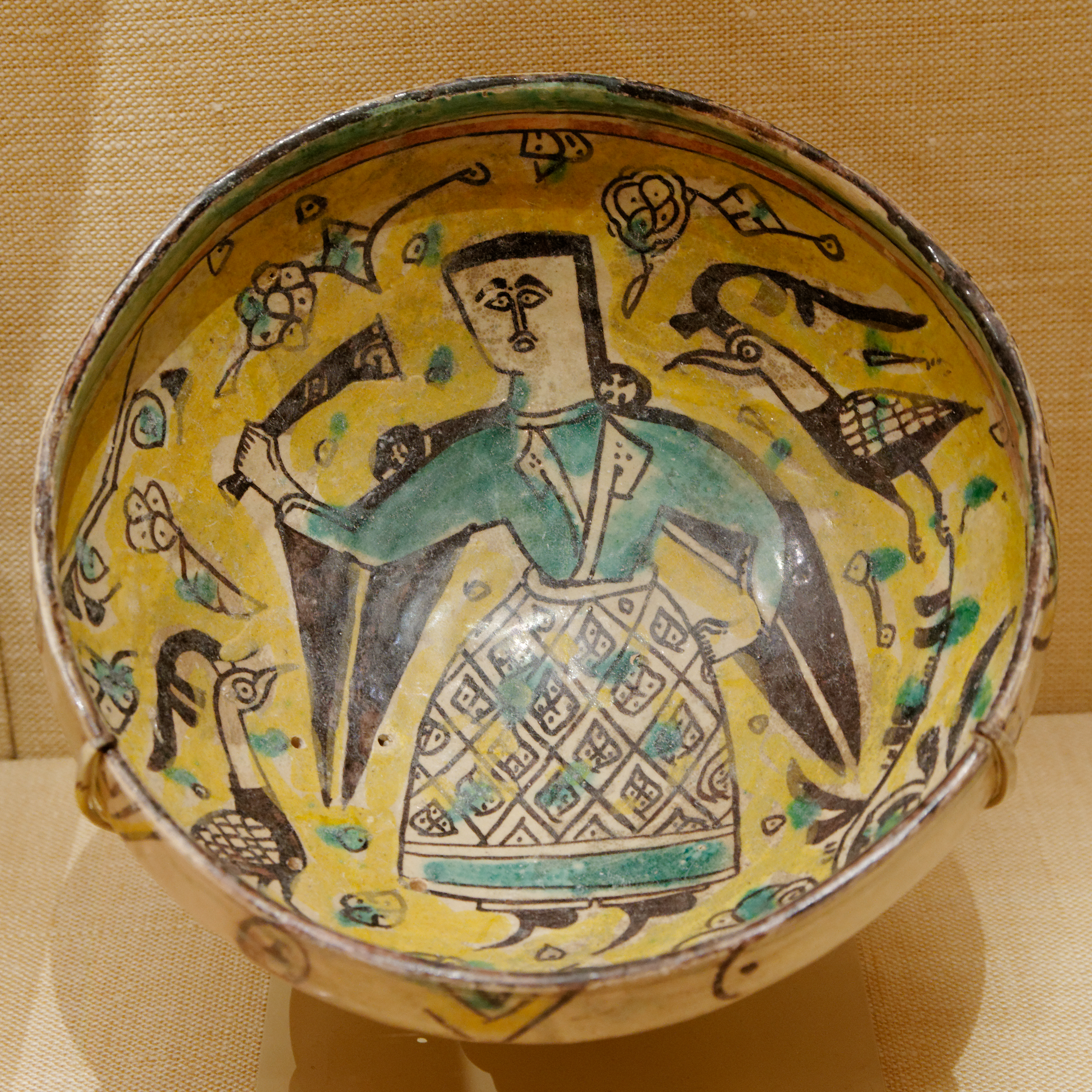
Buff ware Bowl, Nishapur 10th century

The Samanid period saw the creation of epigraphic pottery. These pieces were typically earthenware vessels with black slip lettering in Kufic script painted on a base of white slip. These vessels would typically be inscribed with benedictions or adages. Samarqand and Nishapur were both centers of production for this kind of pottery.

Nishapur is a city located in North-east Iran, and was founded by the Sasanian ruler Shapur I around 241–272 AD. This city fell under the rule of Islam around 651 and essentially became a city of flourishing arts and crafts. Some of the art produced was earthenware, glass, metalwork, coins, decorative walls, and carved and painted stucco (Wilkinson, 26). The production of earthenware vessels, ceramics, and other forms of art were being exported around their neighboring villages. This kept their political power on the rise because they were able to dictate the areas where their art could be imported. Ceramics was one of the art that was imported and unique to the neighboring cities of Nishapur. One of the most common group of ceramic was called buff ware. The buff ware are characterized by images with purple and black outline painted on to the vessel. The buff ware also included the mixture of yellow and green glazes.

== Seljuk period ==
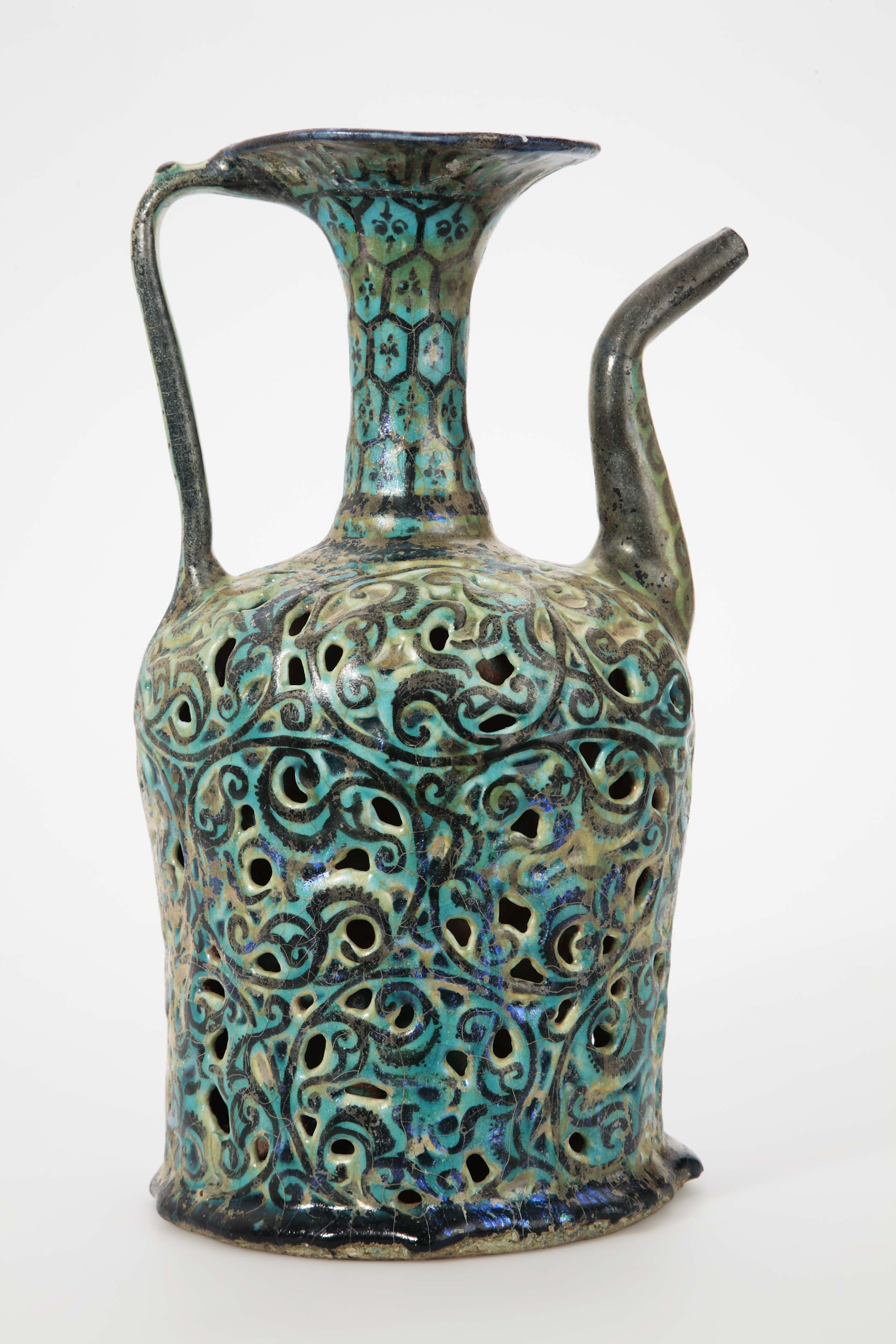
Double-shelled ewer made in early 13th-century Kashan, Khalili Collection of Islamic Art

Seljuk pottery, produced when Iran was part of the Seljuk Empire, is often considered the finest period of Persian pottery, and was certainly the most innovative. Kashan was the main, perhaps the only centre of production for the three main types of fine wares, lustreware, underglaze painted ware and polychrome overglaze painted mina'i ware. All used a new fritware (or "stonepaste") body developed in Persia under the Seljuks. This took a new white glaze very well, and allowed thinner walls with some of the translucency of Chinese porcelain; this was already imported into Persia, and represented the main competition for local fine wares. This "white ware" body was used for a variety of styles of decoration, all showing great advances in sophistication.

This golden age largely came to an end with the Mongol invasion of Persia starting in 1219. Kashan itself was not sacked or destroyed, but the Seljuk elite who were the customers for its wares were almost wholly destroyed. It took some decades before the new Mongol masters developed a taste for fine pottery.

=== Mina'i ware ===
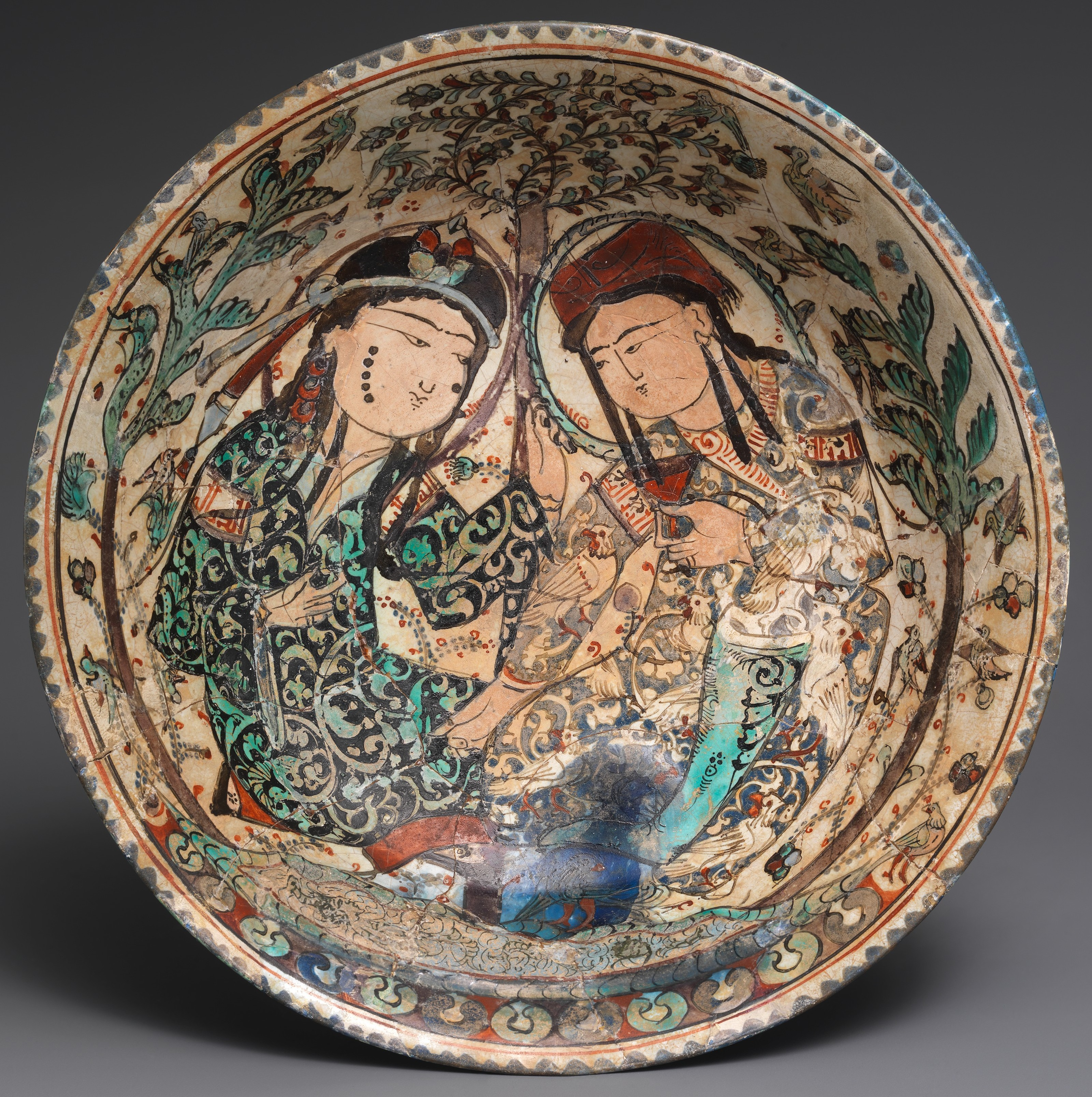
Mina'i ware bowl with couple in a garden, around 1200. In this type of scene, the figures are rather larger than in other common subjects. Diameter 18.8 cm.

Innovations in Seljuk pottery include the production of mina'i ware (meaning "enamelled ware"), developed in Kashan in the decades leading up to the Mongol invasion of Persia in 1219, after which production ceased. It has been described as "probably the most luxurious of all types of ceramic ware produced in the eastern Islamic lands during the medieval period". The ceramic body of white-ish fritware or stonepaste is fully decorated with detailed paintings using several colours, usually including figures.

It is significant as the first pottery to use overglaze enamels, painted over the ceramic glaze fixed by a main glost firing; after painting the wares were given a second firing at a lower temperature. "Mina'i", a term only used for these wares much later, means "enamelled" in the Persian language. This technique much later became the standard method of decorating the best European and Chinese porcelain, though it is not clear that there was a connection between this and the earlier Persian use of the technique. As in other periods and regions when overglaze enamels were used, the purpose of the technique was to expand the range of colours available to painters beyond the very limited group that could withstand the temperature required for the main firing of the body and glaze, which in the case of these wares was about 950 °C. The period also introduced underglaze decoration to Persian pottery, around 1200, and later mina'i pieces often combine both underglaze and overglaze decoration; the former may also be described as inglaze.

Most pieces are dated imprecisely as, for example, "late 12th or early 13th century", but the few inscribed dates begin in the 1170s and end in 1219. Gilded pieces are often dated to around or after 1200. It is assumed that the style and subjects in the painting of mina'i ware were drawn from contemporary Persian manuscript painting and wall painting. It is known these existed, but no illustrated manuscripts or murals from the period before the Mongol conquest have survived, leaving the painting on the pottery as the best evidence of that style.

Most pieces are bowls, cups, and a range of pouring vessels: ewers, jars, and jugs, only a handful very large. There are some pieces considered to be begging bowls, or using the shape associated with that function. Tiles are rare, and were perhaps designed as centrepieces surrounded by other materials, rather than placed in groups. Mina'i tiles found in situ by archaeologists at Konya in modern Turkey were probably made there by itinerant Persian artists. Sherds of mina'i ware have been excavated from "most urban sites in Iran and Central Asia" occupied during the period, although most writers believe that nearly all production was in Kashan.

One of the most famous examples of the mina'i ware technique is the large bowl now at the Freer Gallery in Washington DC. This image depicts a battle that occurred between the Turkish emirs in the Northwest regions of Iran. The front of the plate depicts a siege of the castle, and the back portrayed hunting. This plate is one of the largest haft in existence. It incorporates inscriptions used to identify the protagonist of the story. The landscapes and architectural elements used in the Freer Gallery's Siege Scene plate makes the art unique. The overall story of the plate reveals the victory for the besiegers and defeat for the besieged.

One potter, Abū Zayd ibn Muḥammad ibn Abī Zayd (active c. 1186 – 1219, Kashan) has signed 15 surviving pieces, in both mina'i and lustreware, more than any other medieval Iranian potter.

== Safavid period ==
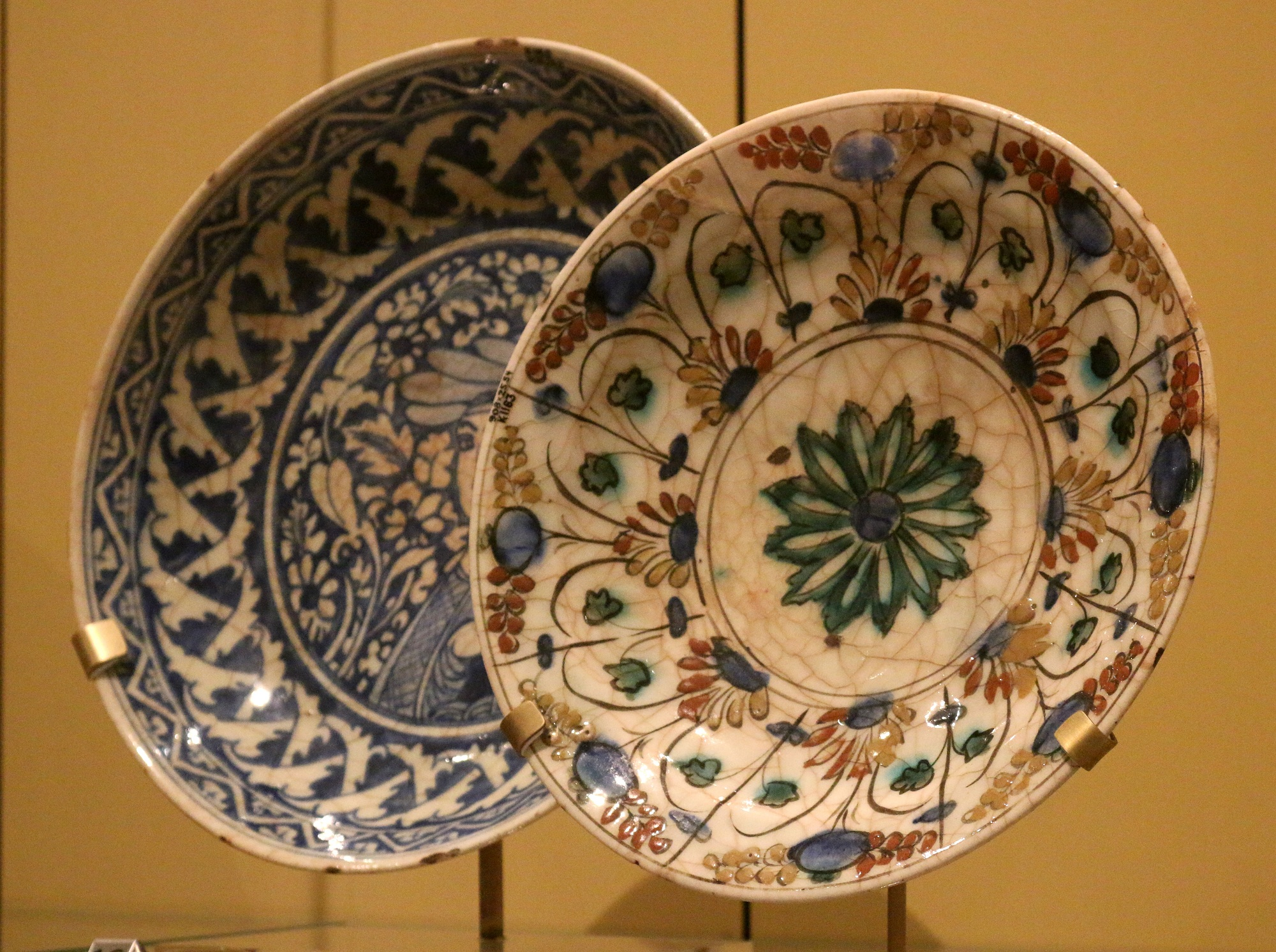
Persian Pottery from Isfahan, 17th century.

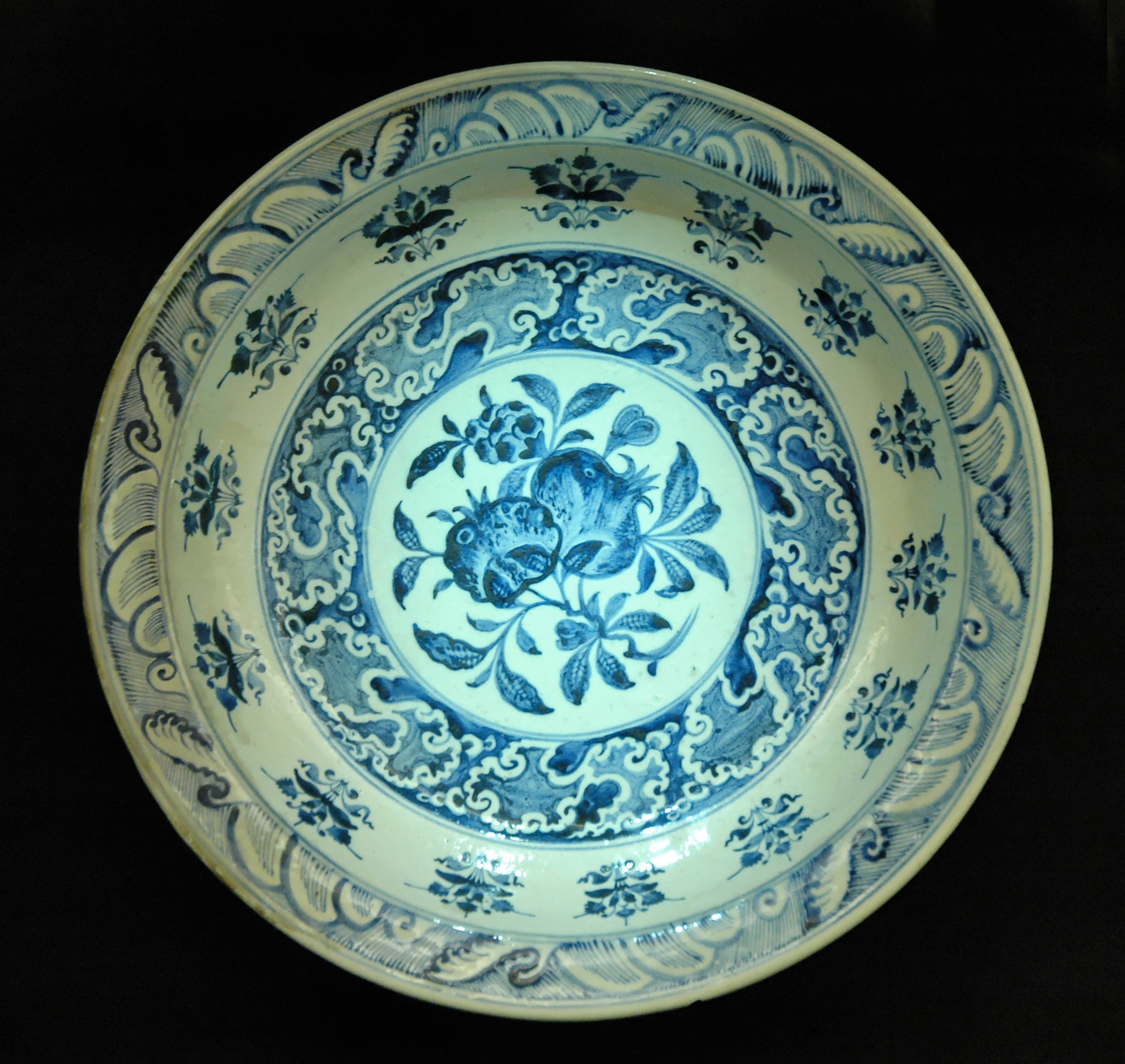
Plate decorated with two pomegranates, v. 1500, the Louvre

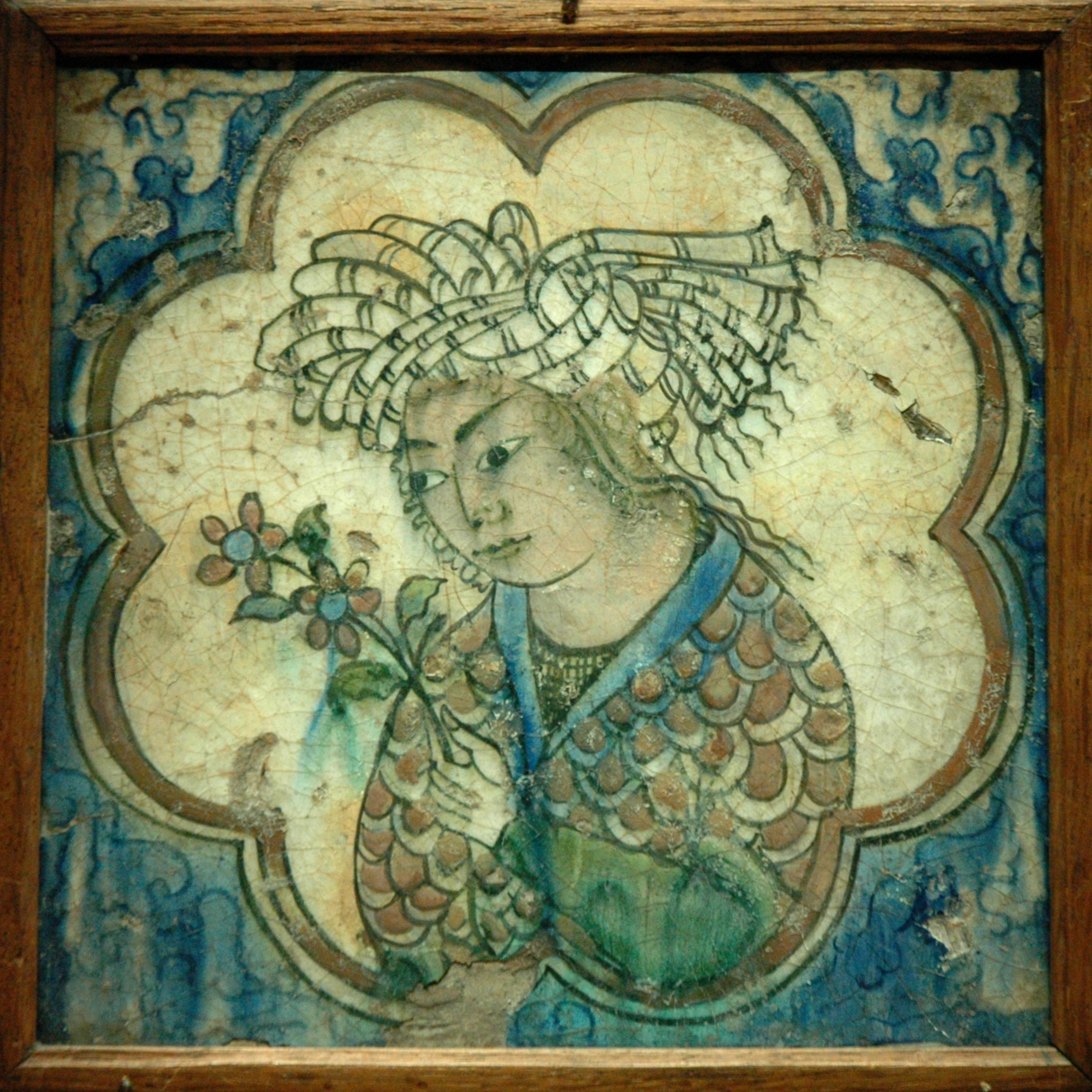
Tile with young man. Earthenware, painted on slip and under transparent glaze. Northwestern Iran, Kubachi ware, 17th century.

The study and dating of ceramics under Shah Ismail and Shah Tahmasp is difficult because there are few pieces which are dated or which mention the place of production. Chinese porcelain was collected by the elite, and was more highly valued than the local productions; Shah Abbas I donated much of the royal collection to the shrines at Ardabil and Mashhad, renovating a room at Ardabil to display pieces in niches. Many locations of workshops have been identified, although not with certainty, in particular: Nishapur, Kubachi ware, Kerman (moulded monochromatic pieces) and Mashhad. Lusterware was revived, using a different technique from the earlier production, and typically making small pieces with a design in a dark copper colour over a dark blue background. Unlike other wares, these use traditional Middle Eastern shapes and decoration rather than Chinese-inspired ones.

In general, the designs tend to imitate those of Chinese porcelain, with the production of blue and white pieces with Chinese form and motifs, with motifs such as chi clouds, and dragons. The Persian blue is distinguished from the Chinese blue by its more numerous and subtle nuances. Often, quatrains by Persian poets, sometimes related to the destination of the piece (allusion to wine for a goblet, for example) occur in the scroll patterns. A completely different type of design, much more rare, carries iconography very specific to Islam (Islamic zodiac, bud scales, arabesques) and seems influenced by the Ottoman world, as is evidenced by feather-edged anthemions (honeysuckle ornaments) widely used in Turkey. New styles of figures appeared, influenced by the art of the book: young, elegant cupbearers, young women with curved silhouettes, or yet cypress trees entangling their branches, reminiscent of the paintings of Reza Abbasi.

Numerous types of pieces were produced: goblets, plates, long-necked bottles, spittoons, etc. A common shape is flasks with very small necks and bodies flattened on one side and very rounded on the other. Shapes borrowed from Islamic metalwork with decoration largely inspired by Chinese porcelain are characteristic. With the closing of the Chinese market in 1659, Persian ceramic soared to new heights, to fulfill European needs. The appearance of false marks of Chinese workshops on the backs of some ceramics marked the taste that developed in Europe for far-eastern porcelain, satisfied in large part by Safavid production. This new destination led to wider use of Chinese and exotic iconography (elephants) and the introduction of new forms, sometimes astonishing (hookahs, octagonal plates, animal-shaped objects).

Gombroon ware was an 18th-century type of delicate pierced ware, looking rather like glass, often with inscriptions.

== Contemporary ==
Kalpuregan village in south-east Iran maintains a traditional pottery tradition. Unusually, the potting is performed by women, though men dig, refine and fire the clay. The pottery wheel is not used. Painted decoration is abstract symbols and patterns.

== Collections ==
There are large collections of Persian pottery at the British Museum, the Hermitage Museum, the Royal Ontario Museum, and elsewhere. In 2013, the Royal Ontario Museum, in partnership with Brill Publishers in the Netherlands, published a special book about this art entitled "Persian Pottery in the First Global Age".

== See also ==
- Islamic pottery
- Garrus ware
- Kubachi ware
