= Kubachi =

Kubachi may refer to:

- Kubachi language, a language spoken in the Republic of Dagestan, Russia
- Kubachi (urban-type settlement), an urban locality (an urban-type settlement) in the Republic of Dagestan, Russia
- Kubachi ware, a style of Persian pottery
