= AP Art History =

Advanced Placement course and exam

Logo of AP Art History as of 2025

Advanced Placement (AP) Art History (also known as APAH) is an Advanced Placement art history course and exam offered by the College Board in the United States.

AP Art History is designed to allow students to examine major forms of artistic expression relevant to a variety of cultures evident in a wide variety of periods from the present to the past. Students acquire an ability to examine works of art critically, with intelligence and sensitivity, and to articulate their thoughts and experiences. The course content covers prehistoric, Mediterranean, European, American, Native American, African, Asian, Pacific, and contemporary art and architecture.

== Course ==
The course is designed to teach the following art historical skills:

- Visual Analysis
- Contextual Analysis
- Comparisons of Works of Art
- Artistic Traditions
- Visual Analysis of Unknown Works
- Attribution of Unknown Works
- Art Historical Interpretations
- Argumentation

The course is also built on five core "Big Ideas":

- Culture
- Interactions with Other Cultures
- Theories and Interpretations
- Materials, Processes, and Techniques
- Purpose and Audience

Starting in the 2015–2016 school year, College Board has introduced a new curriculum and exam for students to apply art historical skills to questions.

Topic Outline
Unit	Time Period	Approximate Exam Weighting
Unit 1: Global Prehistory	30,000 – 500 BCE	4%
Unit 2: Ancient Mediterranean	3500 BCE – 300 CE	15%
Unit 3: Early Europe and Colonial America	200 – 1750 CE	21%
Unit 4: Later Europe and Americas	1750 – 1980 CE	21%
Unit 5: Indigenous Americas	1000 BCE – 1980 CE	6%
Unit 6: Africa	1100 – 1980 CE	6%
Unit 7: West and Central Asia	500 BCE – 1980 CE	4%
Unit 8: South, East, and Southeast Asia	300 BCE – 1980 CE	8%
Unit 9: The Pacific	700 – 1980 CE	4%
Unit 10: Global Contemporary	1980 CE to Present	11%

== Exam ==
Multiple Choice (50% of Score)	Free Response (50% of Score)
80 Questions in 1 Hour; Approximately 8 Sets of 3–6 Questions Based on Color Images; 35% Individual Multiple Choice Questions; Based on the Knowledge of the 250 Required Images	6 Essay Questions in 2 Hours; Two 30-Minute Essay Questions; 7 Points Each; Four 15-Minute Essay Questions; 5 Points Each; Essay Questions Often Include Images of Works of Art as Stimuli; Based on the Knowledge of the 250 Required Images; Response Written in Academic Essay Format

=== Score distribution ===
The multiple-choice section of the exam is worth 50% of a student's score and the free response is worth 50%. Each correctly answered multiple choice question is worth one point. Wrong and omitted questions do not affect the raw score. For the free-response section, the four short essays are each graded on a scale of 0 to 5 and the two long essays are each graded on a scale of 0 to 7.

Final Score	2016	2017	2018	2019	2020	2021	2022	2023	2024	2025
5	11.1%	11%	12.8%	11.9%	15.8%	12.0%	14.1%	13.8%	13.9%	16.0%
4	22.6%	23.1%	24.3%	24.6%	24.9%	19.6%	21.0%	23.8%	21.5%	23.3%
3	27.7%	27.3%	27.6%	26.6%	28.0%	23.8%	26.3%	27.0%	27.2%	26.2%
2	27.6%	26.2%	25.5%	24.7%	21.3%	30.1%	26.9%	23.8%	24.8%	24.1%
1	11.0%	12.4%	9.8%	12.2%	10.0%	14.6%	11.6%	11.6%	12.5%	10.3%
% of Scores 3 or Higher	61.4%	61.4%	64.7%	63.1%	68.7%	55.3%	61.5%	64.6%	62.7%	65.6%
Mean Score	2.95	2.94	3.05	2.99	3.15	2.84	2.99	3.04	3.00	3.11
Standard Deviation	1.18	1.19	1.18	1.21	1.21	1.24	1.23	1.22	1.23	1.23
Number of Students	25,523	25,178	24,964	24,476	23,567	20,633	20,970	24,624	27,362	25,584

== Works studied ==
The current curriculum, which began in 2015, focuses on 250 works of art and architecture across 10 units, beginning with prehistoric art and ending with contemporary art.

Global Prehistory (30,000 – 500 BCE)

- Apollo 11 stone
- Great Hall of the Bulls
- Camelid sacrum in the shape of a canine
- Running horned woman
- Beaker with ibex motifs
- Anthropomorphic stele
- Jade cong
- Stonehenge
- The Ambum stone
- Tlatilco female figurine
- Terra cotta fragment

Ancient Mediterranean (3500 BCE – 300 CE)

- White Temple and its ziggurat
- Palette of King Narmer
- Statues of votive figures, from the Square Temple at Eshunna (modern Tell Asmar, Iraq)
- Seated scribe
- Standard of Ur from the Royal Tombs at Ur (modern Tell el-Muqayyar, Iraq)
- Great Pyramids (Menkaura, Khafre, Khufu) and Great Sphinx
- King Menkaure and queen
- The Code of Hammurabi
- Temple of Amun-Re and Hypostyle Hall
- Mortuary temple of Hatshepsut
- Akhenaten, Nefertiti, and three daughters
- Tutankhamun's tomb, innermost coffin
- Last judgement of Hunefer, from his tomb (page from the Book of the Dead)
- Lamassu from the citadel of Sargon II, Dur-Sharrukin (modern Khorsabad, Iraq)
- Athenian agora
- Anavysos Kouros
- Peplos Kore from the Acropolis
- Sarcophagus of the Spouses
- Audience Hall (apadana) of Darius and Xerxes
- Temple of Minerva (Veii, near Rome, Italy) and sculpture of Apollo
- Tomb of the Triclinium
- Niobides Krater
- Doryphoros (Spear Bearer)
- Acropolis
- Grave Stele of Hegeso
- Winged Victory of Samothrace
- Great Altar of Zeus and Athena at Pergamon
- House of the Vettii
- Alexander Mosaic from the House of Faun, Pompeii
- Seated boxer
- Head of a Roman patrician
- Augustus of Prima Porta
- Colosseum (Flavian Amphitheater)
- Forum of Trajan
- Pantheon
- Ludovisi Battle Sarcophagus

Early Europe and Colonial Americas (200 – 1750 CE)

- Catacomb of Priscilla
- Santa Sabina
- Rebecca and Eliezer at the Well and Jacob Wrestling the Angel, from the Vienna Genesis
- San Vitale
- Hagia Sophia
- Merovingian looped fibulae
- Virgin (Theotokos) and Child between Saints Theodore and George
- Lindisfarne Gospels: St. Matthew, cross-carpet page; St. Luke portrait page; St. Luke incipit page
- Great Mosque
- Pyxis of al-Mughira
- Church of Sainte-Foy
- Bayeux Tapestry
- Chartres Cathedral
- Dedication Page with Blanche of Castile and King Louis IX of France, Scenes from the Apocalypse
- Röttgen Pietà
- Arena (Scrovegni) Chapel, including Lamentation
- Golden Haggadah (The Plagues of Egypt, Scenes of Liberation, and Preparation for Passover)
- Alhambra
- Annunciation Triptych (Merode Altarpiece)
- Pazzi Chapel
- The Arnolfini Portrait
- David
- Palazzo Rucellai
- Madonna and Child with Two Angels
- Birth of Venus
- Last Supper
- Adam and Eve
- Sistine Chapel ceiling and altar wall frescoes
- School of Athens
- Isenheim altarpiece
- Entombment of Christ
- Allegory of Law and Grace
- Venus of Urbino
- Frontispiece of the Codex Mendoza
- Il Gesù, including Triumph of the Name of Jesus ceiling fresco
- Hunters in the Snow
- Mosque of Selim II
- Calling of Saint Matthew
- Henri IV Receives the Portrait of Marie de' Medici, from the Marie de' Medici Cycle
- Self-Portrait with Saskia
- San Carlo alle Quattro Fontane
- Ecstasy of Saint Teresa
- Angel with Arquebus, Asiel Timor Dei
- Las Meninas
- Woman Holding a Balance
- The Palace at Versailles
- Screen with the Siege of Belgrade and hunting scene
- The Virgin of Guadalupe (Virgen de Guadalupe)
- Fruit and Insects
- Spaniard and Indian Produce a Mestizo
- The Tête à Tête, from Marriage à la Mode

Later Europe and Americas (1750 – 1980 CE)

- Portrait of Sor Juana Inés de la Cruz
- A Philosopher Giving a Lecture on the Orrery
- The Swing
- Monticello
- The Oath of the Horatii
- George Washington
- Self-Portrait (Note: Painting by Élisabeth Vigée Le Brun.)
- Y no hai remedio (And There's Nothing to Be Done), from Los Desastres de la Guerra (The Disasters of War), plate 15
- La Grande Odalisque
- Liberty Leading the People
- The Oxbow (View from Mount Holyoke, Northampton, Massachusetts, after a Thunderstorm)
- Still Life in Studio (Note: Photograph by Louis Daguerre.), Louis-Jacques-Mandé Daguerre
- Slave Ship (Slavers Throwing Overboard the Dead and Dying, Typhoon Coming On)
- Palace of Westminster (Houses of Parliament)
- The Stone Breakers
- Nadar Raising Photography to the Height of Art
- Olympia
- The Saint-Lazare Station (Note: Painting by Claude Monet.)
- The Horse in Motion
- The Valley of Mexico from the Hillside of Santa Isabel (El Valle de México desde el Cerro de Santa Isabel)
- The Burghers of Calais
- The Starry Night
- The Coiffure
- The Scream
- Where Do We Come From? What Are We? Where Are We Going?
- Carson, Pirie, Scott and Company Building
- Mont Sainte-Victoire
- Les Demoiselles d'Avignon
- The Steerage
- The Kiss (Klimt)
- The Kiss (Brâncuși sculpture)
- The Portuguese
- Goldfish (Note: Painting by Henri Matisse.)
- Improvisation 28 (second version)
- Self-Portrait as a Soldier
- Memorial Sheet for Karl Liebknecht
- Villa Savoye
- Composition with Red, Blue, and Yellow
- Illustration from The Results of the First Five-Year Plan
- Object (Le Déjeuner en fourrure)
- Fallingwater
- The Two Fridas
- The Migration of the Negro, Panel no. 49
- The Jungle (Note: Painting by Wifredo Lam.)
- Dream of a Sunday Afternoon in the Alameda Park
- Fountain (second version)
- Woman, I
- Seagram Building
- Marilyn Diptych
- Narcissus Garden
- The Bay (Note: Painting by Helen Frankenthaler.)
- Lipstick (Ascending) on Caterpillar Tracks
- Spiral Jetty
- House in New Castle County

Indigenous Americas (1000 BCE – 1980 CE)

- Chavín de Huántar
- Mesa Verde cliff dwellings
- Yaxchilán
- Great Serpent Mound
- Templo Mayor (Main Temple)
- Ruler's feather headdress (probably of Motecuhzoma II)
- City of Cusco, including Qorikancha (Inka main temple), Santo Domingo (Spanish colonial convent), and Walls at Saqsa Waman (Sacsayhuaman)
- Maize cobs
- City of Machu Picchu
- All-T’oqapu tunic
- Bandolier bag (Note: Produced by the Delaware people.)
- Transformation mask
- Painted elk hide (Note: Made by Cotsiogo.)
- Black-on-black ceramic vessel

Africa (1100 – 1980 CE)

- Conical tower and circular wall of Great Zimbabwe
- Great Mosque of Djenné
- Wall plaque, from Oba's palace
- Sika dwa kofi (Golden Stool)
- Ndop (portrait figure) of King Mishe miShyaang maMbul
- Power figure (Nkisi n'kondi)
- Female (Pwo) mask
- Portrait mask (Mblo)
- Bundu mask
- Ikenga (shrine figure)
- Lukasa (memory board)
- Aka elephant mask
- Reliquary figure (byeri)
- Veranda post of enthroned king and senior wife (Opo Ogoga)

West and Central Asia (500 BCE – 1980 CE)

- Petra, Jordan: Treasury and Great Temple
- Buddha
- The Kaaba
- Jowo Rinpoche, enshrined in the Jokhang Temple
- Dome of the Rock
- Great Mosque (Masjid-e Jameh)
- Folio from a Qur'an
- Basin (Baptistère de St. Louis)
- Bahram Gur Fights the Karg, folio from the Great Il-Khanid Shahnama
- The Court of Gayumars, folio from Shah Tahmasp's Shahnama
- The Ardabil Carpet

South, East, and Southeast Asia (300 BCE – 1980 CE)

- Great Stupa at Sanchi
- Terra cotta warriors from mausoleum of the first Qin emperor of China
- Funeral banner of Lady Dai (Xin Zhui)
- Longmen caves
- Gold and jade crown
- Todai-ji
- Borobudur Temple
- Angkor, the temple of Angkor Wat, and the city of Angkor Thom, Cambodia
- Lakshmana Temple
- Travelers among Mountains and Streams
- Shiva as Lord of Dance (Nataraja)
- Night Attack on the Sanjô Palace
- The David Vases
- Portrait of Sin Sukju (1417–1475)
- Forbidden City
- Ryoan-ji
- Jahangir Preferring a Sufi Shaikh to Kings
- Taj Mahal
- Red and White Plum Blossoms
- Under the Wave off Kanagawa (Kanagawa oki nami ura), also known as the Great Wave, from the series Thirty-six Views of Mount Fuji
- Chairman Mao en Route to Anyuan

The Pacific (700 – 1980 CE)

- Nan Madol
- Moai on platform (ahu)
- 'Ahu 'ula (feather cape)
- Staff god (Note: Wooden cult figures from Rarotonga.)
- Female deity (Note: Wooden sculptures from Nukuoro.)
- Buk (mask)
- Hiapo (tapa)
- Tamati Waka Nene
- Navigation chart
- Malagan display and mask
- Presentation of Fijian mats and tapa cloths to Queen Elizabeth II

Global Contemporary (1980 CE – Present)

- The Gates
- Vietnam Veterans Memorial
- Horn Players (Note: Painting by Jean-Michel Basquiat.)
- Summer Trees (Note: Painting by Song Su-nam.)
- Androgyne III
- A Book from the Sky
- Pink Panther
- Untitled #228, from the History Portraits series
- The French Collection Part I, #1: Dancing at the Louvre
- Trade (Gifts for Trading Land with White People)
- Earth's Creation
- Rebellious Silence, from the Women of Allah series
- En la Barberia no se Llora (No Crying Allowed in the Barbershop)
- Pisupo Lua Afe (Corned Beef 2000)
- Electronic Superhighway
- The Crossing (Note: Mixed-media presentation by Bill Viola.)
- Guggenheim Museum Bilbao
- Pure Land (Note: Mixed-media presentation by Mariko Mori.)
- Lying with the Wolf
- Darkytown Rebellion
- The Swing (after Fragonard)
- Old Man's Cloth
- Stadia II
- Preying Mantra
- Shibboleth
- MAXXI National Museum of XXI Century Arts
- Kui Hua Zi (Sunflower Seeds)
