= APAH =

APAH may refer to the following Advanced Placement high school courses:

- AP Art History
- AP United States History (often called AP American History)
