= Horn Players =

Painting by Jean-Michel Basquiat

Horn Players is a 1983 acrylic and oil stick on canvas panel painting by Jean-Michel Basquiat. The work itself is a triptych, meaning it consists of three joined panels. The painting consists of three men, including two men with instruments and one more abstracted line drawing. The painting includes several blank white squares in addition to repeated phrases. The Horn Players is a required work for AP Art History students.

== Composition ==
The work is significantly abstracted, relying on shape, rather than form. Basquiat uses rough shapes, hard lines, and sharp contrasts. The painting is done over a black canvas, utilizing cool, jewel toned reds, blues and greens, which are juxtaposed against bright, saturated teal and pink. The work depicts a Black man in a blue suit playing a saxophone on the top left, in the center, a line drawing of a male face in pink, and a Black trumpet player on the right, wearing a green suit. The work utilizes an all-over composition, meaning there is no central focal point, instead, the eye is meant to wander.

== Inscriptions ==
A defining feature of Basquiat's work is his choice to include scrawled words and phrases. In Horn Players, Basquiat writes "alchemy", "Dizzy", and "Charlie Parker". Words describing the body are littered around the painting, including "larynx", "teeth", and "ear". "Dizzy" and "Charlie Parker" refer to Dizzy Gillespie and Charlie Parker, two jazz musicians. Next to the musicians, scat vocalizations are transcribed. Several words directly refer to Parker. "Pree" refers to his daughter, and "Chan" refers to his common-law wife. "Bird" and "Ornithology" refer to the Charlie Parker composition by the same name.
