= Ambum stone =

Ancient stone sculpture from Papua New Guinea

The Ambum stone may represent an anteater, fruit bat, bird, or mega-marsupial

The Ambum stone is an ancient stone sculpture thought to have been carved c. 1500 B.C.E. and found in New Guinea. Other similar stones excavated depict humans, birds, or other animals. Scientists are unsure exactly which animal this sculpture is meant to represent, but some believe it may represent a now extinct marsupial. Speculation also surrounds the object's intended purpose; some believe that it may have acted as a pestle.

== Discovery ==
The stone was discovered by Europeans in 1992, it was reportedly recovered from a cave in Ambum Valley which is located in the Western highlands province of Papua New Guinea.

== History ==
It is not known why the stone was created. The stone was found by the Enga of Papua New Guinea, and was thought to have ritual significance. It was found in a cave in the early 1960s, and in 1977, was acquired by the National Gallery of Australia. Some suspect that the stone was illegally exported from Papua New Guinea to be able to land in the National Gallery of Australia.

== Artifact damaged ==
In May 2000, the artifact was damaged while it was on loan to the Musée d'Arts Africains, Océaniens et Amérindiens. It broke into three main segments: the head, the body, and a chip off the head. Additionally, the artifact incurred several minor chips and surface bruises. It was later restored using adhesive and an inpaint to match the finish.
