= Buff ware =

Type of pottery from Umayyad period

Buff ware is a type of pottery that appeared in the Umayyad period, made of fine and light, almost white, clay.

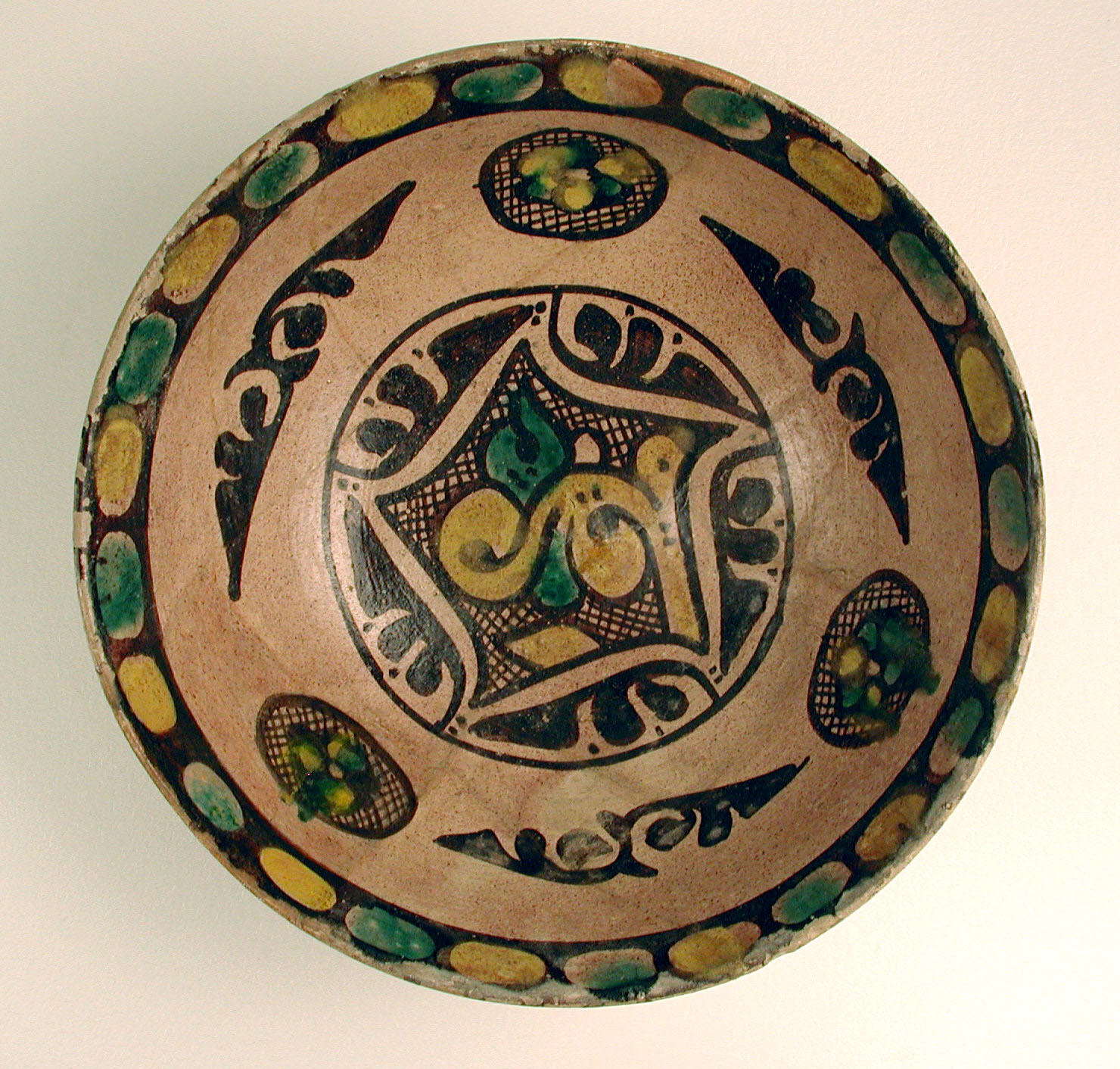
Buff ware bowl

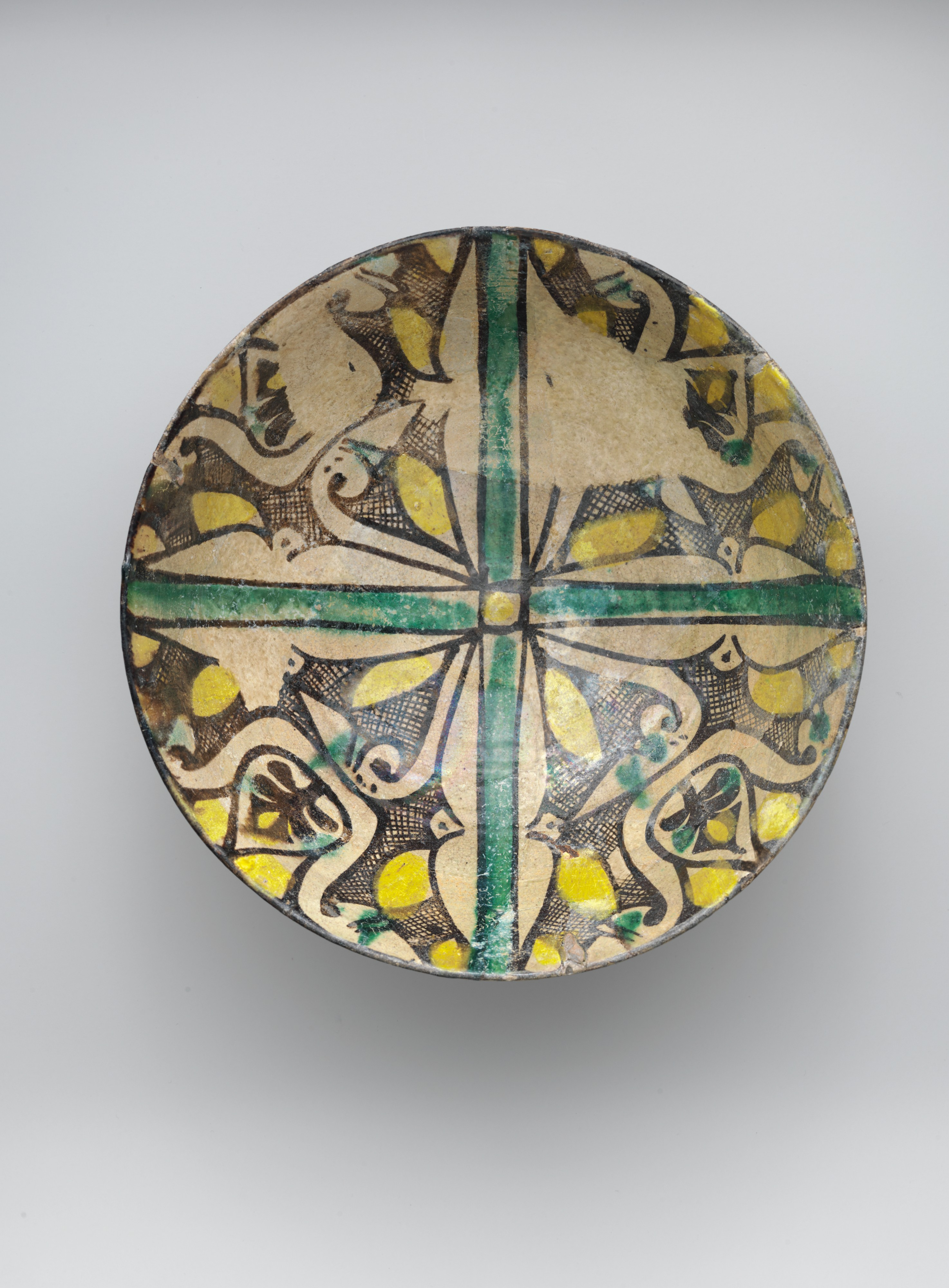
Buff ware bowl with geometric patterns

Brown on buff ware, associated with Bhirrana pottery was found at Bhirrana in Hisar district of Haryana state in India. Bhirrana is likely the oldest pre-Harappan neolithic site dating back to 7570-6200 BCE. Genome scientists, who used SNP analysis to identify mtDNA haplogroups, ascertained that the Bhirrana culture of India was dated to 9 tya (thousand year ago).

== See also ==
- Archaeological culture
- Fabric analysis of pottery
- Indian Pottery cultures
- Pottery archaeology
- 'Six fabrics of Kalibanagan' pottery
