= Seljuk pottery =

Pottery of the Seljuk Empire

Characterized by lusterware and mina'i techniques, Seljuk pottery was able to accelerate in production, which made way for new designs, motifs, and patterns to emerge.

== History and context ==
The Seljuk Empire was a Sunni Muslim Turko-Persian empire that spanned over Anatolia to Central Asia between 1037 and 1194 until the Mongol invasion. Extending from Syria to India, diverse cultures made up Seljuk territory, and as Seljuk rulers adhered and assimilated into Persian-Islamic traditions, Seljuk artwork became an amalgam of Persian, Islamic, and Central Asian—Turkic characteristics. In addition to local influences and government support, the hybridity of Seljuk art was also a byproduct of trade from the Silk Road. Experimentation with various techniques, technology, and styles across Eurasia ultimately resulted in a uniquely "Seljuk style" of ceramics and pottery.

== Technology and manufacturing ==
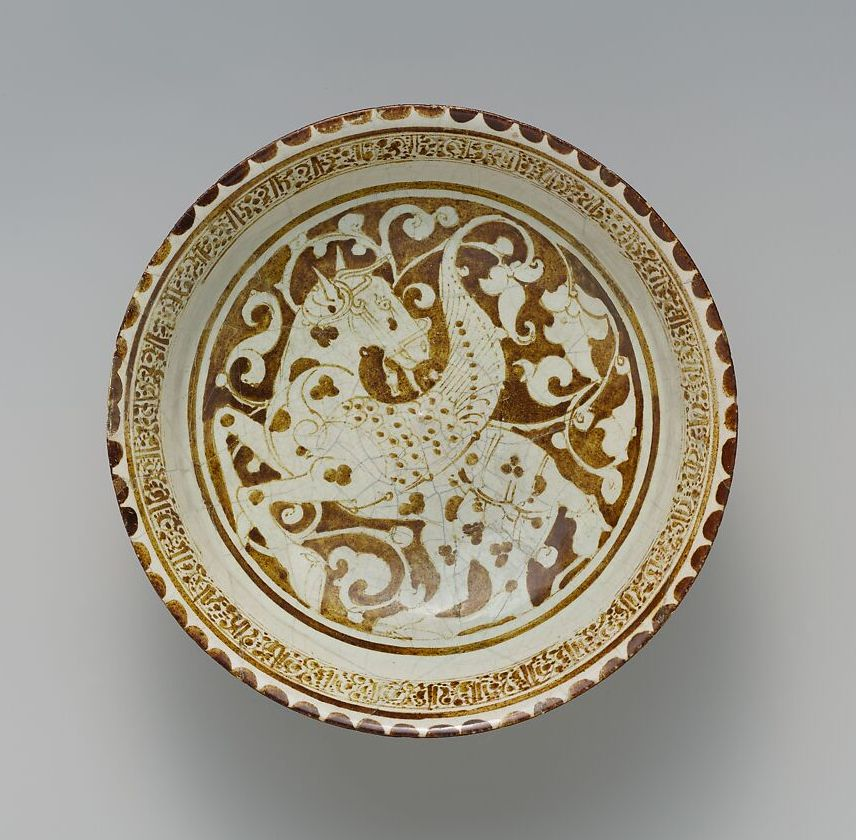
Late 12th century. Made in Iran. Stonepaste; luster-painted on opaque monochrome glaze. H. 8.3 cm, Diam. 20.3 cm.

Summary of Development Broadly, Islamic ceramic mediums of the Seljuk region used the principles of glazed composition, where finely powdered quartz would be fused together with a heated bonding agent, typically alkali or lime. What distinguishes Islamic ceramic mediums, called stonepaste, fritware, or siliceous ware, is that the bonding material is sourced from a liquified glass and refined clay. In all cases, this medium can be dyed, molded by hand, and hardened with firing. As the production of stonepaste accelerated, the ceramics of the Syrian and Persian regions of the Seljuk developed stylistically with greater detail and divergence in ornamentation, such as in luster painting, mina'i (polychrome enamel), and glaze. Luster painting and mina'i both involve painting an overglaze onto a previously glazed and fired stonepaste body at a lower temperature. Lusterware was a costly process that required expertise as it deals with compounds such as metal oxides, sulfur, and a refractive medium in addition to a glaze. Mina'i involved layers of pigmented glazes though second firings (commonly with blue, turquoise, and purple as a base layer with a red, black, green, pink, brown, yellow, or white secondary coat), and some pieces were gilded.

Kashan Between the 1770s and 1220s, ceramic wares were mainly exported out of the city of Kashan in central Iran. Kashan was able to produce fritware due to its location, being near the necessary resources. Luster painting, characterized by an opacified glaze in Kashan, and mina'i, techniques requiring expertise, were associated with the city, and it is theorized that there may have been a monopoly around the twelfth century.

== Formal typology ==
Seljuk pottery came in a variety of forms. So while there are no specific shapes that classify ceramics Iranian or Seljuk, the following list describes common shapes and types of pottery:

- Cup (beaker): Characterized by a long and round base, concave body, smooth edge and turned outwards.
- Stoup, Flagon, Ewer, Pitcher: Made of glass paste, has a concave circular base, spherical body, short cylindrical neck and is turned outwards with a decorative handle and groove.
- Bottle: These have a tall oval vessel as a body with a short neck and a handle up to the mouth to help drinking.
- Bowl: With a long, round, concave base and an elongated body that is vertical near the edge.
- Carafe: Featured by a long round base, a spherical body and a neck that is divided into two parts: a cylindrical shape on top of a spherical shape.
- Small crock, Vat, Jar: These have a long circular base, a large spherical body, and an inverted edge.
- Plate, Dish: Round with a shallow concave base.
- Drinking Utensils: Closer to the shape of a modern cup with edges turned outwards and an unglazed lower base.

== Themes, motifs, and style ==
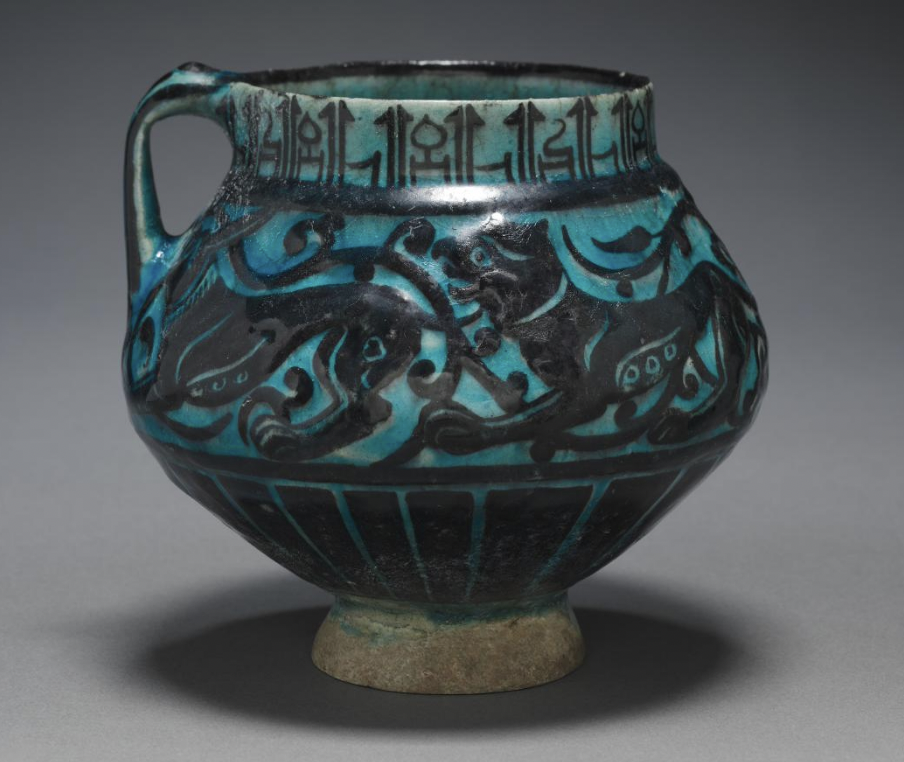
Jug with Running Animals.1150-1220. Iran (Kashan) Seljuk period. Silhouette ware. 13x14 cm.

=== Silhouette pottery ===
Method Silhouette pottery techniques developed during the Seljuk period following scratching or Sgraffito technique from the previous period. To execute this type of ceramic ware, glazes of black slip-paint and turquoise ivory would be layered to create patterns, typically that of people, animals, and plants.

Location Excavations have shown that Kashan, Rey, Gurgan (Jorjan) and Nishabur and Sirjan were major centers for making this type of pottery.

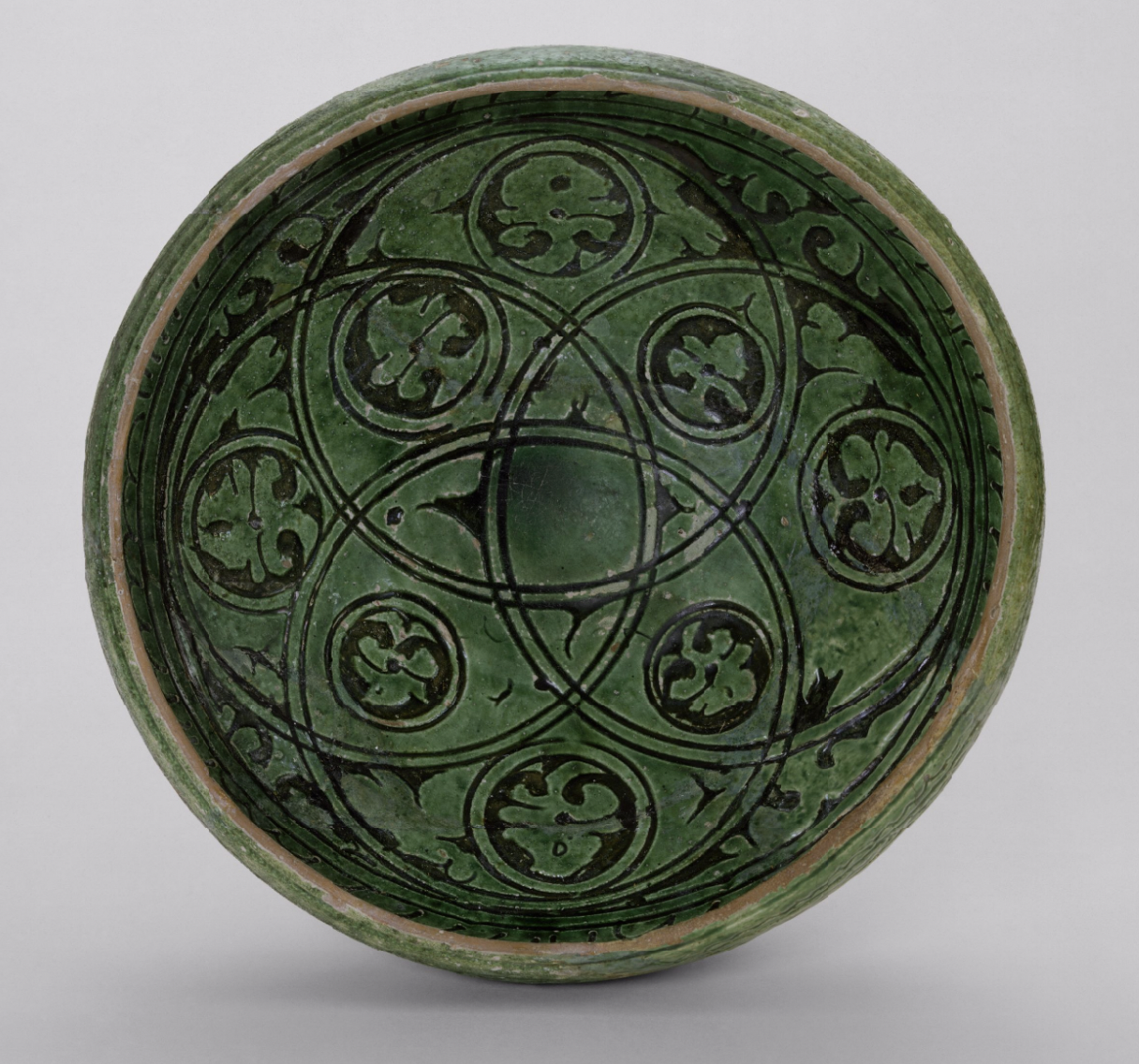
Bowl with Vegetal Motifs.12th-13th century. Iran, Seljuq period. Earthenware.

=== General stylistic trends ===
Plants Artwork from the Middle East often exhibit vegetal and floral patterns, and this extends to Seljuk pottery. Typically taking ornamental form (decorative artistic expression, not the subject), shapes that resemble plants adorn the margins.

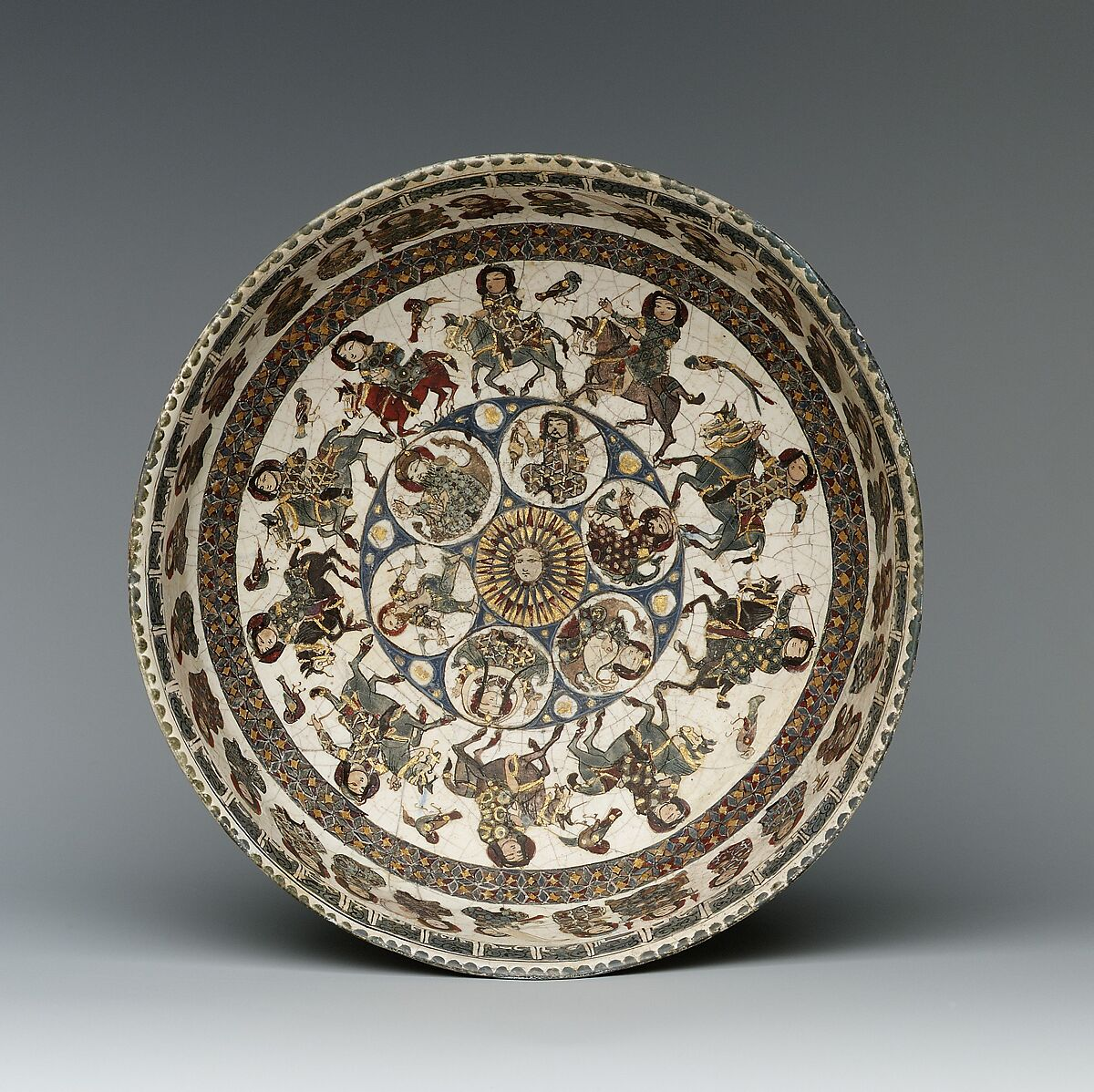
Bowl with Courtly and Astrological Motifs. Late 12th–early 13th century. Northern Iran, Seljuq period. H. 9.5cm, D. 18.7 cm.

From architecture, it was found that floral ornamentation of the Seljuk period is known for the width of the stems, which are much thinner than their Abbasid Samarra predecessors. Seljuk vegetal motifs are also characterized by the dimension of the leaves. Leaves are often depicted with elongated proportions and falcate shapes. These themes, notably "Seljuk," recur in ceramics.

Humans and Animals Figural representation in the Islamic world coexisted with resistance and anxiety in the light of potential Qur'anic conflict, as musawwir (“maker of forms,” or artist) may claim creator-hood. Therefore, it became common practice for Arabic inscriptions themselves to carry the animated spirit; however, by the Seljuk period, human and animal figures gradually emerged. Further, while the Seljuk Empire was officially Sunni, the region's Zoroastrianism presence manifested in its pottery through symbolism and allegories.

Inspired by legends and centered on faith, bird motifs (soul, divinity, human flight) and other animals such as deer (beauty, dignity), peacocks, goats, and rabbit appeared on dishes. Horsemen also emerged in Seljuk pottery with a sense of rotating movement to suggest a cosmic state. Human images were also then employed to depict activities such as dancing and hunting, court and royal life, as well as to illustrate mythological stories.

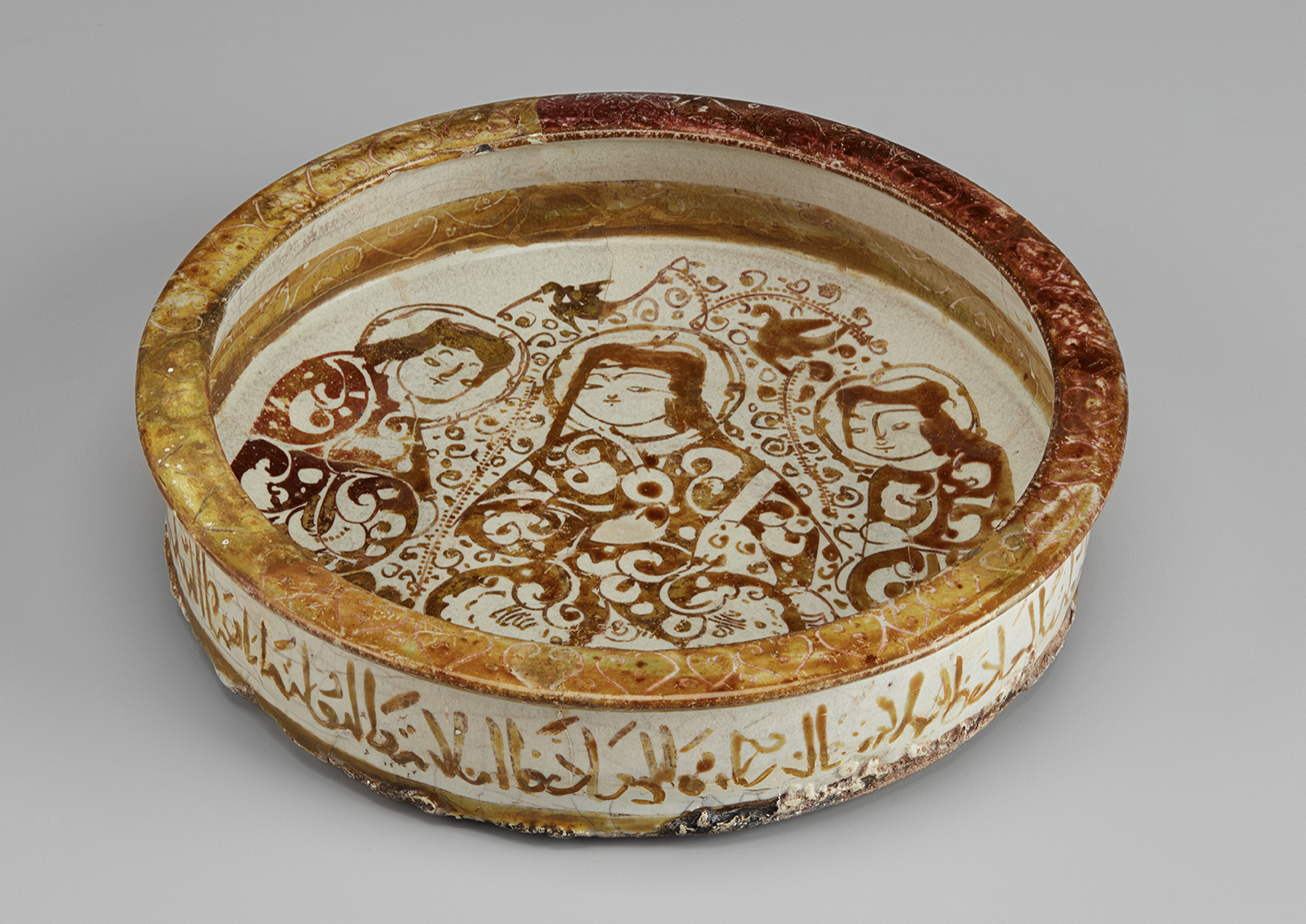
Lustre-Painted Dish, Front. 12th–13th century. Kashan, Iran. Fritware, lustre painted.

Calligraphy Various types of script templates developed during the Seljuk era among Kofi and Naskh. Kofi script was popular and harmonized well with geometric designs for its dynamic and distinct movement. It was often used in religious context as its symbolic identity alluded to originality, spirituality, and a firmness. On the other hand, Naskh was known for its more cursive-like aesthetic curvatures that balanced negative and positive space.

== Economic implications ==
Before the spread of stoneware and glazing techniques, one of the easiest forms of pottery to manufacture was called qoli, which imitated Chinese porcelain with a white body but with a loose glaze. Artifacts in Rey and easy production suggest that these pieces were commonly owned by lower classes. Once the stonepaste industry expanded with heightened efficiency (around the twelfth century), ceramic products became more affordable and widespread. However, this did not "level-out" social classes.

During the Seljuk period, religious identity and teaching exposed urban merchants, traders, craftsmen, and artisans to a broader education, and this group made up the new middle class. With access to luxury goods, this group could not afford to patronize gold and silverware. Hence, enameled and decorated pottery, or luster (mina'i) ceramics, became a marker of middle class luxury, expressing both success economically and faith as Quaranic script and Arabic hadiths would be a part of the design. Distinctions in ceramic styles diverged with bourgeois "special art" and middle class "common art" becoming more identifiable by the presence of precious metals.

As the Seljuk economy stabilized, cultural exchange also played a part in directing ceramic style. Motifs from the Far East were introduced with exposure to the Mongols and Chinese Song dynasty by the silk road. Reference and appeal to the Mongols would be depicted by figures with round faces and almond eyes. Chinese motifs such a phoenixes, dragons, and lotuses occurred in Seljuk ceramic work, and Chinese figures were also portrayed, identifiable by their clothing.

== Gallery ==
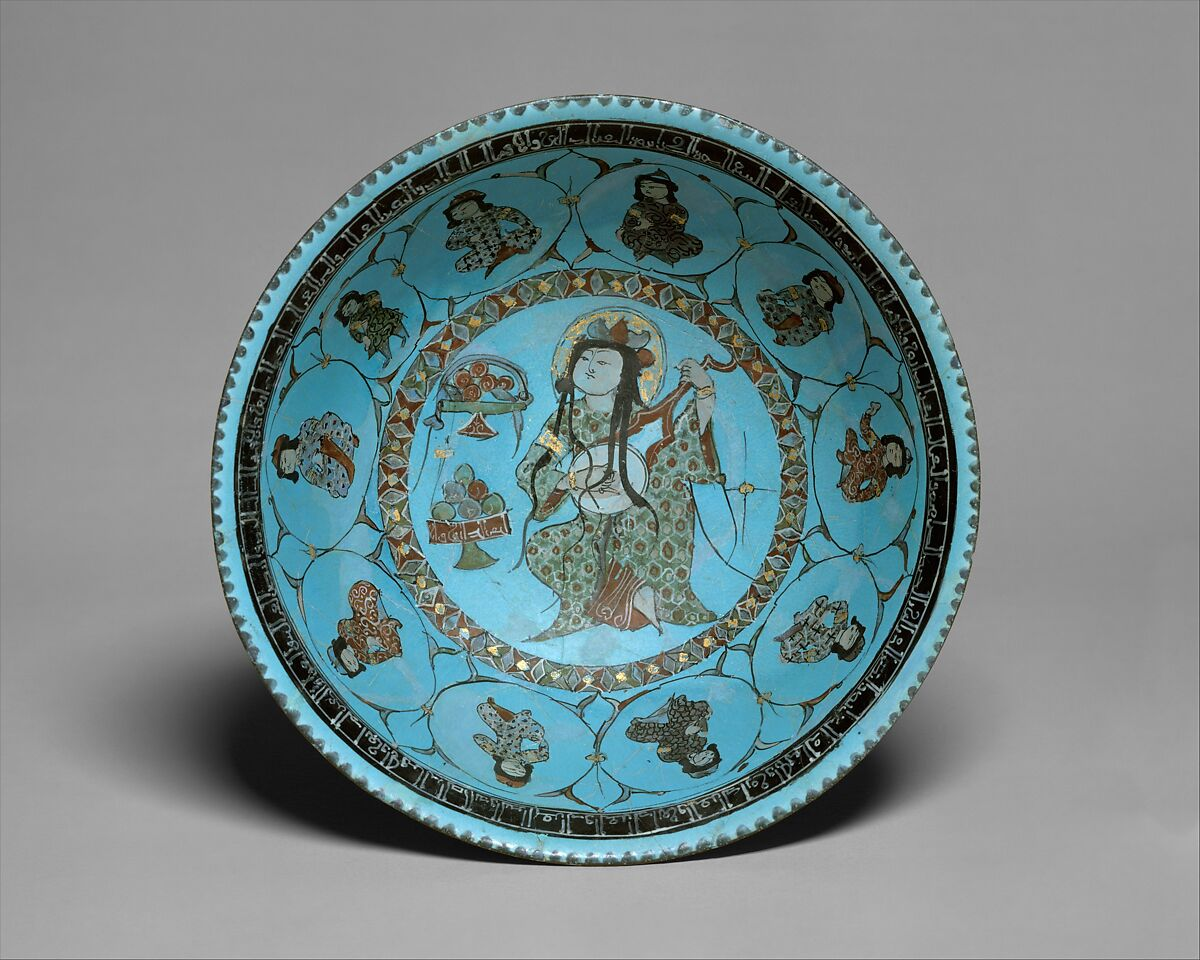
Turquoise Bowl with Lute Player and Audience. Late 12th–early 13th century. Iran. Stonepaste; glazed. H. 8.9 cm, D. 19.7 cm.

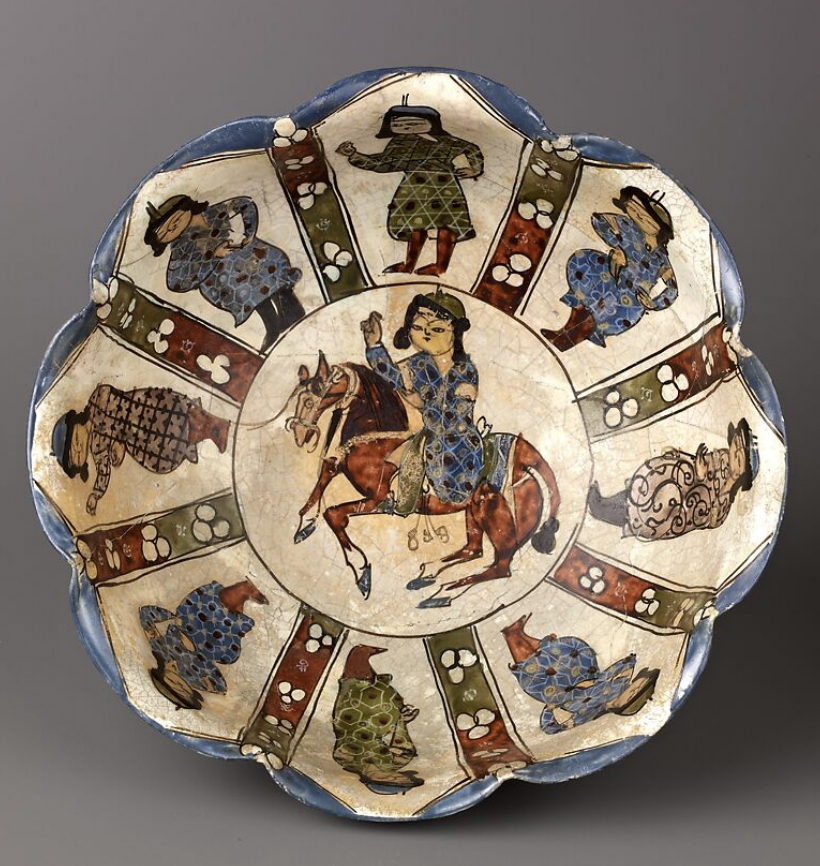
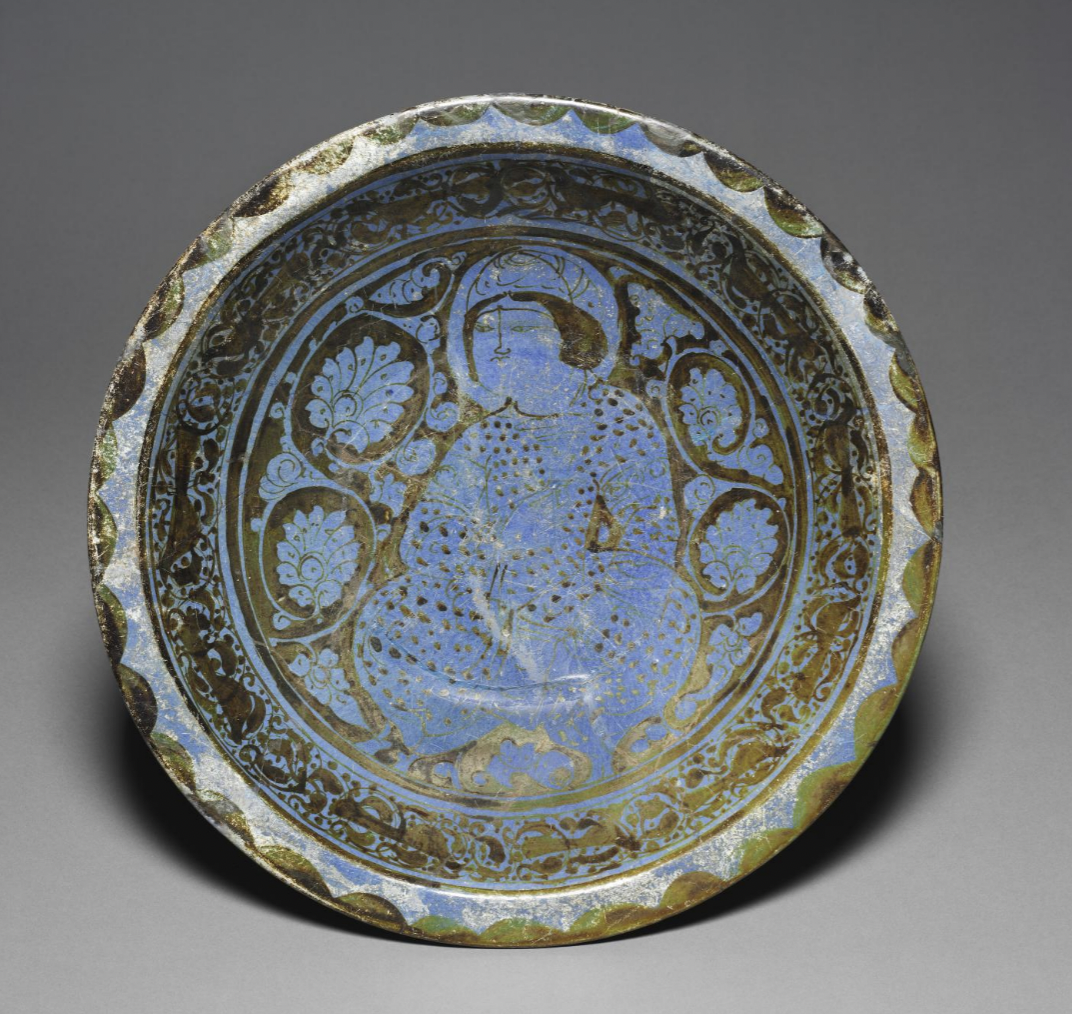

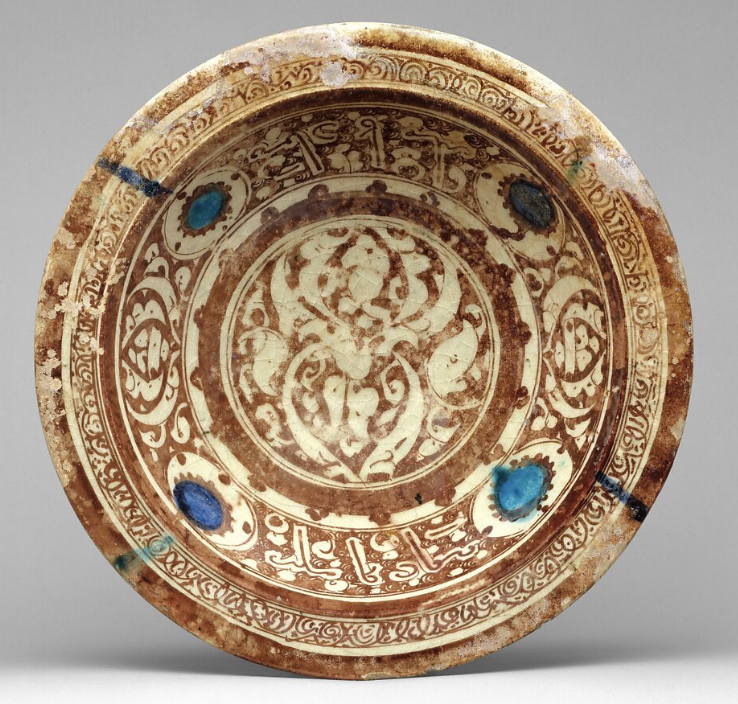

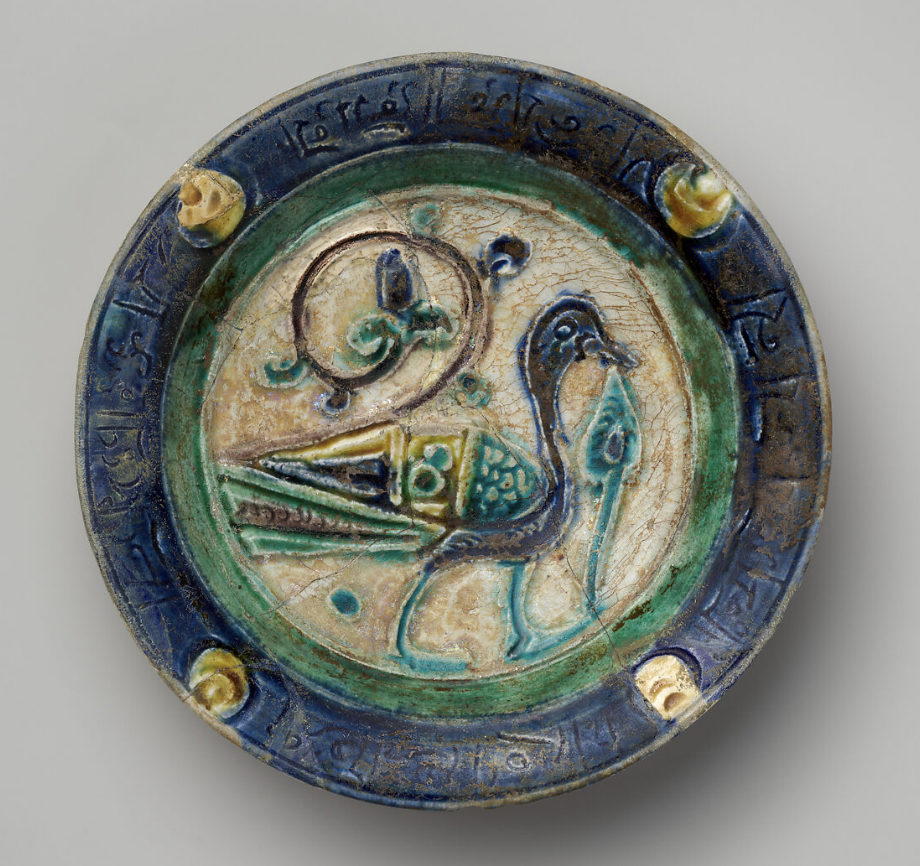
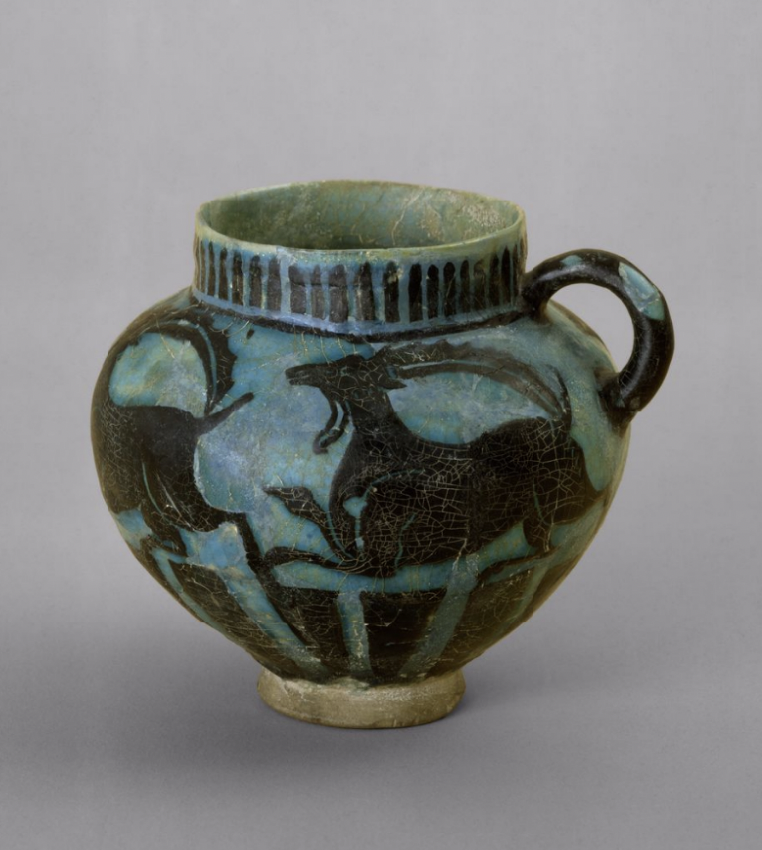
