= Kubachi (urban-type settlement) =

Kubachi Кубачи
- Urban-type settlement

Other transcription(s)
  - Dargwa: Гӏургъбаже
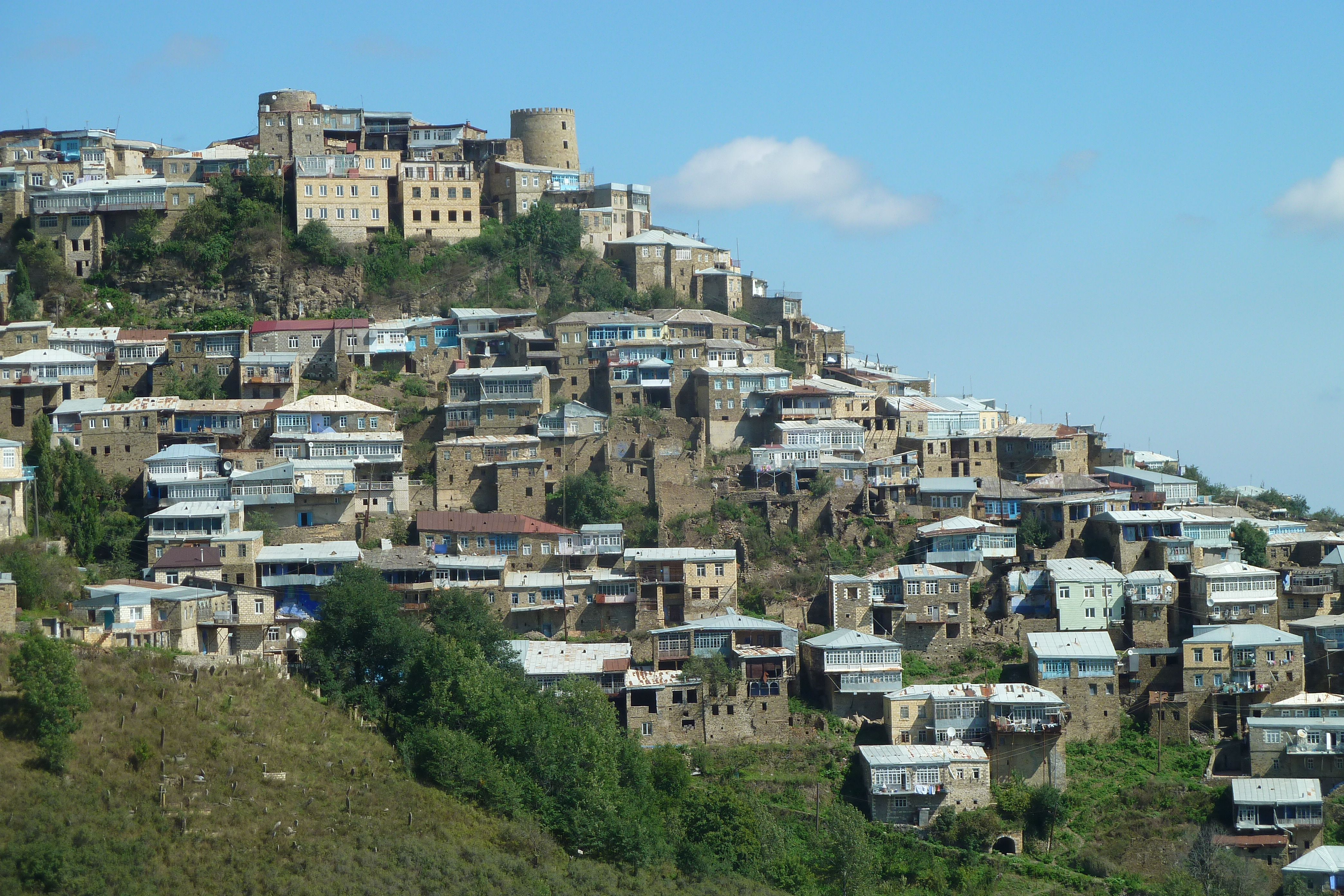
- View of Kubachi
- Interactive map of Kubachi
- Location of Kubachi Kubachi (Republic of Dagestan)
- Coordinates: 42°06′N 47°36′E
- Country: Russia
- Federal subject: Dagestan
- Administrative district: Dakhadayevsky District
- SettlementSelsoviet: Kubachi Settlement
- Urban-type settlement status since: 1965
- Elevation: 1,750 m (5,740 ft)

Population (2010 Census)
  - Total: 3,060
  - Estimate (2025): 2,982 (−2.5%)

Administrative status
  - Capital of: Kubachi Settlement

Municipal status
  - Municipal district: Dakhadayevsky Municipal District
  - Urban settlement: Kubachi Urban Settlement
  - Capital of: Kubachi Urban Settlement
- Time zone: UTC+3 (MSK)
- Postal code: 368572
- OKTMO ID: 82618489101

Kubachi population
- 2010 Census: 3,060
- 2002 Census: 2,781
- 1989 Census: 1,753
- 1979 Census: 1,822

Kubachi (Russian: Кубачи́; Dargwa: ГӏярбукI, Kubachi: Арбукáнти) is an urban locality (an urban-type settlement) in Dakhadayevsky District of the Republic of Dagestan, Russia. As of the 2010 Census, its population was 3,060.

== History ==
Kubachi is the namesake of Kubachi ware, a style of Persian pottery which was found in great abundance here. In Persian chronicles, the village is mentioned as early as the 4th century under the Persian name of زره‌گران Zerihgaran (Place of chain mail makers).

Urban-type settlement status was granted to Kubachi in 1965.

== Administrative and municipal status ==
Within the framework of administrative divisions, the urban-type settlement of Kubachi is incorporated within Dakhadayevsky District as Kubachi Settlement (an administrative division of the district). As a municipal division, Kubachi Settlement is incorporated within Dakhadayevsky Municipal District as Kubachi Urban Settlement.

== See also ==
- Kubachi silver
- Kubachi ware
