= Bushel with ibex motifs =

Prehistoric pottery artifact from Susa

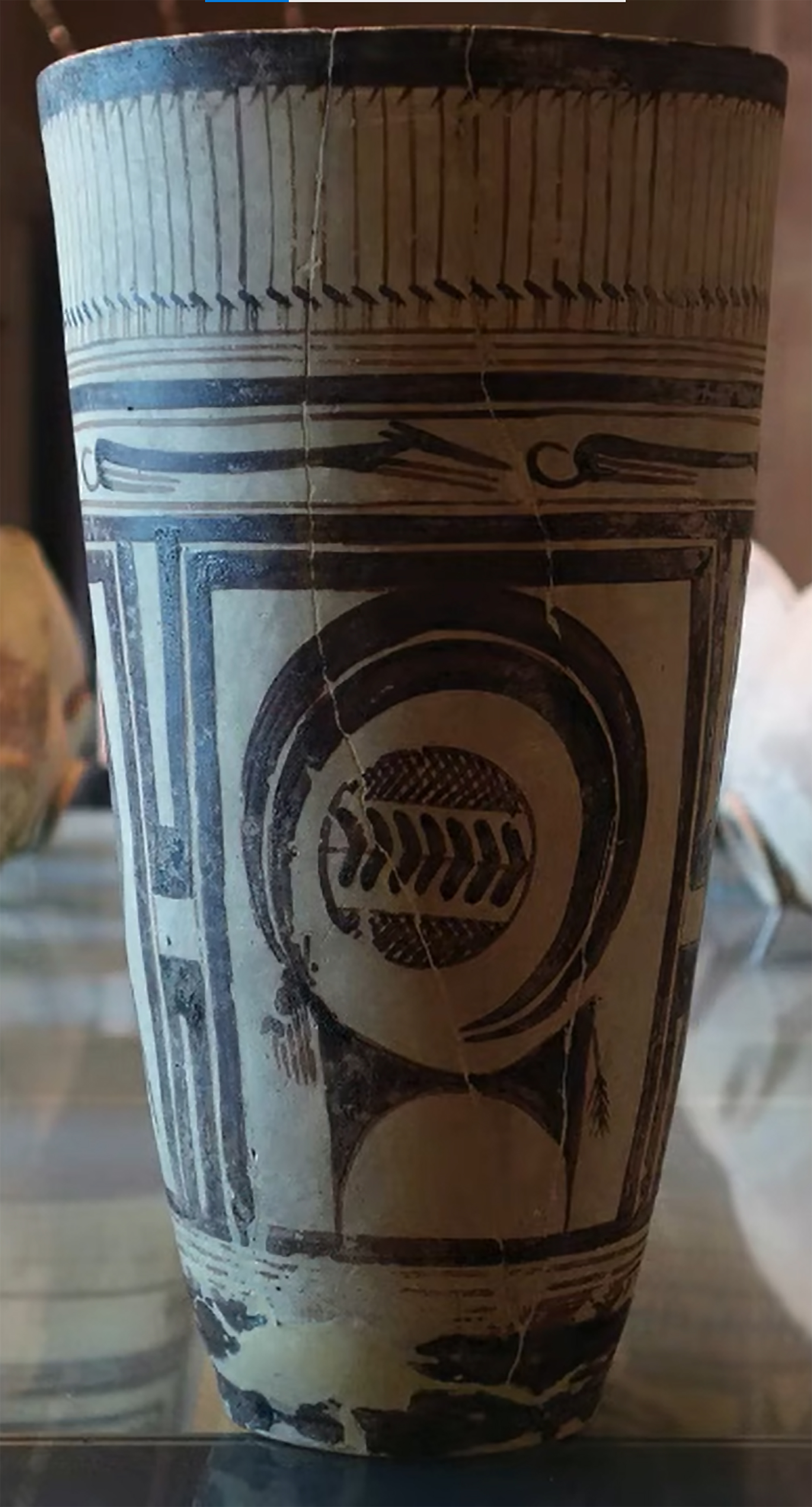
- Material: Terracotta
- Height: 28.9 cm
- Width: 16.4 cm
- Created: c. 3850 BC
- Discovered: c. 1907; Shush, Khuzestan, Iran
- Present location: Paris, Ile-de-France, France

The bushel with ibex motifs, also known as the beaker with ibex motifs, is a prehistoric pottery artifact originating from Susa, an ancient city in the Near East located in modern-day Iran. This piece of art is believed to have been created during the Susa I period, between 4200 and 3500 BCE. The bushel is a large vessel, measuring 28.9 x 16.4 cm, and was used as a funerary item among the first inhabitants of Susa.

The bushel is considered an example of animal style, a decorative approach in art that emphasizes animal motifs. The bushel features various animal motifs including long-necked birds in the upper register, thought to be a kind of wading water bird commonly seen in the region's plains during winter. The next register showcases reclining dogs, which are believed to be saluki or greyhound type hunting dogs typical of the area.

The most notable feature of the bushel is the ibex, or mountain goat, motifs, located below the dogs. The ibex, a native of the Zagros Mountain range near Susa, is portrayed in a non-naturalistic style using simple shapes such as triangles. The goat's horns are depicted as arched back over its body, forming a circle. The roundness of the horns and other geometric elements of the bushel are said to emphasize its cylindrical shape.

The bushel was discovered during a 1906–1908 excavation of a Susian necropolis led by Jacques de Morgan. It is now housed in the Louvre Museum in Paris, France, where it is recognized as a unique and well-crafted piece.
