= Druzhba, Russia =

Druzhba (Russian: Дру́жба, means “friendship”) is the name of several rural localities in Russia:

- Druzhba, Republic of Adygea, a settlement in Koshekhablsky District of the Republic of Adygea
- Druzhba, Aleysky District, Altai Krai, a selo in Druzhbinsky Selsoviet of Aleysky District of Altai Krai
- Druzhba, Shipunovsky District, Altai Krai, a settlement in Samsonovsky Selsoviet of Shipunovsky District of Altai Krai
- Druzhba, Topchikhinsky District, Altai Krai, a settlement in Pobedimsky Selsoviet of Topchikhinsky District of Altai Krai
- Druzhba, Tselinny District, Altai Krai, a selo in Druzhbinsky Selsoviet of Tselinny District of Altai Krai
- Druzhba, Ust-Kalmansky District, Altai Krai, a settlement in Charyshsky Selsoviet of Ust-Kalmansky District of Altai Krai
- Druzhba, Republic of Bashkortostan, a selo in Polyakovsky Selsoviet of Davlekanovsky District of the Republic of Bashkortostan
- Druzhba, Belgorod Oblast, a settlement in Yablonovsky Rural Okrug of Valuysky District of Belgorod Oblast
- Druzhba, Dyatkovsky District, Bryansk Oblast, a settlement in Bolshezhukovsky Selsoviet of Dyatkovsky District of Bryansk Oblast
- Druzhba, Novozybkovsky District, Bryansk Oblast, a settlement in Trostansky Selsoviet of Novozybkovsky District of Bryansk Oblast
- Druzhba, Chechen Republic, a settlement in Proletarskaya Rural Administration of Groznensky District of the Chechen Republic
- Druzhba, Republic of Dagestan, a selo in Kayakentsky District of the Republic of Dagestan
- Druzhba, Pravdinsky District, Kaliningrad Oblast, a settlement under the administrative jurisdiction of the town of district significance of Pravdinsk in Pravdinsky District of Kaliningrad Oblast
- Druzhba, Zelenogradsky District, Kaliningrad Oblast, a settlement in Krasnotorovsky Rural Okrug of Zelenogradsky District of Kaliningrad Oblast
- Druzhba, Karachay-Cherkess Republic, a selo in Prikubansky District of the Karachay-Cherkess Republic
- Druzhba, Khabarovsk Krai, a selo in Khabarovsky District of Khabarovsk Krai
- Druzhba, Kostroma Oblast, a settlement in Sudislavskoye Settlement of Sudislavsky District of Kostroma Oblast
- Druzhba, Lipetsk Oblast, a settlement in Stanovlyansky Selsoviet of Stanovlyansky District of Lipetsk Oblast
- Druzhba, Mari El Republic, a village in Kuzhmarsky Rural Okrug of Zvenigovsky District of the Mari El Republic
- Druzhba, Moscow Oblast, a settlement in Kuznetsovskoye Rural Settlement of Ramensky District of Moscow Oblast
- Druzhba, Nizhny Novgorod Oblast, a settlement in Turtapinsky Selsoviet under the administrative jurisdiction of town of oblast significance of Vyksa, Nizhny Novgorod Oblast
- Druzhba, Republic of North Ossetia–Alania, a settlement in Veselovsky Rural Okrug of Mozdoksky District of the Republic of North Ossetia–Alania
- Druzhba, Orenburg Oblast, a selo in Druzhbinsky Selsoviet of Sol-Iletsky District of Orenburg Oblast
- Druzhba, Oryol Oblast, a village in Droskovsky Selsoviet of Pokrovsky District of Oryol Oblast
- Druzhba, Perm Krai, a settlement in Ochyorsky District of Perm Krai
- Druzhba, Primorsky Krai, a selo in Pogranichny District of Primorsky Krai
- Druzhba, Bezenchuksky District, Samara Oblast, a settlement in Bezenchuksky District of Samara Oblast
- Druzhba, Syzransky District, Samara Oblast, a settlement in Syzransky District of Samara Oblast
- Druzhba, Shumyachsky District, Smolensk Oblast, a village in Nadeykovichskoye Rural Settlement of Shumyachsky District of Smolensk Oblast
- Druzhba, Vyazemsky District, Smolensk Oblast, a village in Kalpitskoye Rural Settlement of Vyazemsky District of Smolensk Oblast
- Druzhba, Stavropol Krai, a settlement in Gorkovsky Selsoviet of Novoalexandrovsky District of Stavropol Krai
- Druzhba, Sverdlovsk Oblast, a settlement in Alapayevsky District of Sverdlovsk Oblast
- Druzhba, Tambov Oblast, a settlement in Chernyanovsky Selsoviet of Tambovsky District of Tambov Oblast
- Druzhba, Mamadyshsky District, Republic of Tatarstan, a settlement in Mamadyshsky District of the Republic of Tatarstan
- Druzhba, Menzelinsky District, Republic of Tatarstan, a village in Menzelinsky District of the Republic of Tatarstan
- Druzhba, Sarmanovsky District, Republic of Tatarstan, a village in Sarmanovsky District of the Republic of Tatarstan
- Druzhba, Kamensky District, Tula Oblast, a village in Soklakovsky Rural Okrug of Kamensky District of Tula Oblast
- Druzhba, Kimovsky District, Tula Oblast, a settlement in Pronsky Rural Okrug of Kimovsky District of Tula Oblast
- Druzhba, Shchyokinsky District, Tula Oblast, a village in Kostomarovskaya Rural Administration of Shchyokinsky District of Tula Oblast
- Druzhba, Tuva Republic, a selo in Eer-Khavak Sumon (rural Settlement) of Bay-Tayginsky District of the Tuva Republic
- Druzhba, Tver Oblast, a village in Chertolino Rural Settlement of Rzhevsky District of Tver Oblast
- Druzhba, Maynsky District, Ulyanovsk Oblast, a settlement in Vyrovsky Rural Okrug of Maynsky District of Ulyanovsk Oblast
- Druzhba, Ulyanovsky District, Ulyanovsk Oblast, a settlement in Tetyushsky Rural Okrug of Ulyanovsky District of Ulyanovsk Oblast
- Druzhba, Vladimir Oblast, a settlement in Kameshkovsky District of Vladimir Oblast
- Druzhba, Vologda Oblast, a settlement in Semigorodny Selsoviet of Kharovsky District of Vologda Oblast
- Druzhba, Nizhnedevitsky District, Voronezh Oblast, a khutor in Skupopotudanskoye Rural Settlement of Nizhnedevitsky District of Voronezh Oblast
- Druzhba, Repyovsky District, Voronezh Oblast, a khutor in Rossoshanskoye Rural Settlement of Repyovsky District of Voronezh Oblast
- Druzhba, Nekouzsky District, Yaroslavl Oblast, a settlement in Rodionovsky Rural Okrug of Nekouzsky District of Yaroslavl Oblast
- Druzhba, Rybinsky District, Yaroslavl Oblast, a village in Pokrovsky Rural Okrug of Rybinsky District of Yaroslavl Oblast
