= Gorki (selo), Kameshkovsky District, Vladimir Oblast =

Gorki Горки
- Selo
- Location within Vladimir Oblast Location within Russia
- Coordinates: 56°17′N 41°00′E
- Country: Russia
- Region: Vladimir Oblast
- District: Kameshkovsky District
- Time zone: UTC+3:00

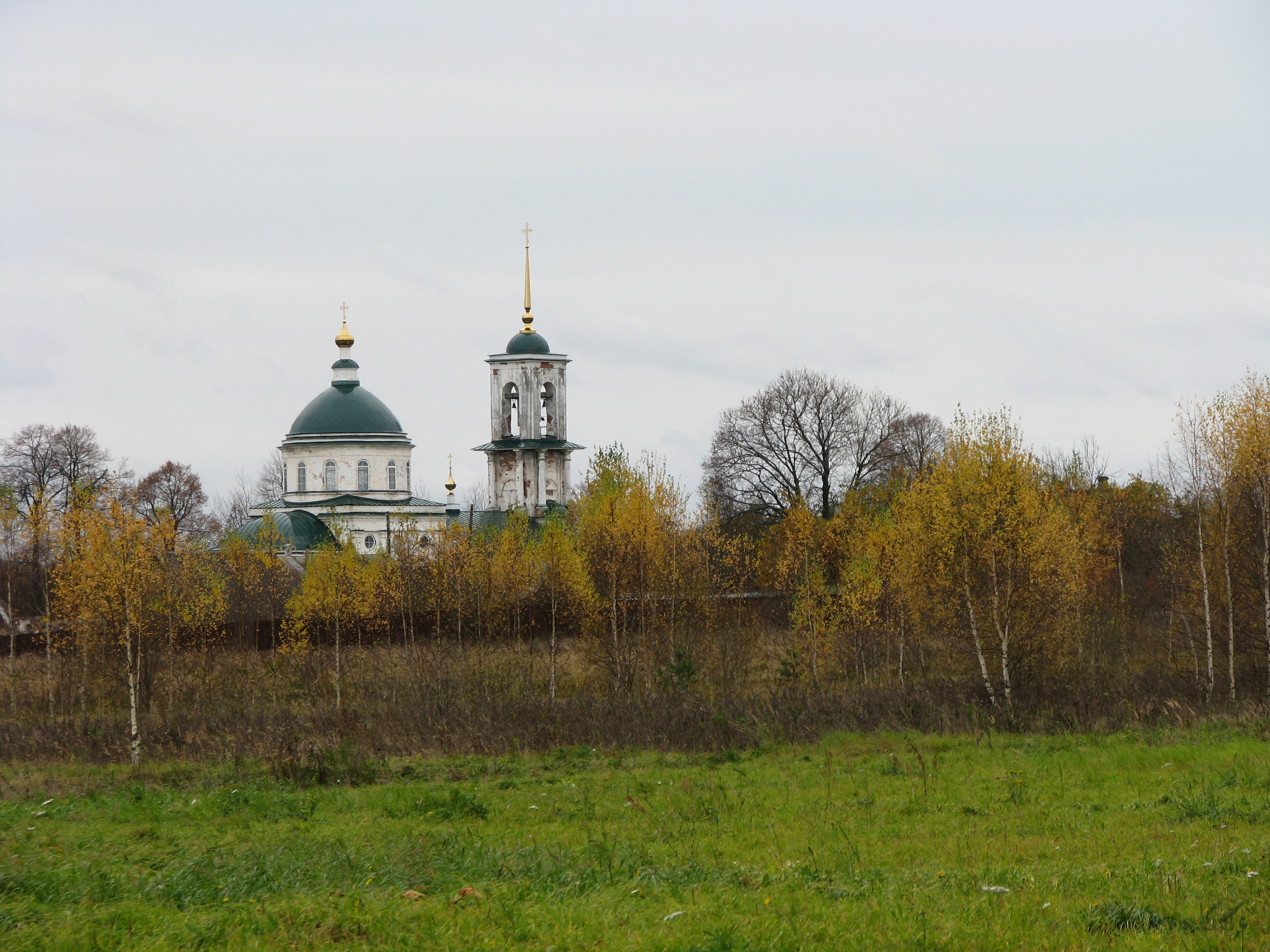
The Church of the Holy Trinity in Gorki

Gorki (Russian: Горки) is a rural locality (a selo) in Vtorovskoye Rural Settlement, Kameshkovsky District, Vladimir Oblast, Russia. The population was 61 as of 2010. There is 1 street.

== Geography ==
The village is located 19 km north-east from Vtorovo, 7 km south from Kameshkovo.
