= Nerlinka =

Nerlinka Нерлинка
- Village
- Location within Vladimir Oblast Location within Russia
- Coordinates: 56°19′N 40°40′E
- Country: Russia
- Region: Vladimir Oblast
- District: Kameshkovsky District
- Time zone: UTC+3:00

Nerlinka (Russian: Нерлинка) is a rural locality (a village) in Sergeikhinskoye Rural Settlement, Kameshkovsky District, Vladimir Oblast, Russia. The population was 7 as of 2010.

== Geography ==
Nerlinka is located on the Nerl River, 25 km west of Kameshkovo (the district's administrative centre) by road. Kruglovo is the nearest rural locality.
