= Posyolok imeni Kirova =

Posyolok imeni Kirova Посёлок имени Кирова
- Settlement
- Location within Vladimir Oblast Location within Russia
- Coordinates: 56°27′N 41°01′E
- Country: Russia
- Region: Vladimir Oblast
- District: Kameshkovsky District
- Time zone: UTC+3:00

Posyolok imeni Kirova (Russian: Посёлок имени Кирова) is a rural locality (a settlement) in Bryzgalovskoye Rural Settlement, Kameshkovsky District, Vladimir Oblast, Russia. The population was 380 as of 2010. There are 5 streets.

== Geography ==
The village is located 8 km north-west from Posyolok imeni Karla Marksa, 14 km north from Kameshkovo.
