= Pishchikhino =

Pishchikhino Пищихино
- Village
- Location within Vladimir Oblast Location within Russia
- Coordinates: 56°17′N 40°45′E
- Country: Russia
- Region: Vladimir Oblast
- District: Kameshkovsky District
- Time zone: UTC+3:00

Pishchikhino (Russian: Пищихино) is a rural locality (a village) in Vtorovskoye Rural Settlement, Kameshkovsky District, Vladimir Oblast, Russia. The population was 19 as of 2010.

== Geography ==
Pishchikhino is located 23 km southwest of Kameshkovo (the district's administrative centre) by road. Mirny is the nearest rural locality.
