= Leontyevo =

Leontyevo Леонтьево
- Village
- Location within Vladimir Oblast Location within Russia
- Coordinates: 56°12′N 40°50′E
- Country: Russia
- Region: Vladimir Oblast
- District: Kameshkovsky District
- Time zone: UTC+3:00

Leontyevo (Russian: Леонтьево) is a rural locality (a village) in Penkinskoye Rural Settlement, Kameshkovsky District, Vladimir Oblast, Russia. The population was 22 as of 2010.

== Geography ==
Leontyevo is located 25 km southwest of Kameshkovo (the district's administrative centre) by road. Dvoriki is the nearest rural locality.
