= Glazovo =

Glazovo Глазово
- Village
- Location within Vladimir Oblast Location within Russia
- Coordinates: 56°22′N 40°45′E
- Country: Russia
- Region: Vladimir Oblast
- District: Kameshkovsky District
- Time zone: UTC+3:00

Glazovo (Russian: Глазово) is a rural locality (a village) in Sergeikhinskoye Rural Settlement, Kameshkovsky District, Vladimir Oblast, Russia. The population was 7 as of 2010.

== Geography ==
Glazovo is located on the Pechuga River, 23 km northwest of Kameshkovo (the district's administrative centre) by road. Krutovo is the nearest rural locality.
