= Plyasitsyno =

Plyasitsyno Плясицыно
- Village
- Location within Vladimir Oblast Location within Russia
- Coordinates: 56°24′N 40°46′E
- Country: Russia
- Region: Vladimir Oblast
- District: Kameshkovsky District
- Time zone: UTC+3:00

Plyasitsyno (Russian: Плясицыно) is a rural locality (a village) in Sergeikhinskoye Rural Settlement, Kameshkovsky District, Vladimir Oblast, Russia. The population was 85 as of 2010.

== Geography ==
Plyasitsyno is located 18 km northwest of Kameshkovo (the district's administrative centre) by road. Sergeikha is the nearest rural locality.
