= Aksentsevo =

Aksentsevo Аксенцево
- Village
- Location within Vladimir Oblast Location within Russia
- Coordinates: 56°10′N 40°43′E
- Country: Russia
- Region: Vladimir Oblast
- District: Kameshkovsky District
- Time zone: UTC+3:00

Aksentsevo (Russian: Аксенцево) is a rural locality (a village) in Vtorovskoye Rural Settlement, Kameshkovsky District, Vladimir Oblast, Russia. The population was 73 as of 2010.

== Geography ==
Aksentsevo is located 29 km southwest of Kameshkovo (the district's administrative centre) by road. Novskoye is the nearest rural locality.
