= Pozharnitsy =

Pozharnitsy Пожарницы
- Village
- Location within Vladimir Oblast Location within Russia
- Coordinates: 56°11′N 40°51′E
- Country: Russia
- Region: Vladimir Oblast
- District: Kameshkovsky District
- Time zone: UTC+3:00

Pozharnitsy (Russian: Пожарницы) is a rural locality (a village) in Penkinskoye Rural Settlement, Kameshkovsky District, Vladimir Oblast, Russia. The population was 1 as of 2010.

== Geography ==
Pozharnitsy is located 24 km southwest of Kameshkovo (the district's administrative centre) by road. Dvoriki is the nearest rural locality.
