= Zauichye =

Zauichye Зауичье
- Village
- Location within Vladimir Oblast Location within Russia
- Coordinates: 56°21′N 40°43′E
- Country: Russia
- Region: Vladimir Oblast
- District: Kameshkovsky District
- Time zone: UTC+3:00

Zauichye (Russian: Зауичье) is a rural locality (a village) in Sergeikhinskoye Rural Settlement, Kameshkovsky District, Vladimir Oblast, Russia. The population was 7 as of 2010.

== Geography ==
Zauichye is located on the Uyechka River, 23 km west of Kameshkovo (the district's administrative centre) by road. Pigasovo is the nearest rural locality.
