= Kruglovo, Kameshkovsky District, Vladimir Oblast =

Kruglovo Круглово
- Selo
- Location within Vladimir Oblast Location within Russia
- Coordinates: 56°20′N 40°41′E
- Country: Russia
- Region: Vladimir Oblast
- District: Kameshkovsky District
- Time zone: UTC+3:00

Kruglovo (Russian: Круглово) is a rural locality (a selo) in Sergeikhinskoye Rural Settlement, Kameshkovsky District, Vladimir Oblast, Russia. The population was 51 as of 2010.

== Geography ==
Kruglovo is located 20 km west of Kameshkovo (the district's administrative centre) by road. Pigasovo is the nearest rural locality.
