= Terekhovitsy =

Terekhovitsy Тереховицы
- Village
- Location within Vladimir Oblast Location within Russia
- Coordinates: 56°19′N 40°56′E
- Country: Russia
- Region: Vladimir Oblast
- District: Kameshkovsky District
- Time zone: UTC+3:00

Terekhovitsy (Russian: Тереховицы) is a rural locality (a village) in Vtorovskoye Rural Settlement, Kameshkovsky District, Vladimir Oblast, Russia. The population was 126 as of 2010.

== Geography ==
Terekhovitsy is located 6 km southwest of Kameshkovo (the district's administrative centre) by road. Kameshkovo is the nearest rural locality.
