= Pridorozhny, Vladimir Oblast =

Pridorozhny Придорожный
- Settlement
- Location within Vladimir Oblast Location within Russia
- Coordinates: 56°23′N 41°03′E
- Country: Russia
- Region: Vladimir Oblast
- District: Kameshkovsky District
- Time zone: UTC+3:00

Pridorozhny (Russian: Придорожный) is a rural locality (a settlement) in Bryzgalovskoye Rural Settlement, Kameshkovsky District, Vladimir Oblast, Russia. The population was 11 as of 2010.

== Geography ==
Pridorozhny is located 9 km northeast of Kameshkovo (the district's administrative centre) by road. Dmitriyevsky pogost is the nearest rural locality.
