= Edemskoye =

Edemskoye Эдемское
- Selo
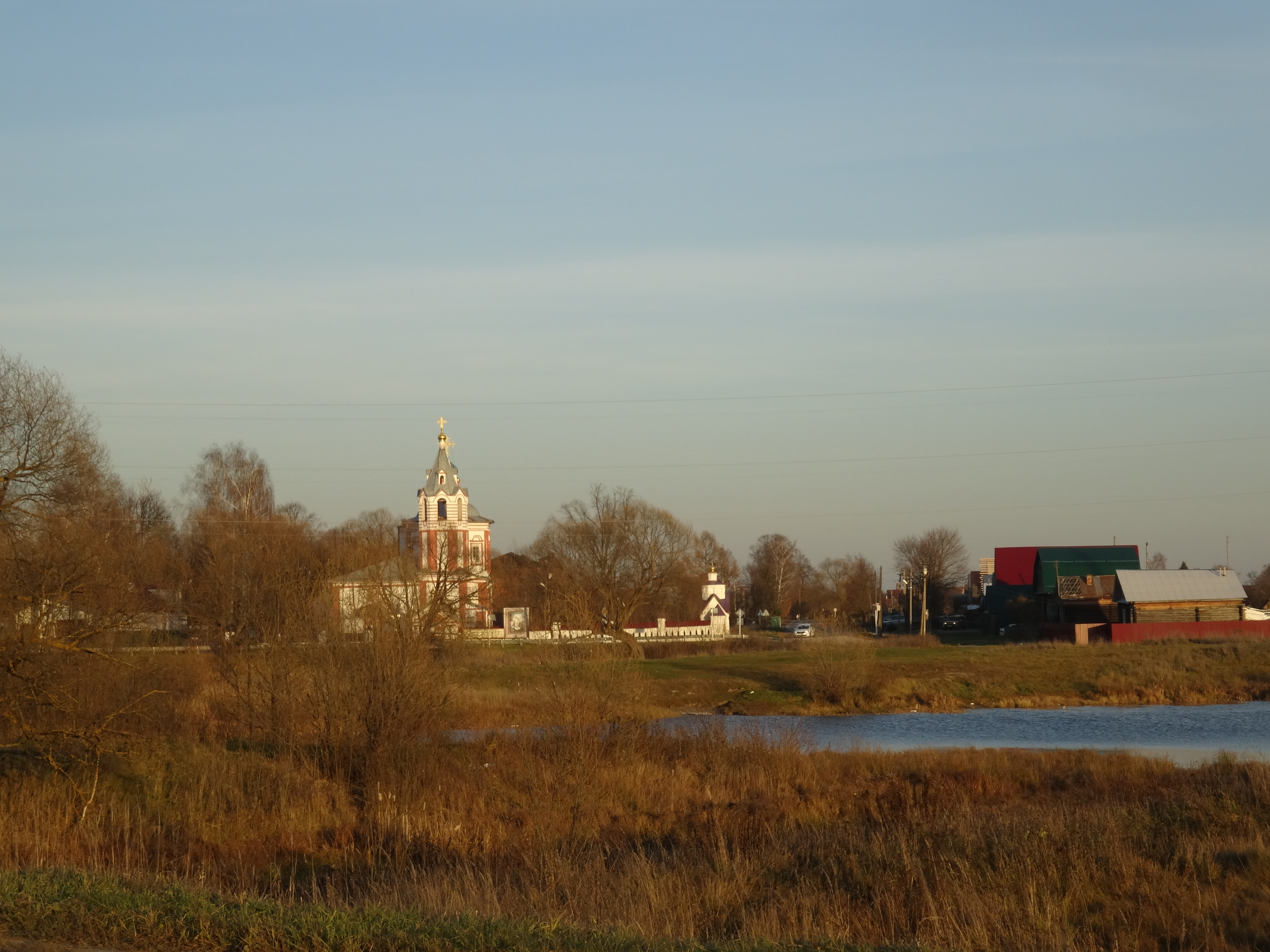

- Location within Vladimir Oblast Location within Russia
- Coordinates: 56°22′N 41°02′E
- Country: Russia
- Region: Vladimir Oblast
- District: Kameshkovsky District
- Time zone: UTC+3:00

Edemskoye (Russian: Эдемское) is a rural locality (a selo) in Bryzgalovskoye Rural Settlement, Kameshkovsky District, Vladimir Oblast, Russia. The population was 233 as of 2010.

== Geography ==
Edemskoye is located 5 km northeast of Kameshkovo (the district's administrative centre) by road. Druzhba is the nearest rural locality.
