= Mokeyevo, Kameshkovsky District, Vladimir Oblast =

Mokeyevo Мокеево
- Village
- Location within Vladimir Oblast Location within Russia
- Coordinates: 56°11′N 40°46′E
- Country: Russia
- Region: Vladimir Oblast
- District: Kameshkovsky District
- Time zone: UTC+3:00

Mokeyevo (Russian: Мокеево) is a rural locality (a village) in Vtorovskoye Rural Settlement, Kameshkovsky District, Vladimir Oblast, Russia. The population was 33 as of 2010.

== Geography ==
Mokeyevo is located 26 km southeast of Kameshkovo (the district's administrative centre) by road. Vorynino is the nearest rural locality.
