= Andreytsevo =

Andreytsevo Андрейцево
- Village
- Location within Vladimir Oblast Location within Russia
- Coordinates: 56°13′N 40°51′E
- Country: Russia
- Region: Vladimir Oblast
- District: Kameshkovsky District
- Time zone: UTC+3:00

Andreytsevo (Russian: Андрейцево) is a rural locality (a village) in Penkinskoye Rural Settlement, Kameshkovsky District, Vladimir Oblast, Russia. The population was 2 as of 2010.

== Geography ==
Andreytsevo is located 23 km southwest of Kameshkovo (the district's administrative centre) by road. Yuryatino is the nearest rural locality.
