= Novaya Bykovka =

Novaya Bykovka Новая Быковка
- Village
- Location within Vladimir Oblast Location within Russia
- Coordinates: 56°12′N 40°40′E
- Country: Russia
- Region: Vladimir Oblast
- District: Kameshkovsky District
- Time zone: UTC+3:00

Novaya Bykovka (Russian: Новая Быковка) is a rural locality (a village) in Vtorovskoye Rural Settlement, Kameshkovsky District, Vladimir Oblast, Russia. The population was 252 as of 2010. There are 2 streets.

== Geography ==
Novaya Bykovka is located 29 km southwest of Kameshkovo (the district's administrative centre) by road. Lesnoy is the nearest rural locality.
