= Dmitrikovo =

Dmitrikovo Дмитриково
- Village
- Location within Vladimir Oblast Location within Russia
- Coordinates: 56°20′N 40°43′E
- Country: Russia
- Region: Vladimir Oblast
- District: Kameshkovsky District
- Time zone: UTC+3:00

Dmitrikovo (Russian: Дмитриково) is a rural locality (a village) in Sergeikhinskoye Rural Settlement, Kameshkovsky District, Vladimir Oblast, Russia. The population was 19 as of 2010.

== Geography ==
Dmitrikovo is located on the Pechuga River, 18 km west of Kameshkovo (the district's administrative centre) by road. Zauichye is the nearest rural locality.
