= Synkovo =

Synkovo Сынково
- Village
- Location within Vladimir Oblast Location within Russia
- Coordinates: 56°12′N 40°48′E
- Country: Russia
- Region: Vladimir Oblast
- District: Kameshkovsky District
- Time zone: UTC+3:00

Synkovo (Russian: Сынково) is a rural locality (a village) in Penkinskoye Rural Settlement, Kameshkovsky District, Vladimir Oblast, Russia. The population was 1 as of 2010.

== Geography ==
Synkovo is located 28 km southwest of Kameshkovo (the district's administrative centre) by road. Borodino is the nearest rural locality.
