= Vorynino =

Vorynino Ворынино
- Village
- Location within Vladimir Oblast Location within Russia
- Coordinates: 56°11′N 40°45′E
- Country: Russia
- Region: Vladimir Oblast
- District: Kameshkovsky District
- Time zone: UTC+3:00

Vorynino (Russian: Ворынино) is a rural locality (a village) in Vtorovskoye Rural Settlement, Kameshkovsky District, Vladimir Oblast, Russia. The population was 2 as of 2010.

== Geography ==
Vorynino is located 26 km southwest of Kameshkovo (the district's administrative centre) by road. Gorki is the nearest rural locality.
