= Laptevo =

Laptevo Лаптево
- Selo
- Location within Vladimir Oblast Location within Russia
- Coordinates: 56°13′N 40°46′E
- Country: Russia
- Region: Vladimir Oblast
- District: Kameshkovsky District
- Time zone: UTC+3:00

Laptevo (Russian: Лаптево) is a rural locality (a selo) in Vtorovskoye Rural Settlement, Kameshkovsky District, Vladimir Oblast, Russia. The population was 101 as of 2010. There is one street.

== Geography ==
Laptevo is located 21 km southwest of Kameshkovo (the district's administrative centre) by road. Bliznino is the nearest rural locality.
