= Posyolok imeni Frunze =

Posyolok imeni Frunze Посёлок имени Фрунзе
- Settlement
- Location within Vladimir Oblast Location within Russia
- Coordinates: 56°19′N 40°43′E
- Country: Russia
- Region: Vladimir Oblast
- District: Kameshkovsky District
- Time zone: UTC+3:00

Posyolok imeni Frunze (Russian: Посёлок имени Фрунзе) is a rural locality (a settlement) in Sergeikhinskoye Rural Settlement, Kameshkovsky District, Vladimir Oblast, Russia. The population was 64 as of 2010.

== Geography ==
The settlement is located on the Pechuga River, 23 km west of Kameshkovo (the district's administrative centre) by road. Kruglovo is the nearest rural locality.
