= Staraya Nikola =

Staraya Nikola Старая Никола
- Pogost
- Location within Vladimir Oblast Location within Russia
- Coordinates: 56°29′N 40°58′E
- Country: Russia
- Region: Vladimir Oblast
- District: Kameshkovsky District
- Time zone: UTC+3:00

Staraya Nikola (Russian: Старая Никола) is a rural locality (a pogost) in Vakhromeyevskoye Rural Settlement, Kameshkovsky District, Vladimir Oblast, Russia. The population was 11 as of 2010.

== Geography ==
The village is located 2 km north from Posyolok imeni Gorkogo, 17 km north from Kameshkovo.
