= Palashkino =

Palashkino Палашкино
- Selo
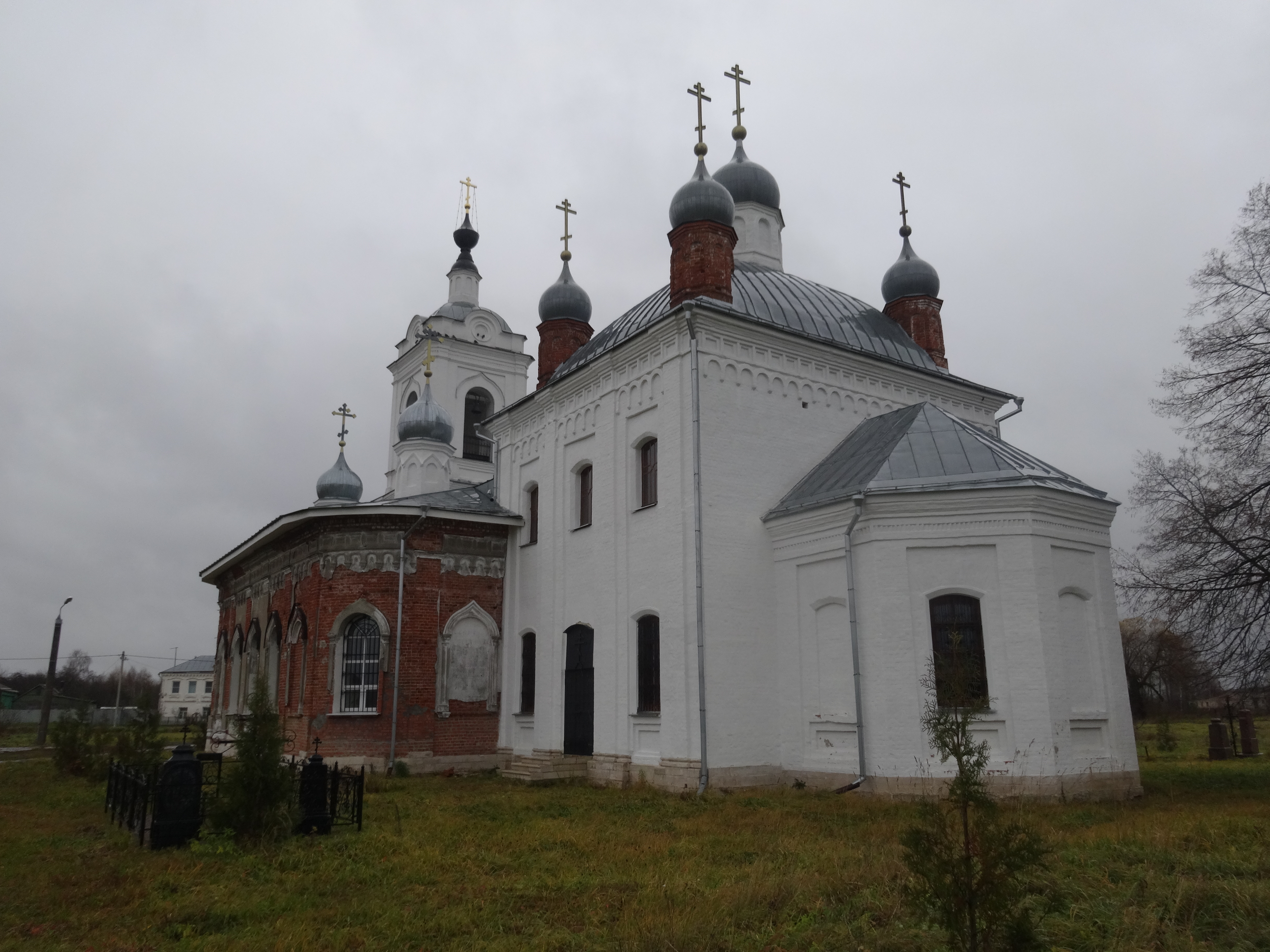

- Location within Vladimir Oblast Location within Russia
- Coordinates: 56°16′N 40°41′E
- Country: Russia
- Region: Vladimir Oblast
- District: Kameshkovsky District
- Time zone: UTC+3:00

Palashkino (Russian: Палашкино) is a rural locality (a selo) in Vtorovskoye Rural Settlement, Kameshkovsky District, Vladimir Oblast, Russia. The population was 38 as of 2010. There is 1 street.

== Geography ==
Palashkino is located 28 km southwest of Kameshkovo (the district's administrative centre) by road. Chistukha is the nearest rural locality.
