= Semenigino =

Semenigino Семенигино
- Village
- Location within Vladimir Oblast Location within Russia
- Coordinates: 56°30′N 40°58′E
- Country: Russia
- Region: Vladimir Oblast
- District: Kameshkovsky District
- Time zone: UTC+3:00

Semenigino (Russian: Семенигино) is a rural locality (a village) in Vakhromeyevskoye Rural Settlement, Kameshkovsky District, Vladimir Oblast, Russia. The population was 16 as of 2010.

== Geography ==
Semenigino is located 22 km north of Kameshkovo (the district's administrative centre) by road. Mikshino is the nearest rural locality.
