= Novaya Zarya, Vladimir Oblast =

Novaya Zarya Новая Заря
- Settlement
- Location within Vladimir Oblast Location within Russia
- Coordinates: 56°23′N 40°45′E
- Country: Russia
- Region: Vladimir Oblast
- District: Kameshkovsky District
- Time zone: UTC+3:00

Novaya Zarya (Russian: Новая Заря) is a rural locality (a settlement) in Sergeikhinskoye Rural Settlement, Kameshkovsky District, Vladimir Oblast, Russia. The population was 79 as of 2010.

== Geography ==
Novaya Zarya is located on the Pechuga River, 21 km northwest of Kameshkovo (the district's administrative centre) by road. Novosyolka is the nearest rural locality.
