= Serebrovo =

Serebrovo Сереброво
- Village
- Location within Vladimir Oblast Location within Russia
- Coordinates: 56°27′N 41°03′E
- Country: Russia
- Region: Vladimir Oblast
- District: Kameshkovsky District
- Time zone: UTC+3:00

Serebrovo (Russian: Сереброво) is a rural locality (a village) in Bryzgalovskoye Rural Settlement, Kameshkovsky District, Vladimir Oblast, Russia. The population was 96 as of 2010.

== Geography ==
Serebrovo is located 17 km northeast of Kameshkovo (the district's administrative centre) by road. Imeni Kirova is the nearest rural locality.
