= Tyntsy =

Tyntsy Тынцы
- Selo
- Location within Vladimir Oblast Location within Russia
- Coordinates: 56°26′N 40°53′E
- Country: Russia
- Region: Vladimir Oblast
- District: Kameshkovsky District
- Time zone: UTC+3:00

Tyntsy (Russian: Тынцы) is a rural locality (a selo) in Vakhromeyevskoye Rural Settlement, Kameshkovsky District, Vladimir Oblast, Russia. The population was 148 as of 2010. There are 3 streets.

== Geography ==
Tyntsy is located 18 km north of Kameshkovo (the district's administrative centre) by road. Ryabinovka is the nearest rural locality.
