= Gorki (village), Kameshkovsky District, Vladimir Oblast =

Gorki Горки
- Village
- Location within Vladimir Oblast Location within Russia
- Coordinates: 56°17′N 41°00′E
- Country: Russia
- Region: Vladimir Oblast
- District: Kameshkovsky District
- Time zone: UTC+3:00

Gorki (Russian: Горки) is a rural locality (a village) in Vtorovskoye Rural Settlement, Kameshkovsky District, Vladimir Oblast, Russia. The population was 61 as of 2010.

== Geography ==
Gorki is located 27 km southwest of Kameshkovo (the district's administrative centre) by road. Vorynino is the nearest rural locality.
