= Sergeikha =

Russian village

Sergeikha Сергеиха
- Village
- Location within Vladimir Oblast Location within Russia
- Coordinates: 56°25′N 40°45′E
- Country: Russia
- Region: Vladimir Oblast
- District: Kameshkovsky District
- Time zone: UTC+3:00

Sergeikha (Russian: Сергеиха) is a rural locality (a village) and the administrative center of Sergeikhinskoye Rural Settlement, Kameshkovsky District, Vladimir Oblast, Russia. The population was 902 as of 2010. There are 6 streets.

== Geography ==
Sergeikha is located 20 km northwest of Kameshkovo (the district's administrative centre) by road. Plyasitsyno is the nearest rural locality.
