= Ryakhovo =

Ryakhovo Ряхово
- Selo
- Location within Vladimir Oblast Location within Russia
- Coordinates: 56°25′N 40°48′E
- Country: Russia
- Region: Vladimir Oblast
- District: Kameshkovsky District
- Time zone: UTC+3:00

Ryakhovo (Russian: Ряхово) is a rural locality (a selo) in Sergeikhinskoye Rural Settlement, Kameshkovsky District, Vladimir Oblast, Russia. The population was 35 as of 2010.

== Geography ==
Ryakhovo is located 18 km northwest of Kameshkovo (the district's administrative centre) by road. Saulovo is the nearest rural locality.
