= Berkovo, Vladimir Oblast =

Berkovo Берково
- Village
- Location within Vladimir Oblast Location within Russia
- Coordinates: 56°20′N 40°58′E
- Country: Russia
- Region: Vladimir Oblast
- District: Kameshkovsky District
- Time zone: UTC+3:00

Berkovo (Russian: Берково) is a rural locality (a village) in Vtorovskoye Rural Settlement, Kameshkovsky District, Vladimir Oblast, Russia. The population was 187 as of 2010.

== Geography ==
Berkovo is located 3 km southwest of Kameshkovo (the district's administrative centre) by road. Kameshkovo is the nearest rural locality.
