= Dvoriki, Kameshkovsky District, Vladimir Oblast =

Dvoriki Дворики
- Village
- Location within Vladimir Oblast Location within Russia
- Coordinates: 56°11′N 40°50′E
- Country: Russia
- Region: Vladimir Oblast
- District: Kameshkovsky District
- Time zone: UTC+3:00

Dvoriki (Russian: Дворики) is a rural locality (a village) in Penkinskoye Rural Settlement, Kameshkovsky District, Vladimir Oblast, Russia. The population was 35 as of 2010.

== Geography ==
Dvoriki is located 24 km southwest of Kameshkovo (the district's administrative centre) by road. Pozharnitsy is the nearest rural locality.
