= Mostsy =

Mostsy Мостцы
- Selo
- Location within Vladimir Oblast Location within Russia
- Coordinates: 56°15′N 40°55′E
- Country: Russia
- Region: Vladimir Oblast
- District: Kameshkovsky District
- Time zone: UTC+3:00

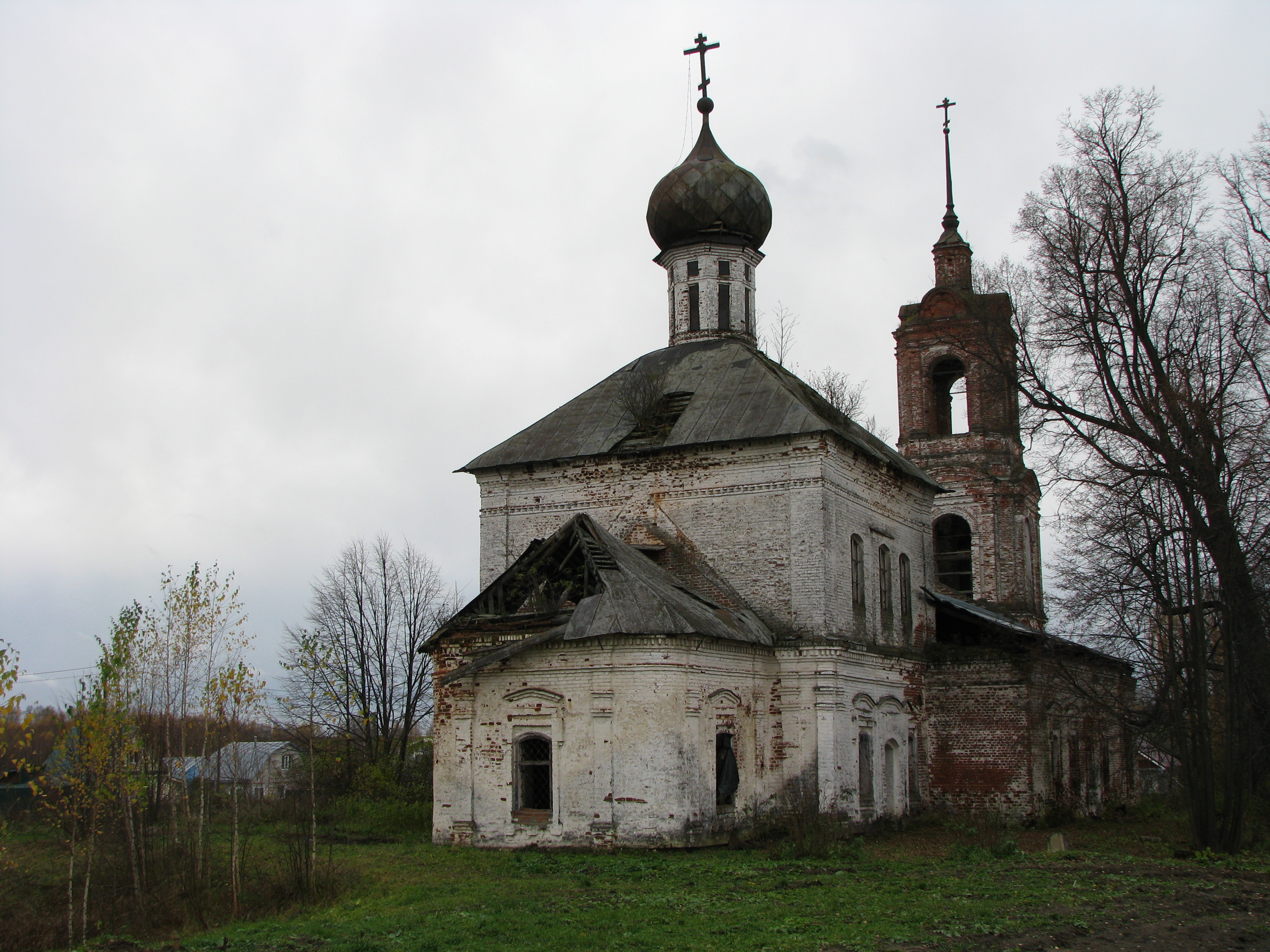
Church of the Entry of the Virgin Mary into the Temple: Mostsy, Kamenskovsky District, Vladimir Region

Mostsy (Russian: Мостцы) is a rural locality (a selo) in Vtorovskoye Rural Settlement, Kameshkovsky District, Vladimir Oblast, Russia. The population was 22 as of 2010.

== Geography ==
Mostsy is located 16 km southwest of Kameshkovo (the district's administrative centre) by road. Kizhany is the nearest rural locality.
