= Ivishenye =

Ivishenye Ивишенье
- Village
- Location within Vladimir Oblast Location within Russia
- Coordinates: 56°29′N 40°55′E
- Country: Russia
- Region: Vladimir Oblast
- District: Kameshkovsky District
- Time zone: UTC+3:00

Ivishenye (Russian: Ивишенье) is a rural locality (a village) in Vakhromeyevskoye Rural Settlement, Kameshkovsky District, Vladimir Oblast, Russia. The population was 35 as of 2010.

== Geography ==
Ivishenye is located 22 km (14 mi) north of Kameshkovo (the district's administrative centre) by road. Mikshino is the nearest rural locality.
