= Kolosovo =

Kolosovo Колосово
- Village
- Location within Vladimir Oblast Location within Russia
- Coordinates: 56°28′N 40°55′E
- Country: Russia
- Region: Vladimir Oblast
- District: Kameshkovsky District
- Time zone: UTC+3:00

Kolosovo (Russian: Колосово) is a rural locality (a village) in Vakhromeyevskoye Rural Settlement, Kameshkovsky District, Vladimir Oblast, Russia. The population was 47 as of 2010. It is surrounded by other rural villages, and its location is part of the typical farming and forest landscape of central Russia.

== Geography ==
Kolosovo is located 19 km north of Kameshkovo (the district's administrative centre) by road. Vakhromeyevo is the nearest rural locality.
