= Gatikha =

Gatikha Гатиха
- Selo
- Location within Vladimir Oblast Location within Russia
- Coordinates: 56°12′N 40°51′E
- Country: Russia
- Region: Vladimir Oblast
- District: Kameshkovsky District
- Time zone: UTC+3:00

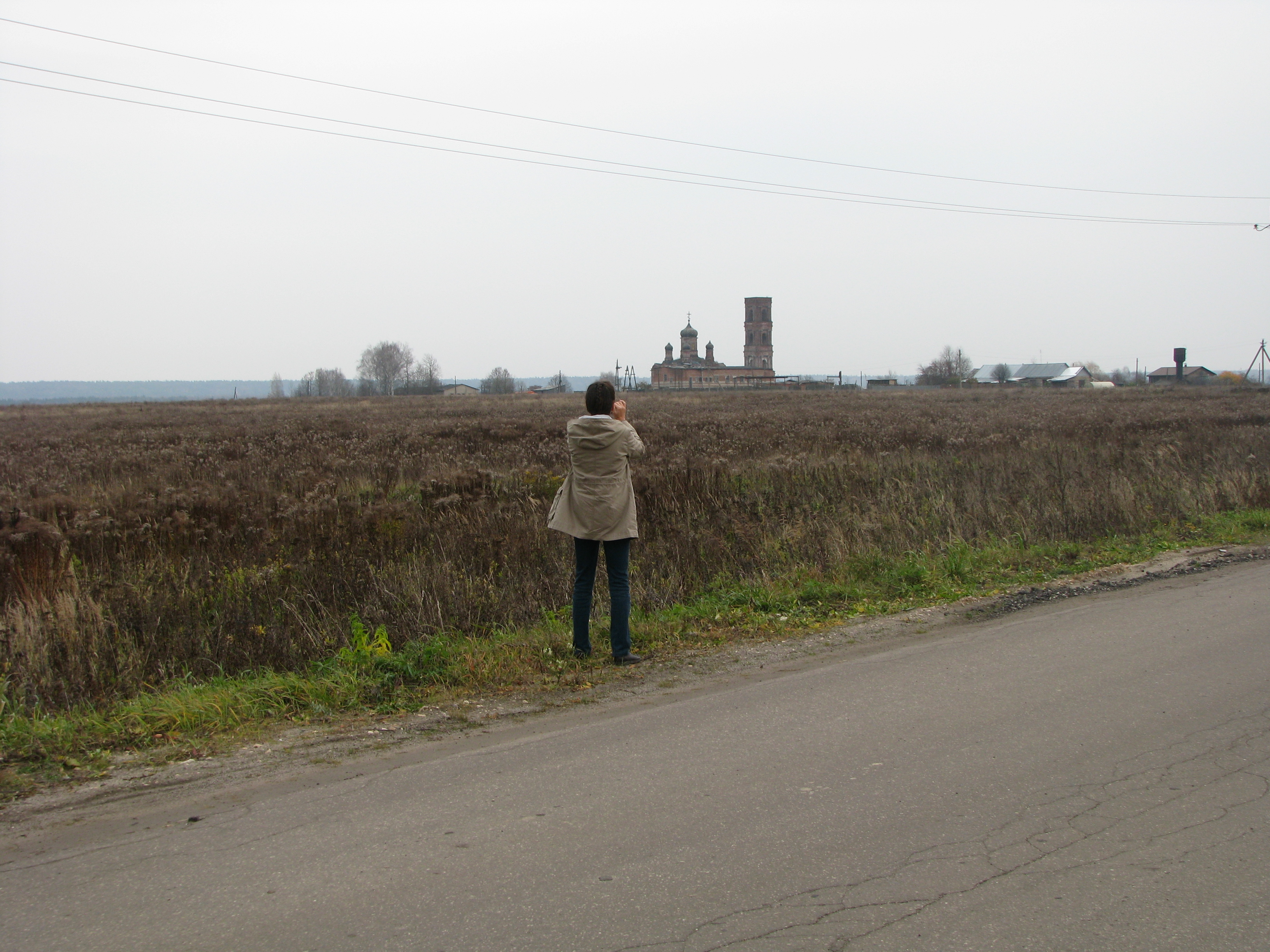
Church of the Georgian Icon of the Mother of God: Gatikha, Kamenskovsky District, Vladimir Region

Gatikha (Russian: Гатиха) is a rural locality (a selo) in Penkinskoye Rural Settlement, Kameshkovsky District, Vladimir Oblast, Russia. The population was 693 as of 2010. There are 5 streets.

== Geography ==
Gatikha is located 22 km southwest of Kameshkovo (the district's administrative centre) by road. Leontyevo is the nearest rural locality.
