= Arefino, Kameshkovsky District, Vladimir Oblast =

Arefino Арефино
- Village
- Location within Vladimir Oblast Location within Russia
- Coordinates: 56°28′N 41°01′E
- Country: Russia
- Region: Vladimir Oblast
- District: Kameshkovsky District
- Time zone: UTC+3:00

Arefino (Russian: Арефино) is a rural locality (a village) in Vakhromeyevskoye Rural Settlement, Kameshkovsky District, Vladimir Oblast, Russia. The population was 38 as of 2010.

== Geography ==
Arefino is located 22 km north of Kameshkovo (the district's administrative centre) by road. Ruchkino is the nearest rural locality.
