= Posyolok imeni Artyoma =

Posyolok imeni Artyoma Посёлок имени Артёма
- Settlement
- Location within Vladimir Oblast Location within Russia
- Coordinates: 56°21′N 40°55′E
- Country: Russia
- Region: Vladimir Oblast
- District: Kameshkovsky District
- Time zone: UTC+3:00

Posyolok imeni Artyoma (Russian: Посёлок имени Артёма) is a rural locality (a settlement) in Sergeikhinskoye Rural Settlement, Kameshkovsky District, Vladimir Oblast, Russia. The population was 366 as of 2010. There are 7 streets.

== Geography ==
The settlement is located 5 km west of Kameshkovo (the district's administrative centre) by road. Ostrov is the nearest rural locality.
