= Simonovo, Vladimir Oblast =

Simonovo Симоново
- Village
- Location within Vladimir Oblast Location within Russia
- Coordinates: 56°13′N 40°56′E
- Country: Russia
- Region: Vladimir Oblast
- District: Kameshkovsky District
- Time zone: UTC+3:00

Simonovo (Russian: Симоново) is a rural locality (a village) in Penkinskoye Rural Settlement, Kameshkovsky District, Vladimir Oblast, Russia. The population was 25 as of 2010.

== Geography ==
Simonovo is located 32 km south of Kameshkovo (the district's administrative centre) by road. Lubenkino is the nearest rural locality.
