= Filyandino =

Filyandino Филяндино
- Village
- Location within Vladimir Oblast Location within Russia
- Coordinates: 56°10′N 40°42′E
- Country: Russia
- Region: Vladimir Oblast
- District: Kameshkovsky District
- Time zone: UTC+3:00

Filyandino (Russian: Филяндино) is a rural locality (a village) in Vtorovskoye Rural Settlement, Kameshkovsky District, Vladimir Oblast, Russia. The population was 216 as of 2010.

== Geography ==
Filyandino is located 30 km southwest of Kameshkovo (the district's administrative centre) by road. Davydovo is the nearest rural locality.
