= Posyolok imeni Gorkogo =

Posyolok imeni Gorkogo Посёлок имени Горького
- Settlement
- Location within Vladimir Oblast Location within Russia
- Coordinates: 56°28′N 40°57′E
- Country: Russia
- Region: Vladimir Oblast
- District: Kameshkovsky District
- Time zone: UTC+3:00

Posyolok imeni Gorkogo (Russian: Посёлок имени Горького) is a rural locality (a settlement) and the administrative center of Vakhromeyevskoye Rural Settlement, Kameshkovsky District, Vladimir Oblast, Russia. The population was 2,342 as of 2010. There are 17 streets.

== Geography ==
The settlement is located 18 km north of Kameshkovo (the district's administrative centre) by road. Vakhromeyevo is the nearest rural locality.
