= Vysokovo, Kameshkovsky District, Vladimir Oblast =

Vysokovo Высоково
- Village
- Location within Vladimir Oblast Location within Russia
- Coordinates: 56°16′N 40°52′E
- Country: Russia
- Region: Vladimir Oblast
- District: Kameshkovsky District
- Time zone: UTC+3:00

Vysokovo (Russian: Высоково) is a rural locality (a village) in Vtorovskoye Rural Settlement, Kameshkovsky District, Vladimir Oblast, Russia. The population was 52 as of 2010.

== Geography ==
Vysokovo is located 13 km southwest of Kameshkovo (the district's administrative centre) by road. Kunitsyno is the nearest rural locality.
