= Fomikha =

Fomikha Фомиха
- Selo
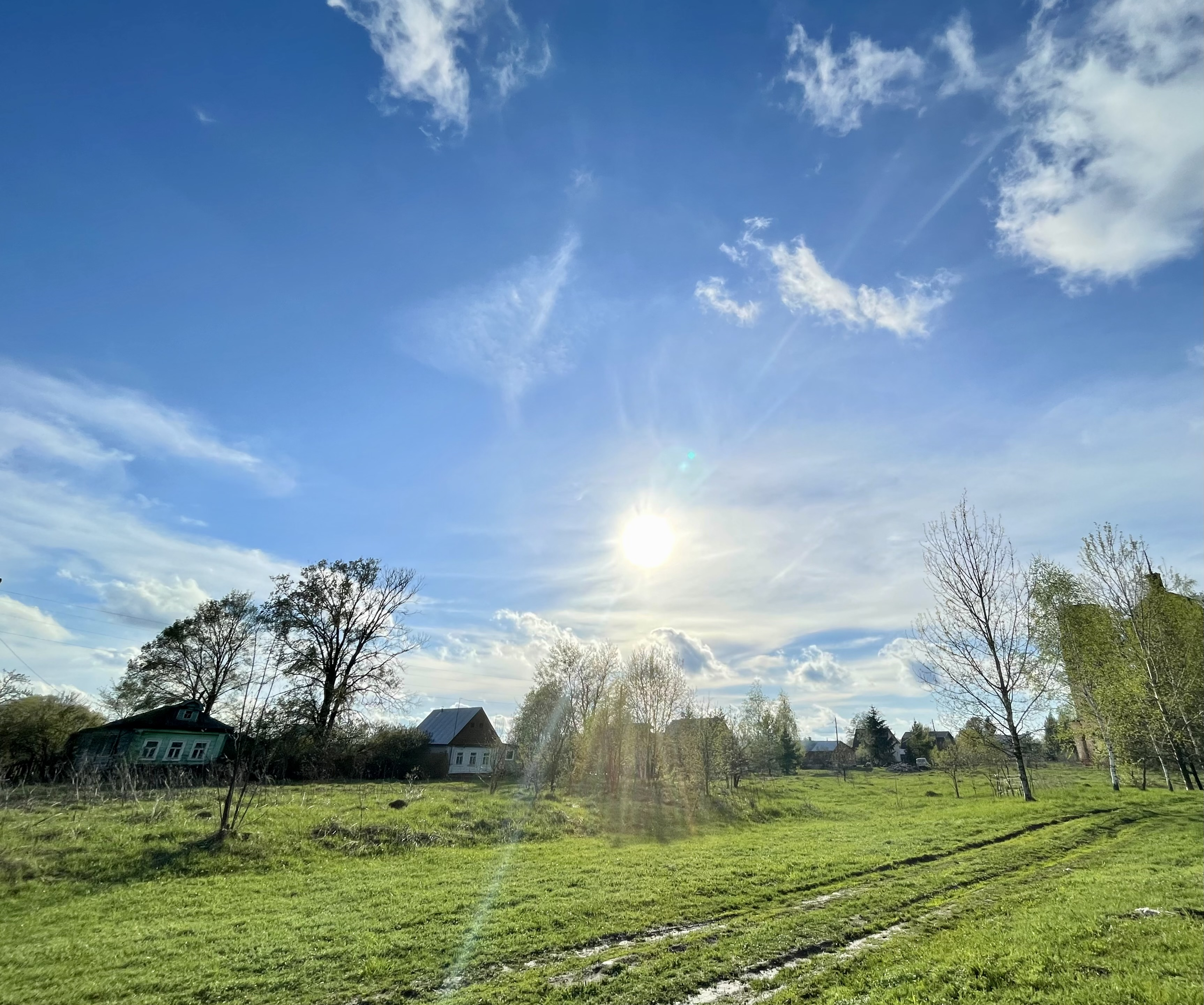
- rural village

- Location within Vladimir Oblast Location within Russia
- Coordinates: 56°20′N 40°37′E
- Country: Russia
- Region: Vladimir Oblast
- District: Kameshkovsky District
- Time zone: UTC+3:00

Fomikha (Russian: Фомиха) is a rural locality (a selo) in Sergeikhinskoye Rural Settlement, Kameshkovsky District, Vladimir Oblast, Russia. The population was 14 as of 2010.

== Geography ==
Fomikha is located on the Nerl River, 27 km west of Kameshkovo (the district's administrative centre) by road. Zapolitsy is the nearest rural locality.
