= Novaya Pechuga =

Novaya Pechuga Новая Печуга
- Village
- Location within Vladimir Oblast Location within Russia
- Coordinates: 56°23′N 40°44′E
- Country: Russia
- Region: Vladimir Oblast
- District: Kameshkovsky District
- Time zone: UTC+3:00

Novaya Pechuga (Russian: Новая Печуга) is a rural locality (a village) in Sergeikhinskoye Rural Settlement, Kameshkovsky District, Vladimir Oblast, Russia. As of 2010, the population was 177.

== Geography ==
Novaya Pechuga is located 20 kilometres (12 mi) northwest of Kameshkovo (the district's administrative centre) by road. Lubentsy is the nearest rural locality.
