= Simakovo =

Simakovo Симаково
- Village
- Location within Vladimir Oblast Location within Russia
- Coordinates: 56°26′N 40°55′E
- Country: Russia
- Region: Vladimir Oblast
- District: Kameshkovsky District
- Time zone: UTC+3:00

Simakovo (Russian: Симаково) is a rural locality (a village) in Vakhromeyevskoye Rural Settlement, Kameshkovsky District, Vladimir Oblast, Russia. The population was 118 as of 2010.

== Geography ==
Simakovo is located 15 km north of Kameshkovo (the district's administrative centre) by road. Imeni Krasina is the nearest rural locality.
