= Posyolok imeni Karla Marksa =

Posyolok imeni Karla Marksa Посёлок имени Карла Маркса
- Settlement
- Location within Vladimir Oblast Location within Russia
- Coordinates: 56°24′N 41°05′E
- Country: Russia
- Region: Vladimir Oblast
- District: Kameshkovsky District
- Time zone: UTC+3:00

Posyolok imeni Karla Marksa (Russian: Посёлок имени Карла Маркса) is a rural locality (a settlement) and the administrative center of Bryzgalovskoye Rural Settlement, Kameshkovsky District, Vladimir Oblast, Russia. The population was 1,434 as of 2010. There are 16 streets.

== Geography ==
The settlement is located on the Naromsha River, 12 km northeast of Kameshkovo (the district's administrative centre) by road. Bryzgalovo is the nearest rural locality.
