= Kunitsyno =

Kunitsyno Куницыно
- Village
- Location within Vladimir Oblast Location within Russia
- Coordinates: 56°16′N 40°53′E
- Country: Russia
- Region: Vladimir Oblast
- District: Kameshkovsky District
- Time zone: UTC+3:00

Kunitsyno (Russian: Куницыно) is a rural locality (a village) in Vtorovskoye Rural Settlement, Kameshkovsky District, Vladimir Oblast, Russia. The population was 18 as of 2010.

== Geography ==
Kunitsyno is located 13 km southwest of Kameshkovo (the district's administrative centre) by road. Vysokovo is the nearest rural locality.
