= Patakino =

Patakino Патакино
- Selo
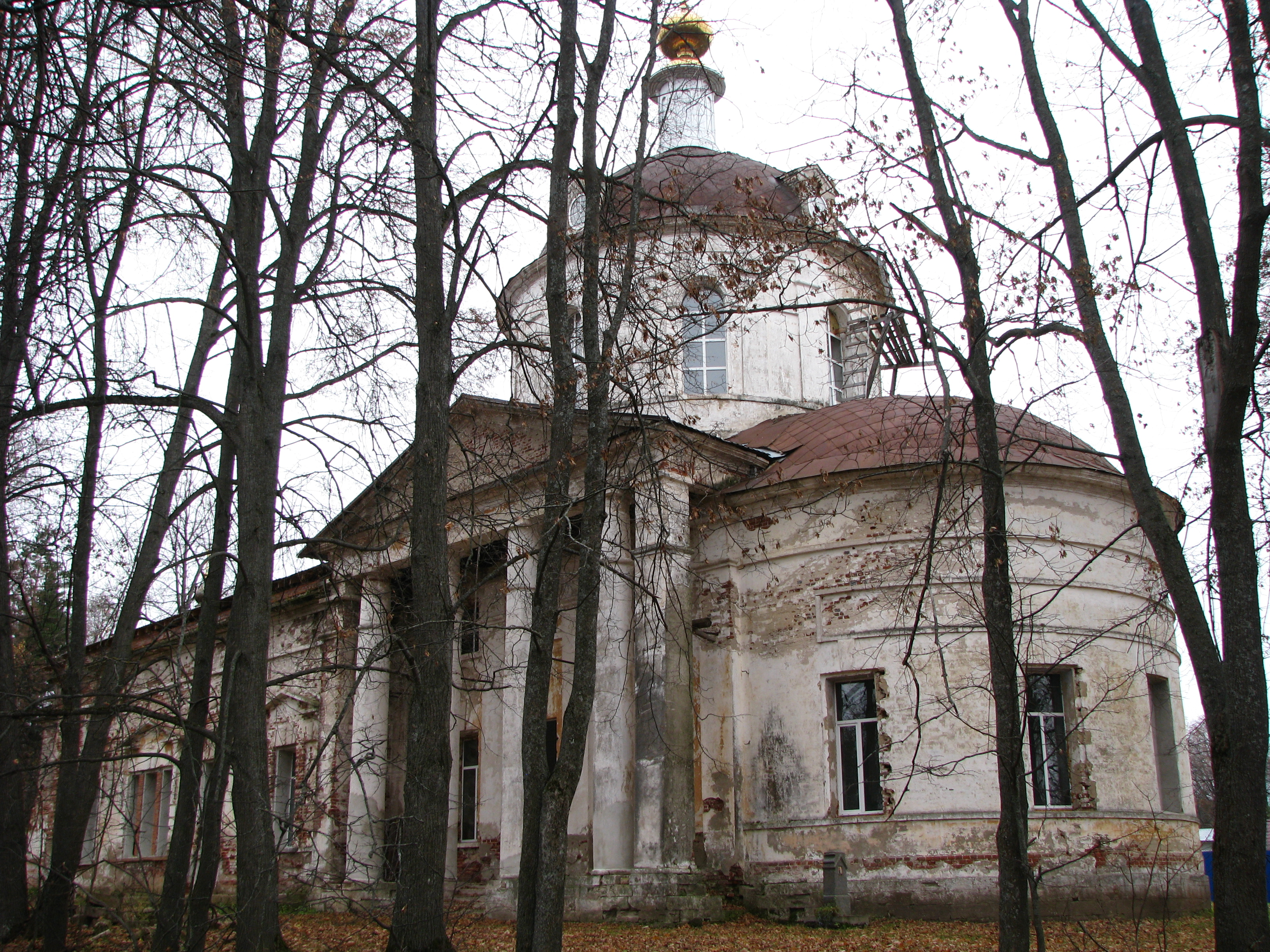
- Patakino Church

- Location within Vladimir Oblast Location within Russia
- Coordinates: 56°16′N 40°54′E
- Country: Russia
- Region: Vladimir Oblast
- District: Kameshkovsky District
- Time zone: UTC+3:00

Patakino (Russian: Патакино) is a rural locality (a selo) in Vtorovskoye Rural Settlement, Kameshkovsky District, Vladimir Oblast, Russia. The population was 137 as of 2010. There are 2 streets.

== Geography ==
Patakino is located on the Klyazma River, 15 km southwest of Kameshkovo (the district's administrative centre) by road. Mostsy is the nearest rural locality.
