= Karyakino, Vladimir Oblast =

Karyakino Карякино
- Village
- Location within Vladimir Oblast Location within Russia
- Coordinates: 56°14′N 40°42′E
- Country: Russia
- Region: Vladimir Oblast
- District: Kameshkovsky District
- Time zone: UTC+3:00

Karyakino (Russian: Карякино) is a rural locality (a village) in Vtorovskoye Rural Settlement, Kameshkovsky District, Vladimir Oblast, Russia. The population was 21 as of 2010.

== Geography ==
Karyakino is located 34 km southwest of Kameshkovo (the district's administrative centre) by road. Nesterkovo is the nearest rural locality.
