= Usolye, Vladimir Oblast =

Usolye Усолье
- Selo
- Location within Vladimir Oblast Location within Russia
- Coordinates: 56°27′N 41°05′E
- Country: Russia
- Region: Vladimir Oblast
- District: Kameshkovsky District
- Time zone: UTC+3:00

Usolye (Russian: Усолье) is a rural locality (a selo) in Bryzgalovskoye Rural Settlement, Kameshkovsky District, Vladimir Oblast, Russia. The population was 51 as of 2010.

== Geography ==
Usolye is located on the Uvod River, 21 km northeast of Kameshkovo (the district's administrative centre) by road. Serebrovo is the nearest rural locality.
