= Shukhurdino =

Shukhurdino Шухурдино
- Village
- Location within Vladimir Oblast Location within Russia
- Coordinates: 56°25′N 41°02′E
- Country: Russia
- Region: Vladimir Oblast
- District: Kameshkovsky District
- Time zone: UTC+3:00

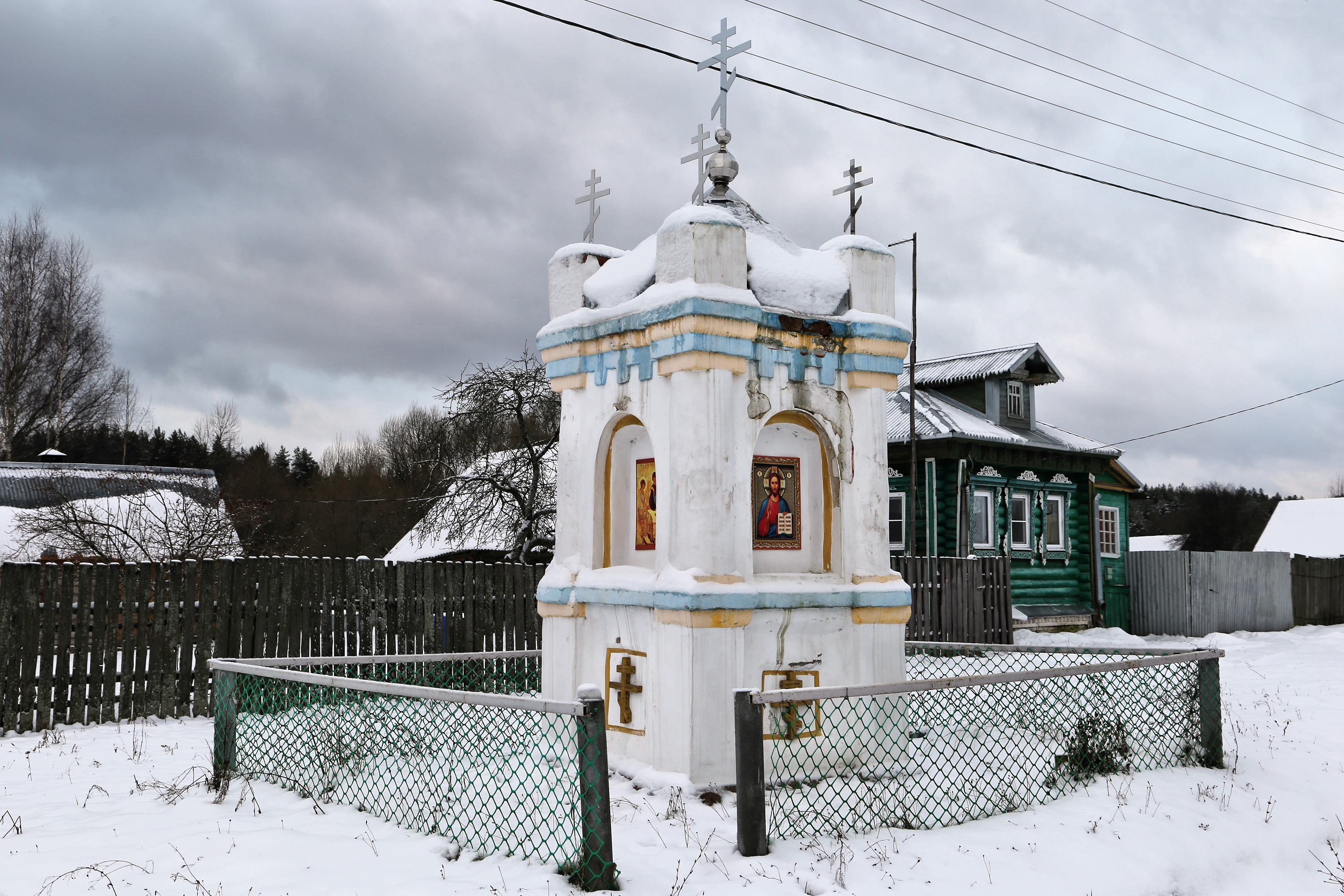
Chapel-pillar: village center, Shukhurdino, Kamenskovsky district, Vladimir region

Shukhurdino (Russian: Шухурдино) is a rural locality (a village) in Bryzgalovskoye Rural Settlement, Kameshkovsky District, Vladimir Oblast, Russia. The population was 42 as of 2010.

== Geography ==
Shukhurdino is located 12 km north of Kameshkovo (the district's administrative centre) by road. Abrosimovo is the nearest rural locality.
