= Krasnoramenye =

Krasnoramenye Краснораменье
- Village
- Location within Vladimir Oblast Location within Russia
- Coordinates: 56°10′N 40°53′E
- Country: Russia
- Region: Vladimir Oblast
- District: Kameshkovsky District
- Time zone: UTC+3:00

Krasnoramenye (Russian: Краснораменье) is a rural locality (a village) in Penkinskoye Rural Settlement, Kameshkovsky District, Vladimir Oblast, Russia. The population was 16 as of 2010.

== Geography ==
Krasnoramenye is located on the Klyazma River, 32 km south of Kameshkovo (the district's administrative centre) by road. Penkino is the nearest rural locality.
