= Balmyshevo =

Balmyshevo Балмышево
- Village
- Location within Vladimir Oblast Location within Russia
- Coordinates: 56°25′N 40°57′E
- Country: Russia
- Region: Vladimir Oblast
- District: Kameshkovsky District
- Time zone: UTC+3:00

Balmyshevo (Russian: Балмышево) is a rural locality (a village) in Vakhromeyevskoye Rural Settlement, Kameshkovsky District, Vladimir Oblast, Russia. The population was 11 as of 2010.

== Geography ==
Balmyshevo is located on the Seksha River, 13 km north of Kameshkovo (the district's administrative centre) by road. Simakovo is the nearest rural locality.
