= Sanzhi, Republic of Dagestan =

Abandoned village in Dagestan

Sanzhi Санжи
- Village
- Interactive map of Sanzhi
- Location of Sanzhi Sanzhi (Russia)
- Coordinates: 41°58′40″N 47°33′51″E
- Country: Russia
- Region: Republic of Dagestan
- District: Dakhadayevsky District

Population
  - Total: 0
- Time zone: UTC+3
  - Summer (DST): UTC+4

Sanzhi is an abolished village in the Dakhadayevsky District of the Republic of Dagestan. It was part of the Itsarinsky Village Council. It was abolished in the early 1970s, and the majority of its population moved to the village of Druzhba.

== Geography ==
It was located on the left bank of the Ulluchai River, 2.5 km southeast of the village of Itsari.

== History ==
Since 1860, it was part of the Ashtikulinskoye Naibstvo of the Kazikumukhsky district.

Until 1925, the village was part of the Kazikumukhskiy okrug.

According to data from 1926, the Sanzhi farmstead consisted of 22 farms and was part of the Ashtyn village council of the Dakhadaevsky district.

In 1944, the village's residents were resettled to the territory of the former Chechen-Ingush Autonomous Soviet Socialist Republic and the village was liquidated. In 1958, after the Chechens returned from deportation, the former village residents returned, and the settlement was re-established, but this time as part of the Itsari village council.

Until its final dissolution, the village served as a branch of the Itsari village Komsomol collective farm.

In 1969, a planned resettlement of the village's residents to the plains to the village of Druzhba began. By the early 1970s, the residents had dispersed, and the settlement was abolished.

== Population ==
Historical population
Year	Pop.	±% p.a.
1895	72	—
1908	61	−1.27%
1926	94	+2.43%
1939	121	+1.96%
1959	94	−1.25%
1970	67	−3.03%

The village was mono-ethnic-Dargin.

The village's occupants spoke the Sanzhi language, while also using the Kumyk language for interethnic communication.
