= Bliznino =

Bliznino Близнино
- Village
- Location within Vladimir Oblast Location within Russia
- Coordinates: 56°13′N 40°46′E
- Country: Russia
- Region: Vladimir Oblast
- District: Kameshkovsky District
- Time zone: UTC+3:00

Bliznino (Russian: Близнино) is a rural locality (a village) in Vtorovskoye Rural Settlement, Kameshkovsky District, Vladimir Oblast, Russia. The population was 18 as of 2010.

== Geography ==
Bliznino is located 22 km southwest of Kameshkovo (the district's administrative centre) by road. Laptevo is the nearest rural locality.
