= Posyolok sanatoriya imeni Lenina =

Posyolok sanatoriya imeni Lenina Посёлок санатория имени Ленина
- Settlement
- Location within Vladimir Oblast Location within Russia
- Coordinates: 56°10′N 40°52′E
- Country: Russia
- Region: Vladimir Oblast
- District: Kameshkovsky District
- Time zone: UTC+3:00

Posyolok sanatoriya imeni Lenina (Russian: Посёлок санатория имени Ленина) is a rural locality (a settlement) in Penkinskoye Rural Settlement, Kameshkovsky District, Vladimir Oblast, Russia. The population was 23 as of 2010.

== Geography ==
The settlement is located on the Klyazma River, 33 km southwest of Kameshkovo (the district's administrative centre) by road. Trofimovka is the nearest rural locality.
