= Saulovo =

Saulovo Саулово
- Village
- Location within Vladimir Oblast Location within Russia
- Coordinates: 56°24′N 40°47′E
- Country: Russia
- Region: Vladimir Oblast
- District: Kameshkovsky District
- Time zone: UTC+3:00

Saulovo (Russian: Саулово) is a rural locality (a village) in Sergeikhinskoye Rural Settlement, Kameshkovsky District, Vladimir Oblast, Russia. The population was 29 as of 2010.

== Geography ==
Saulovo is located 16 km northwest of Kameshkovo (the district's administrative centre) by road. Ryakhovo is the nearest rural locality.
