= Kamenovo, Vladimir Oblast =

Kamenovo Каменово
- Village
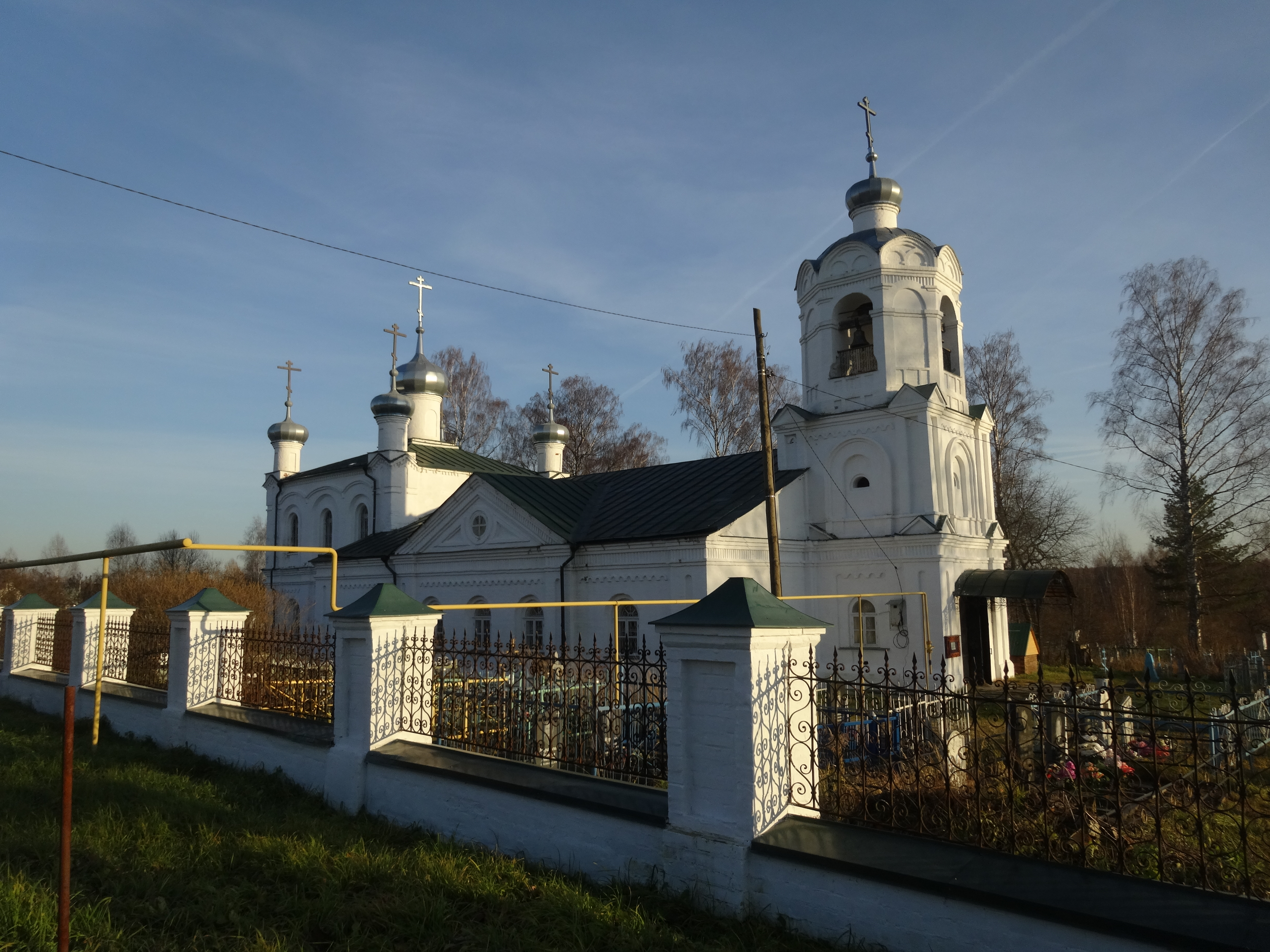

- Location within Vladimir Oblast Location within Russia
- Coordinates: 56°23′N 40°58′E
- Country: Russia
- Region: Vladimir Oblast
- District: Kameshkovsky District
- Time zone: UTC+3:00

Kamenovo (Russian: Каменово) is a rural locality (a village) in Vakhromeyevskoye Rural Settlement, Kameshkovsky District, Vladimir Oblast, Russia. The population was 56 as of 2010.

== Geography ==
Kamenovo is located 9 km north of Kameshkovo (the district's administrative centre) by road. Edemskoye is the nearest rural locality.
