= Gavrilsevo =

Gavrilsevo Гаврильцево
- Village
- Location within Vladimir Oblast Location within Russia
- Coordinates: 56°11′N 40°52′E
- Country: Russia
- Region: Vladimir Oblast
- District: Kameshkovsky District
- Time zone: UTC+3:00

Gavrilsevo (Russian: Гаврильцево) is a rural locality (a village) in Penkinskoye Rural Settlement, Kameshkovsky District, Vladimir Oblast, Russia. The population was 10 as of 2010.

== Geography ==
Gavrilsevo is located 25 km southwest of Kameshkovo (the district's administrative centre) by road. Neverkovo is the nearest rural locality.
