= Posyolok imeni Krasina =

Posyolok imeni Krasina Посёлок имени Красина
- Settlement
- Location within Vladimir Oblast Location within Russia
- Coordinates: 56°26′N 40°54′E
- Country: Russia
- Region: Vladimir Oblast
- District: Kameshkovsky District
- Time zone: UTC+3:00

Posyolok imeni Krasina (Russian: Посёлок имени Красина) is a rural locality (a settlement) in Vakhromeyevskoye Rural Settlement, Kameshkovsky District, Vladimir Oblast, Russia. The population was 351 as of 2010. There are 4 streets.

== Geography ==
The settlement is located on the Seksha River, 16 km north of Kameshkovo (the district's administrative centre) by road. Tyntsy is the nearest rural locality.
