= Ryabinovka, Vladimir Oblast =

Ryabinovka Рябиновка
- Village
- Location within Vladimir Oblast Location within Russia
- Coordinates: 56°26′N 40°53′E
- Country: Russia
- Region: Vladimir Oblast
- District: Kameshkovsky District
- Time zone: UTC+3:00

Ryabinovka (Russian: Рябиновка) is a rural locality (a village) in Vakhromeyevskoye Rural Settlement, Kameshkovsky District, Vladimir Oblast, Russia. The population was 35 as of 2010.

== Geography ==
Ryabinovka is located 19 km north of Kameshkovo (the district's administrative centre) by road. Tyntsy is the nearest rural locality.
