= Loshaikha =

Loshaikha Лошаиха
- Village
- Location within Vladimir Oblast Location within Russia
- Coordinates: 56°23′N 40°47′E
- Country: Russia
- Region: Vladimir Oblast
- District: Kameshkovsky District
- Time zone: UTC+3:00

Loshaikha (Russian: Лошаиха) is a rural locality (a village) in Sergeikhinskoye Rural Settlement, Kameshkovsky District, Vladimir Oblast, Russia. The population was 12 as of 2010.

== Geography ==
Loshaikha is located 19 km northwest of Kameshkovo (the district's administrative centre) by road. Saulovo is the nearest rural locality.
