= Krutovo, Kameshkovsky District, Vladimir Oblast =

Krutovo Крутово
- Village
- Location within Vladimir Oblast Location within Russia
- Coordinates: 56°22′N 40°44′E
- Country: Russia
- Region: Vladimir Oblast
- District: Kameshkovsky District
- Time zone: UTC+3:00

Krutovo (Russian: Крутово) is a rural locality (a village) in Sergeikhinskoye Rural Settlement, Kameshkovsky District, Vladimir Oblast, Russia. The population was 9 as of 2010.

== Geography ==
Krutovo is located 23 km west of Kameshkovo (the district's administrative centre) by road. Novosyolka is the nearest rural locality.
