= Privolye, Vladimir Oblast =

Privolye Приволье
- Village
- Location within Vladimir Oblast Location within Russia
- Coordinates: 56°26′N 41°09′E
- Country: Russia
- Region: Vladimir Oblast
- District: Kameshkovsky District
- Time zone: UTC+3:00

Privolye (Russian: Приволье) is a rural locality (a village) in Bryzgalovskoye Rural Settlement, Kameshkovsky District, Vladimir Oblast, Russia. The population was 63 as of 2010.

== Geography ==
Privolye is located on the Uvod River, 17 km northeast of Kameshkovo (the district's administrative centre) by road. Pobochnevo is the nearest rural locality.
