= Bryzgalovo =

Bryzgalovo Брызгалово
- Village
- Location within Vladimir Oblast Location within Russia
- Coordinates: 56°25′N 41°04′E
- Country: Russia
- Region: Vladimir Oblast
- District: Kameshkovsky District
- Time zone: UTC+3:00

Bryzgalovo (Russian: Брызгалово) is a rural locality (a village) in Bryzgalovskoye Rural Settlement, Kameshkovsky District, Vladimir Oblast, Russia. The population was 234 as of 2010.

== Geography ==
Bryzgalovo is located 14 km northeast of Kameshkovo (the district's administrative centre) by road. Nazarovo is the nearest rural locality.
