= Vakurino =

Vakurino Вакурино
- Village
- Location within Vladimir Oblast Location within Russia
- Coordinates: 56°27′N 40°59′E
- Country: Russia
- Region: Vladimir Oblast
- District: Kameshkovsky District
- Time zone: UTC+3:00

Vakurino (Russian: Вакурино) is a rural locality (a village) in Vakhromeyevskoye Rural Settlement, Kameshkovsky District, Vladimir Oblast, Russia. The population was 30 as of 2010.

== Geography ==
Vakurino is located on the Talsha River, 18 km north of Kameshkovo (the district's administrative centre) by road. Krasnoznamensky is the nearest rural locality.
