= Ruchkino =

Ruchkino Ручкино
- Village
- Location within Vladimir Oblast Location within Russia
- Coordinates: 56°28′N 41°02′E
- Country: Russia
- Region: Vladimir Oblast
- District: Kameshkovsky District
- Time zone: UTC+3:00

Ruchkino (Russian: Ручкино) is a rural locality (a village) in Bryzgalovskoye Rural Settlement, Kameshkovsky District, Vladimir Oblast, Russia. The population was 19 as of 2010.

== Geography ==
Ruchkino is located on the Talsha River, 18 km north of Kameshkovo (the district's administrative centre) by road. Arefino is the nearest rural locality.
