= Grezino, Vladimir Oblast =

Grezino Грезино
- Village
- Location within Vladimir Oblast Location within Russia
- Coordinates: 56°10′N 40°38′E
- Country: Russia
- Region: Vladimir Oblast
- District: Kameshkovsky District
- Time zone: UTC+3:00

Grezino (Russian: Грезино) is a rural locality (a village) in Vtorovskoye Rural Settlement, Kameshkovsky District, Vladimir Oblast, Russia. The population was 6 as of 2010.

== Geography ==
Grezino is located 41 km southwest of Kameshkovo (the district's administrative centre) by road. Orgtrud is the nearest rural locality.
