= Neverkovo =

Neverkovo Неверково
- Village
- Location within Vladimir Oblast Location within Russia
- Coordinates: 56°11′N 40°51′E
- Country: Russia
- Region: Vladimir Oblast
- District: Kameshkovsky District
- Time zone: UTC+3:00

Neverkovo (Russian: Неверково) is a rural locality (a village) in Penkinskoye Rural Settlement, Kameshkovsky District, Vladimir Oblast, Russia. The population was 48 as of 2010.

== Geography ==
Neverkovo is located 25 km southwest of Kameshkovo (the district's administrative centre) by road. Pozharnitsy is the nearest rural locality.
