= Chistukha =

Chistukha Чистуха
- Selo
- Location within Vladimir Oblast Location within Russia
- Coordinates: 56°17′N 40°40′E
- Country: Russia
- Region: Vladimir Oblast
- District: Kameshkovsky District
- Time zone: UTC+3:00

Chistukha (Russian: Чистуха) is a rural locality (a selo) in Vtorovskoye Rural Settlement, Kameshkovsky District, Vladimir Oblast, Russia. The population was 9 as of 2010.

== Geography ==
Chistukha is located 30 km southwest of Kameshkovo (the district's administrative centre) by road. Palashkino is the nearest rural locality.
