= Kurmenyovo =

Kurmenyovo Курменёво
- Village
- Location within Vladimir Oblast Location within Russia
- Coordinates: 56°15′N 40°49′E
- Country: Russia
- Region: Vladimir Oblast
- District: Kameshkovsky District
- Time zone: UTC+3:00

Kurmenyovo (Russian: Курменёво) is a rural locality (a village) in Vtorovskoye Rural Settlement, Kameshkovsky District, Vladimir Oblast, Russia. The population was 4 as of 2010.

== Geography ==
Kurmenyovo is located 18 km southwest of Kameshkovo (the district's administrative centre) by road. Yuratino is the nearest rural locality.
