= Istomino, Kameshkovsky District, Vladimir Oblast =

Istomino Истомино
- Village
- Location within Vladimir Oblast Location within Russia
- Coordinates: 56°16′N 40°57′E
- Country: Russia
- Region: Vladimir Oblast
- District: Kameshkovsky District
- Time zone: UTC+3:00

Istomino (Russian: Истомино) is a rural locality (a village) in Vtorovskoye Rural Settlement, Kameshkovsky District, Vladimir Oblast, Russia. The population was 6 as of 2010.

== Geography ==
Istomino is located 12 km south of Kameshkovo (the district's administrative centre) by road. Mishnevo is the nearest rural locality.
