= Itsari language =

Northeast Caucasian language or dialect in Dagestan, Russia

Itsari
- Icari
- ицӀран гъай ИцIрила гъай
- Pronunciation: [its’ran ʁaj] [its’arila]
- Native to: North Caucasus
- Region: Dagestan
- Ethnicity: Dargins
- Native speakers: 2,000 (2003)
- Language family: Northeast Caucasian: Dargin; Southern; Sanzhi-Itsari; Itsari
- Writing system: unwritten

Language codes
- ISO 639-3: –
- Glottolog: icar1234
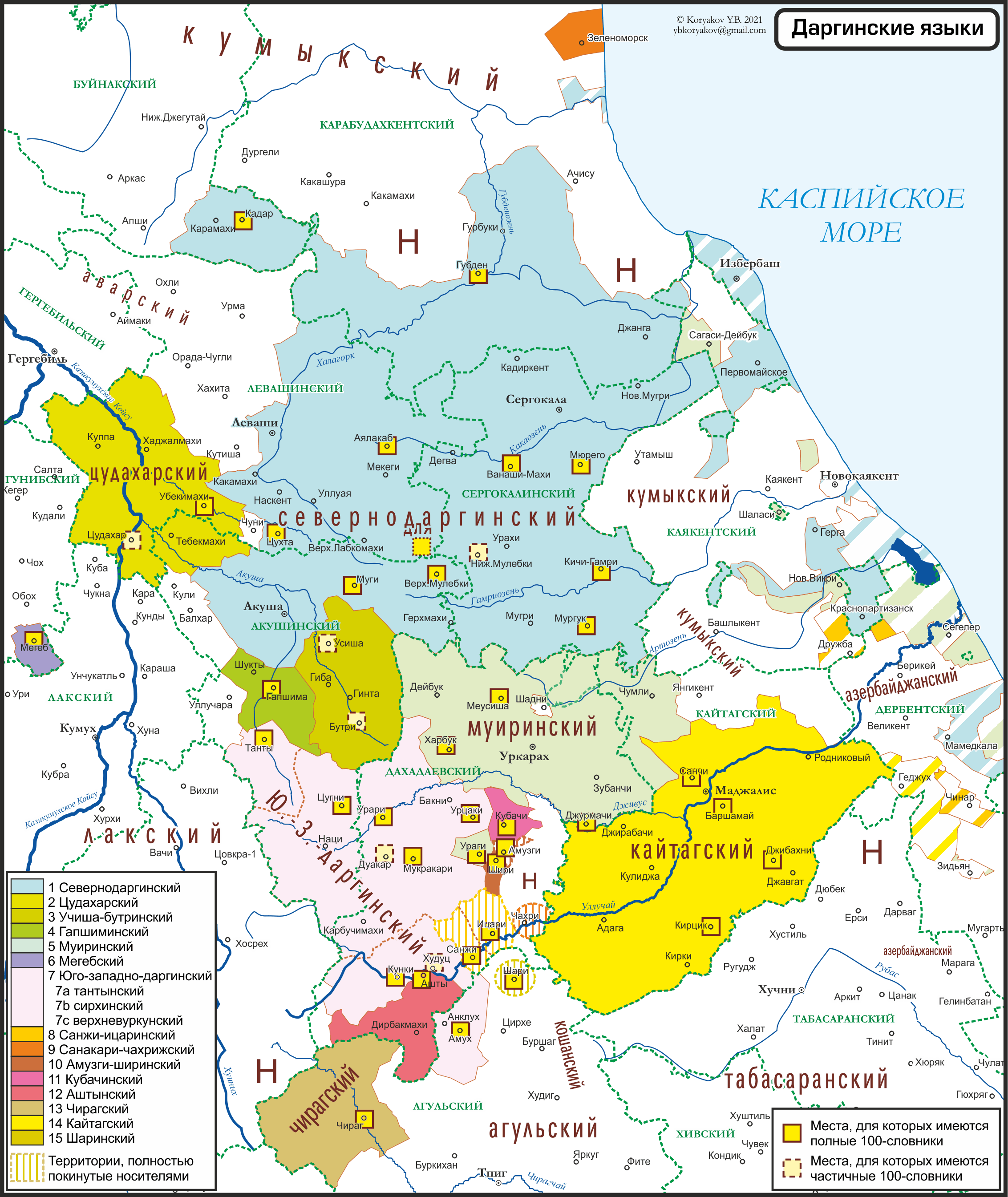
- Itsari (and Sanzhi)

Itsari (Icari, Itsari: ицӀран гъай) is a language in the Dargin dialect continuum spoken in Dagestan, Russia spoken in the village Itsari, as well as in Kizlyarsky District, Druzhba, and other villages and cities, both in and outside of Dagestan, by about 2,000 people. It is often considered a divergent dialect of Dargwa. Ethnologue lists it as a dialect of Dargwa but recognizes that it may be a separate language. Its closest relative is Sanzhi, which has only about 200 speakers and is considered to be an endangered language, as parents are now teaching their children Russian for practical purposes.

== Usage ==
In the village of Itsari, the Itsari language is used for all purposes except writing, as the residents of Itsari use standard written Dargwa or Russian as their written language. The younger population is shifting to Russian as their primary language.

== Phonology ==
=== Vowels ===
Vowels of Itsari
		Front	Back	
		Front	plain	phar.
Close	short	[i] i	[u] u	[uˤ] uӏ
Close	long	[iː] ī	[uː] ū	
Mid/Low	short	[e] e	[ɑ] а	[ɑˤ] aӏ
Mid/Low	long	[eː] ē	[ɑː] ā	

Itsari has phonemic pharyngealization, as is evidenced by the minimal pair šam 'lamb' – šaӏm 'candle'.

=== Consonants ===
		Bilabial	Dental	Alveolar	Palatal	Velar	Uvular	Pharyngeal	Glottal
Plosive	voiced	[b] b	[d] d						
Plosive	lax	[p] p	[t] t			[k] k	[q] q		
Plosive	tense	[pː] p̄	[tː] t̄			[kː] кк kk	[qː] q̄		
Plosive	ejective	[pʼ] pʼ	[tʼ] tʼ			[kʼ] кӏ kʼ	[qʼ] qʼ	[ʡʼ] ʕ	[ʔ] ʔ
Fricative	voiced	([f] f)	[z] z	[ʒ] ž		[ɣ] ǧ	[ʁ] R	[ħ] H	[h] h
Fricative	lax		[s] s	[ʃ] š		[x] x	[χ] X		
Fricative	tense		[sː] s̄	[ʃː] s̄̌		[xː] x̄	[χː] X̄		
Affricate	lax		[t͡s] c	[t͡ʃ] č					
Affricate	tense		[t͡sː] c̄	[t͡ʃː] c̄̌					
Affricate	ejective		[t͡sʼ] cʼ	[t͡ʃʼ] čʼ					
Resonant		[m] m, [w] w	[n] n, [l] l	[r] r	[j] j				
