= Druzhba, Vladimir Oblast =

Druzhba Дружба
- Settlement
- Location within Vladimir Oblast Location within Russia
- Coordinates: 56°22′N 41°03′E
- Country: Russia
- Region: Vladimir Oblast
- District: Kameshkovsky District
- Time zone: UTC+3:00

Druzhba (Russian: Дружба) is a rural locality (a settlement) in Bryzgalovskoye Rural Settlement, Kameshkovsky District, Vladimir Oblast, Russia. The population was 796 as of 2010. There are 5 streets.

== Geography ==
Druzhba is located 7 km northeast of Kameshkovo (the district's administrative centre) by road. Novki is the nearest rural locality.
