= Druzhba =

Druzhba may refer to:

== Places ==
- The former name of the city Khutir-Mykhailivskyi in Sumy Oblast, Ukraine
- Druzhba, Chernihiv Oblast, an urban-type settlement in Chernihiv Oblast, Ukraine
- Druzhba, Donetsk Oblast, an urban-type settlement in Donetsk Oblast, Ukraine
- Druzhba, Ternopil Oblast, an urban-type settlement in Ternopil Oblast, Ukraine
- Druzhba, Zhytomyr Oblast, an urban-type settlement in Zhytomyr Oblast, Ukraine
- The Russian name of the city of Dostyk, Kazakhstan
- Druzhba, Vidin Province, a village in Vidin Province, Bulgaria
- Druzhba, Russia, the name of several rural localities in Russia
- Druzhba Metro Station, Bulgaria
- Stadion Druzhba, Dobrich, Bulgaria
- Druzhba Arena, indoor arena in Donetsk destroyed in 2014

== Other uses ==
- 1621 Druzhba, an asteroid
- Druzhba pipeline, Russian oil pipeline stretching from Central Russia to Central Europe
- Druzhba (ship)
- Friendship Games, also known as Druzhba-84 or Druzhba Games, an international multisport event held in 1984 in nine different countries
- Druzhba (brand), a Russian chainsaw brand
- Druzhba-78, a former ice hockey team based in Kharkiv, Ukraine

== See also ==
- Hotel Družba in Prague
