= 1621 Druzhba =

Asteroid

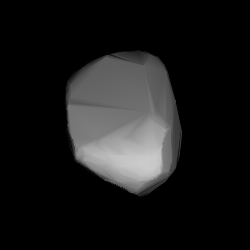
- Shape model of Druzhba from its lightcurve

Discovery
- Discovered by: S. Belyavskyj
- Discovery site: Simeiz Obs.
- Discovery date: 1 October 1926

Designations
- Named after: дружба – lit. friendship (in Russian)
- Alternative designations: 1926 TM · 1927 AE; 1931 EO · 1946 UH; 1949 QS_{1} · 1951 EK_{1} 1951 ER_{1} · 1958 GA; 1979 QP_{4}
- Minor planet category: main-belt · Flora

Orbital characteristics
- Epoch 4 September 2017 (JD 2458000.5)
- Uncertainty parameter 0
- Observation arc: 90.49 yr (33,052 days)
- Aphelion: 2.4948 AU
- Perihelion: 1.9650 AU
- Semi-major axis: 2.2299 AU
- Eccentricity: 0.1188
- Orbital period (sidereal): 3.33 yr (1,216 days)
- Mean anomaly: 73.187°
- Mean motion: 0° 17^{m} 45.6^{s} / day
- Inclination: 3.1730°
- Longitude of ascending node: 181.88°
- Argument of perihelion: 238.14°

Physical characteristics
- Dimensions: 9.05 km (derived); 9.08±0.8 km 11.70±0.20 km 12.694±0.296 km
- Synodic rotation period: 12 h (dated); 47.9±0.5 h (dated); 99.100±0.005 h 99.20±0.03 h
- Geometric albedo: 0.2373±0.046; 0.243 (derived); 0.244±0.039; 0.312±0.012
- Spectral type: Tholen = S · S B–V = 0.898; U–B = 0.503
- Absolute magnitude (H): 11.63 · 12.37±0.09 · 12.39 · 12.53±0.29

1621 Druzhba (provisional designation 1926 TM), is a stony Florian asteroid and relatively slow rotator from the inner regions of the asteroid belt, approximately 10 km (6.2 mi) in diameter. It was discovered on 1 October 1926, by Russian astronomer Sergey Belyavsky at Simeiz Observatory on the Crimean peninsula. It was named after the Russian word for friendship.

== Classification and orbit ==
Druzhba is a member of the Flora family, one of the largest collisional groups of stony asteroids in the main-belt. It orbits the Sun at a distance of 2.0–2.5 AU once every 3 years and 4 months (1,216 days). Its orbit has an eccentricity of 0.12 and an inclination of 3° with respect to the ecliptic. Druzhba's observation arc begins at the discovering observatory, one week after its official discovery observation.

== Physical characteristics ==
In the Tholen classification, Druzhba is a common S-type asteroid.

=== Rotation period ===
In August 2009, American amateur astronomer Robert D. Stephens obtained a rotational lightcurve of Druzhba from photometric observations. In gave a well-defined rotation period of 99.20 hours with a change in brightness of 0.75 magnitude (U=3) A 2016-published modeled light-curve of 99.100 hours concurred with the result.

This makes it a relatively slow rotator, as the vast majority of minor planets rotate every 2 to 20 hours around their axis. Druzhba's long rotation period was particularly difficulty to measure: Previously, observations by Richard Ditteon at Oakley Observatory gave a period solution of 47.9 hours (Δmag 1.0; U=1), while Polish astronomer Wiesław Wiśniewski obtained a period of only 12 hours in the late 1980s (Δmag 0.16; U=1).

=== Diameter and albedo ===
According to the surveys carried out by the Infrared Astronomical Satellite IRAS, the Japanese Akari satellite, and NASA's Wide-field Infrared Survey Explorer with its subsequent NEOWISE mission, Druzhba measures between 9.08 and 12.69 km (5.64 and 7.89 mi) in diameter, and its surface has an albedo between 0.237 and 0.312.

Based on an absolute magnitude of 12.37, the Collaborative Asteroid Lightcurve Link derives a diameter of 9.05 km (5.62 mi) and an albedo of 0.243 – similar to the albedo of 8 Flora, the family's largest member and namesake.

== Naming ==
This minor planet was named Druzhba, this is a Slavic word for friendship and the name of several cities, towns and other localities in Russia, Ukraine, Bulgaria and Kazakhstan. The asteroid's name was proposed by the Institute of Theoretical Astronomy in St. Petersburg. The official naming citation was published by the Minor Planet Center on 1 June 1967 (M.P.C. 2740).
