= Sanzhi language =

Dargin language

Sanzhi
- Sanzhi Dargwa
- сунглан гъай sunglan ʁaj
- Pronunciation: [sunglan ʁaj]
- Native to: Russia
- Region: Dagestan
- Ethnicity: Sanzhi Dargwa (sunglan-te)
- Native speakers: 250 (2019)
- Language family: Northeast Caucasian: Dargin; Southern; Sanzhi-Itsari; Sanzhi

Language codes
- ISO 639-3: None (mis)
- Glottolog: sanz1248
- ELP: Sanzhi Dargwa
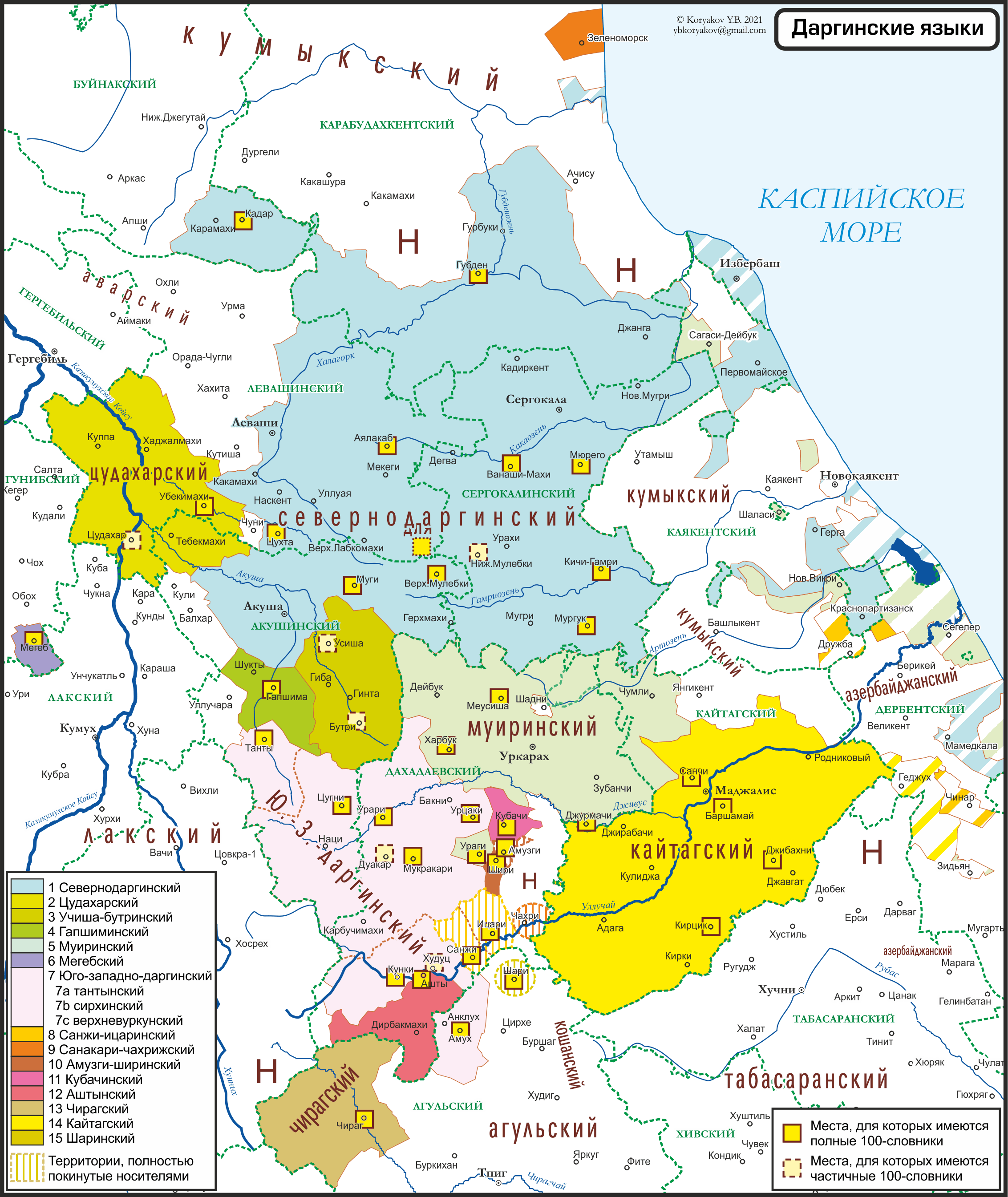
- Sanzhi (and Itsari)

Sanzhi (Sanzhi: sunglan ʁaj, also called Sanzhi Dargwa) is an endangered Dargin language spoken by about 250 people in Dagestan, part of the Northeast Caucasian family and closely related to Itsari. It is considered critically endangered due to its obsolescence in favor of Russian. The language is unwritten.

== History ==
In the 1970s, the Sanzhis left their original village of Sanzhi, which is believed to have been inhabited for around 10,000 years, and moved to the lowlands, predominantly the village of Druzhba. In the summers, however, they still return to Sanzhi to do various activities like fishing and berry picking.

== Phonology ==
=== Consonants ===
		Bilabial	Alveolar	Postalveolar	Palatal	Velar		Uvular		Pharyngeal/ Epiglottal	Glottal
		Bilabial	Alveolar	Postalveolar	Palatal	plain	lab.	plain	lab.	Pharyngeal/ Epiglottal	Glottal
Stop	plain	p	t			k	kʷ	q (Note: /q/ and /qʷ/ are realized with significant affrication, such that they are pronounced more like /q͡χ/ and /q͡χʷ/. This is not present in the ejective /q’/ and the geminates /qː/ and /qːʷ/.)	qʷ	ʡ	ʔ
Stop	voiced	b	d			g	gʷ				
Stop	ejective	pʼ	tʼ			kʼ	kʼʷ	qʼ	qʼʷ		
Stop	geminate	pː	tː			kː	kːʷ	qː	qːʷ		
Fricative	plain		s	ʃ		x	xʷ	χ	χʷ	ħ	h
Fricative	voiced		z	ʒ				ʁ	ʁʷ		
Fricative	geminate		sː	ʃː		xː		χː	χːʷ		
Affricate	plain		t͡s	t͡ʃ							
Affricate	ejective		t͡sʼ	t͡ʃʼ							
Affricate	geminate		t͡sː	t͡ʃː							
Nasal		m	n								
Liquid			r l								
Semivowel		w			j						

Younger speakers tend to pronounce the labialized consonants as plain ones.

=== Vowels ===
Sanzhi has 7 vowels, 4 plain ones and 3 pharyngealized vowels.

	Front		Central		Back	
	plain	phar.	plain	phar.	plain	phar.
Close	i	[iˁ]			u	uˁ
Mid	e					
Open			a	aˁ		

/i/ has the allophones [ı], [i]; [ıˁ], [iˁ], /e/ can be realized as [e] or [], and /u/ is realized as [u], [ʊ]; /uˁ/ is also pronounced as [ʊˁ].

[aˁ] is by far the most common pharyngealized vowel, as [uˁ] is much rarer and has only one known minimal pair. Only a few words have [iˁ], and even speakers are uncertain about it.

=== Syllable structure ===
Possible syllables in native words are as follows:

V, VC, VCC, CV, CVC and CVCC

The general structure is (C)V(C)(C).

Simple underived verbs, however, are much more limited in their structure; only [r], [l] and [ʡ] are permitted in the onset.

== Morphology ==
=== Nouns ===
Nouns in Sanzhi Dargwa are marked for gender, number, and case. It distinguishes between three genders (masculine, feminine, and neuter); has a singular-plural distinction in number; and has four grammatical cases (absolutive, ergative, dative, genitive) in addition to many spatial cases. Typical of Northeast Cauccasian languages, it displays ergative-absolutive alignment.

==== Gender ====
Sanzhi has a gender system typical of other Northeast Caucasian languages. They can appear as prefixes, suffixes, or infixes, and typically are not marked on nouns.

Gender Agreement Affixes
	Singular	1st/2nd Plural	3rd Plural
Masc.	w/∅	d	b
Fem.	r	d	b
Neuter	b	d	

==== Number ====
The singular is unmarked, and the plural can be marked by several suffixes. The most productive suffixes are -e, -be, -te, and -me. Examples:

t'ult > t'ult-e 'bread'

bazar > bazar-te 'market'

Stem vowels may also undergo vowel mutation during this process: χabar > χabur-te ‘story, news’.

==== Case ====
Sanzhi Dargwa has 4 grammatical cases, 19 semantic cases, and 1 directional suffix.

===== Grammatical Cases =====
The core grammatical cases are absolutive, ergative, genitive, and dative, which appear as suffixes. Case endings are typically attached to an oblique stem. For singular nouns, the oblique stem is identical to the ergative case.

Grammatical Case Suffixes
Case	Suffix	Singular	Plural
Absolutive	-∅	juldaš 'friend'	juldaš:-e
Ergative	-l(i)	juldaš-li	juldaš:-a-l
Genitive	-la (-lla)	juldaš-la	juldaš-a(l)-la
Dative	-j	juldaš-li-j	juldaš:-a-li-j

Since Sanzhi Dargwa has absolutive-ergative alignment, the absolutive case occurs on the sole argument of an intransitive verb, or as the patient/theme of transitive or ditransitive verbs.

du-l ka-d-iq:-an=da qix-be-∅
1SG-ERG DOWN-NPL-carry.IPFV-PTCP=1 nut-PL-ABS
‘I will bring nuts.’

The ergative case suffix -li (with allomorphs -ni, -ri, and -l) occurs on the agent of transitive and ditransitive predicates.

hin-ni heχ lus b-ik'-aq-u
water-ERG DEM.DOWN around N-move.IPFV-CAUS-PRS
The water turns this around

The genitive case suffix -la (with allomorphs -na, -ra, and -lla) is used to denote various relations such as possession, material, and units of measurement.

niš:a-la sungli-la š:i-l-c:e-b
1PL-GEN Sanzhi.person.OBL-GEN village-OBL-IN-N
In our village of Sanzhi

xujal litru-la čaˁʁir-la kanister
five liter-GEN wine-GEN canister
Five liter canister of wine

guž-la admi
strength-GEN person
Strong person

It is also used on the arguments of most postpositions.

qal-la sala
house-GEN in.front
In front of the house

The dative case (-j) can be used as an experiencer with affective predicates:

dam simi d-ulq-u
1SG.DAT anger NPL-direct.IPFV-PRS
I am angry
Lit. 'anger directs to me'

For beneficiaries:

b-irq'-an=da rurs:i-j ʡaˁħ meq
N-do.IPFV-PTCP=1 girl-DAT good wedding
(I) will make a big wedding for my daughter

And for temporal duration:

du-l b-irq'-id dars ca saˁʡaˁt-li-j
1SG-ERG N-do.IPFV-1.PRS homework one hour-OBL-DAT
I will do the homework in one hour

===== Semantic Cases =====
Typical of Dagestanian languages, the semantic cases, also known as "spatial" cases, are organized along two dimensions: location and direction (i.e., movement).

		Direction		
		Lative	Essive	Ablative
Location	LOC "in, on"	-le, -ja, -a	-le-b, -ja-b, -a-b	-le-r(-ka), -ja-r(-ka), -a-r(-ka)
Location	AD "at, close to"	-š:u	-š:u-b	-š:u-r(-ka)
Location	IN "in, on, at"	-c:e	-c:e-b	-c:e-r(-ka)
Location	SUB "under"	-gu	-gu-b	-gu-r(-ka)
Location	ANTE "in front"	-sa	-sa-b	-sa-r(-ka)
Location	POST "behind"	-hara	-hara-b	-hara-r(-ka)

- Lative denotes direction to a goal
- Essive denotes a stative location at a reference point
- Ablative denotes movement away from a reference point, or movement through/along a point

Examples:

tusnaq-le-w=uw iž ʡaˁrmija-le-w=uw?
prison-LOC-M=Q this army-LOC-M=Q
"Is he in prison or in the army?"

hel-i-š:u-rka k-aq:-ib-le kaʁar
that-OBL-AD-ABL DOWN-carry-PRET-CVB letter
"From him (they) brought a permission (lit. 'letter')"

il durħuˁ t:ura ha-w-q-un ca-w hel zamana q:ap-li-c:e-r
that boy outside UP-M-go.PFV-PRET COP-M that time sack-OBL-IN-ABL
"At this time, that boy came out of the sack"
