= Druzhba, Ust-Kalmansky District, Altai Krai =

Druzhba Дружба
- Settlement
- Location within Altai Krai Location within Russia
- Coordinates: 52°14′N 83°17′E
- Country: Russia
- Region: Altai Krai
- District: Ust-Kalmansky District
- Time zone: UTC+7:00

Druzhba (Russian: Дружба) is a rural locality (a settlement) in Charyshsky Selsoviet, Ust-Kalmansky District, Altai Krai, Russia. The population was 96 as of 2013. There are 2 streets.

== Geography ==
Druzhba is located 19 km north of Ust-Kalmanka (the district's administrative centre) by road. Ust-Zhuravlikha is the nearest rural locality.
