= Druzhba, Republic of Bashkortostan =

Druzhba Дружба
- Selo
- Location within Bashkortostan Location within Russia
- Coordinates: 54°16′N 55°05′E
- Country: Russia
- Region: Bashkortostan
- District: Davlekanovsky District
- Time zone: UTC+5:00

Druzhba (Russian: Дружба; Bashkir: Дуҫлыҡ, Duślıq) is a rural locality (a selo) in Polyakovsky Selsoviet, Davlekanovsky District, Bashkortostan, Russia. The population was 305 as of 2010. There are 2 streets.

== Geography ==
Druzhba is located 10 km northeast of Davlekanovo (the district's administrative centre) by road. Bishkain is the nearest rural locality.
