= Druzhba, Belgorod Oblast =

Druzhba Дружба
- Settlement
- Location within Belgorod Oblast Location within Russia
- Coordinates: 50°10′N 38°05′E
- Country: Russia
- Region: Belgorod Oblast
- District: Valuysky District
- Time zone: UTC+3:00

Druzhba (Russian: Дружба) is a rural locality (a settlement) in Valuysky District, Belgorod Oblast, Russia. The population was 278 as of 2010. There are 2 streets.

== Geography ==
Druzhba is located 6 km south of Valuyki (the district's administrative centre) by road. Valuyki is the nearest rural locality.
