= Druzhba, Dyatkovsky District, Bryansk Oblast =

Druzhba Дружба
- Settlement
- Location within Bryansk Oblast Location within Russia
- Coordinates: 53°34′N 34°22′E
- Country: Russia
- Region: Bryansk Oblast
- District: Dyatkovsky District
- Time zone: UTC+3:00

Druzhba (Russian: Дружба) is a rural locality (a settlement) and the administrative center of Bolshezhukovskoye Rural Settlement, Dyatkovsky District, Bryansk Oblast, Russia. The population was 1,605 as of 2010. There are 11 streets.

== Geography ==
Druzhba is located 5 km south of Dyatkovo (the district's administrative centre) by road. Dyatkovo is the nearest rural locality.
