= Itsari =

Itsari Ицари ИцIари
- Selo
- Location within Republic of Dagestan Location within Russia
- Coordinates: 41°59′N 47°34′E
- Country: Russia
- Region: Republic of Dagestan
- District: Dakhadayevsky District
- Time zone: UTC+3:00

Itsari (Russian: Ицари; Dargwa: ИцIари) is a rural locality (a selo) and the administrative centre of Itsarinsky Selsoviet, Dakhadayevsky District, Republic of Dagestan, Russia. In 2010, the population was 225.

== Geography ==
Itsari is located 55 km southwest of Urkarakh (the district's administrative centre) by road. Khuduts and Dzilebki are the nearest rural localities.
