= Druzhba, Republic of Dagestan =

Druzhba Дружба
- Selo
- Location within Republic of Dagestan Location within Russia
- Coordinates: 42°14′N 47°59′E
- Country: Russia
- Region: Republic of Dagestan
- District: Kayakentsky District
- Time zone: UTC+3:00

Druzhba (Russian: Дружба) is a rural locality (a selo) in Kayakentsky District, Republic of Dagestan, Russia. The population was 3,675 as of 2010. There are 38 streets.

== Geography ==
Druzhba is located 23 km south of Novokayakent (the district's administrative centre) by road. Dzhemikent and Krasnopartizansk are the nearest rural localities.

== Nationalities ==
Dargins, Tabasarans. Aghuls, Lezgins and Kumyks live there.
