= Kameshkovo, Vladimir Oblast =

Town in Vladimir Oblast, Russia

Kameshkovo Камешково
- Town
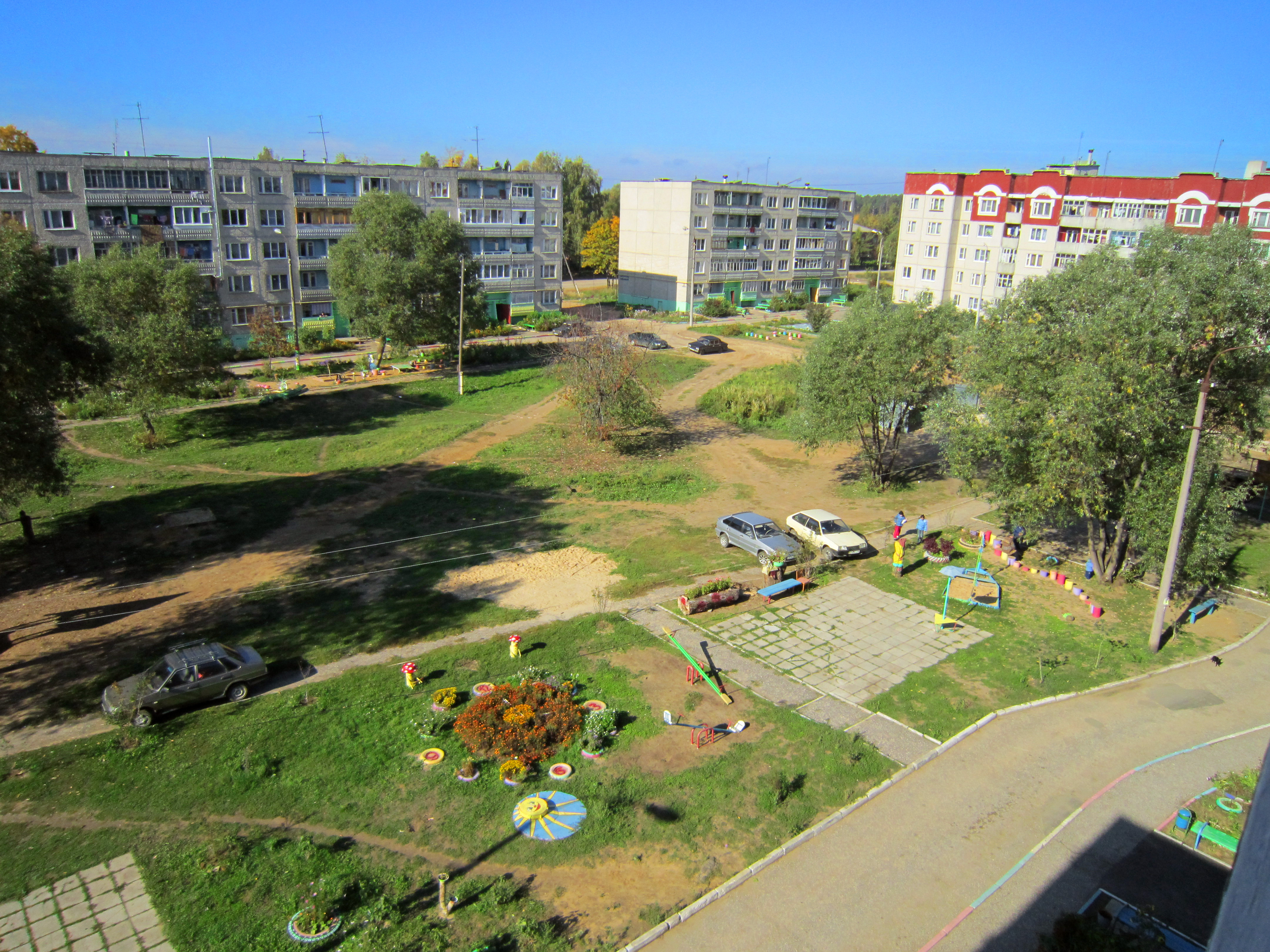
- Kameshkovo, Vladimir Oblast

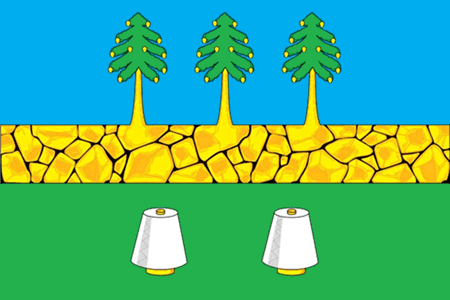
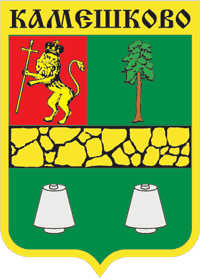
- Flag Coat of arms
- Interactive map of Kameshkovo
- Location of Kameshkovo Kameshkovo (Vladimir Oblast)
- Coordinates: 56°21′N 41°00′E
- Country: Russia
- Federal subject: Vladimir Oblast
- Administrative district: Kameshkovsky District
- beginning of the 20th century
- Town status since: July 12, 1951

Government
  - Body: Council of People's Deputies
- Elevation: 100 m (330 ft)

Population (2010 Census)
  - Total: 13,103
  - Estimate (2021): 12,028 (−8.2%)

Administrative status
  - Capital of: Kameshkovsky District

Municipal status
  - Municipal district: Kameshkovsky Municipal District
  - Urban settlement: Kameshkovo Urban Settlement
  - Capital of: Kameshkovsky Municipal District, Kameshkovo Urban Settlement
- Time zone: UTC+3 (MSK)
- Postal codes: 601300, 601301
- Dialing code: +7 49248
- OKTMO ID: 17625101001
- Website: web.archive.org/web/20131029204001/http://www.kameshkovo33.ru/

Kameshkovo population
- 2021 Census: 12,028
- 2010 Census: 13,103
- 2002 Census: 14,161
- 1989 Census: 15,061
- 1979 Census: 14,080

Kameshkovo (Russian: Ка́мешково) is a town and the administrative center of Kameshkovsky District in Vladimir Oblast, Russia, located 41 kilometers (25 mi) northeast of Vladimir, the administrative center of the oblast. As of the 2021 Census, its population was 12,028.

== History ==
It was founded in the beginning of the 20th century as a settlement around a spinning-and-weaving factory. It was granted town status on July 12, 1951.

== Administrative and municipal status ==
Within the framework of administrative divisions, Kameshkovo serves as the administrative center of Kameshkovsky District, to which it is directly subordinated. As a municipal division, the town of Kameshkovo is incorporated within Kameshkovsky Municipal District as Kameshkovo Urban Settlement.

== Transportation ==
There is a railway station in the town.
