= Kameshkovsky District =

Kameshkovsky District Камешковский район (Russian)
- District
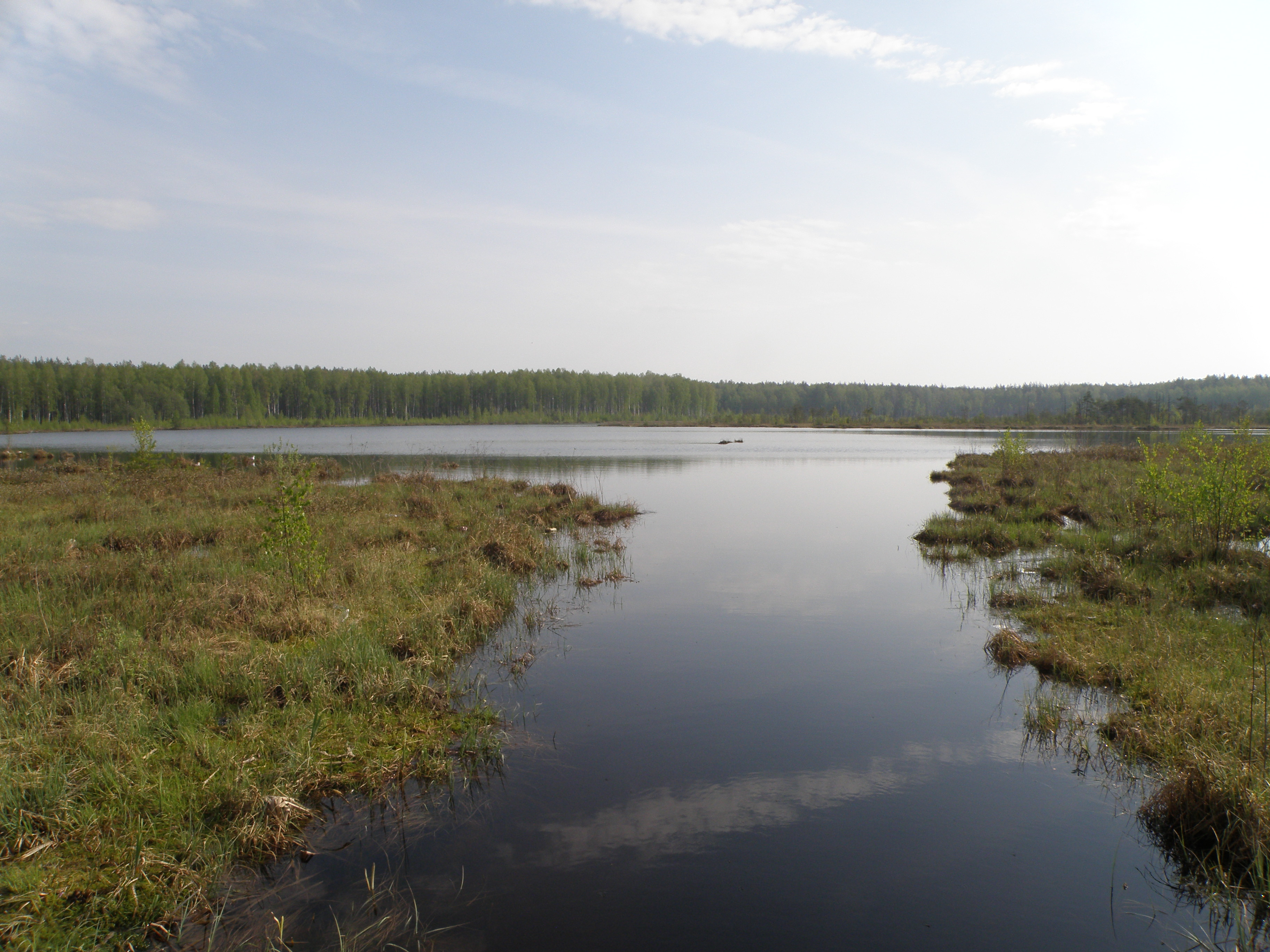
- Daryino Lake (near Novki)

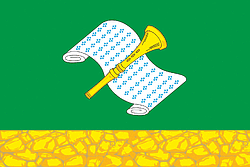
- Flag Coat of arms
- Location of Kameshkovsky District in Vladimir Oblast
- Coordinates: 56°21′N 41°00′E
- Country: Russia
- Federal subject: Vladimir Oblast
- Established: 10 February 1940
- Administrative center: Kameshkovo

Area
  - Total: 1,090 km^{2} (420 sq mi)

Population (2010 Census)
  - Total: 30,466
  - Density: 28.0/km^{2} (72.4/sq mi)
  - Urban: 43.0%
  - Rural: 57.0%

Administrative structure
  - Inhabited localities: 1 cities/towns, 117 rural localities

Municipal structure
  - Municipally incorporated as: Kameshkovsky Municipal District
  - Municipal divisions: 1 urban settlements, 5 rural settlements
- Time zone: UTC+3 (MSK)
- OKTMO ID: 17625000
- Website: http://admkam.ru/

Kameshkovsky District (Russian: Ка́мешковский райо́н) is an administrative and municipal district (raion), one of the sixteen in Vladimir Oblast, Russia. It is located in the north of the oblast. The area of the district is 1,090 square kilometers (420 sq mi). Its administrative center is the town of Kameshkovo. Population: 30,862 (2021 census); 30,466 (2010 census); 37,961 (2002 Census); 42,298 (1989 Soviet census). The population of Kameshkovo accounts for 39.0% of the district's total population.
