= Dagestan =

Republic of Russia

Republic of Dagestan Республика Дагестан (Russian)
- Republic

Other transcription(s)
• Other official names
Name in other languages
- - Avar: Дагъистан Жумгьурият
  - Dargin: Дагъистан Республика
  - Kumyk: Дагъыстан Жумгьурият
  - Lezgian: Дагъустандин Республика
  - Lak: Дагъусттаннал Республика
  - Tabasaran: Дагъустан Республика
  - Rutulian: Республика Дагъустан
  - Aghul: Республика Дагъустан
  - Tsakhur: Республика Дагъустан
  - Nogai: Дагыстан Республикасы
  - Chechen: Дегӏестан Республика
  - Azerbaijani: Дағыстан Республикасы
  - Tat: Республикей Догъисту
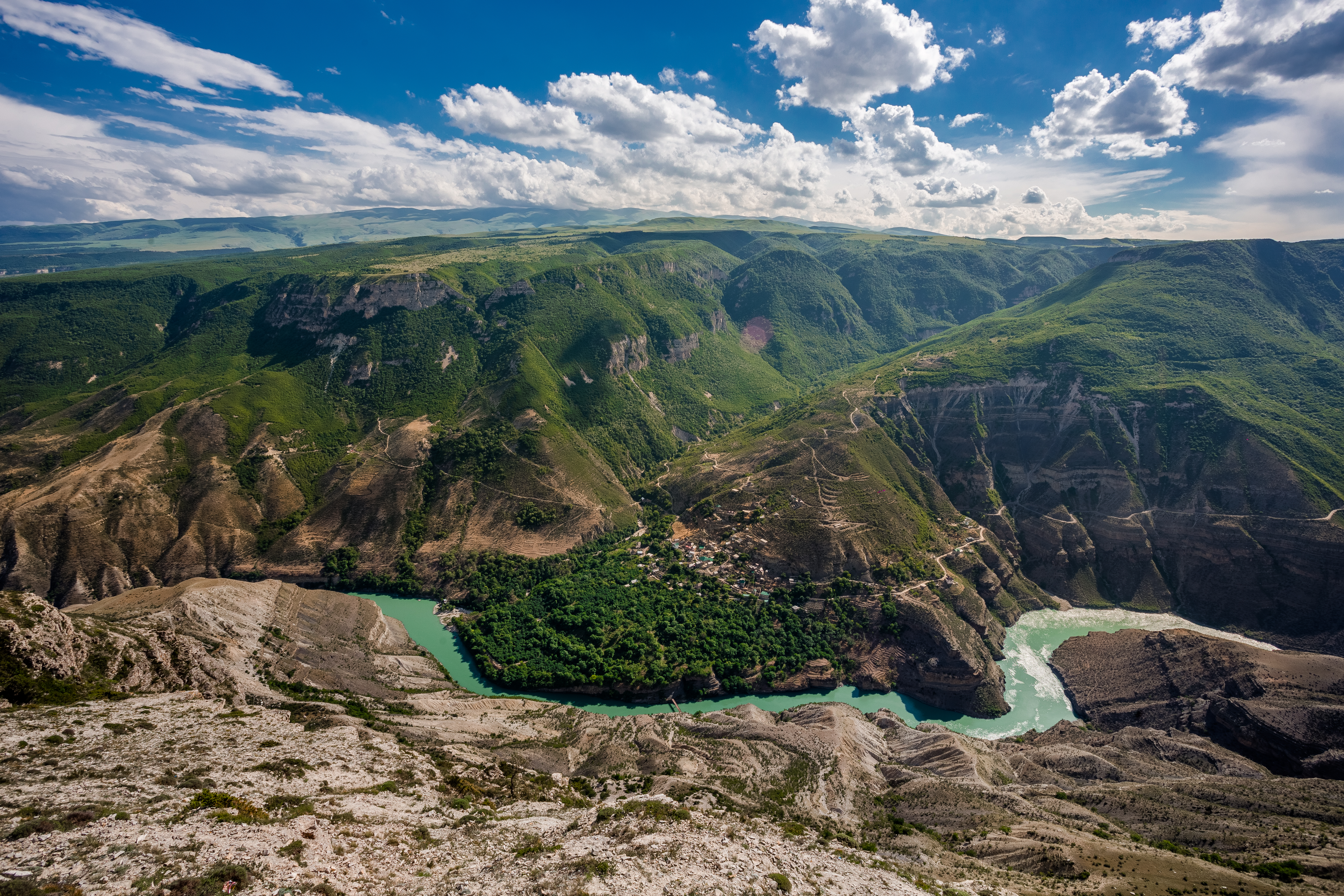
- The Sulak river flowing through the Sulak Canyon

- Flag Coat of arms
- Anthem: "State Anthem of Dagestan" (The Oath)
- Interactive map of Republic of Dagestan
- Coordinates: 42°59′02″N 47°30′18″E
- Country: Russia
- Federal district: North Caucasian
- Economic region: North Caucasus
- Established: January 20, 1921
- Capital: Makhachkala

Government
  - Body: People's Assembly
  - Head: Fyodor Shchukin

Area
  - Total: 50,270 km^{2} (19,410 sq mi)
  - Rank: 52nd

Population (2021 census)
  - Total: 3,182,054 ▲: 30.5% Avars; 16.6% Dargins; 15.8% Kumyks; 13.3% Lezgins; 5.2% Laks; 4% Tabasarans; 3.7% Azerbaijanis; 3.3% Russians; 3.2% Chechens; 1% Rutulians; 3.3% other
  - Estimate (2018): 3,063,885
  - Rank: 10th
  - Density: 63.30/km^{2} (163.9/sq mi)
  - Urban: 45.2%
  - Rural: 54.8%

GDP (nominal, 2024)
  - Total: ₽1.04 trillion (US$12.14 billion)
  - Per capita: ₽321,237 (US$3,769.46)
- Time zone: UTC+3 (MSK)
- ISO 3166 code: RU-DA
- License plates: 05
- OKTMO ID: 82000000
- Official languages: Russian; Aghul; Avar; Azerbaijani; Chechen; Dargwa; Kumyk; Lezgin; Lak; Nogai; Rutulian; Tabasaran; Tat; Tsakhur
- Website: http://www.e-dag.ru/

Dagestan, (Note: /ˌdæɡɪˈstæn, -ˈstɑːn/ DAG-i-STA(H)N; Russian: Дагестан; IPA: [dəɡʲɪˈstan]) officially the Republic of Dagestan, (Note: Russian: Республика Дагестан, romanized: Respublika Dagestan) is a republic of Russia situated in the North Caucasus of Eastern Europe, along the Caspian Sea. It is located north of the Greater Caucasus, and is a part of the North Caucasian Federal District. The republic is at the southernmost tip of Russia, sharing land borders with the countries of Azerbaijan (south) and Georgia (southwest), and the Russian federal subjects of Chechnya (west), Stavropol Krai (northwest), and Kalmykia (north). Makhachkala is the republic's capital and largest city; other major cities are Derbent, Kizlyar, Izberbash, Kaspiysk, and Buynaksk.

Dagestan covers an area of 50,300 square kilometres (19,400 square miles), with a population of over 3.1 million, consisting of over 30 ethnic groups and 81 nationalities. With 14 official languages, and 12 ethnic groups each constituting more than 1% of its total population, the republic is one of Russia's most linguistically and ethnically diverse, and one of the most heterogeneous administrative divisions in the world. Most of the residents speak one of the Northeast Caucasian or Turkic languages, making up 75% and 21% of population, respectively; however, Russian is the primary language and the lingua franca in the republic. Dagestan is known internationally for its strong culture of combat sambo, with many of its fighters having later turned to mixed martial arts.

== Toponymy ==
The word Dagestan is of Turkic and Persian origin, directly translating to "land of the mountains". The Turkic word dağ means "mountain", and the Persian suffix -stan means "land".

Some areas of Dagestan were known as Lekia, Avaria and Tarki at various times.

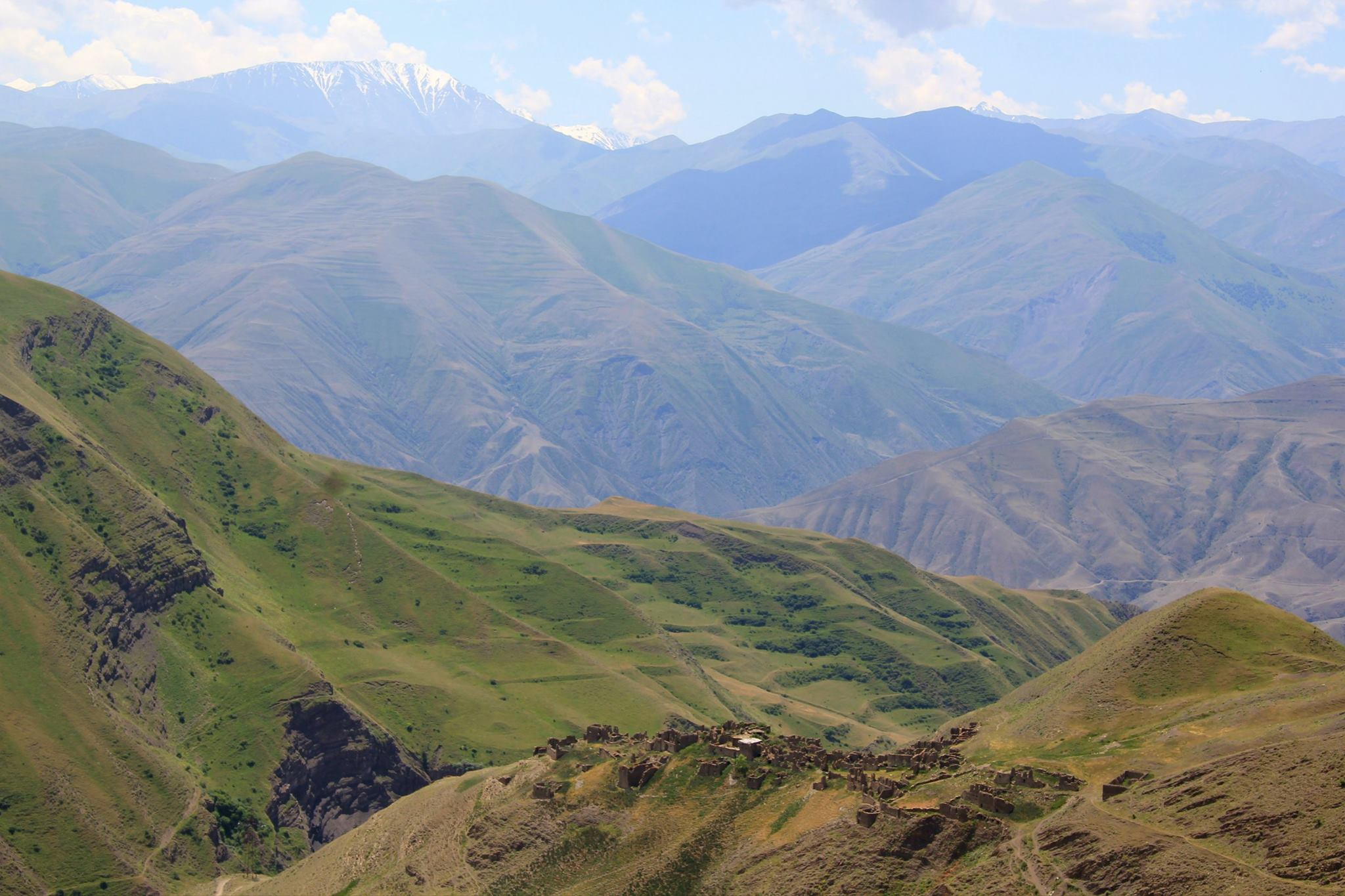
Abandoned Lezgin village of Grar

Between 1860 and 1920, Dagestan was referred to as Dagestan Oblast, corresponding to the southeastern part of the present-day republic. The current borders were created with the establishment of the Dagestan Autonomous Soviet Socialist Republic in 1921, with the incorporation of the eastern part of Terek Oblast, which is not mountainous but includes the Terek littoral at the southern end of the Caspian Depression.

=== Names in its official languages ===
- Russian – Республика Дагестан (Respublika Dagestan)
- Avar – Дагъистан Республика (Daġistan Respublika)
- Dargin – Дагъистан Республика (Daġistan Respublika)
- Kumyk – Дагъыстан Жумгьурият (Республика) (Dağıstan Cumhuriyat / Respublika)
- Lezgian – Республика Дагъустан (Respublika Daġustan)
- Lak – Дагъусттаннал Республика (Daġusttannal Respublika)
- Tabasaran – Дагъустан Республика (Daġustan Respublika)
- Rutulian – Республика Дагъустан (Respublika Daġustan)
- Aghul – Республика Дагъустан (Respublika Daġustan)
- Tsakhur – Республика Дагъустан (Respublika Daġustan)
- Nogai – Дагыстан Республикасы (Dağıstan Respublikası)
- Chechen – Дегӏестан Республика (Deġestan Respublika)
- Azerbaijani – Дағыстан Республикасы (Dağıstan Respublikası)
- Tat – Республикей Догъисту (Respublikei Doġistu)

== History ==
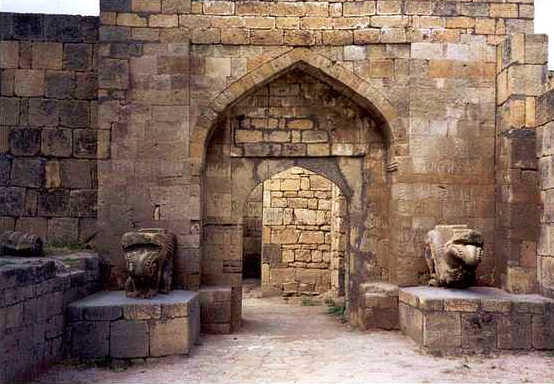
Inside the Persian fortress of Derbent, a World Heritage Site

=== Antiquity ===
In the first few centuries AD, Caucasian Albania (corresponding to modern Azerbaijan and southern Dagestan) became a vassal and eventually subordinate to the Parthian Empire. With the advent of the Sasanian Empire, it became a satrapy (province) within the vast domains of the empire. In later antiquity, a few wars were fought as the Roman Empire unsuccessfully attempted to contest Sasanid rule over the region. Over the centuries, to a relatively large extent, the peoples within the Dagestan territory converted to Christianity alongside Zoroastrianism.

In the 5th century, the Sassanids gained the upper hand, and by the 6th century had constructed a strong citadel at Derbent, known from then on as the Caspian Gates, while the Huns overran the northern part of Dagestan, followed by the Caucasian Avars. During the Sassanian era, southern Dagestan became a bastion of Persian culture and civilization, with its center at Derbent. A policy of "Persianisation" can be traced over many centuries.

=== Middle ages and Islamisation ===
During the Islamic conquests, the Dagestani people (region of Derbent) were the first people to become Muslims within current Russian territory, after the Arab conquest of the region in 643. In the 8th century Arabs repeatedly clashed with the Khazars. Although the local population rose against the Arabs of Derbent in 905 and 913, Islam was still adopted in urban centers, such as Samandar and Kubachi (Zerechgeran), from where it steadily diffused into the highlands. By the 15th century, Christianity had died away, leaving a 10th-century Church of Datuna as the sole monument to its existence.

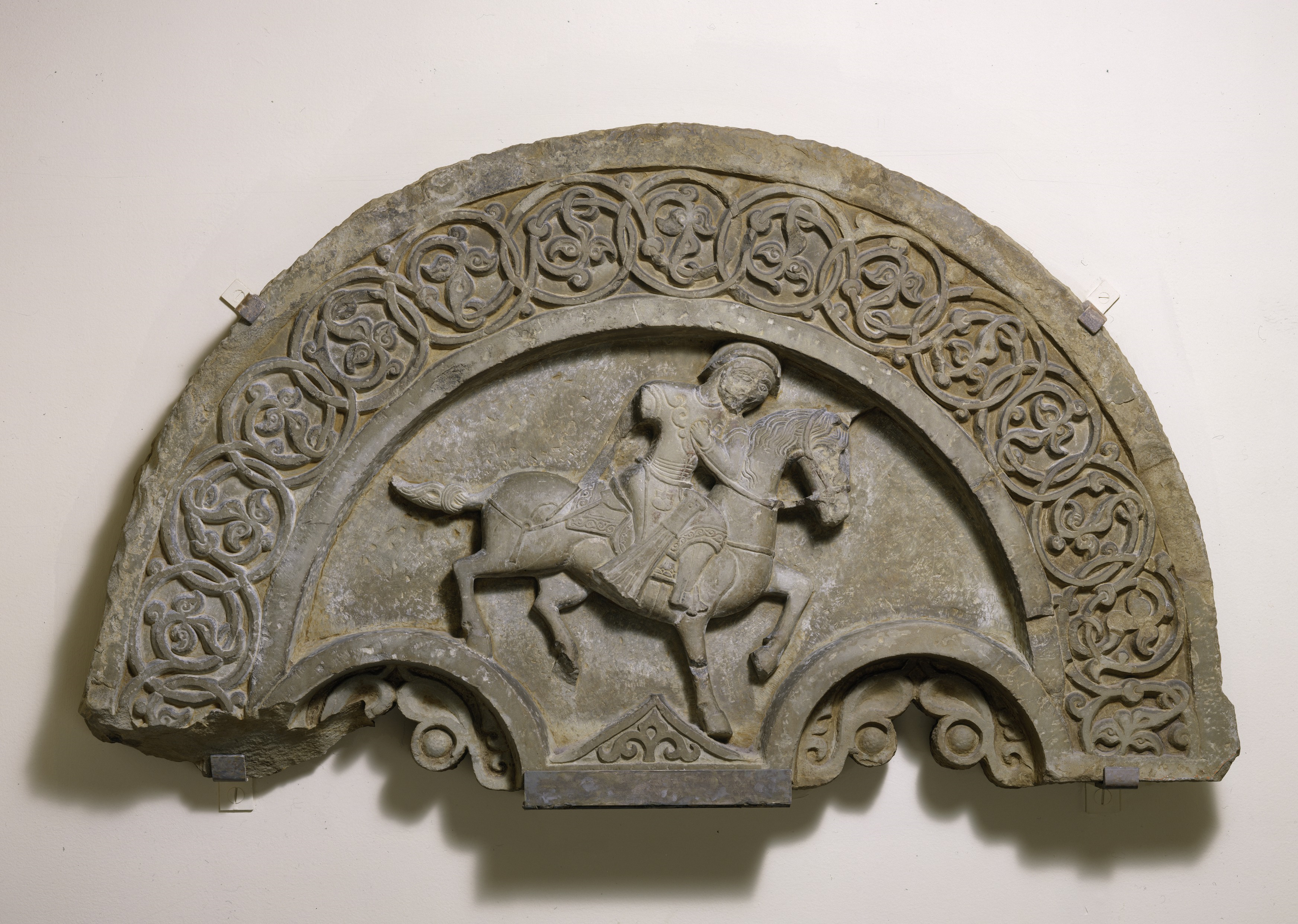
Mongol horserider with "cloud collar", House of Ahmad and Ibrahim, Kubachi in the Caucasus, second half 14th century CE

In the second half of the 11th century, the Seljuk Turks took part of the region of Dagestan under their control.

The Mongols raided the lands in 1221–1222 then conquered Derbent and the surrounding area from 1236 to 1239 during the invasions of Georgia and Durdzuketia. The Timurids incorporated the region into their realm following the Mongols in the 14th century.

=== Early modern ===
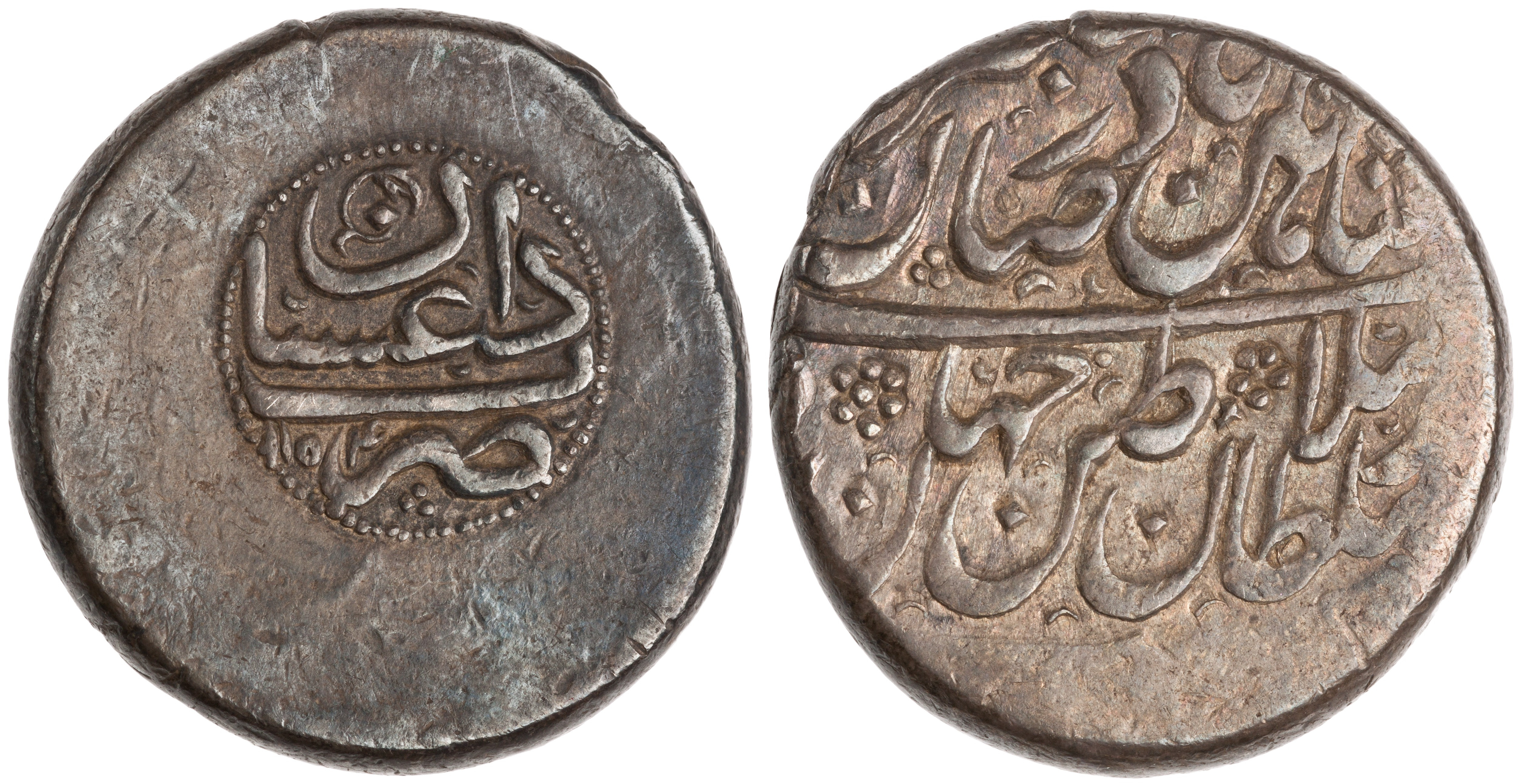
Silver coin of Nader Shah, minted in Dagestan, dated 1741–42 (left = obverse; right = reverse)

As Mongolian authority gradually eroded, new centers of power emerged in Kaitagi and Tarki. In the early 16th century, the Persians (under the Safavids) reconsolidated their rule over the region, which would, intermittently, last till the early 19th century. In the 16th and 17th centuries, legal traditions were codified, and mountainous communities (djamaats) obtained considerable autonomy. In the 1720s, as a result of the disintegration of the Safavids and the Russo-Persian War (1722–1723), the Russians briefly annexed maritime Dagestan from the Safavids. The Russians could not hold on to the interior of Dagestan, and could only be stopped in front of Baku with the help of Ottoman forces under the command of Mustafa Pasha. With a treaty signed between Russia and the Ottoman Empire in 1724, aimed at dividing the territories of Safavid Iran between them, Derbend, Baku and some other places in the region were left to Russia. Dagestan briefly came under Ottoman rule between 1578 and 1606. The territories were however returned to Persia in 1735 per the Treaty of Ganja.

Between 1730 and the early course of the 1740s, following his brother's murder in Dagestan, the new Persian ruler and military genius Nader Shah led a lengthy campaign in swaths of Dagestan in order to fully conquer the region, which was met with considerable success, although eventually he was forced to withdraw due to the extremity of the weather, the outbreak of disease and heavy raids by the various ethnic groups of Dagestan, forcing him to retreat with his army. From 1747 onwards, the Persian-ruled part of Dagestan was administered through the Derbent Khanate, with its center at Derbent. The Persian expedition of 1796 resulted in the Russian capture of Derbent in 1796. However, the Russians were again forced to retreat from the entire Caucasus following internal governmental problems, allowing Persia to capture the territory again.

=== Russian rule consolidated ===
It was not until the aftermath of the Russo-Persian War (1804–1813) that Russian power over Dagestan was confirmed, and that Qajar Persia officially ceded the territory to Russia. In 1813, following Russia's victory in the war, Persia was forced to cede southern Dagestan with its principal city of Derbent, alongside other vast territories in the Caucasus to Russia, conforming with the Treaty of Gulistan. The 1828 Treaty of Turkmenchay indefinitely consolidated Russian control over Dagestan and removed Persia from the military equation.

=== Resistance against Imperial Russia ===
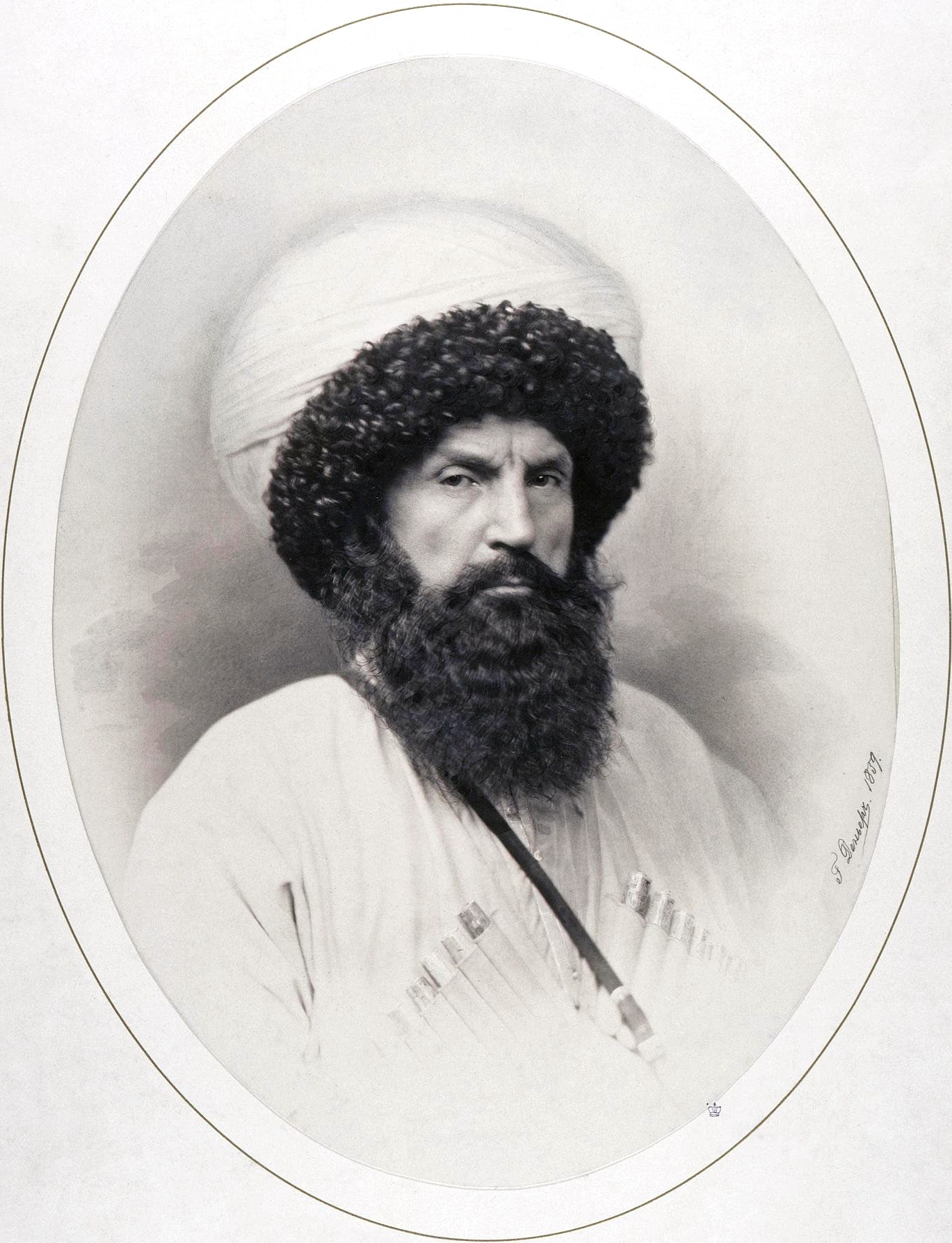
Imam Shamil, national hero and freedom fighter

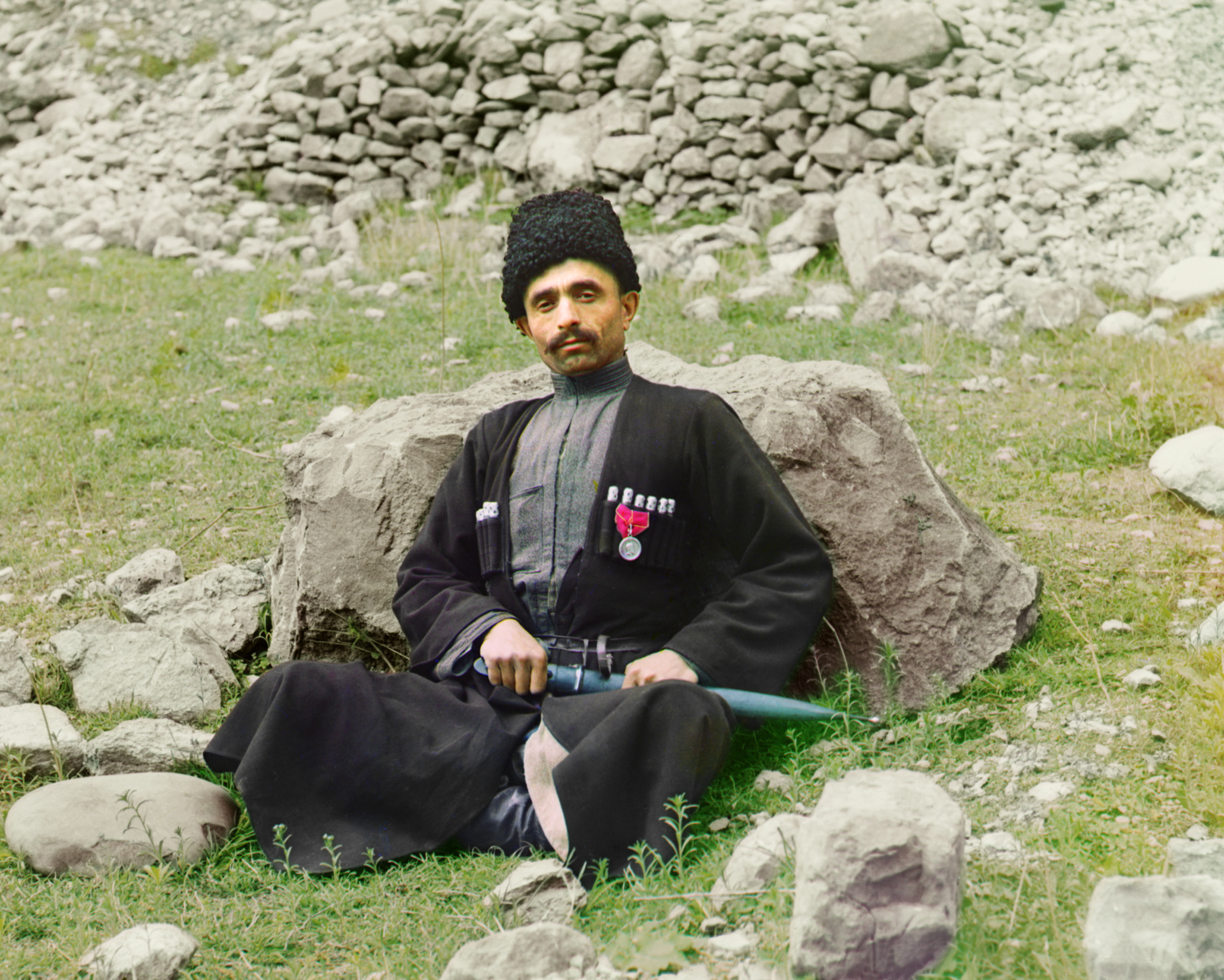
Dagestani man, photographed by Sergey Prokudin-Gorsky, between 1907 and 1915

The Russian administration, however, disappointed and embittered the highlanders. The institution of heavy taxation, coupled with the expropriation of estates and the construction of fortresses (including Makhachkala), electrified highlanders into rising under the aegis of the Muslim Imamate of Dagestan, led by Ghazi Mohammed (1828–1832), Hamzat Bek (1832–1834) and Shamil (1834–1859). This Caucasian War raged until 1864.

Dagestan and Chechnya profited from the Russo-Turkish War (1877–1878), rising together against the Russian Empire. Chechnya rose again at various times throughout the late 19th and 20th centuries.

=== Soviet period ===
On December 21, 1917, Ingushetia, Chechnya, Dagestan and the rest of the North Caucasus declared independence from Russia and formed a single state called the "United Mountain Dwellers of the North Caucasus" (also known as the Mountainous Republic of the Northern Caucasus). The capital of the new state was moved to Temir-Khan-Shura. The first prime minister of the state was Tapa Chermoyev, a prominent Chechen statesman. The second prime minister was an Ingush statesman Vassan-Girey Dzhabagiev, who in 1917 also became the author of the constitution of the land, and in 1920 was re-elected for a third term. After the Bolshevik Revolution, Ottoman armies occupied Azerbaijan and Dagestan and the region became part of the short-lived Mountainous Republic of the Northern Caucasus. After more than three years of fighting the White Army and local nationalists, the Bolsheviks achieved victory and the Dagestan Autonomous Soviet Socialist Republic was proclaimed on January 20, 1921. As the newly created Soviet Union was consolidating control in the region, Dagestan declared itself a republic within the Russian Soviet federation but did not follow the other ASSRs in declaring sovereignty.

=== Post-Soviet period ===
On August 7, 1999, the Islamic International Peacekeeping Brigade (IIPB), an Islamist group from Chechnya led by warlords Shamil Basayev, Ibn Al-Khattab and Ramzan Akhmadov, launched a military invasion of Dagestan, in support of the Shura separatist rebels with the aim of creating an "independent Islamic State of Dagestan".

The invaders were supported by part of the local population but were driven back by the Russian military and local paramilitary groups. In response to the invasion, Russian forces subsequently reinvaded Chechnya later that year.

Dagestan has one of the highest unemployment rates in Russia.

Dagestani soldiers participated in the 2022 Russian invasion of Ukraine, many of whom were killed in action. In September, Dagestan became a center of the 2022 North Caucasian protests against mobilization.

== Geography ==
Federal subjects in the Black Sea-Caspian area.
- the North Caucasus Federal District's republics: Karachay-Cherkessia, Kabardino-Balkaria, North Ossetia-Alania, Ingushetia, Chechnya and Dagestan
- to the north and west: the Southern Federal District

The republic is situated in the North Caucasus mountains. It is the southernmost part of Russia and is bordered on its eastern side by the Caspian Sea. With an area of 50,300 km^{2} (19,400 sq mi), it borders Kalmykia (N), Chechnya (W), and Stavropol Krai (NW) internally, and Azerbaijan (Balakan District, Khachmaz District, Oghuz District, Qabala District, Qakh District, Qusar District, Shaki District and Zaqatala District) (S), Georgia (Kakheti) (SW) externally. To the east is the Caspian Sea.

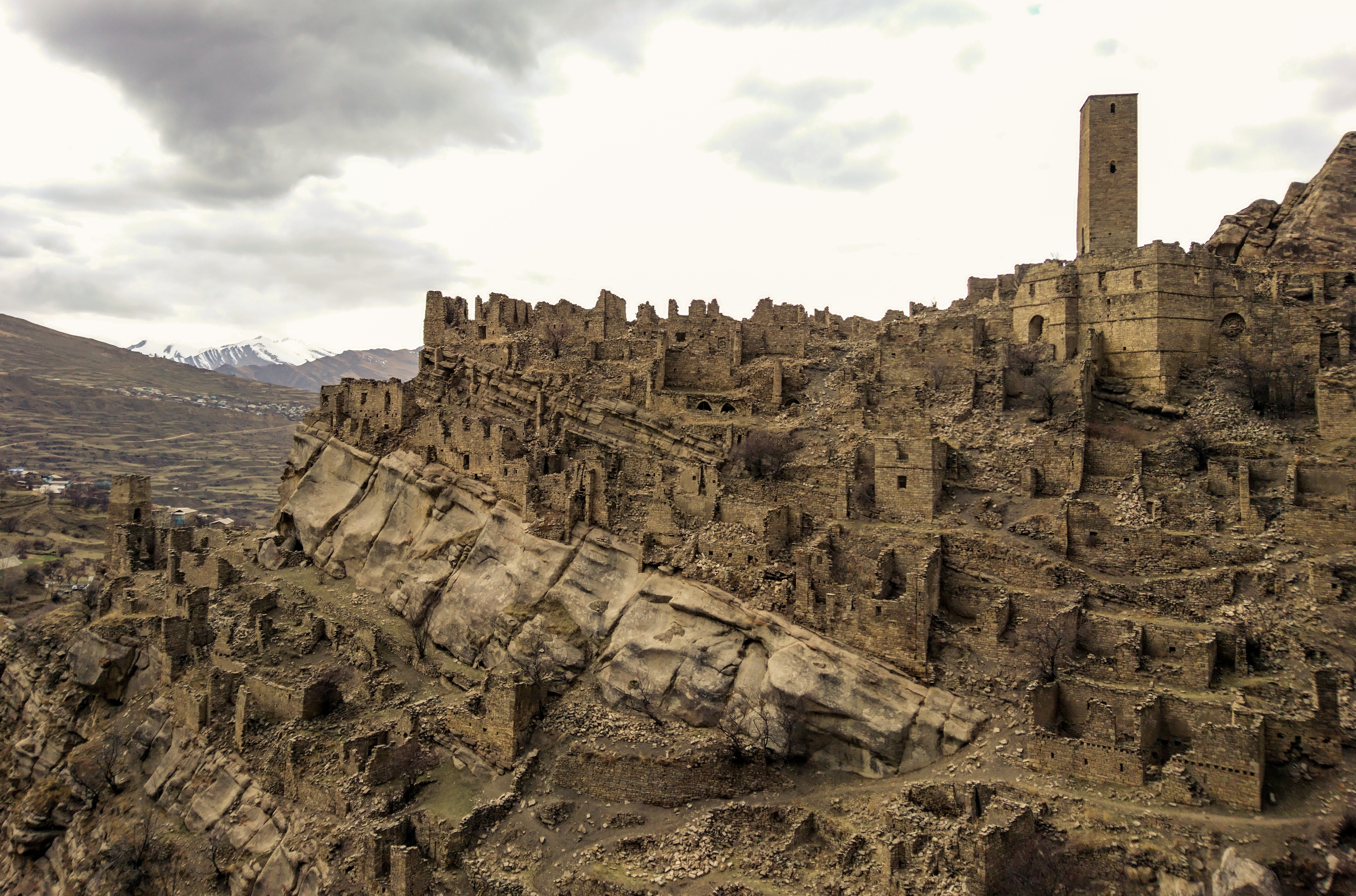
Kakhib, one of many abandoned auls in Dagestan

The highest point in the republic is Mount Bazardüzü/Bazardyuzyu (4,446 metres (14,587 ft)). The maximum north–south distance is 400 kilometers (250 mi) while the maximum east–west distance is 200 kilometers (120 mi).

=== Rivers ===
There are over 1,800 rivers in the republic. Major rivers include:

- Akhtychay
- Andi Koisu
- Avar Koisu
- Kazi-Kumukh Koisu
- Rubas River
- Samur River
- Sulak River
- Terek River
- Ulluchay

=== Lakes ===
Dagestan has about 405 kilometers (252 mi) of coastline on the world's largest inland sea, the Caspian Sea.

=== Mountains ===
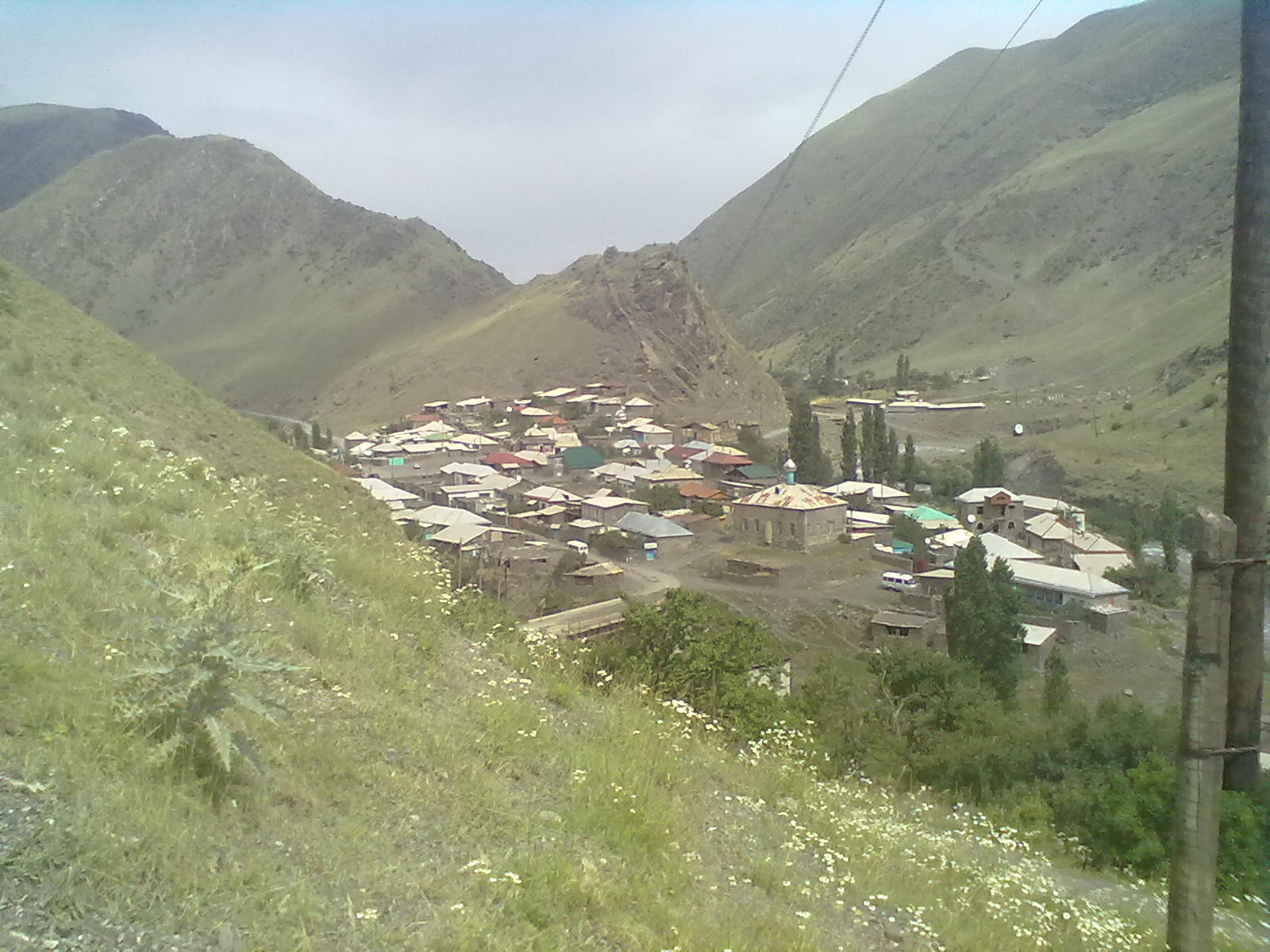
Rutulian village Luchek

Most of Dagestan is mountainous, with the Greater Caucasus Mountains covering the south of the republic. The highest point is the Bazardüzü/Bazardyuzyu peak at 4,470 meters (14,670 ft), on the border with Azerbaijan. The southernmost point of Russia is located about seven kilometers southwest of the peak. Other important mountains are Diklosmta (4,285 m (14,058 ft)), Gora Addala Shukgelmezr (4,152 m (13,622 ft)) and Gora Dyultydag (4,127 m (13,540 ft)). The town of Kumukh is one of the settlements on the mountains.

=== Natural resources ===
Dagestan is rich in oil, natural gas, coal, and many other minerals and resources.

=== Climate ===
The climate is classified as a continental climate, with a significant lack of precipitation. It is among the warmest places in Russia. In the mountainous regions, it is subarctic.

- Average January temperature: +2 °C (36 °F)
- Average July temperature: +26 °C (79 °F)
- Average annual precipitation: 250 mm (10 in) (northern plains) to 800 mm (31 in) (in the mountains).

== Administrative divisions ==
Dagestan is divided into 41 administrative districts (raions) and ten cities/towns. The districts are further subdivided into 19 urban-type settlements, and 363 rural okrugs and stanitsa okrugs.

== Politics ==
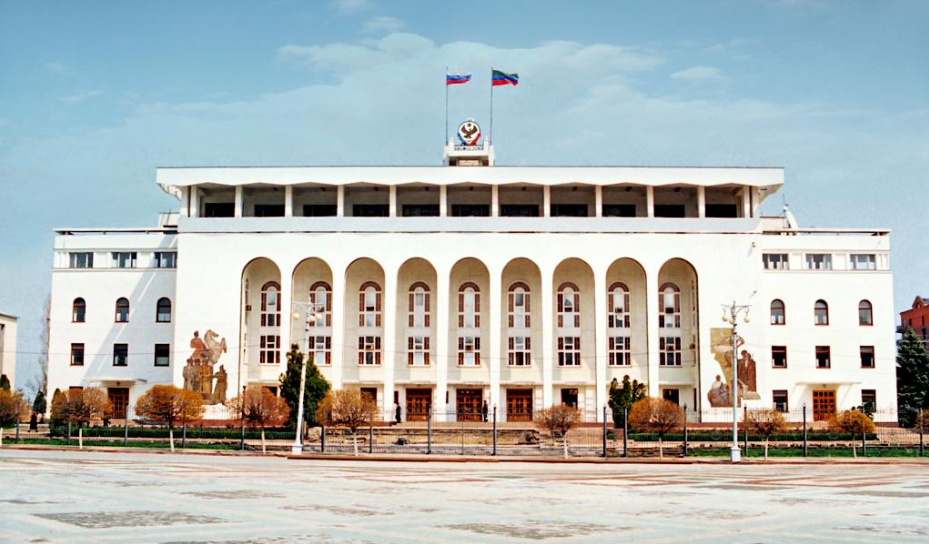
The Government Building of the Republic of Dagestan

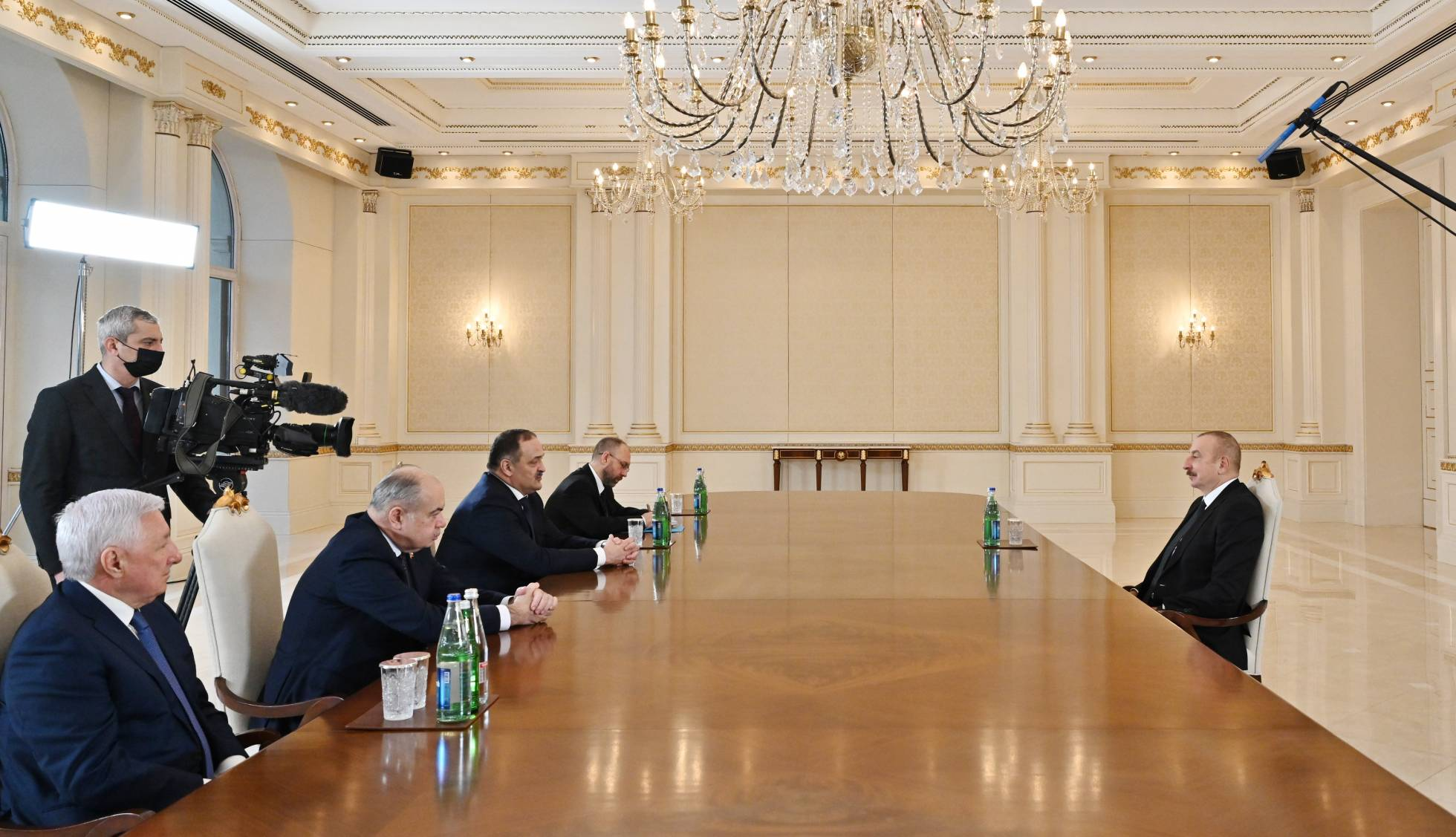
Sergey Melikov, the Head of Dagestan, with Azerbaijan's President Ilham Aliyev on 6 December 2022

The parliament of Dagestan is the People's Assembly, consisting of 72 deputies elected for a four-year term. The People's Assembly is the highest executive and legislative body of the republic.

The Constitution of Dagestan was adopted on July 10, 2003. According to it, the highest executive authority lies with the State Council, comprising representatives of fourteen ethnicities. The Constitutional Assembly of Dagestan appoints the members of the State Council for a term of four years. The State Council appoints the members of the Government.

The ethnicities represented in the State Council are Avars, Dargins, Kumyks, Lezgins, Laks, Azerbaijanis, Tabasarans, Russians, Chechens, Nogais, Aguls, Rutulians, Tsakhurs, and Tats.

Formerly, the Chairman of the State Council was the highest executive post in the republic, held by Magomedali Magomedovich Magomedov until 2006. On February 20, 2006, the People's Assembly passed a resolution terminating this post and disbanding the State Council. Russian president, Vladimir Putin offered the People's Assembly the candidature of Mukhu Aliyev for the newly established post of the president of the Republic of Dagestan. The People's Assembly accepted the nomination, and Mukhu Aliyev became the first president of the republic. On February 20, 2010, Aliyev was replaced by Magomedsalam Magomedov. Ramazan Abdulatipov then became the head (acting 2013–2017, following the resignation of Magomedov). On October 3, 2017, Vladimir Vasilyev was appointed and served as head until October 5, 2020.

In the 2024 Russian presidential election, which critics called rigged and fraudulent, President Vladimir Putin won 92.93% of the vote in Dagestan.

== Human rights ==
Dagestan, like much of the North Caucasus, is considered to be a part of peripheral Russia and affected by weak governance, corruption and conflict, resulting in widespread human rights abuses. These include abuses in counter‑terrorism operations, killings and intimidation of journalists and activists, and systemic discrimination against women in family law (including the denial of a right to family life, where courts often side with patrilineal kin against mothers). Examples of violence against women include honour killings, enforced disappearances and torture, bride-kidnapping and female genital cutting (the latter is more common in remote mountain regions).

Human Rights Watch has documented arbitrary detention, enforced disappearances, and torture by security forces, alongside harassment of lawyers and human-rights defenders, particularly between 2012 and 2015, in the context of the insurgency in the North Caucasus.

Russian anti-LGBTQ legislation intersects with conservative Islamic social norms in the region. According to the human rights groups North Caucasus SOS and Marem, gay men in Dagestan are frequently abducted by police and subjected to torture by authorities; this was especially true during the broader anti-gay purges in the North Caucasus, including Chechnya.

In 2023, during the Gaza war, there were a wave of antisemitic attacks across the North Caucasus, including Dagestan.

== Demographics ==
Because its mountainous terrain impedes travel and communication, Dagestan is unusually ethnically diverse and still largely tribal. It is Russia's most heterogeneous republic. Dagestan's population is rapidly growing.

Historical population
Year	Pop.	±%
1897	571,154	—
1926	787,883	+37.9%
1939	1,023,300	+29.9%
1959	1,062,472	+3.8%
1970	1,428,540	+34.5%
1979	1,627,884	+14.0%
1989	1,802,579	+10.7%
2002	2,576,531	+42.9%
2010	2,910,249	+13.0%
2021	3,182,054	+9.3%
2025	3,259,890	+2.4%
Sources: Census data, estimate

=== Population ===
3,182,054 (2021 census); 2,910,249 (2010 census); 2,576,531 (2002 census); 1,802,579 (1989 Soviet census).

=== Life expectancy ===
Dagestan has the second highest life expectancy in Russia. Higher duration of life is observed only in Ingushetia.

	2019	2021
Average:	79.1 years	76.6 years
Male:	76.6 years	74.1 years
Female:	81.4 years	79.0 years

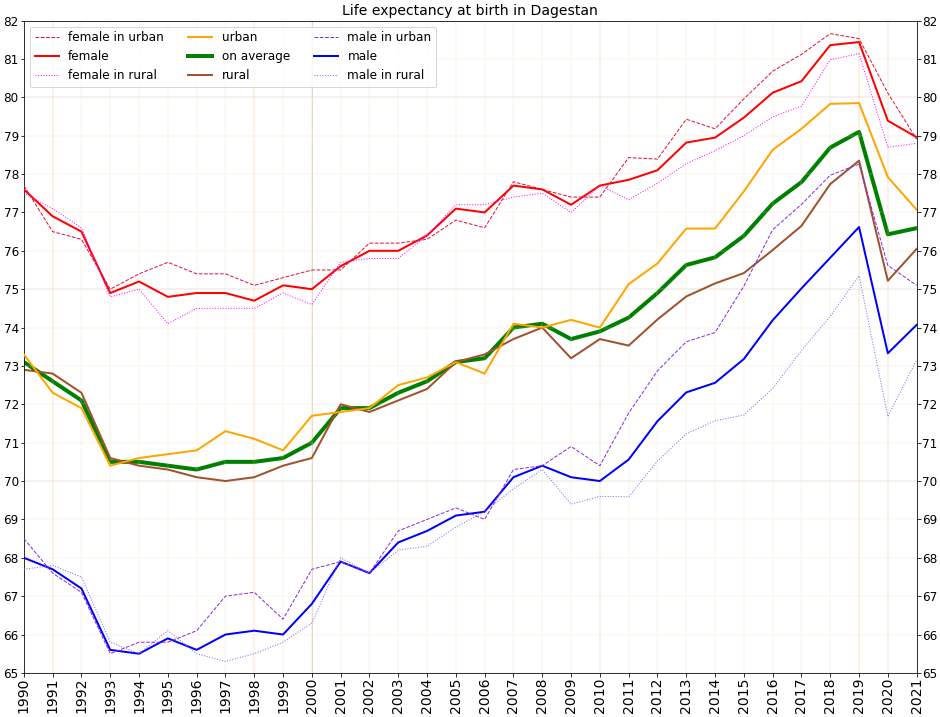
Life expectancy at birth in Dagestan

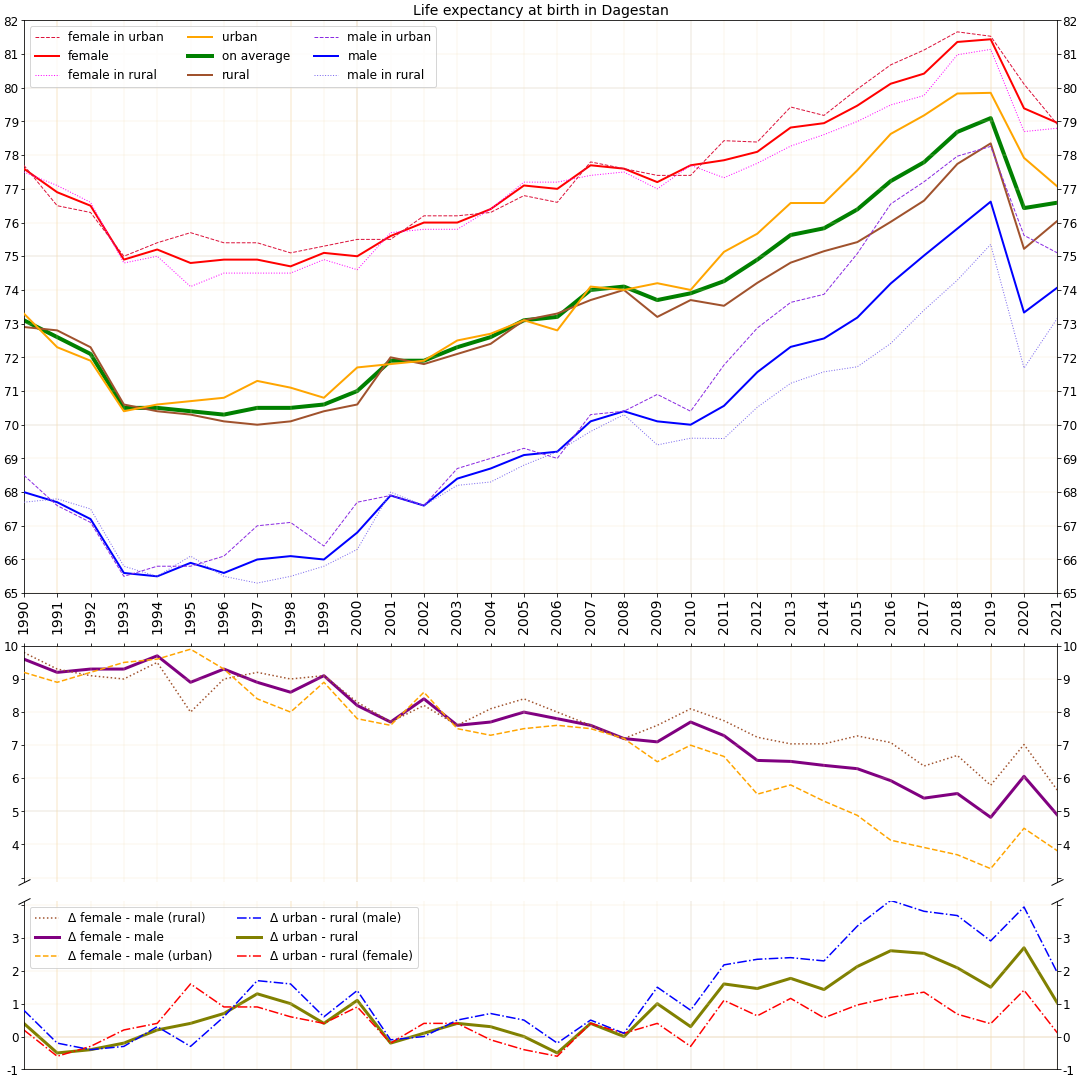
Life expectancy with calculated differences

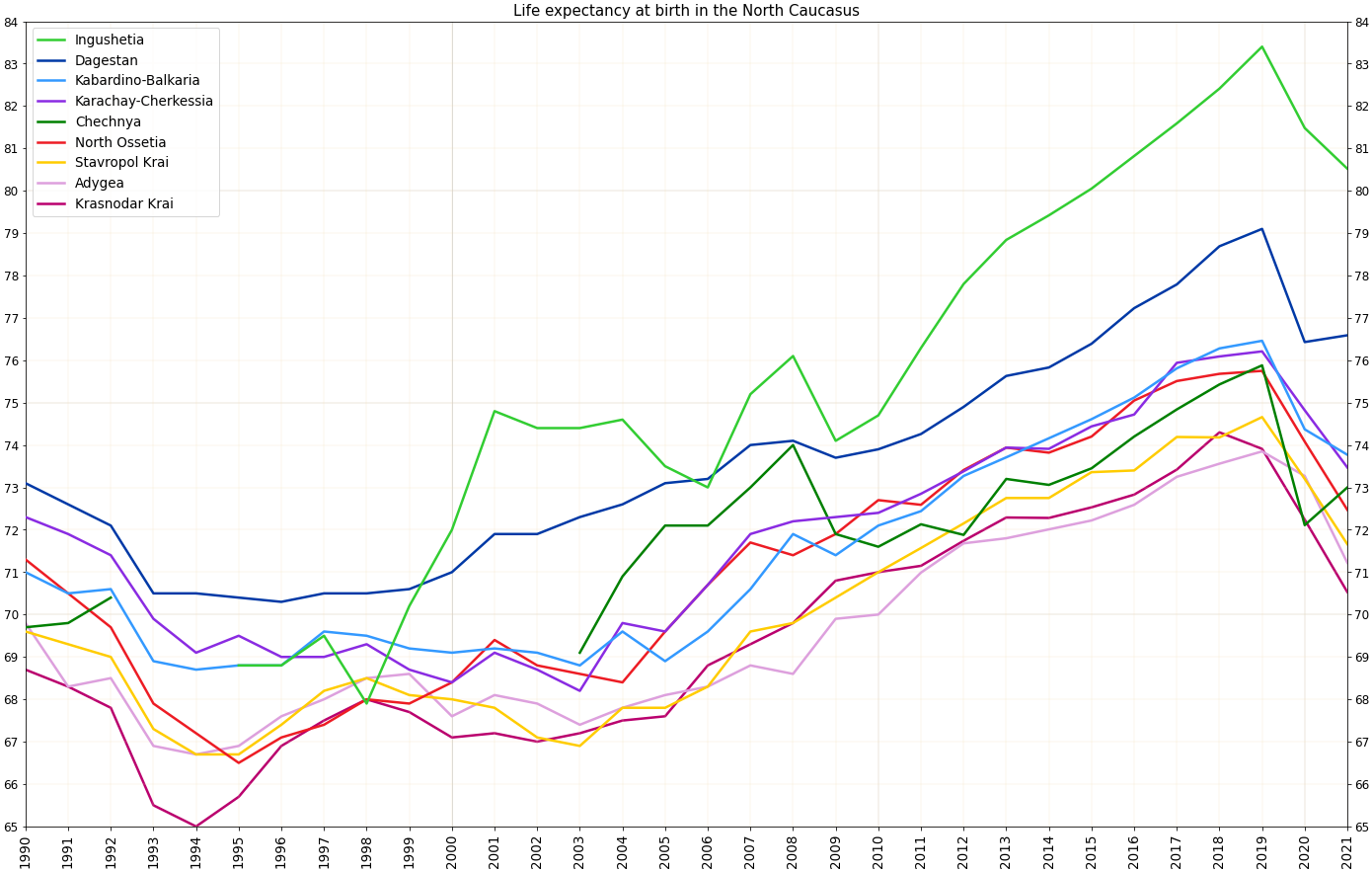
Life expectancy in Dagestan in comparison with other regions of the North Caucasus

Interactive chart of comparison of male and female life expectancy for 2021. Open the original svg-file in a separate window and hover over a bubble to highlight it.

Analogious interactive chart of comparison of urban and rural life expectancy.
Original interactive file.

=== Settlements ===
Largest cities or towns in Dagestan 2021 Russian Census
Rank		Administrative Division	Pop.
1	Makhachkala	City of republic significance of Makhachkala	623,254
2	Khasavyurt	Khasavyurtovsky District	155,144
3	Derbent	Derbentsky District	124,953
4	Kaspiysk	City of republic significance of Kaspiysk	121,140
5	Buynaksk	Buynaksky District	68,121
6	Izberbash	Town of republic significance of Izberbash	55,996
7	Kizlyar	Kizlyarsky District	49,999
8	Kizilyurt	Kizilyurtovsky District	38,335
9	Dagestanskiye Ogni	Town of republic significance of Dagestanskiye Ogni	31,412
10	Karabudakhkent	Karabudakhkentsky District	20,710

=== Vital statistics ===
Map of Dagestan

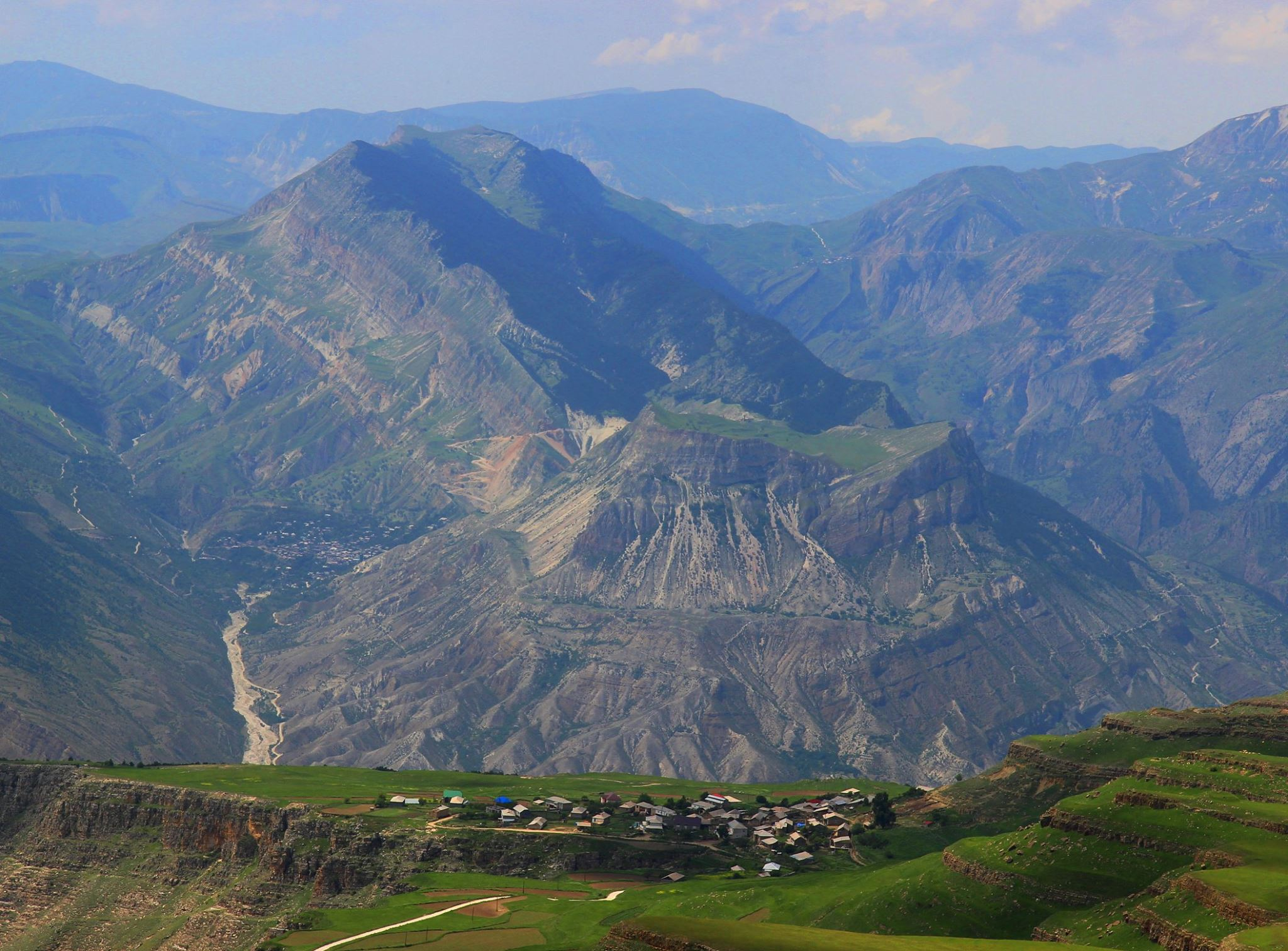
A mountain village

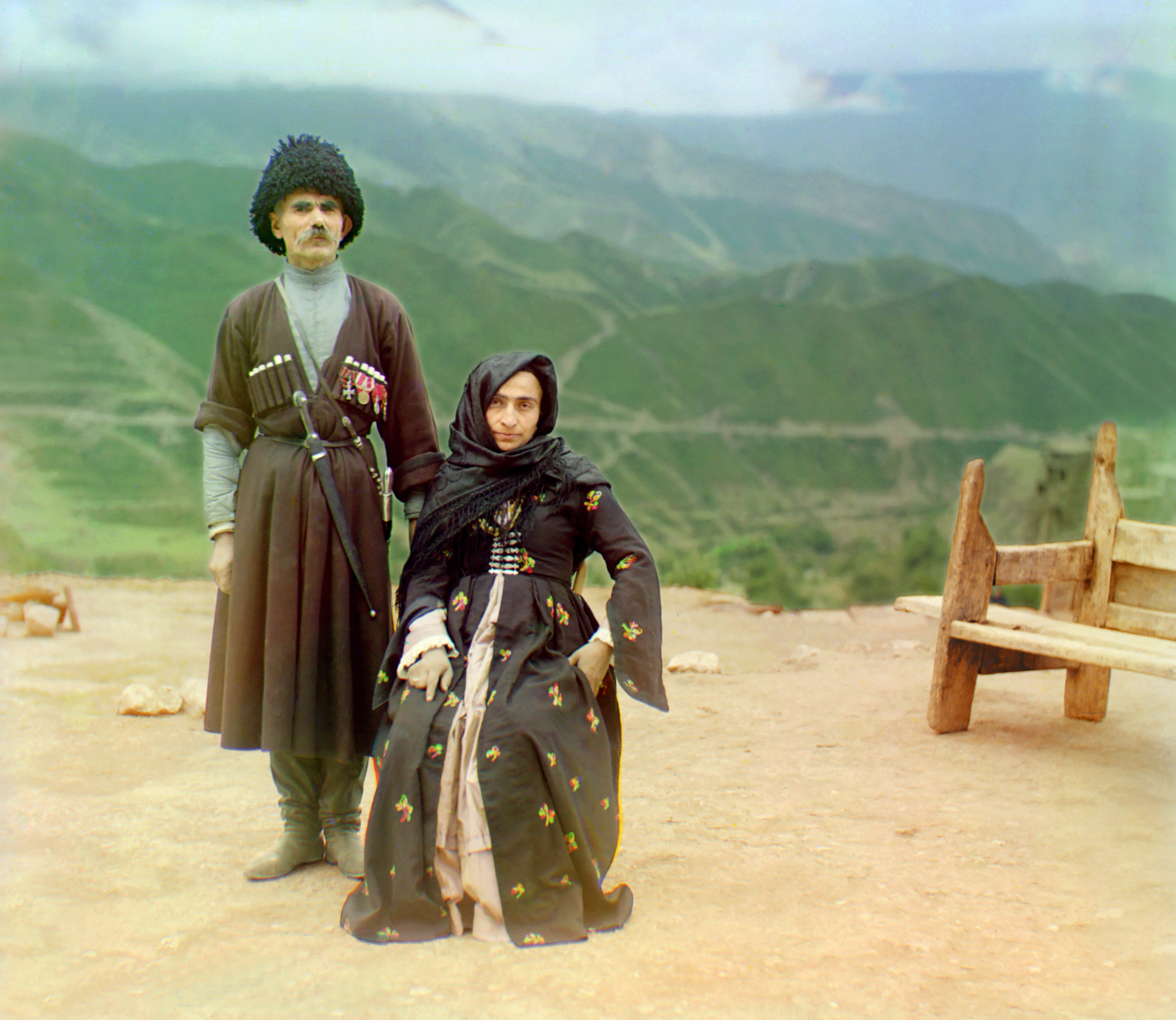
A couple in Dagestan, as photographed by Sergey Prokudin-Gorsky between 1907 and 1915

Source: Russian Federal State Statistics Service

	Average population (x 1000)	Live births	Deaths	Natural change	Crude birth rate (per 1000)	Crude death rate (per 1000)	Natural change (per 1000)	Fertility rates
1970	1,438	41,381	9,543	31,838	28.8	6.6	22.1	
1975	1,544	42,098	10,292	31,806	27.3	6.7	20.6	
1980	1,655	44,088	11,188	32,900	26.6	6.8	19.9	
1985	1,744	50,053	12,010	38,043	28.7	6.9	21.8	
1990	1,848	48,209	11,482	36,727	26.1	6.2	19.9	3.07
1991	1,906	47,461	12,062	35,399	24.9	6.3	18.6	2.94
1992	1,964	44,986	12,984	32,002	22.9	6.6	16.3	2.70
1993	2,012	41,863	14,777	27,086	20.8	7.3	13.5	2.46
1994	2,117	44,472	15,253	29,219	21.0	7.2	13.8	2.45
1995	2,209	45,680	15,700	29,980	20.7	7.1	13.6	2.41
1996	2,251	42,282	15,565	26,717	18.8	6.9	11.9	2.19
1997	2,308	41,225	15,662	25,563	17.9	6.8	11.1	2.10
1998	2,363	41,164	15,793	25,371	17.4	6.7	10.7	2.05
1999	2,417	38,281	16,020	22,261	15.8	6.6	9.2	1.87
2000	2,464	38,229	16,108	22,121	15.5	6.5	9.0	1.82
2001	2,511	38,480	15,293	23,187	15.3	6.1	9.2	1.79
2002	2,563	41,204	15,887	25,317	16.1	6.2	9.9	1.85
2003	2,609	41,490	15,929	25,561	15.9	6.1	9.8	1.81
2004	2,647	41,573	15,724	25,849	15.7	5.9	9.8	1.76
2005	2,684	40,814	15,585	25,229	15.2	5.8	9.4	1.69
2006	2,721	40,646	15,939	24,707	14.9	5.9	9.1	1.64
2007	2,761	45,470	15,357	30,113	16.5	5.6	10.9	1.81
2008	2,804	49,465	15,794	33,671	17.6	5.6	12.0	1.94
2009	2,850	50,416	16,737	33,679	17.7	5.9	11.8	1.92
2010	2,896	52,057	17,013	35,044	18.0	5.9	12.1	1.92
2011	2,914	54,646	16,872	37,774	18.1	5.8	12.3	1.98
2012	2,931	56,186	16,642	39,544	19.1	5.7	13.4	2.03
2013	2,955	55,641	16,258	39,383	18.8	5.5	13.3	2.02
2014	2,982	56,888	16,491	40,397	19.1	5.5	13.6	2.08
2015	3,003	54,867	16,188	38,679	18.3	5.4	12.9	2.02
2016	3,029	52,867	15,719	37,148	17.4	5.2	12.2	1.98
2017	3,041	50,174	15,473	34,701	16.4	5.1	11.3	1.91
2018	3,077	48,120	14,871	33,249	15.6	4.8	10.8	1.86
2019	3,110	45,977	14,941	31,036	14.8	4.8	10.0	1.78
2020	3,138	47,051	19,750	27,301	15.1	6.3	8.8	1.87
2021	3,182	44,330	19,766	24,564	14.1	6.3	7.8	1.76
2022	3,186	42,515	16,344	26,171	13.4	5.2	8.2	1.73
2023		42,075	14,605	27,470	13.1	4.5	8.6	1.75
2024		43,322	15,324	27,998	13.3	4.7	8.6	1.82

=== Ethnic groups ===
The people of Dagestan include a large variety of ethnicities. According to the 2021 Census, Northeast Caucasians (including Avars, Dargins, Lezgins, Laks, Tabasarans, Rutulians and Chechens) make up almost 75% of the population of Dagestan. Turkic peoples, Kumyks, Azerbaijanis, and Nogais make up 21%, and Russians 3.3%. Other ethnicities (e.g. Tats, who are an Iranian people) each account for less than 0.4% of the total population.

Such groups as the Botlikh, the Andi, the Akhvakhs, the Tsez and about ten other groups were reclassified as Avars between the 1926 and 1939 censuses.

Ethnic groups in Dagestan (2021)
1. Avars (30.5%)
2. Dargins (16.6%)
3. Kumyks (15.8%)
4. Lezgins (13.3%)
5. Laks (5.20%)
6. Tabasarans (4.00%)
7. Azerbaijanis (3.70%)
8. Russians (3.30%)
9. Chechens (3.20%)
10. Rutulians (1.00%)
11. Others (3.40%)

Ethnic group	1926 Census		1939 Census		1959 Census		1970 Census		1979 Census		1989 Census		2002 Census		2010 Census		2021 Census^{1}	
Ethnic group	Number	%	Number	%	Number	%	Number	%	Number	%	Number	%	Number	%	Number	%	Number	%
Avars	177,189	22.5%	230,488	24.8%	239,373	22.5%	349,304	24.5%	418,634	25.7%	496,077	27.5%	758,438	29.4%	850,011	29.4%	956,831	30.5%
Dargins	125,707	16.0%	150,421	16.2%	148,194	13.9%	207,776	14.5%	246,854	15.2%	280,431	15.6%	425,526	16.5%	490,384	17.0%	521,381	16.6%
Kumyks	87,960	11.2%	100,053	10.8%	120,859	11.4%	169,019	11.8%	202,297	12.4%	231,805	12.9%	365,804	14.2%	431,736	14.9%	496,455	15.8%
Lezgins	90,509	11.5%	96,723	10.4%	108,615	10.2%	162,721	11.4%	188,804	11.6%	204,370	11.3%	336,698	13.1%	385,240	13.3%	416,963	13.3%
Laks	39,878	5.1%	51,671	5.6%	53,451	5.0%	72,240	5.1%	83,457	5.1%	91,682	5.1%	139,732	5.4%	161,276	5.6%	162,518	5.2%
Tabasarans	31,915	4.0%	33,432	3.6%	33,548	3.2%	53,253	3.7%	71,722	4.4%	78,196	4.6%	110,152	4.3%	118,848	4.1%	126,319	4.0%
Azerbaijanis	23,428	3.0%	31,141	3.3%	38,224	3.6%	54,403	3.8%	64,514	4.0%	75,463	4.2%	111,656	4.3%	130,919	4.5%	116,907	3.7%
Russians	98,197	12.5%	132,952	14.3%	213,754	20.1%	209,570	14.7%	189,474	11.6%	165,940	9.2%	120,875	4.7%	104,020	3.6%	102,243	3.3%
Chechens	21,851	2.8%	26,419	2.8%	12,798	1.2%	39,965	2.8%	49,227	3.0%	57,877	3.2%	87,867	3.4%	93,658	3.2%	99,320	3.2%
Nogais	26,086	3.3%	4,677	0.5%	14,939	1.4%	21,750	1.5%	24,977	1.5%	28,294	1.6%	38,168	1.5%	40,407	1.4%	36,944	1.2%
Aghuls	7,653	1.0%	20,408	2.2%	6,378	0.6%	8,644	0.6%	11,459	0.7%	13,791	0.8%	23,314	0.9%	28,054	1.0%	29,253	0.9%
Rutulians	10,333	1.3%	20,408	2.2%	6,566	0.6%	11,799	0.8%	14,288	0.9%	14,955	0.8%	24,298	1.0%	27,849	1.0%	27,043	0.9%
Tsakhurs	3,531	0.4%	20,408	2.2%	4,278	0.4%	4,309	0.3%	4,560	0.3%	5,194	0.3%	8,168	0.3%	9,771	0.3%	10,320	0.3%
Others	43,861	5.6%	52,031	5.6%	61,495	5.8%	63,787	4.5%	57,892	3.6%	58,113	3.2%	25,835	1.0%	19,646	0.7%	31,752	1.0%
^{1} 47,805 people were registered from administrative databases, and could not declare an ethnicity. It is estimated that the proportion of ethnicities in this group is the same as that of the declared group.

=== Languages ===
Main language areas

More than 30 local languages are commonly spoken, most belonging to the Nakh-Daghestanian language family. Russian became the principal lingua franca in Dagestan during the 20th century; Over 20 of Russia's 131 endangered languages as identified by UNESCO can be found in Dagestan. Most of these endangered languages have speakers in the mountainous region on the Dagestan-Georgia border.

Prior to Soviet rule, the literary lingua-franca status to some extent belonged to Classical Arabic. The northern Avar dialect of Khunzakh has also served as a lingua franca in mountainous Dagestan where Avar-related peoples lived. And throughout centuries the Kumyk language had been the lingua-franca for the bigger part of the Northern Caucasus, from Dagestan to Kabarda, until the 1930s. Kumyk also had been an official language for communication of the Russian Imperial administration with the local peoples.

The first Russian grammar written about a language from present-day Dagestan was for Kumyk. Author Timofey Makarov wrote:

From the peoples speaking Tatar language I liked the most Kumyks, as for their language's distinction and precision, so for their closeness to the European civilization, but most importantly, I take in account that they live on the Left Flank of the Caucasian Front, where we're conducting military actions, and where all the peoples, apart from their own language, speak also Kumyk.

=== Religion ===
Religion in Dagestan (2012)
1. Islam (83.0%)
2. Russian Orthodox Church (2.40%)
3. Nondenominational Christianity (1.00%)
4. Folk religion (2.00%)
5. Spiritual but not religious (9.00%)
6. Atheist (2.00%)
7. Others (0.60%)

According to a 2012 survey which interviewed 56,900 people, 83% of the population of Dagestan adheres to Islam, 2.4% to the Russian Orthodox Church, 2% to Caucasian folk religion and other native faiths, 1% are non-denominational Christians. In addition, 9% of the population identify as "spiritual but not religious", 2% as atheist, and 0.6% as other and no answer.

==== Islam ====
Dagestanis adherents of Islam are largely Sunni Muslims of the Shafii school. On the Caspian coast, particularly in and around the port city of Derbent, the population (primarily made up of Azerbaijanis and Tats) is Shia. A Salafi minority is also present, which is sometimes a target of official repression.

The appearance of Sufi mysticism in Dagestan dates back to the 14th century. The two Sufi orders that are widely spread in the North Caucasus were the Naqshbandiya and the Qadiriya. The mystic tariqas preached tolerance and coexistence between the diverse people in the region. The Communist total intolerance for any religion after the Communist Revolution of 1917 also suppressed the Sufi movements. Shaykh Said Afandi al-Chirkawi was a prominent scholar, spiritual leader, and murshid (guide) of Naqshbandi and Shadhili tariqahs in Dagestan until his death.

Since the dissolution of the Soviet Union, there has been an Islamic revival in the region. By 1996, Dagestan had 1,670 registered mosques, nine Islamic universities, 25 madrassas, 670 maktab, and it is estimated that "nearly one in five Dagestanis was involved in Islamic education", while of the 20,000 or so Russian pilgrims for the Hajj more than half were from Dagestan.

==== Judaism ====
A relatively large number of native Tati-speaking Jews – the "Mountain Jews" – were also present in these same coastal areas. However, since 1991 and the collapse of the Soviet Union, many have migrated to Israel and the United States. These were an extension of much larger Azerbaijani Jewish community across the border in the Azerbaijani districts of Quba and Shamakhi.

==== Christianity ====
The number of Christians among the non-Slavic indigenous population is very low, with estimates between 2,000 and 2,500. Most of these are Pentecostal Christians from the Lak ethnicity. The largest congregation is Osanna Evangelical Christian Church (Pentecostal) in Makhachkala, with more than 1,000 members.

- Cathedral of the Assumption is an Eastern Orthodox cathedral located in the city of Makhachkala, the main cathedral of the Diocese of Makhachkala.
- Church of the Holy Equal-to-the-Apostles Prince Vladimir is a Russian Orthodox cathedral of the Diocese of Makhachkala, located in the city of Makhachkala.

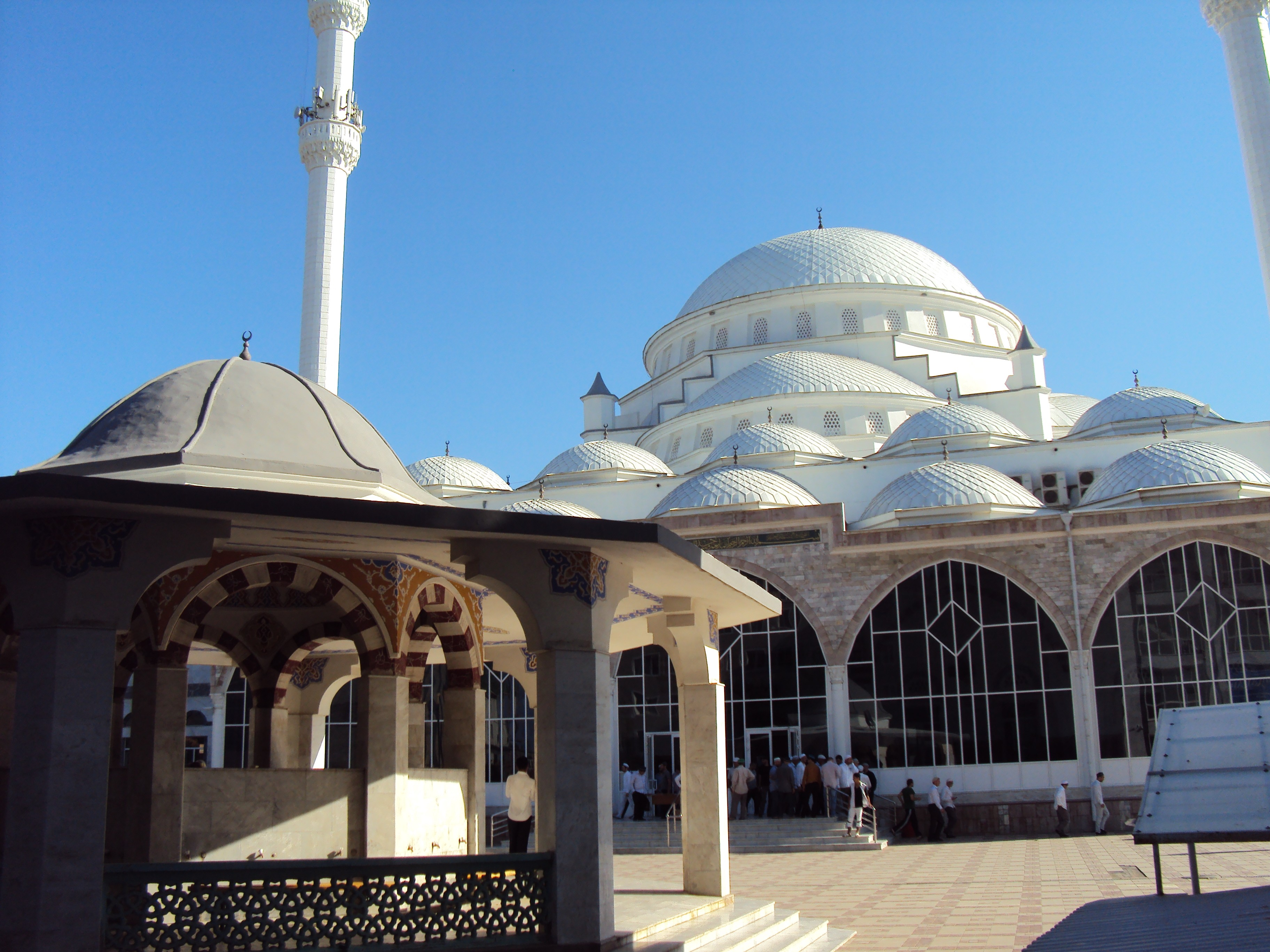
Makhachkala Grand Mosque

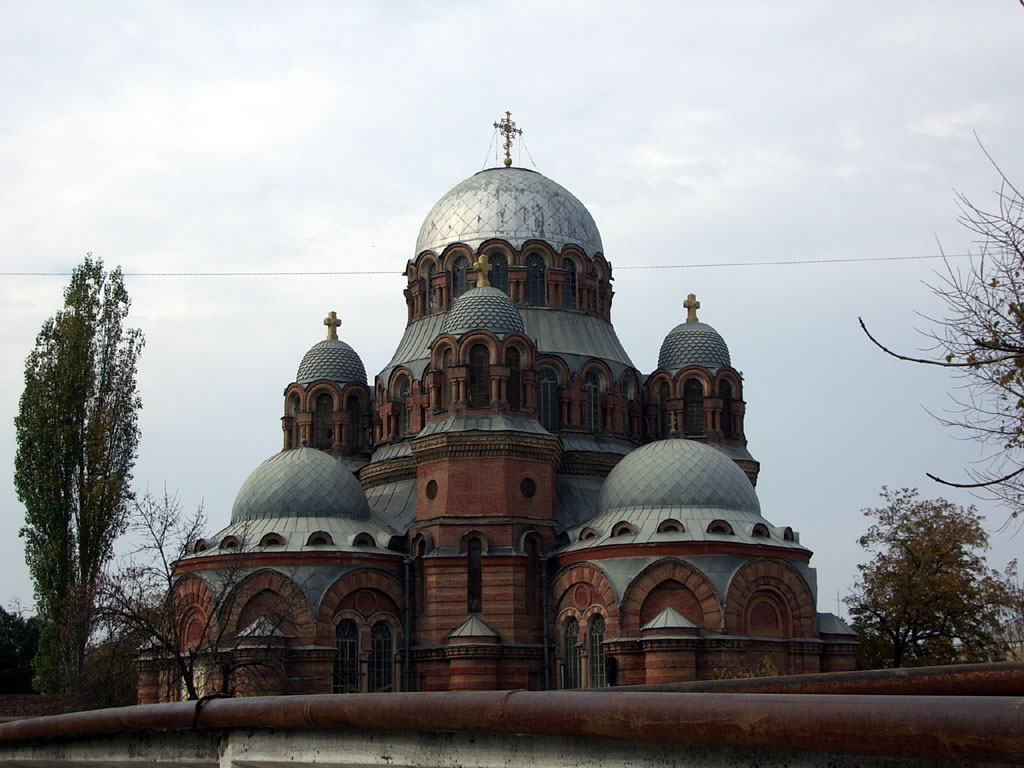
Cathedral of Our Lady of the Sign in Khasavyurt

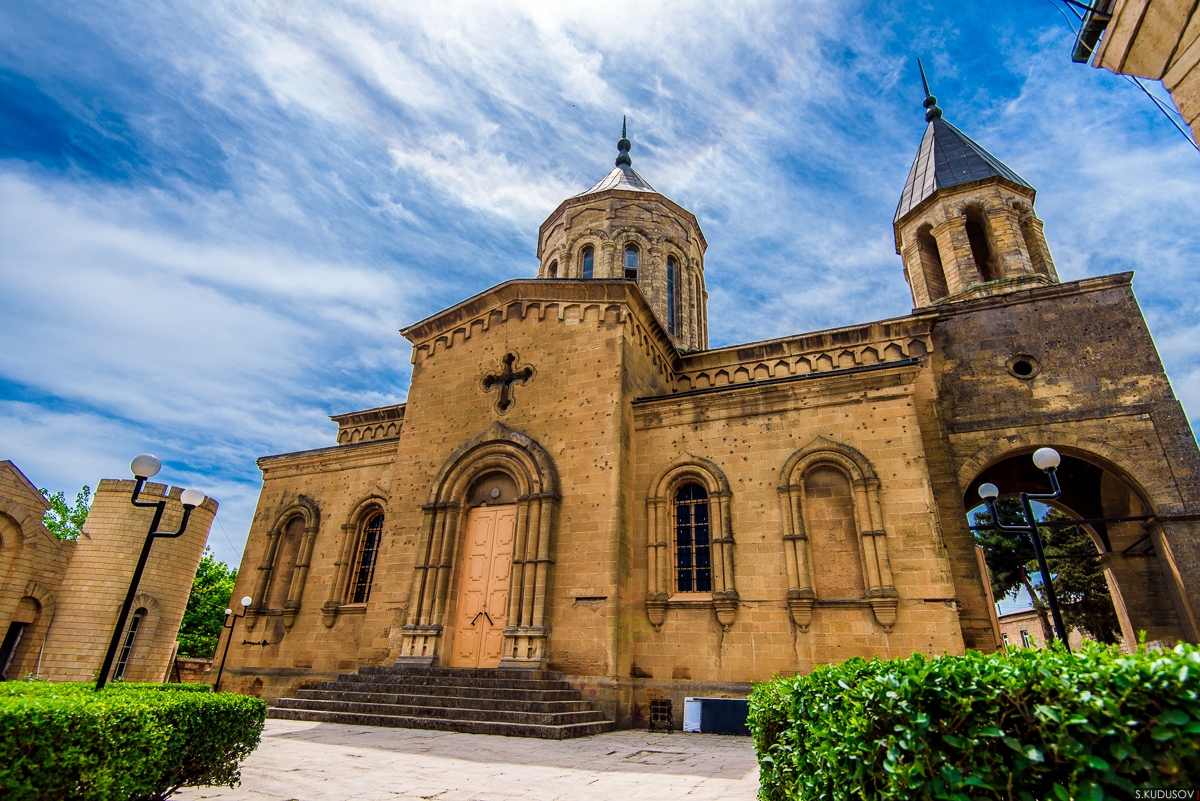
Church of the Holy All-Savior of Derbent

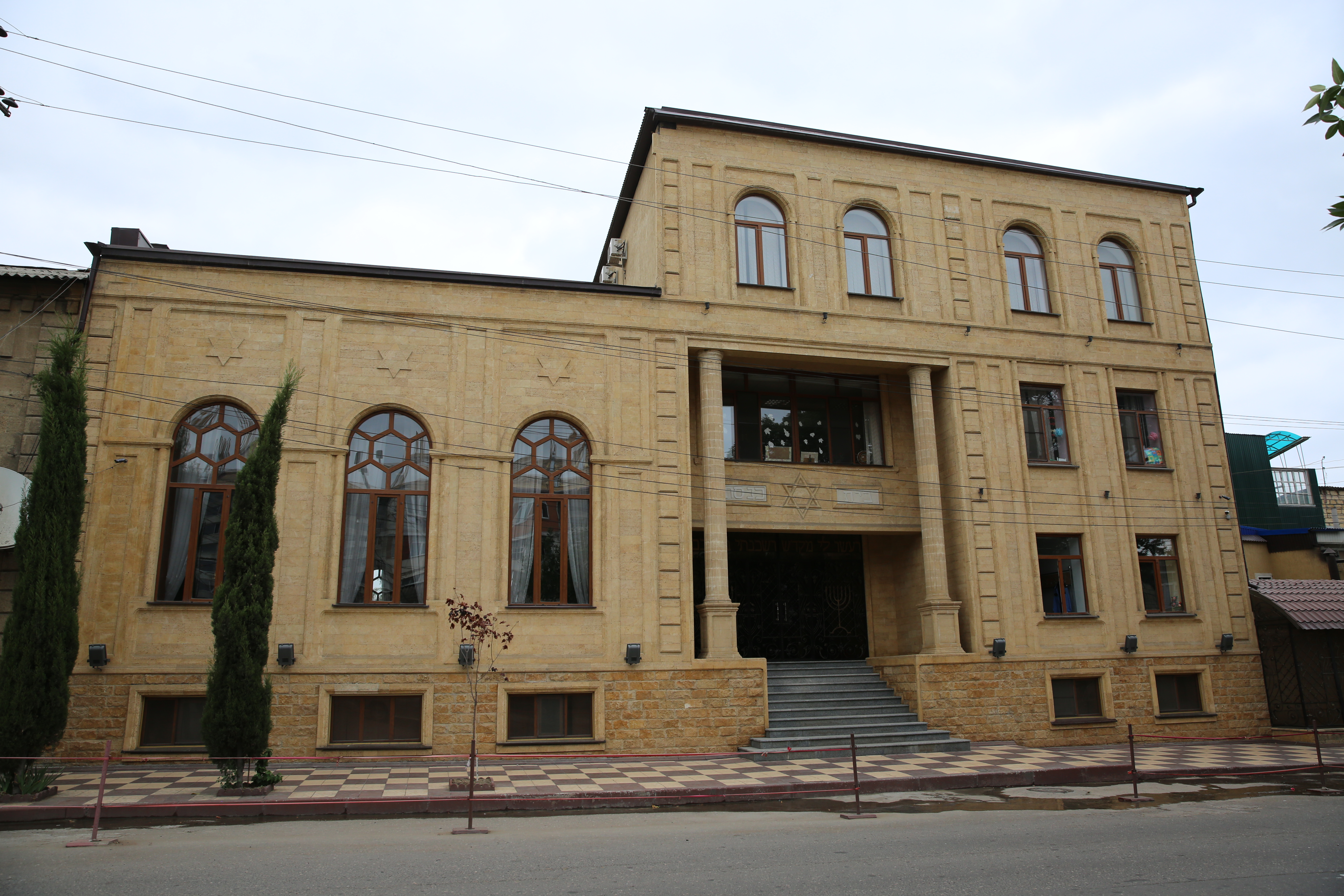
Derbent Synagogue

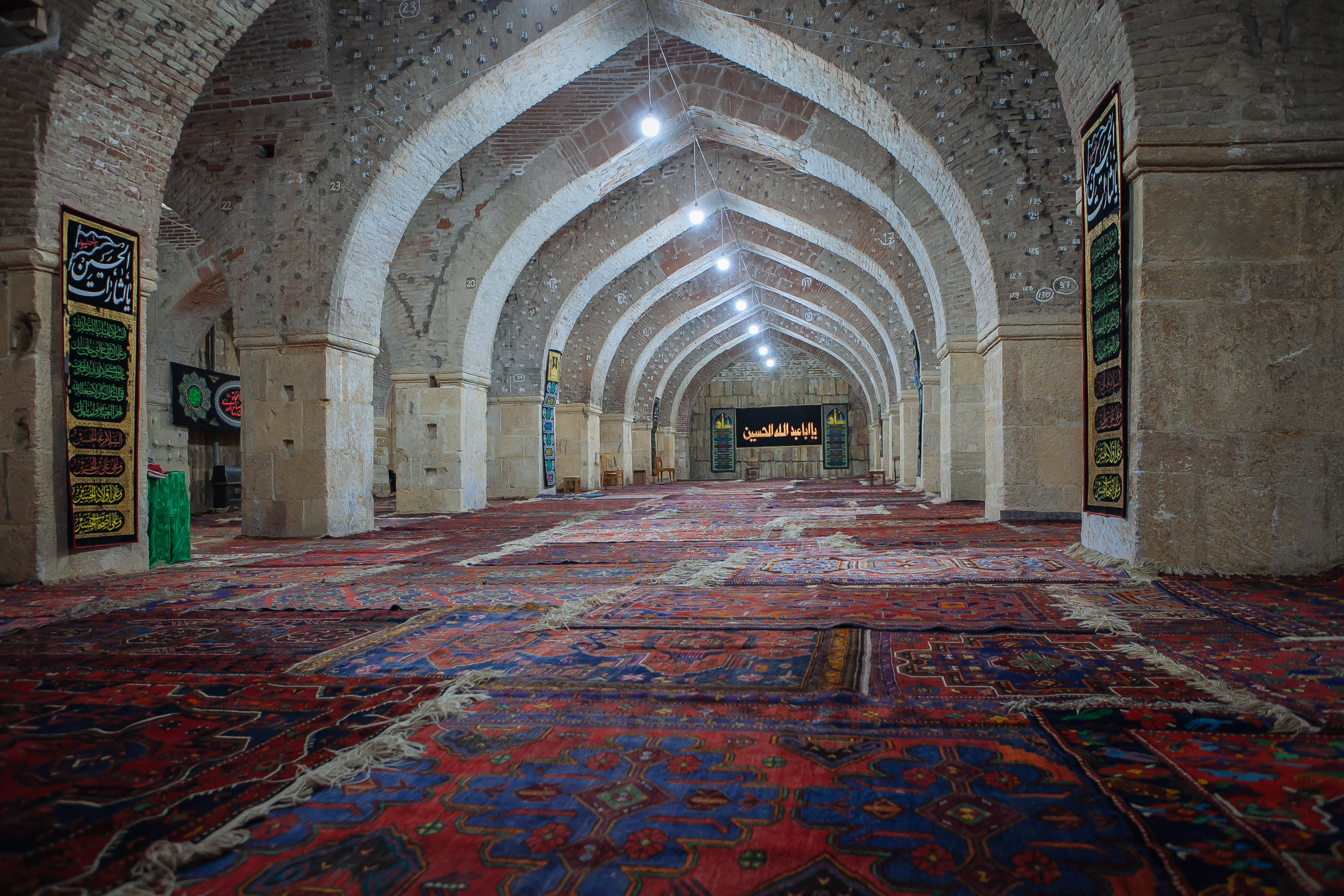
The Juma Mosque of Derbent (built in 733) is the oldest in Russia and one of the oldest in the world.

=== Genetics ===
In 2006, a genetic study of the Dagestan populations, published in Human Biology, suggested that inhabitants of Dagestan are closely related to Anatolian Turks and Cypriot Turks. Yunusbayev et al. pointed out that these findings support the theory that indigenous groups of Dagestan can trace their roots back to ancient Anatolian farming tribes who introduced early agricultural traditions.

=== Notable people ===
- List of Notable people from Dagestan

== Economy ==
The major industries in Dagestan include oil production, engineering, chemicals, machine building, textile manufacturing, food processing and timber. Oil deposits are located in the narrow coastal region. Dagestan's natural gas production goes mostly to satisfy local needs. Agriculture is varied and includes grain-farming, viticulture and wine-making, sheep-farming, and dairying. The engineering and metalworking industries own 20% of the republic's industrial production assets and employ 25% of all industrial workers. Dagestan's hydroelectric power industry is developing rapidly. There are five power plants on the Sulak River providing hydroelectric power. It has been estimated that Dagestan's total potential hydroelectric power resources are 4.4 billion kW. Dagestan has a well-developed transportation system. Railways connect the capital Makhachkala to Moscow, Astrakhan, and the Azerbaijani capital, Baku. The Moscow-Baku highway also passes through Dagestan, and there are air links with major cities.

Conditions for economic development are favorable in Dagestan, but – as of 2006 – the republic's low starting level for a successful transition to market relations, in addition to rampant corruption, has made the region highly dependent on its underground economy and the subsidies coming from the central Russian government. Corruption in Dagestan is more severe than in other regions of the former Soviet Union and is coupled with a flourishing black market and clan-based economic system.

In 2011 Rostelecom started the implementation of WDM-based equipment on the backbone network for data transmission in the Republic of Dagestan. Due to WDM introduction, the fiber-optic communication lines bandwidth increased to 2.5 Gbit/s. Rostelecom invested about 48 million rubles in the project.

== Culture ==
=== Avar literature ===
Epic-historical songs about the defeat of the armies of Afshar Turk Nadir Shah and various episodes of the nineteenth-century wars are popular among the Avars. Best-known are the ballads "Khochbar" and "Kamalil Bashir". In the second half of the nineteenth century and the beginning of the twentieth, Avar culture and literature grew significantly. Well-known Avar literary figures include the poets Aligaji of Inkho (who died 1875) and Chanka (1866–1909), the lyric poet Makhmud (1873–1919), the satirist Tsadasa Gamzat (1877–1951), and the poet Rasul Gamzatov (1923–2003). Among his poems was Zhuravli, which became a well-known Russian song.

=== Music ===
There is a Dagestani Philharmonic Orchestra and a State Academic Dance Ensemble. Gotfrid Hasanov, who is said to be the first professional composer from Dagestan, wrote Khochbar, the first Dagestani opera, in 1945. Dagestani folk dances include a fast-paced dance called the lezginka. It derives its names from the Lezgin people; nevertheless, Azerbaijanis, Circassians, Abkhazians, Mountain Jews, Caucasian Avars, the Russian Kuban, and Terek Cossacks and many other tribes have their own versions.

=== Theaters ===
- Azerbaijani Drama Theatre
- Judeo-Tat Theatre
- Lezgian Musical and Drama Theatre

=== Cuisine ===
Khingal-bat is Dagestan's national dish of small dumplings boiled in ram's broth. Depending on the cook's ethnicity, the dumplings can be oval or round, filled with meat or cheese, and served with a garlic or sour cream sauce. Dairy products and meat constitute a large part of the diet in the mountainous regions, while in the valley zones, vegetables and grain flour are eaten in addition to fruits, edible gourds, edible herbs, and wild grasses.

=== Martial arts ===
Since the dissolution of the Soviet Union, the region has been recognized for producing some of the world's best athletes in combat sports and produces the most MMA fighters of any region relative to population. Dagestani born Khabib Nurmagomedov was a UFC lightweight champion who retired undefeated. His training partner, Islam Makhachev, who is also Dagestani, is the former lightweight champion and current welterweight champion, and currently the #1 ranked UFC pound-for-pound fighter. Khabib's cousin, Umar Nurmagomedov, is ranked #5 in the UFC's bantamweight division. Umar's younger brother, Usman Nurmagomedov, is the former Bellator lightweight champion and currently fights in the PFL. Magomed Ankalaev, who also hails from Dagestan, is the former UFC light heavyweight champion. Abubakar Nurmagomedov is also a cousin of Khabib's who is Dagestani, he is also a professional MMA fighter with a professional record of 17–4–1.

Dagestan has also historically produced a disproportionate number of Olympic and world champions in freestyle wrestling. Buvaisar Saitiev was a three-time Olympic champion, and Abdulrashid Sadulaev won gold at the 2016 Rio Olympics and 2021 Tokyo Olympics; they are both from Dagestan. Magomed Ramazanov, who also hails from Dagestan and is known for his resemblance to Khabib Nurmagomedov, won gold at the 2024 Paris Olympics.

In boxing, Artur Beterbiev is a one-time World Cup gold medalist, a two-time Olympian, and held the undisputed light-heavyweight championship between October 2024 and February 2025.

As well, many Dagestanis have collected accolades for other nations, Akhmed Tazhudinov represents Bahrain and won gold in the 2024 Paris Olympics, Nassourdine Imavov represents France and is the #2 ranked middleweight contender in the UFC; both were born in Dagestan.

== See also ==
- Former countries in Europe after 1815
- Insurgency in the North Caucasus
- Islamic Djamaat of Dagestan
- List of clashes in the North Caucasus
- Shariat Jamaat

== General and cited references ==
- В. М. Солнцев; et al., eds. (2000). Письменные языки мира: Российская Федерация. Социолингвистическая энциклопедия. [Written Languages of the World: Russian Federation. Sociolinguistic Encyclopedia] (in Russian). Москва: Российская Академия Наук. Институт языкознания. проект №99-04-16158.
- 10 июля 2003 г. «Конституция Республики Дагестан», в ред. Закона №45 от 7 октября 2008 г. (July 10, 2003 Constitution of the Republic of Dagestan, as amended by the Law #45 of October 7, 2008. ).
