= Church of Saint Michael the Archangel =

- Храм Михаила Архангела в Грозном (Russian)
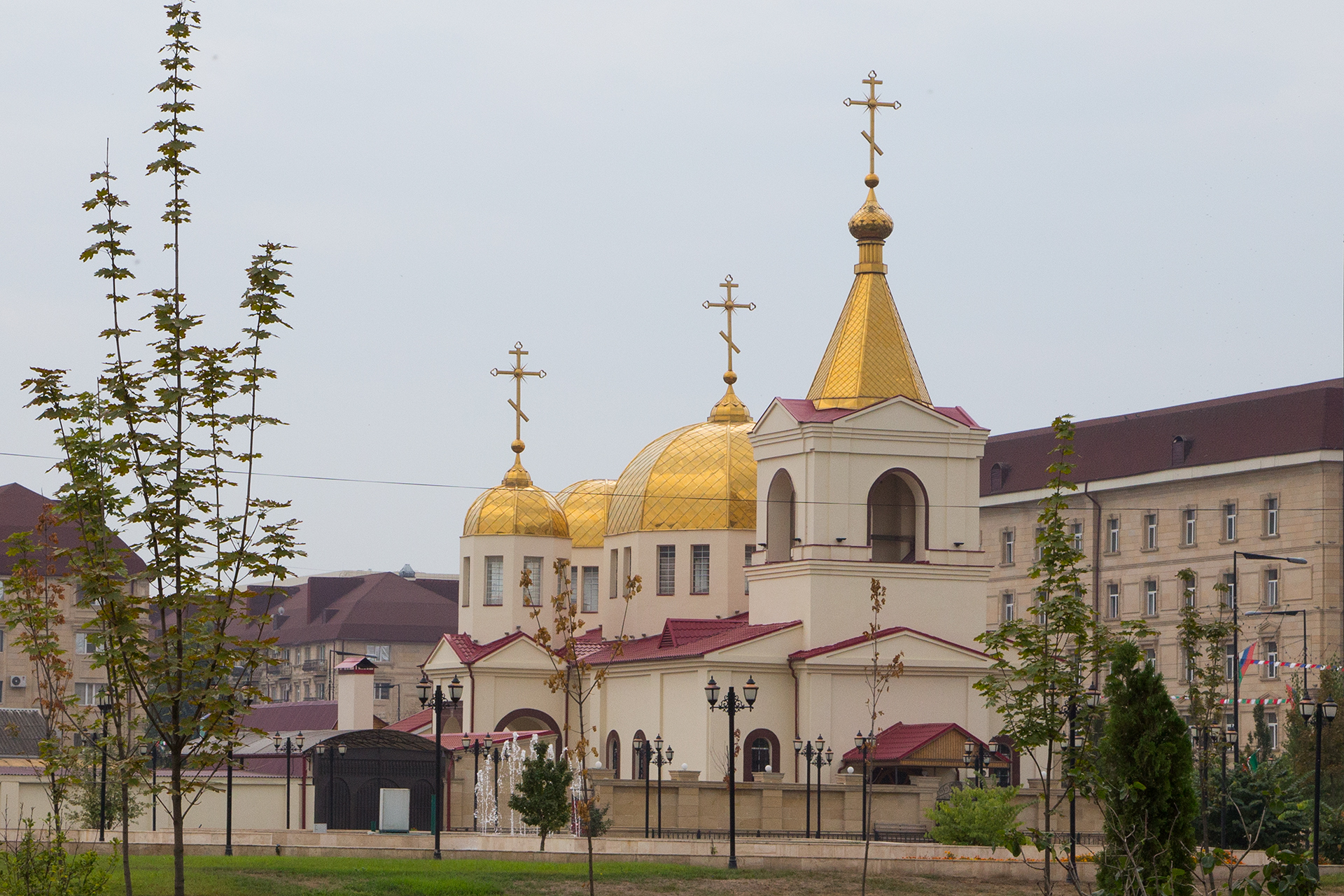
- Church of Saint Michael the Archangel
- 43°18′43″N 45°41′58″E
- Location: Grozny, Chechnya
- Country: Russia
- Denomination: Eastern Orthodoxy

History
- Status: Active
- Consecrated: 1892

Architecture
- Style: Architecture of Russia
- Groundbreaking: 1868
- Completed: 1890

Administration
- Diocese: Makhachkala

The Church of Saint Michael the Archangel (Russian: Храм Михаила Архангела в Грозном) is an Eastern Orthodoxy temple in the city of Grozny, in Chechnya, Russia.

The temple complex is an architectural monument under state protection according to the Resolution of the Council of Ministers of the Checheno-Ingush ASSR No. 413, dated November 25, 1988. In a photo from the 1980s, the temple and the church house are shown lined with red brick and white trim, as they appeared when placed under state protection. Before the first Chechen war, it was one of two active Orthodox churches in the Checheno-Ingush ASSR.

== History ==
External image
- During the war (~1995 year)

In 1868, Armenian and Russian merchants donated funds to begin the construction of the temple. The construction itself was carried out by Terek Cossacks. According to available diocesan information, it was built in 1890 and consecrated in 1892. It was erected from natural stone using public donations.

The complex was seriously damaged during the first Chechen war. During the battle of Grozny in January 1995, the roof of the bell tower, the dome of the liturgical part, the dome of the altar part, and the dome of the side extension were destroyed, and the second floor of the church house was damaged.

During the second Chechen war, the temple complex suffered further damage. Services continued in the basement of the church house.

Since 2004, the temple buildings have been partially restored by units of the Russian Ministry of Defense. Later, funds were allocated from the Rosstroy fund of Russia under a federal program for the temple’s construction.

The temple was consecrated on April 26, 2009, by Archbishop Feofan (Ashurkov).

On May 19, 2018, during an all-night vigil, an armed attack on the temple resulted in the death of one parishioner and injuries to two police officers guarding the service.

== Architecture ==
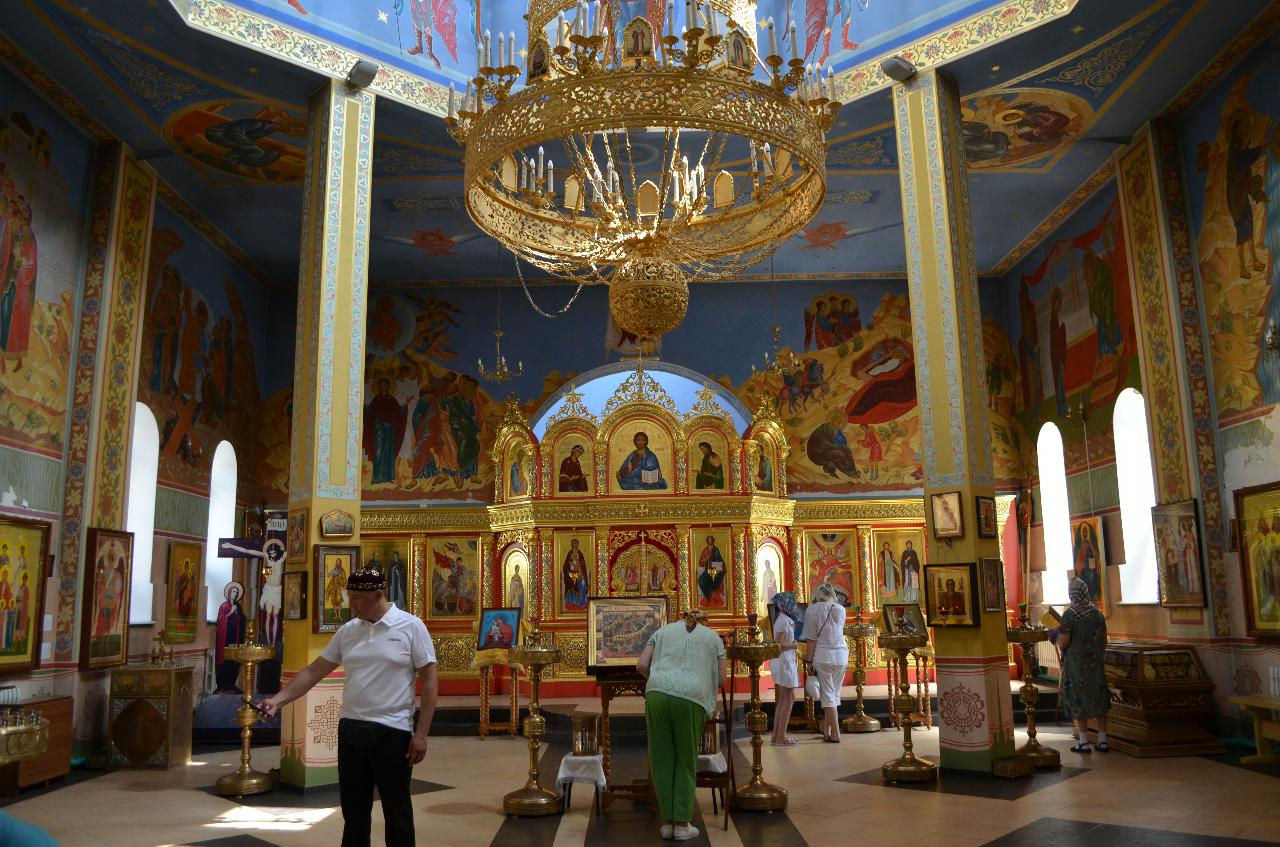
Interior of the temple

Historically, the complex consisted of:

- a three-domed temple in the Russian style with an attached bell tower, a fence with a gate.
- a stone two-story church (parish) house with a basement.
- a church parish school.
- a boiler room, auxiliary premises.

After restoration work, the temple building is a newly constructed structure that has generally retained the size and basic architecture of the historical original. However, the original color (red brick with white trim) has not been preserved. The shape of the windows of the central dome, the shape and number of windows in the altar dome, the characteristic window trim, the shape of the dome of the side extension, and decorative elements (such as the bell tower lattice) have not been restored. In 2006, the walls of the temple were painted white and blue, the domes and roof were bright blue (traditional colors of the Terek Cossacks Army), and the crosses were gilded. The church house is painted white, with a bright blue roof. The original color of the house (red brick with white trim) has not been preserved.

In 2008-2009, during the reconstruction of the central part of Grozny, the domes of the temple were covered with gold leaf, the roof was made of cherry-colored metal tiles, and the white and blue walls were painted white with dark red marble tiles for the trim. The funds for these works were allocated by the Akhmad Kadyrov Charitable Foundation.

== Abbots ==
- 1935-1941, 1942-1945 — Joseph (Orekhov)
- 1992-1995 — Pyotr Netsvetaev
- 1995-1996 — Anatoly Chistousov, kidnapped by Chechen militants and killed in captivity
- 1996-1997 — Evfimy (Belomestny), kidnapped by Chechen militants, released
- 1999 — Zakharia (Yampolsky), kidnapped by Chechen militants, fate unknown
- 2004-2011, from January 27, 2013 — Archbishop Varlaam (Ponomarev)
- From June 22, 2011, to October 2016 — Grigory (Kutsenko)
- From October 24, 2016, to August 2018 — Sergiy (Abazov)
