= Cathedral of Our Lady of the Sign (Khasavyurt) =

- Собор во имя иконы Знамение Пресвятой Богородицы (Russian)
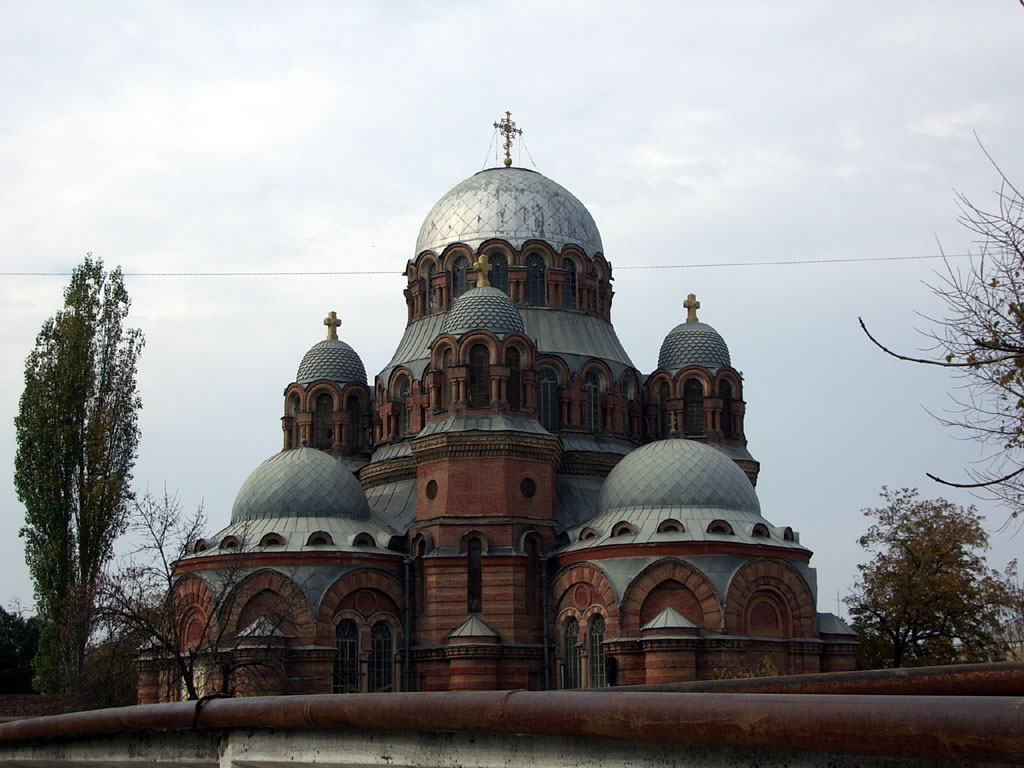
- Cathedral of Our Lady of the Sign in Khasavyurt
- Cathedral of Our Lady of the Sign
- 43°14′42″N 46°34′52″E
- Location: Khasavyurt, Dagestan
- Country: Russia
- Denomination: Eastern Orthodoxy

History
- Status: Active
- Consecrated: April 15, 1907

Architecture
- Architect: Ivan Ryabikin
- Style: Neo-Byzantine architecture in the Russian Empire
- Groundbreaking: 1903
- Completed: 1907

Administration
- Diocese: Diocese of Makhachkala

The Cathedral of Our Lady of the Sign (Russian: Собор во имя иконы Знамение Пресвятой Богородицы) is the largest Orthodox church in the North Caucasus, an architectural monument of the early 20th century. A bright representative of the neo-Byzantine style in architecture. Located in the city of Khasavyurt, Republic of Dagestan, Russia.

The parish belongs to the Makhachkala deanery of the Diocese of Makhachkala of the Russian Orthodox Church. The cathedral is in the center of Khasavyurt on Toturbieva Street, 121. It is the architectural dominant of the city; the domes and crosses of the cathedral are far visible from the outskirts of the city.

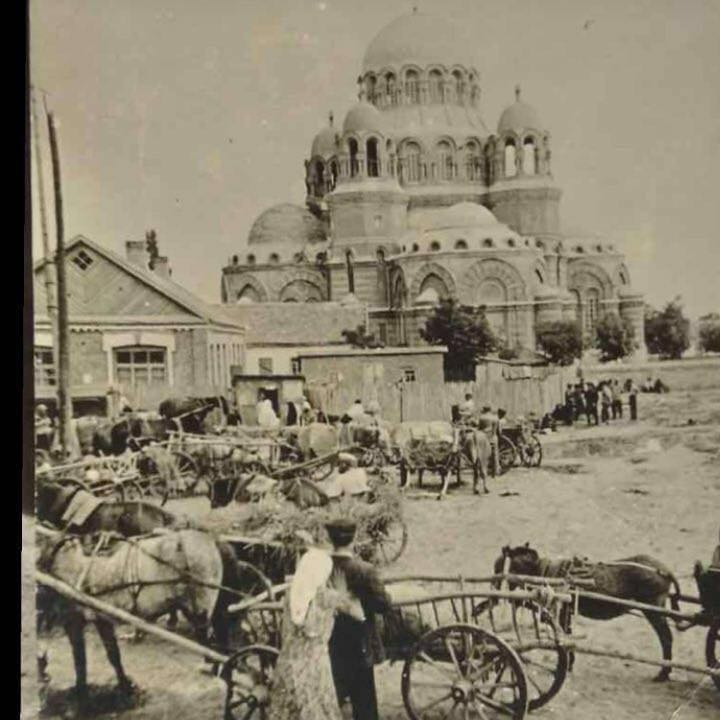
Khasavyurt, market square.

== History ==
The design of the cathedral was drawn up by civil engineer Ivan Vasilievich Ryabikin (1845-1942) in 1901. However, the project required increasing the volume of the cathedral, since over the previous two years Khasavyurt had been significantly replenished by peasants from the district. In March 1902, the second version of the project was completed, according to which the cathedral could accommodate up to 1000 people, and already on May 30, the foundation stone for the temple on Slobodsky Boulevard was made.

The cathedral was built in 1903–1904 by the Cossacks of the Terek Cossacks Army for the 300th anniversary of the Romanov dynasty.

In the early years, the cathedral had rich interior decoration, paintings, and stucco. Like many religious buildings in the country, the cathedral has a tragic fate: in 1939, the authorities closed the cathedral, the building was converted into a fuel and lubricants warehouse. In 1943, there was a fire, which destroyed the entire interior and paintings.

In 1943, the cathedral was returned to believers and services were resumed there. However, during Soviet times, the architectural ensemble of the cathedral was destroyed, and the entire cathedral area was built up.

In the 1990s, due to the outflow of the Russian-speaking population from the city and region, the number of parishioners decreased significantly.

In 2015, the cathedral was included in the federal program “Culture of Russia”, which may allow for repair and restoration work to be carried out in it.
