= Cathedral of the Assumption of Makhachkala =

Cathedral of the Assumption
- Успенский кафедральный собор (Russian)
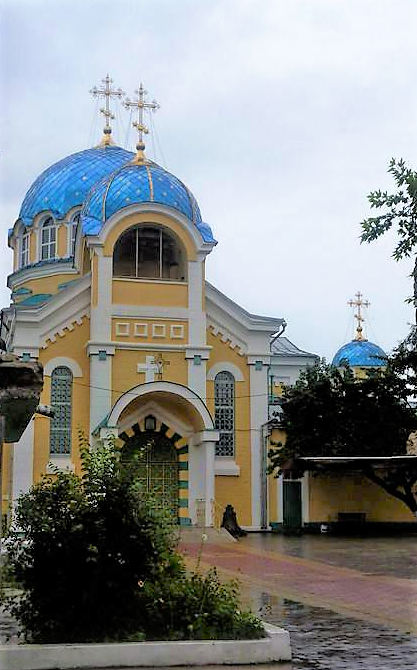
- Cathedral of the Assumption in Makhachkala
- Cathedral of the Assumption
- 42°59′59.31″N 47°27′48.07″E
- Location: Makhachkala, Dagestan
- Country: Russia
- Denomination: Eastern Orthodoxy

History
- Status: Active
- Consecrated: 1906

Architecture
- Style: Russian Revival architecture
- Groundbreaking: 1905
- Completed: 25 February 1906

Administration
- Diocese: Makhachkala

The Cathedral of the Assumption (Russian: Успенский кафедральный собор; prior to 1945 the Church of the Mozdok Icon of the Mother of God) is a Russian Orthodox cathedral located in the city of Makhachkala, the capital of the Russian Republic of Dagestan. It is the seat of the Diocese of Makhachkala.

== History ==
The first church on the site was built in 1890. It was made of wood and was built at the expense of residents of the station settlement of Petrovsk-Kavkazsky (now Makhachkala).

In 1905, Emperor Nicholas II allocated 1,000 rubles for the construction of a stone church. Construction was completed a year later, on 25 February 1906. The church was consecrated in honor of the Mozdok Panagia Portaitissa, the patroness of the Caucasus.

The first rector of the church was Afanasy Alibekov, who took an active part in the construction of the temple. He collected money from the parishioners for the construction, and oversaw the work of the Armenian masons who erected the walls of the church.

After the Russian Revolution (1917-1923), the church was closed. Its premises in different years housed a warehouse and a shop. Religious services were resumed only in 1943. In the same year it was consecrated in honor of the feast of the Assumption of the Blessed Virgin Mary.

In 1969, with the blessing of Patriarch Alexy I, the iconostasis was transferred to the church from the Church of the Holy Archangel Gabriel, in Moscow on Arkhangelsky Lane.

In 1988, the church building was taken under state protection as a monument of local importance.

=== Modern period ===
In connection with the emigration of the Russian-speaking population from Dagestan, there has been a significant decrease in the number of parishioners. On 2 June 2000, the temple received the status of a cathedral. In 2004, to expand the area of the cathedral, a parecclesion was added to it, consecrated in honor of St. Alexander Nevsky.

In 2005, by decision of the head of the administration of Makhachkala, the restoration of the cathedral began. The vault and walls of the cathedral were repainted, the iconostasis was restored.

In 2012 it became the seat of the Diocese of Makhachkala.

== Relics ==
On 13 January 2014, the Agiou Pavlou Monastery on Mount Athos presented copies of the Gifts of the Magi to the cathedral.

== See also ==
- The rector of the Holy Assumption Cathedral in Makhachkala was awarded the medal of the Holy Apostle Bartholomew of the first degree
- Alexey Romanov - "With Christ We Are Not Fearing Anything!"
