= Church of the Holy Equal-to-the-Apostles Prince Vladimir of Makhachkala =

Church of the Holy Equal-to-the-Apostles Prince Vladimir
- Храм Святого Равноапостольного Князя Владимира (Russian)
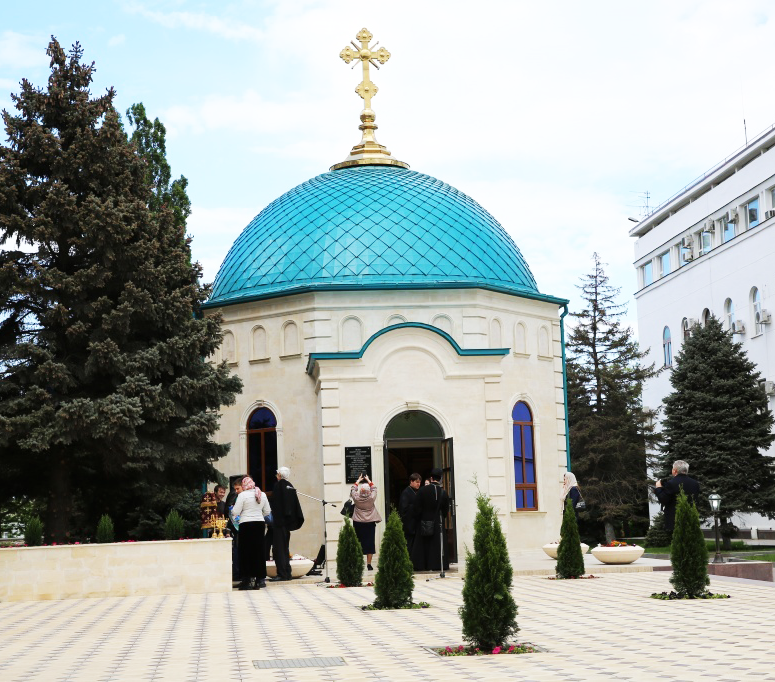
- Church of the Holy Equal-to-the-Apostles Prince Vladimir in Makhachkala
- Church of the Holy Equal-to-the-Apostles Prince Vladimir
- 42°59′03″N 47°30′16″E
- Location: Makhachkala, Dagestan
- Country: Russia
- Denomination: Eastern Orthodoxy

History
- Status: Active
- Consecrated: May 7, 2016

Architecture
- Style: Dagestan architecture
- Groundbreaking: 2015
- Completed: May 2016

Administration
- Diocese: Makhachkala

The Church of the Holy Equal-to-the-Apostles Prince Vladimir is a Russian Orthodox cathedral of the Diocese of Makhachkala, located in the city of Makhachkala, the capital of the Russian Republic of Dagestan.

== History ==
The cathedral was built on the initiative of the Head of the Republic of Dagestan Ramazan Abdulatipov, according to whose idea a temple and a mosque were built on both sides of the Government building.

Construction began in 2015. The cathedral was completed and consecrated in May 2016. Funds for the construction were donated by Abdulatipov himself.

The cathedral was built in the so-called Dagestan style, and it can be distinguished from the mosque located nearby only by the cross.

The cathedral was built on the site where the Cathedral of St. Alexander Nevsky (1891–1952) was before it was demolished in 1952.

== Opening ==
The grand opening took place on May 7, 2016, on Saturday of Bright Week, in a solemn atmosphere with the presence of the Head of the Republic Dagestan, Diocese of Makhachkala, Chairman of the Government of the Republic of Dagestan, Speaker of the Parliament of Dagestan, Mayor of Makhachkala, representatives of the muftiate and the Jewish community of the republic.
