= List of federal subjects of Russia by unemployment rate =

This is a list of federal subjects of Russia with the corresponding Unemployment Rate. All figures are from the Russian Statistical Bureau.

Federal subject	2019	2020	2024
Central Federal District	2.9	3.9	
Belgorod Oblast	3.9	4.9	
Bryansk Oblast	3.8	4	
Vladimir Oblast	4	5.6	
Voronezh Oblast	3.6	4.3	
Ivanovo Oblast	3.8	5.4	
Kaluga Oblast	3.7	4.7	
Kostroma Oblast	4.1	5.5	
Kursk Oblast	4	4.9	
Lipetsk Oblast	3.7	4.3	
Moscow Oblast	2.7	3.6	
Orel Oblast	5.3	6.1	
Ryazan Oblast	3.9	5.4	
Smolensk Oblast	5.2	5.3	
Tambov Oblast	3.9	4.6	
Tver Oblast	4	4.4	
Tula Oblast	3.8	4.4	
Yaroslavl Oblast	5.4	7.3	
Moscow	1.4	2.6	
Northwestern Federal District	3.6	5	
Republic of Karelia	7.4	8.7	
Komi Republic	6.8	7.7	
Arkhangelsk Oblast	6.3	7.4	
Nenets Autonomous Okrug	7.9	8.8	
Vologda Oblast	4.5	6.1	
Kaliningrad Oblast	4.4	5.9	
Leningrad Oblast	3.9	5.3	
Murmansk Oblast	5.4	7.7	
Novgorod Oblast	3.6	5.8	
Pskov Oblast	5.1	6.5	
St.Petersburg	1.4	2.9	
Southern Federal District	5.3	6.1	
Republic of Adygea	8.2	8.5	
Republic of Kalmykia	9.2	9.6	
Republic of Crimea^{[a]}	5.6	6.3	
Krasnodar Krai	4.8	5.7	
Astrakhan Oblast	7.6	7.9	
Volgograd Oblast	5.3	7.6	
Rostov Oblast	4.8	5	
Sevastopol^{[a]}	3.9	4.6	
North Caucasian Federal District	11	13.9	
Republic of Dagestan	13	15.7	
Republic of Ingushetia	26.4	29.8	
Kabardino-Balkar Republic	10.7	14.8	
Karachay–Cherkess Republic	11.7	14.7	
Republic of North Ossetia–Alania	12.1	15.4	
Chechen Republic	13.5	18.5	
Stavropol Krai	4.8	6.2	
Volga Federal District	4.2	5.2	
Republic of Bashkortostan	4.4	5.9	
Mari El Republic	4.6	6.8	
Mordovia	4.2	5.3	
Tatarstan	3.3	3.6	
Udmurtia	4.3	6.3	
Chuvashia	4.7	6.1	
Perm Krai	5.2	5.7	
Kirov Oblast	4.8	5.4	
Nizhny Novgorod Oblast	4.1	4.6	
Orenburg Oblast	4.4	5.9	
Penza Oblast	4.3	5	
Samara Oblast	3.9	4.4	
Saratov Oblast	4.3	5.6	
Ulyanovsk Oblast	3.8	4.9	
Ural Federal District	4.3	5.5	
Kurgan Oblast	7.8	8.2	
Sverdlovsk Oblast	4.2	5.8	
Tyumen Oblast	3	3.6	
Khanty–Mansi Autonomous Okrug	2.5	3	
Yamalo-Nenets Autonomous Okrug	1.9	2.4	
Chelyabinsk Oblast	5.1	6.8	
Siberian Federal District	5.9	7.3	
Altai Republic	11	14	
Tuva Republic	12.3	18	
Khakassia	6	8.7	
Altai Krai	5.8	5.9	
Krasnoyarsk Krai	4.5	6	
Irkutsk Oblast	6.6	7.7	
Kemerovo Oblast	5.5	6.7	
Novosibirsk Oblast	6.1	6.7	
Omsk Oblast	6.4	8.9	
Tomsk Oblast	5.5	8.6	
Far Eastern Federal District	6	6.5	
Republic of Buryatia	9.2	10.5	
Zabaykalsky Krai	9.3	9.8	
Republic of Sakha	6.9	7.4	
Kamchatka Krai	3.8	3.8	
Primorsky Krai	5.2	5.5	
Khabarovsk Krai	3.8	4	
Amur Oblast	5.4	6	
Magadan	4.6	5.6	
Sakhalin	5.2	5.5	
Jewish Autonomous Oblast	6.2	6.3	
Chukotka Autonomous Okrug	3.8	4.4	
Russian Federation	4.6	5.8	
