= Diocese of Makhachkala and Derbent =

Diocese of the Russian Orthodox Church

Diocese of Makhachkala and Derbent Махачкалинская и Дербентская епархия
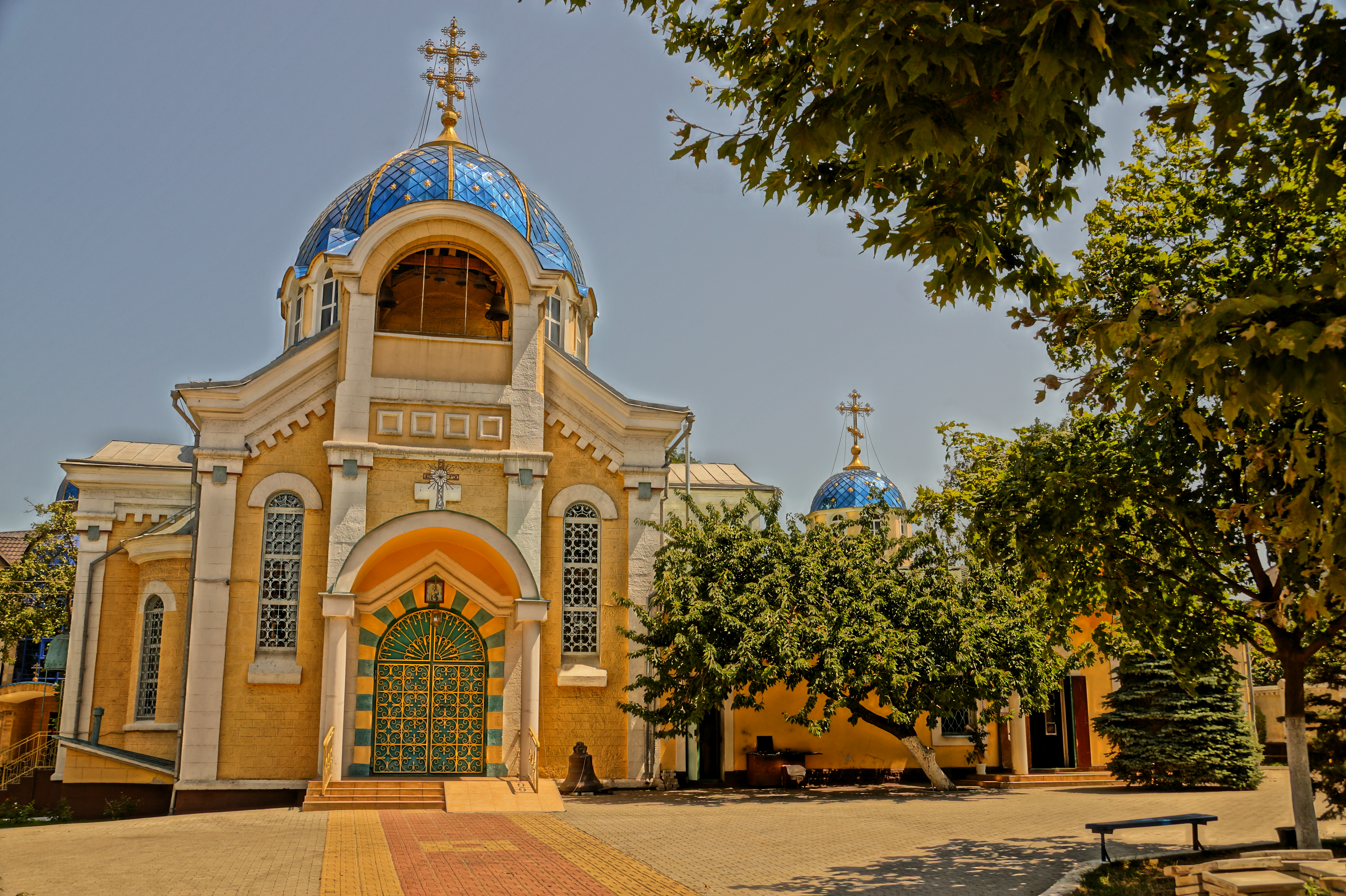
- Cathedral of the Assumption, Makhachkala

Location
- Country: Russia
- Headquarters: Makhachkala

Statistics
- Parishes: 50
- Churches: 29

Information
- Denomination: Russian Orthodoxy
- Established: 26 December 2012
- Cathedral: Cathedral of the Assumption, Makhachkala
- Language: Russian

Current leadership
- Bishop: Barlaam (Ponomaryov)

The Diocese of Makhachkala and Derbent is a diocese of the Russian Orthodox Church on the territory of Dagestan, Ingushetia and Chechnya with its seat in the city of Makhachkala, the capital of the Republic of Dagestan, Russia. The main temple is the Cathedral of the Assumption.

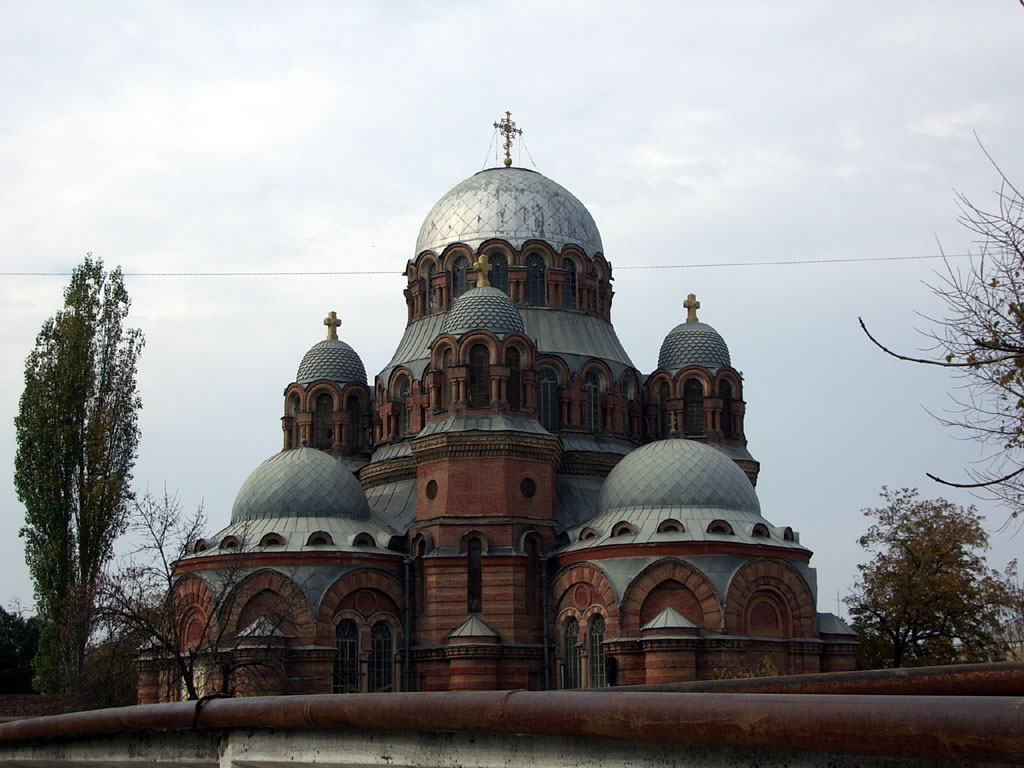
Cathedral of Our Lady of the Sign, Khasavyurt

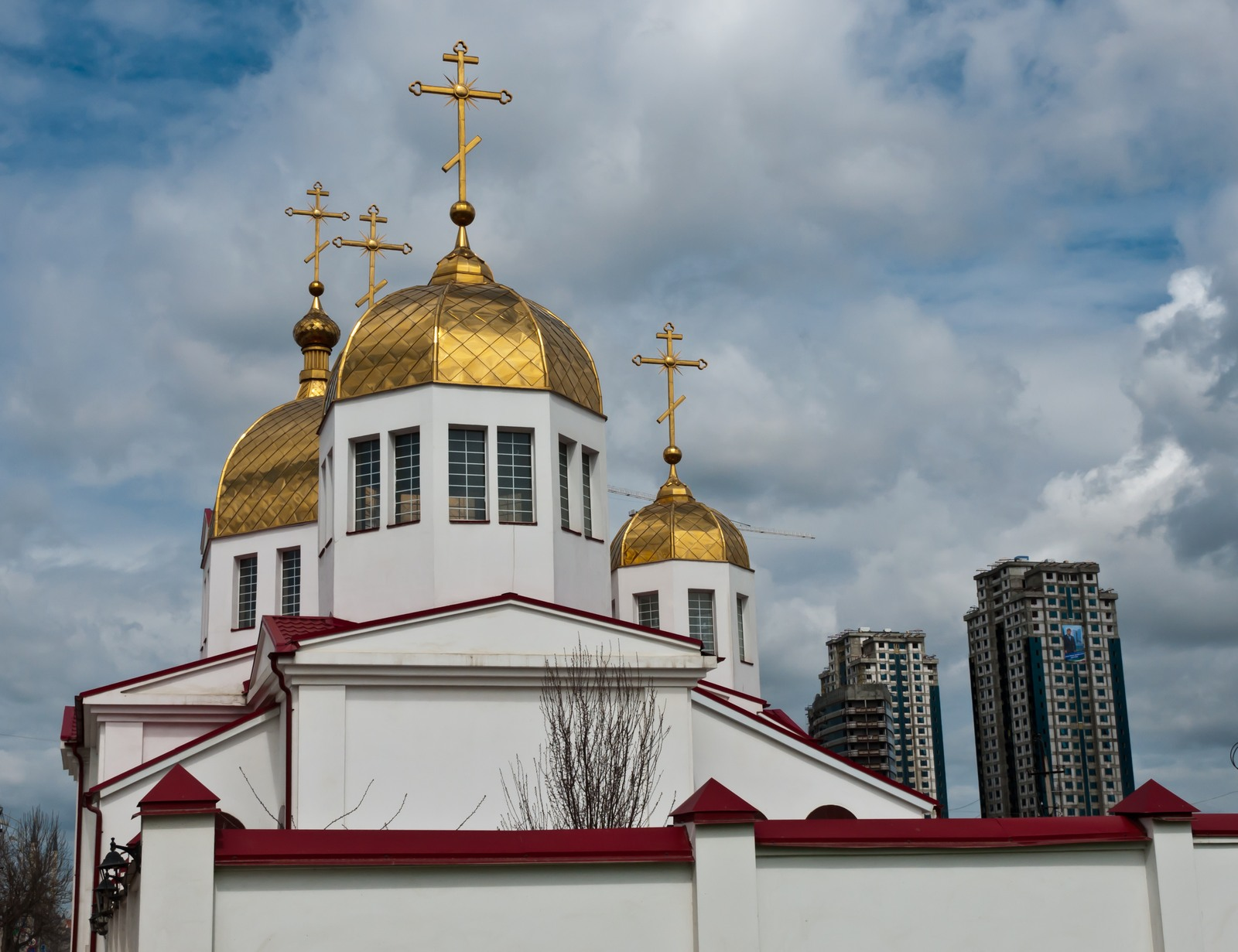
Church of Saint Michael the Archangel in Grozny

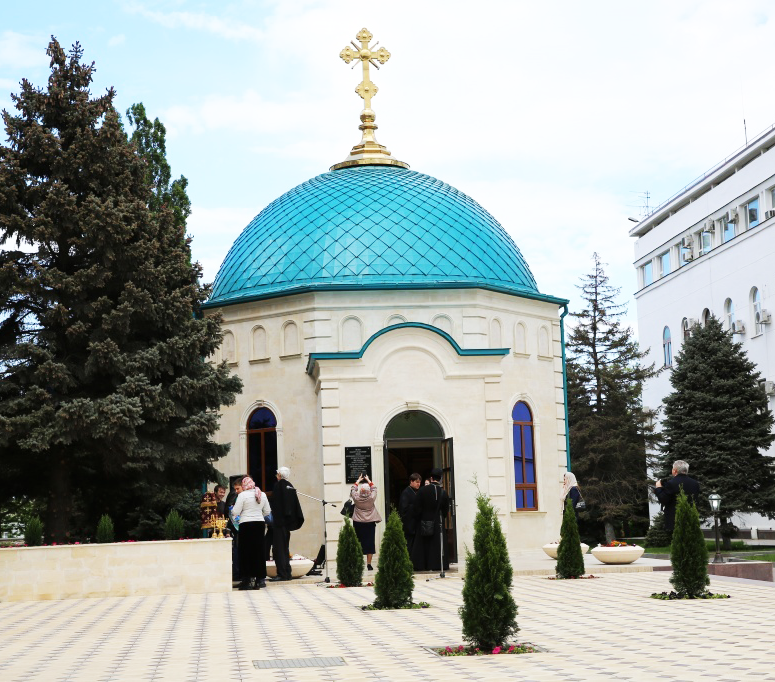
Church of the Holy Equal-to-the-Apostles Prince Vladimir is located on the main square of Makhachkala

== History ==
Historically, the territory of the diocese was part of the Diocese of Astrakhan. In 1842, after the formation of the Diocese of Stavropol, the territory of the current Makhachkala diocese became part of it.

On 28 December 1998, the territory of Dagestan became part of the Diocese of Baku. On 22 March 2011 Dagestan, Ingushetia and Chechnya became part of the Diocese of Vladikavkaz.

On 26 December 2012, the Holy Synod formed the independent Makhachkala diocese, separated from the Vladikavkaz diocese, with its seat in Makhachkala and with the inclusion of parishes and monasteries in Dagestan, Ingushetia and Chechnya.

On 5 October 2015, Bishop Barlaam (Ponomaryov) of Makhachkala and Grozny led a religious procession in the city of Kizlyar, which became the first in Dagestan in recent history. The procession, timed to coincide with the celebration of the 1000th anniversary of the repose of Equal-to-the-Apostles Prince Vladimir and the 280th anniversary of the founding of the city, brought together about 1,000 Orthodox believers who walked a total of about three kilometers.

On March 20, 2025, an independent Diocese of Grozny was established for the territories of Ingushetia and the Chechen Republic, resulting in the ruling bishop’s title being changed to Makhachkala and Derbent.

== Statistics ==
Statistics at the end of 2014:

- Ministries - 24
- Diaconates - 4
- Deanery districts - 4
- Churches - 29
- Chapels - 15
- Prayer rooms - 3
- House churches – 1
- Monastery - 2

== Temples and monasteries ==
The Makhachkala deanery unites churches on the territory of Dagestan, with the exception of the three northern regions. The borders of the deanery coincide with the borders of the Republic of Dagestan, except for the northern one, which runs along the Terek River.

- Church of the Intercession of the Holy Virgin, Derbent
- Church of Saint Michael the Archangel, Grozny
- Cathedral of Our Lady of the Sign, Khasavyurt
- Holy Cross Exaltation Monastery, Kizlyar
- Cathedral of the Assumption, Makhachkala
- Church of the Holy Equal-to-the-Apostles Prince Vladimir, Makhachkala

== See also ==
- The Holy Synod within Dagestan formed the Makhachkala diocese within Dagestan, Ingushetia and the Chechen Republic
