= Gotfrid Hasanov =

Soviet composer (1900–1965)

- Born: Hasanrin Alidin hwa Dzhabrail; 1 May 1900; Derbent, Dagestan Oblast, Russian Empire
- Died: 28 May 1965 (aged 65); Moscow, Soviet Union
- Occupation: Composer

Gotfrid (Dzhabrail) Alievich Gasanov (Lezgian: Гьасанрин Алидин хва Джабраил; 1 May 1900 – 28 May 1965) was a Soviet and Lezgin composer. Honoured Worker of the Arts Industry of the RSFSR (1960), and a laureate of two Stalin Prizes (1949, 1951).
