= History of the Jews in Derbent =

Derbent Jews
יהודים דרבנטים Дербентские евреи
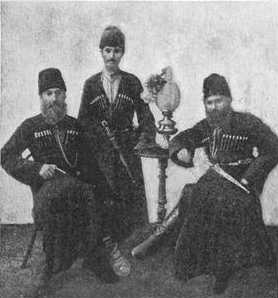

Total population
- 620

Languages
- Hebrew (in Israel), Judeo-Tat, Russian

Religion
- Judaism

Related ethnic groups
- Mountain Jews, Ashkenazi Jews.

The Jewish community in Derbent, in the Russian Republic of Dagestan, is the oldest in the North Caucasus and dates back to the 7th century. A large influx of Jewish immigrants occurred during the Russian Civil War (1917-1923). Most Derbent Jews immigrated from the mountain and steppe villages of the northern Caucasus.

== History ==
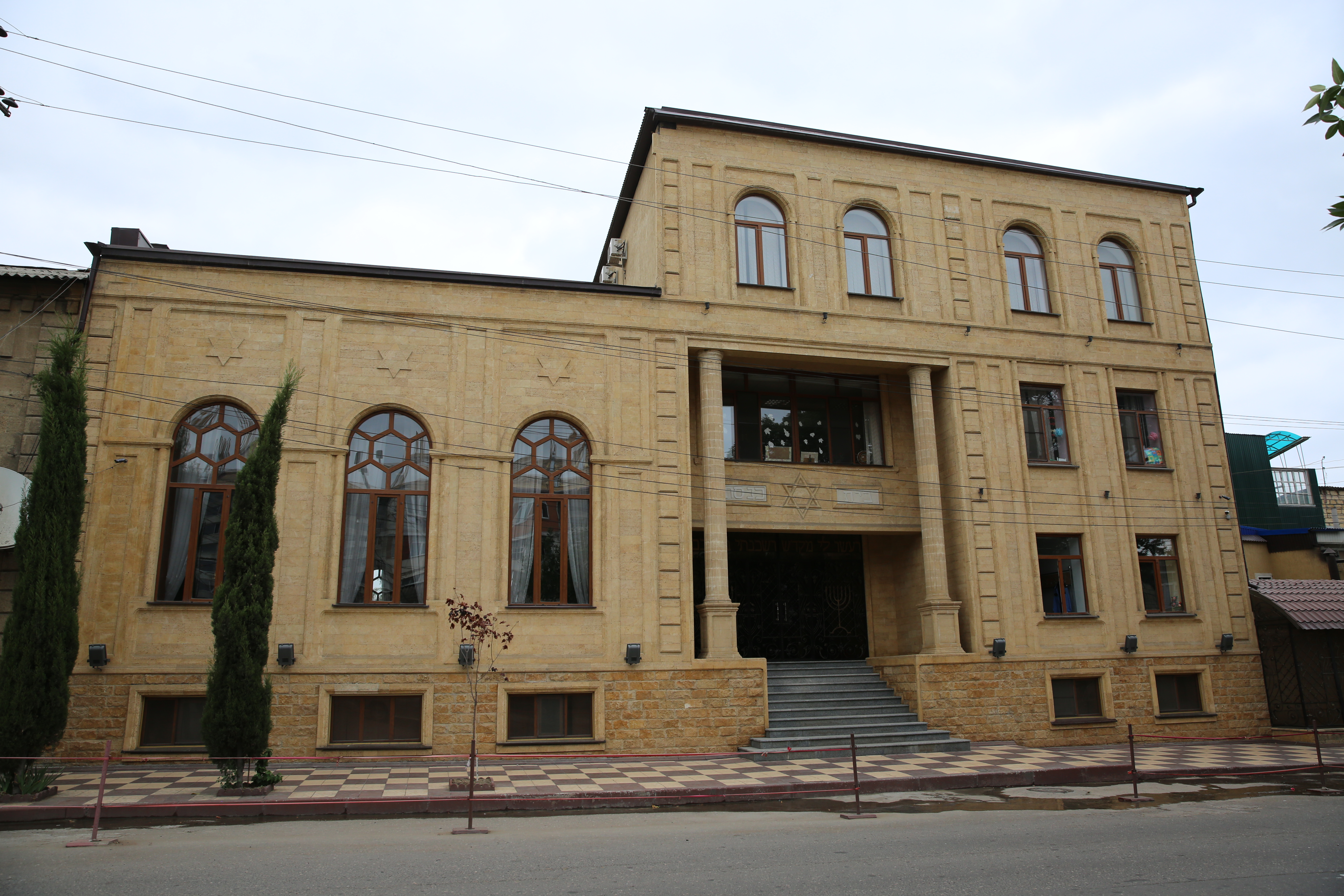
The Derbent Synagogue

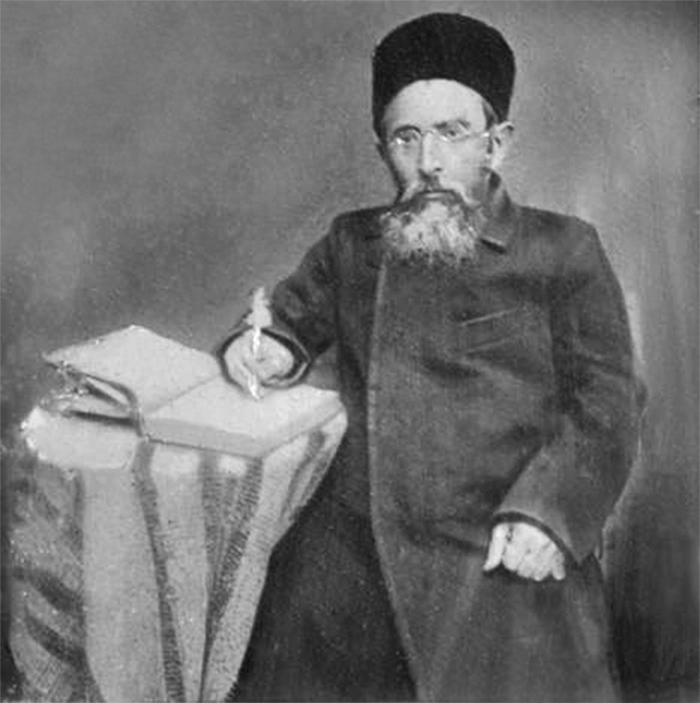
Yaakov Yitzhaki

=== Antiquity and Middle Ages ===
The Jewish population of Derbent and its neighborhood are descended from a military colony established by the Persian emperor Khosrow I in the 6th century.

Under the Khazar Khaganate the Jewish community of Derbent increased. The ancestry of the Mountain Jews also includes later settlers from Iran, Iraq and Byzantium.

Jewish-Khazar correspondence, in particular the Schechter Letter, also mentions Derbent and local Jews in the process of accepting Judaism by the Khazars.

The medieval-era Jewish merchants played a significant role in the activity of the Silk Road.

Derbent was one of the centers of early medieval merchants during and after the Khazar Khaganate.

The Jewish community of Derbent was described by travelers including Benjamin of Tudela in the 12th century and William of Rubruck in the 13th.

=== After joining the Russian Empire ===
In the 18th century, Jews were persecuted during the Russo-Persian Wars, and the Persian ruler Nader Shah forced many Jews to convert to Islam.

After Russia conquered Dagestan, many Jews concentrated in Derbent and the city became the religious center of the Mountain Jews. Rabbis of Derbent, Eliyahu ben Mishael Mizrachi (1781-1848) and Yitzhak ben Yaakov Mizrachi (1795-1877) were known for their scholarship. Rabbi Yaakov Yitzhaki (1848-1917) in the 1870s established contacts with the Jewish scholars of St. Petersburg. In 1907 he emigrated to Eretz-Israel.

The Derbent rabbi Yaakov Yitzhaki led a group of Mountain Jews from the Caucasus and founded an agricultural settlement in Be'er Ya'akov, Israel. In 1907 the settlement was named after Yitzhak.

Approximately from the middle of the 19th century, the Rabbi of Derbent was recognized by the Russian authorities as the Chief Rabbi of the Mountain Jews of Southern Dagestan and Azerbaijan.

The main occupation of the Jews of Derbent was viticulture and winemaking, madder cultivation, which fell into decline by the end of the 19th century, and fisheries since the beginning of the 20th century. The largest fishing company in Dagestan was owned by the Dadashev family.

Though most Ashkenazi Jews in the Russian empire were denied the right to live outside the Pale of Settlement, from 1860 some of those who had permission to do so settled in Derbent. The Jews of Derbent conducted a large wholesale trade, mainly in agricultural products, and owned about 30 manufacturing shops and 160 gardens.

- In 1900, one of the four synagogues in Derbent was Ashkenazi. The total number of Jews in Derbent increased from 472 in 1835 to 2190 in 1897 (about 15% of the population).
- In 1900, Rabbi Yaakov Itskhaki’s sons Meir and Naftali organized the Zionist circle "Bnei Zion" in Derbent.
- In 1904, Rabbi Yashaiyo Rabinovich (1904 -1937?) opened the Mountain Jewish School.
- In 1904-1919, the Jewish theater worked under the direction of Rabbi Yashaiyo Rabinovich.
- In 1914, there were Jewish schools and a Realschule in Derbent.
- In June 1917, the All-Caucasian Congress of Mountain Jews was held in Derbent.
- In August 1918, Russian units retreating from Iran under the command of Lazar Bicherakhov entered Derbent. Soldiers and officers robbed and murdered Jews.

=== Soviet Union ===
- During the Revolution and Civil War in Dagestan (March 1917 - May 1919), many Jews from the mountain villages settled in Derbent, fleeing the disasters of the war. In 1926, 6,745 Jews lived in Derbent, in 1939 - 8,100, in 1959 - 12,700, in 1970 - 14,600, in 1979 - 12,900, in 1989 - 12,700.
- In 1930, a Jewish collective farm named after Smidovich was created in the vicinity of Derbent.
- In 1933 were about 30 Jewish collective farms in the vicinity of Derbent.
- In 1928-1941 a newspaper of Mountain Jews was published in Derbent: The Toiler in the Judeo-Tat language.
- In 1935 there were two Jewish secondary schools, the Jewish department of the Pedagogical College and the Jewish department of the Carpet College, and Jewish clubs.
- In 1948, teaching in the Judeo-Tat language was abolished, and all schools for Mountain Jews were closed.
- In the late 1980s and early 2000s, many Derbent Jews left for Israel, the United States, Germany, Canada and other countries. In 1997, 593 Jews from Derbent left for Israel, in 1998 - 182 Jews, in 1999 - 441 Jews, in 2000 - 432 Jews, in 2001 - 417 Jews and in 2002 - 102 Jews.

In the 1970s, in Derbent as throughout the Soviet Union, the state policy of "tatization" of Mountain Jews began. Representatives of the Soviet elite, mainly in Dagestan, denied the connection of the Mountain Jews with other Jews. Mountain Jews were registered in official statistics as Tat, which constituted the vast majority of this community in the RSFSR.

After the collapse of the USSR in 1991, most of the Jews emigrated from Derbent. In 2002 there were 2,000 Jews in the city.

On July 12, 2018, the grand opening of the Immortal Regiment memorial took place on the territory of the Jewish cemetery. The names of 1732 Jewish soldiers who fell in battle, died from wounds and went missing are carved on the memorial plate. This list is not complete. Search work to clarify the front-line fates of the war participants continues.

=== Russian Federation ===
In the 2024 Dagestan attacks, a synagogue in Derbent was set on fire by armed gunmen, possibly affiliated with ISIS.

== Mountain Jews in censuses ==
Year	Number, people	Percentage of the city's total population,%
1886	2568	16,8 %
1897	2181	14,9 %
1939	7 604	22,3 %
1959	11 705	24,7 %
1979	12 918	19,2 %
1989	13 119	16,9 %
2010	1345	1,1 %
2021	620	0,5 %

== Notable Jews of Derbent ==
- Shatiel Abramov (1918-2004), Red Army officer in World War II.
- Abram Avdalimov (1929-2004), Soviet, Russian folk singer, stage actor, and the theater director
- Daniil Atnilov (1913-1968), poet
- Djumshud Ashurov (1913–1980), composer
- Yuno Avshalumov (1934–1981), composer
- Mishi Bakhshiev (1910-1972), writer and poet
- Manuvakh Dadashev (1913-1943), poet
- Mikhail Dadashev (1936), writer
- Mikhail Gavrilov (1926-2014), writer and poet
- Boris Gavrilov (1908-1990), writer
- Raziil Ilyaguev (1944-2016), stage actor and artistic director
- Roman Izyaev (1940-2018), Soviet, Russian and Israeli stage actor, artistic director
- Sergey Izgiyayev (1922-1972), poet
- Mozol Izrailova (1955), actress
- Lev Manakhimov (1950–2021), choreographer and director
- Bikel Matatova (1928–2013), actress
- Yagutil Mishiev (1927-2024), historian, writer and educator
- Mushail Mushailov (1941-2007), artist
- Tamara Musakhanov (1924-2014), Soviet sculptor and ceramist
- Albert Solomonov, Soviet football player and Israeli coach and commentator.
- Akhso Shalumova (1907–1985), actress
- Robert Tiviaev, Israeli politician
- Sara Shor (Jasmin), singer
- Zoya Semenduyeva (1929-2020), poet
- Israel Tsvaygenbaum, artist
- Yaakov Yitzhaki (1846-1917), rabbi and scholar
- Igor Yusufov, former Russian energy Minister

== Bibliography ==
- Anisimov I. Sh., Caucasian Jews - Highlanders. - M .: "Science", 2002.

== See also ==
- Derbent Synagogue
- Judaism in Dagestan
- Judeo-Tat
- Judeo-Tat literature
- Judeo-Tat theatre
- Legends of the Jewish Quarter in Derbent (in Russian)
- Mountain Jews
