= Mozol Izrailova =

- Мозол Израилова
- Born: Mozol Aleksandrovna Izrailova; March 18, 1955 (age 71); Derbent, Dagestan ASSR, Soviet Union
- Occupation: Stage actor
- Years active: 1972–2017
- Title: Honored Worker of Culture of the Republic of Dagestan

Mozol Aleksandrovna Izrailova (Russian: Мозол Александровна Израилова; Hebrew: מוזול איזריילובה; 1955) is a Soviet and Russian actress of the Judeo-Tat Theatre. By the Decree of the Presidium of the Supreme Council of Dagestan, for many years of work and high merits in the field of culture, Mozol Izrailova was awarded the title of "Honored Worker of Culture of the Republic of Dagestan."

== Biography ==
Mozol Izrailova was born in Derbent, Dagestan, into a Mountain Jewish family.

Her interest in theatre began in childhood. After finishing school, she often attended performances with her family. She was drawn to positive heroes, loved designing costumes, and enjoyed performing in front of friends and parents.

In 1972, at the age of seventeen, Mozol Izrailova began working as an actress in the Judeo-Tat Theater. At the time, the theater was led by Abram Avdalimov. She collaborated with renowned theater actors such as Bikel Matatova (1928–2013), Avshalum (Shori) Nakhshunov (1925–1997), Raziil Ilyaguev (1944–2016), Roman Izyaev (1940–2018), Eva Shalver, and many others.

Mozol Izrailova performed in numerous theater productions, often in leading roles. In Hizgil Avshalumov's comedy play Khan and Vizier, she portrayed a servant. In The Fortune Teller-Deceiver (Judeo-Tat: Дургуне фолчи), she played Ostigras. In Uzeyir Hajibeyov's play Mother-in-Law (Judeo-Tat: Гайнана), she took on the role of the bride, Sevda. In the play based on the play by Mikhail Dadashev, False tradition (Judeo-Tat: Дургуне гIэдот), she played the role of the wife, Asnat. Mozol Izrailova played in the comedy based on the play by Yuno Semyonov Regrets for not learning (Judeo-Tat: Пешмуни не хундеи). She also played in Irina Mikhailova's play Let's Get Married (Judeo-Tat: Биё эвленмиш бошим), where she played the role of the TV show host, Momo Khanukaeva.

Mozol Izrailova performed with the theater in Izberbash and Makhachkala, as well as in Kabardino-Balkaria, Nalchik, and Qırmızı Qəsəbə.

Mozol Izrailova also worked as an assistant director at the theater, where she taught novice actors sight-reading and assisted with acting. The main director was Lev Manakhimov.

She speaks Azerbaijani fluently and understands Lezgin and Tabasaran.

Around 2018, Mozol Izrailova stopped performing in the theater and left Derbent.

== Literature ==
- Mikhailova, Irina (2014). Самородки Дагестана [Gifted of Dagestan] (in Russian). Makhachkala. Russia. p. 11.

== Awards ==
- Honored Worker of Culture of the Republic of Dagestan
