= Bikel Matatova =

- Бикель Мататова
- Born: Bikel Peysakhovna Matatova; August 20, 1928; Derbent, Dagestan ASSR, Soviet Union
- Died: May 16, 2013 (aged 84); Hadera, Israel
- Occupation: Stage actor
- Years active: 1941–2007

Bikel Peysakhovna Matatova (Russian: Бикель Пейсаховна Мататова; Hebrew: ביקל מטטוב; 1928–2013) was a Soviet, and Israeli actress of the Judeo-Tat Theatre and an "Honored Artist of the Dagestan ASSR." In 1990, by the Decree of the Presidium of the Supreme Council of the Dagestan ASSR, Bikel Matatova was awarded the title of "Honored Workers of Culture of the Dagestan ASSR." In 1948, she received an honorary diploma for "25 years of service in cultural leadership over the armed forces of the USSR."

== Biography ==
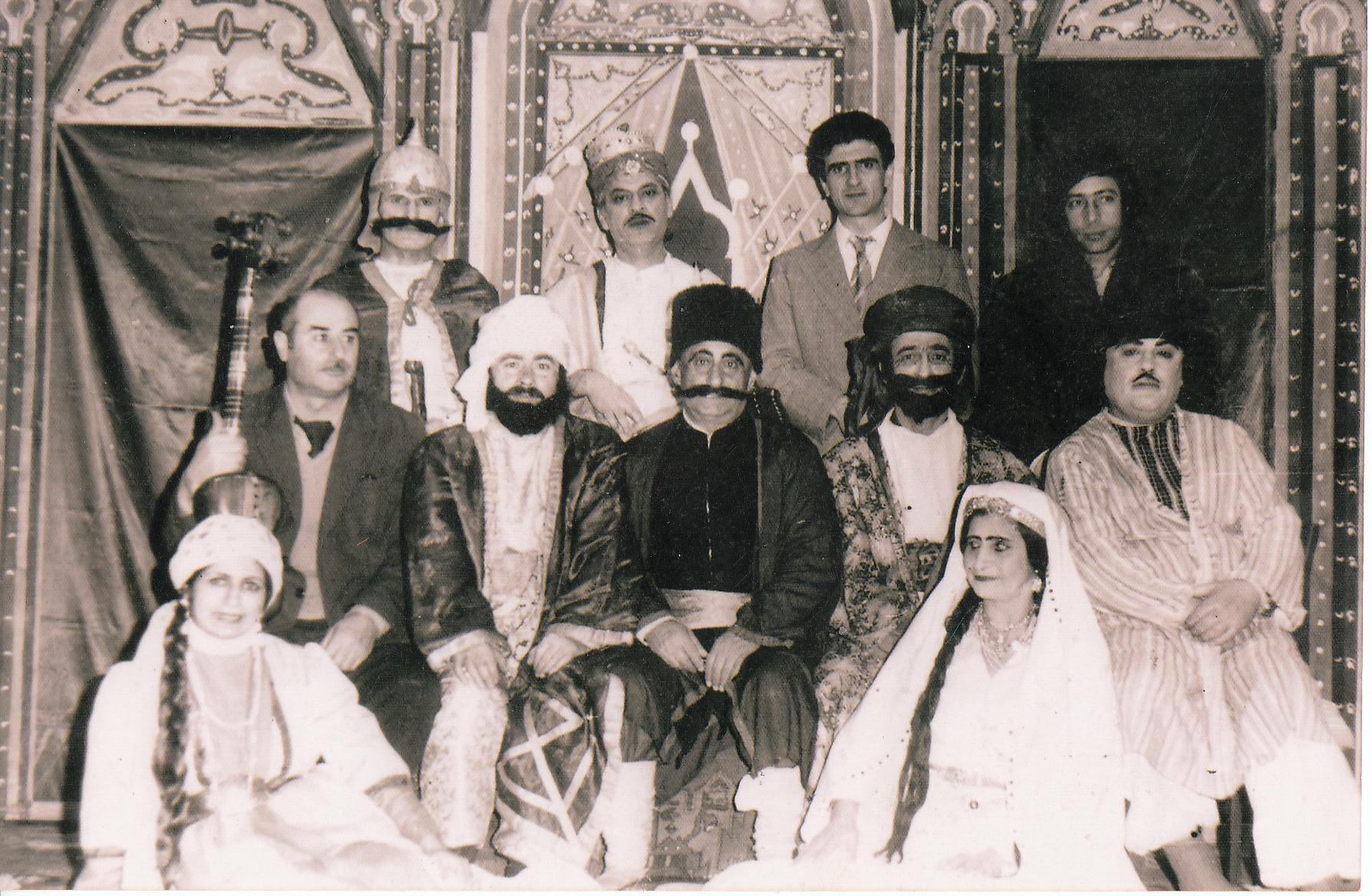
Acting troupe in the play Ashig Garib. Judeo-Tat theatre. Derbent, USSR. 1984. First row - from left to right: Katya, Bikel Matatova. Second row - from left to right: musician Israel Izrailov, Roman Izyaev, Avshalum Nakhshunov, Raziil Ilyaguev, Abram Avdalimov. Third row - from left to right: Ilizir Abramov, Anatoly Yusupov, Israel Tsvaygenbaum.

Bikel Matatova was born on August 20, 1928, in Derbent and grew up in a narrow, cramped neighborhood on Tagi-Zade Street, near the synagogue. She was the eldest of four siblings. In 1933, her father, Pisakh Matatov, died at the age of 33. After his death, her mother, Istire-Melke, raised the children alone. To support the family, she worked in the Caspian fishing industry, pulling heavy nets from the water alongside the men. As she worked, she sang songs.

Several actors from the Judeo-Tat Theatre worked with her, including Yuno Semyonov, as well as musicians: Ishchey, who played the tambourine; Yunoshkei, the kamancheh; and Rifke, the tar. Mukhoil Faradzhev served as the theater's prompter.

In 1936, a state drama theater, combining Azerbaijanis and Mountain Jews performances, operated in Derbent. The theater had a musical group led by composer Djumshud Ashurov. The actors encouraged Bikel Matatova's mother to take a role in one of their performances. It was through this experience that young Bikel discovered her love for the theater.

Bikel Matatova studied at the Derbent School named after Maxim Gorky, where instruction was conducted in her native Judeo-Tat language using the Latin alphabet. During these years, she had already made her choice—she wanted to become a theater actress. Her entire future was tied to the stage. After classes, she would run to the theater, attentively listen to rehearsals, memorize all the roles, and perform and sing at home. This passion defined her school years from 1937 to 1939.

Bikel began performing on stage at a young age and soon became an actress. Her first role in the theater was as a ball in the play Shah Abbas. She performed alongside her mother, as well as many actors and actresses of the State Mountain Jewish Theater.

As her career progressed, Bikel Matatova took on numerous roles and traveled with the theater to various places where Mountain Jews lived, bringing her performances to audiences far and wide.

During the World War II, the Judeo-Tat Theatre, like the entire Soviet Union, faced difficult times. Bikel Matatova wrote in her memoirs:

“In 1941, the war with the Nazi Germany began, and our actors were called to the front. Our theater was orphaned. Those who remained did not know what to do. But despite the hardships, the theater continued to operate—we traveled to villages and cities, performing in hospitals for the wounded. Both my mother and I sang songs. In 1943–1944, the theater switched to cost accounting.

We had the opportunity to perform in many villages and cities: Khoshmenzil, Aglobi, Myushkur, Guba, Khanzhalkala, Qusar, Madzhalis, Nalchik, Makhachkala, and Grozny. In 1944–1945, I performed in a play by Djumshud Ashurov dedicated to the life of Kabardino-Balkaria, playing the role of Gogo—a young partisan who voluntarily went to the front. For my talented performance in this role, I was awarded an honorary diploma from the Presidium of the Supreme Soviet of the USSR and received a valuable gift.

In 1946, the theater was closed. Along with other actors, I was transferred to the Azerbaijani theater, as we all spoke Azerbaijani. I worked there for three years, but in 1949, that theater was closed as well. I felt devastated—I could not live without the stage without working in the theater.”

Soon, the situation changed when the Lenin collective farm began supporting actors by organizing performances for collective farmers. Bikel Matatova, along with her mother and fellow actors, gave concerts for the community.

She and her mother were later invited to work in Khuchni, the administrative center of Tabasaransky District. During the day, they worked in the library, and in the evenings, they rehearsed. Eventually, Bikel was appointed as the artistic director of the House of Culture, allowing her to continue her passion for theater.

After returning to Derbent, Bikel Matatova performed in many plays, including Mashadi Ibad, where she played the role of Gulnaz, and Ashiq Qarib, where she portrayed Shahsenem. In the play The Five-Ruble Bride, with a libretto by Mammed Said Ordubadi and music composed by Said Rustamov, she was entrusted with the role of Naz-Naz. Matatova continued to take on musical roles until 1960.

In 1961, the director staged Sergey Izgiyayev's play Cousin, which depicted the life of Mountain Jews. Bikel Matatova played the role of the milkmaid Gyuli, while her mother portrayed the elderly woman Memeli. That same year, the opera-play Leili and Majnun was staged, translated into Tat by Izgiyaev. Matatova played the lead role of Leili, while her mother took on the role of Majnun's mother. In 1963, she starred as the title character in Aykhanum at the age of 35.

In 1964, the State Judeo-Tat Theatre was closed due to a lack of funding, leading to the revival of an amateur theater group. Abram Avdalimov became its leader, and during this period, collective farms were restructured into state farms. In 1967, the theater was reestablished as the People's Theater, with Musaib Dzhum-Dzhum as the director and Avdalimov as his assistant. The actors rehearsed during the day and performed in the evenings. Bikel Matatova continued to act in all productions, often playing leading roles.

In 1975, actress Istire-Melke, the mother of Bikel Matatova, died.

The People's Judeo-Tat Theatre remained active from 1967 to 1992, with Matatova performing alongside both veteran and new actors.

In the 1991, Bikel Matatova emigrated to Israel.

In 2001, in the city of Hadera, under the direction of Roman Izyaev, the Judeo-Tat Theatre of Musical Comedy, Rambam, was established. This marked a new stage in Bikel Matatova's career. She was delighted to return to the stage she cherished, where she once again sang, danced, and performed.

Bikel Matatova died in 2013 in Hadera, Israel.

== Legacy ==
Her memoirs, written in Juhuri, were published in the almanac Govleyi in two issues—No. 21 (1994) and No. 22 (1995).

Bikel Matatova's stage performances inspired the famous poet Sergei Izgiyaev, who wrote the poem Bickel for her.

On October 12, 2009, at the first arts festival, Pearls of the Caucasus, held in Netanya, Israel, Honored Artist of Dagestan Bikel Matatova was invited to the stage and presented with an honorary certificate in celebration of her 80th birthday and the 65th anniversary of her stage career.

== Awards ==
- Honored Artist of the DASSR
- 1991, Honored Workers of Culture of the Dagestan ASSR
- 1948, An honorary diploma for "Services in the field of cultural patronage of the Armed Forces of the USSR"

== Literature ==
- Mikhailova, Irina (2014). Самородки Дагестана [Gifted of Dagestan] (in Russian). Makhachkala. Russia. p. 36.

== See also ==
- Judeo-Tat Theatre
