= Raziil Ilyaguev =

- Разиил Ильягуев
- Born: Raziil Semenovich Ilyaguev; 20 July 1944; Derbent, Dagestan ASSR, Soviet Union
- Died: 17 June 2016 (aged 71); Beersheba, Israel
- Occupations: Stage actor, artistic director, and music teacher
- Years active: 1965–2002
- Title: Honored Cultural Worker of the Republic of Dagestan

Raziil Semenovich Ilyaguev (Russian: Разиил Семенович Ильягуев; Hebrew: ;רזיאל איליאגוייב 20 July, 1944 – June 17, 2016) was a Soviet and Russian stage actor, artistic director of the Judeo-Tat theatre. He also taught clarinet at a music college in Derbent.

In recognition of his long-standing contribution to the development of culture and music education, as well as his more than twenty-six years of service in the theater, Ilyaguev was awarded the title of "Honored Cultural Worker of the Republic of Dagestan" by decree of the State Council of the Republic of Dagestan on 15 August 2002, and was presented with the corresponding badge.

== Biography ==
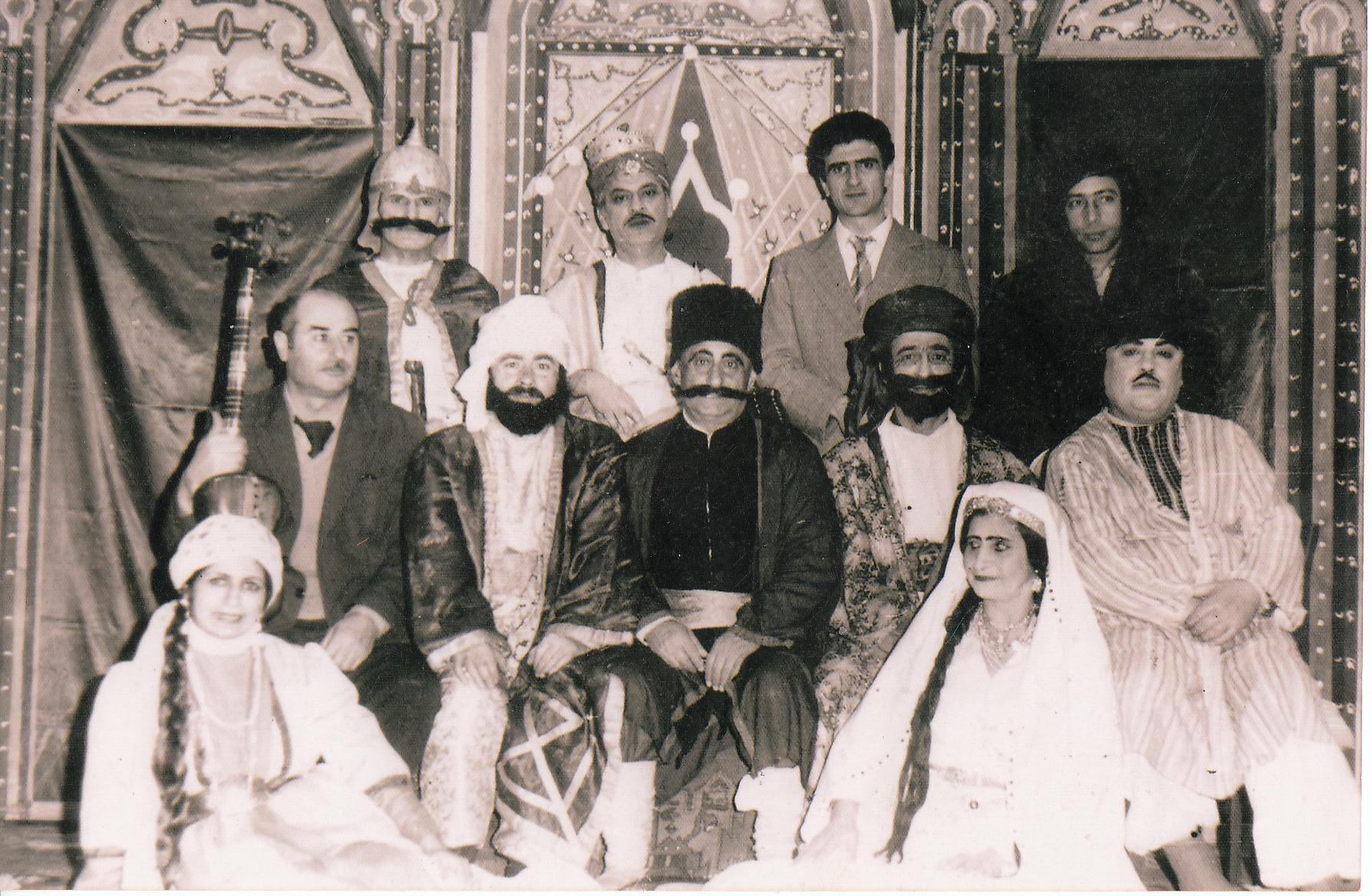
Acting troupe in the play Ashig Garib. Judeo-Tat theatre. Derbent, USSR. 1984. First row - from left to right: Katya, Bikel Matatova. Second row - from left to right: musician Israel Izrailov, Roman Izyaev, Avshalum Nakhshunov, Raziil Ilyaguev, Abram Avdalimov. Third row - from left to right: Ilizir Abramov, Anatoly Yusupov, Israel Tsvaygenbaum.

Raziel Ilyaguev was born in 1944 in Derbent, Dagestan, Soviet Union. From an early age, he attended a music club at the local collective farm cultural center. He later played the trumpet in the orchestra organized there, where he received his first salary at the age of 13. After completing nine grades in 1959, Ilyaguev transferred to an evening school to devote more time to his passion for music. He began traveling to Makhachkala to take lessons from the renowned violinist and composer Khizgil Mikhailovich Khanukaev.

Ilyaguev subsequently became a student at the Makhachkala Music College. While studying there, he also worked as a clarinetist in a symphony orchestra. Upon returning to Derbent in 1965, he began teaching at a music school and directed both brass and variety orchestras. When a clarinet class was established at the Derbent Music School, Raziel Ilyaguev was appointed its instructor. Sometime later, he became head of a similar department at the Cultural Education College.

In 1969, Ilyaguev enrolled in the correspondence program at the Kazan Conservatory, which he successfully completed. He then began teaching at the music college that had recently opened in Derbent.

In the early 1980s, Ilyaguev was appointed director of a House of Culture, where he quickly reorganized the work of its various clubs and activities, established new music programs, and involved at-risk teenagers in them to foster their appreciation and understanding of music.

=== Theatre ===
Since 1976, Raziel Ilyaguev has been a member of the troupe of the Judeo-Tat Theatre in Derbent, where he performed numerous roles. In the play "Khan and the Viziers" by Hizgil Avshalumov, he portrayed the vizier David, a trusted adviser to the Tabasaran Khan. In the musical comedy "If the Heart Desires", written by Dagestani playwright and director Hamid Rustamov in collaboration with composer Gotfrid Hasanov, Ilyaguev played the role of Mahmud, a poor man in love with the daughter of a wealthy landowner. The music for the production was composed by Djumshud Ashurov. In the play "Peri-Khanum" by Boris Gavrilov, Ilyaguev played the role of a shepherd, while the title role of Peri was performed by actress Bikel Matatova.

Ilyaguev approached the creation of each stage character in a distinctive manner. His Tahir in "The Five-Ruble Bride" was a respected scholar, while Kansho in "Give Me Back My Wife" was portrayed as an arrogant and boastful speculator seeking to buy the love of a young woman. For the production of "Mullah Nasriddin", a musical comedy based on a play by Magomed Kurbanov, a classic of Dagestani drama, Ilyaguev played the villain Azrael, the angel of death, and also wrote several humorous songs for the production.

In 2000, the Judeo-Tat Theatre became a municipal theater. From 2000 to 2002, Ilyaguev served as a stage director there. During this period, he staged productions of "Mashadi Ibad" by Uzeyir Hajibeyov and "If Not That One, Then This One", in which he also performed the role of the journalist Rza Bey, a Turkish subject. In 2001, he directed a stage adaptation of excerpts from "Toothache", based on the play of the same name by Mikhail Dadashev.

In 2002, Raziil Ilyaguev and his wife, Burliyant, repatriated to Israel to reunite with their children—Simkha, Avraham, and Svetlana—who were already living there.

Raziil Ilyaguyev died in Beersheba, Israel, on June 17, 2016, at the age of 71.

== See also ==
- Judeo-Tat theatre
