= Abram Avdalimov =

Soviet Russian folk singer

- Born: Abram Borisovich Avdalimov; September 10, 1929; Derbent, Dagestan ASSR, Soviet Union
- Died: 27 January 2004 (aged 74); Derbent, Dagestan, Russia
- Occupations: Stage actor, folk singer, theatre director
- Years active: 1960–2004
- Awards: Honored Worker of Culture of the Dagestan ASSR (1967)

Abram Borisovich Avdalimov (Russian: Абрам Борисович Авдалимов; Hebrew: ;אברם אבדלימוב September 10, 1929 – January 27, 2004) was a Soviet, Russian folk singer, stage actor and theatre director. Honored Worker of Culture of the Dagestan ASSR (1967). Co-founder of the Judeo-Tat theatre in Dagestan. He made a great contribution to the development of Dagestan culture.

== Biography ==
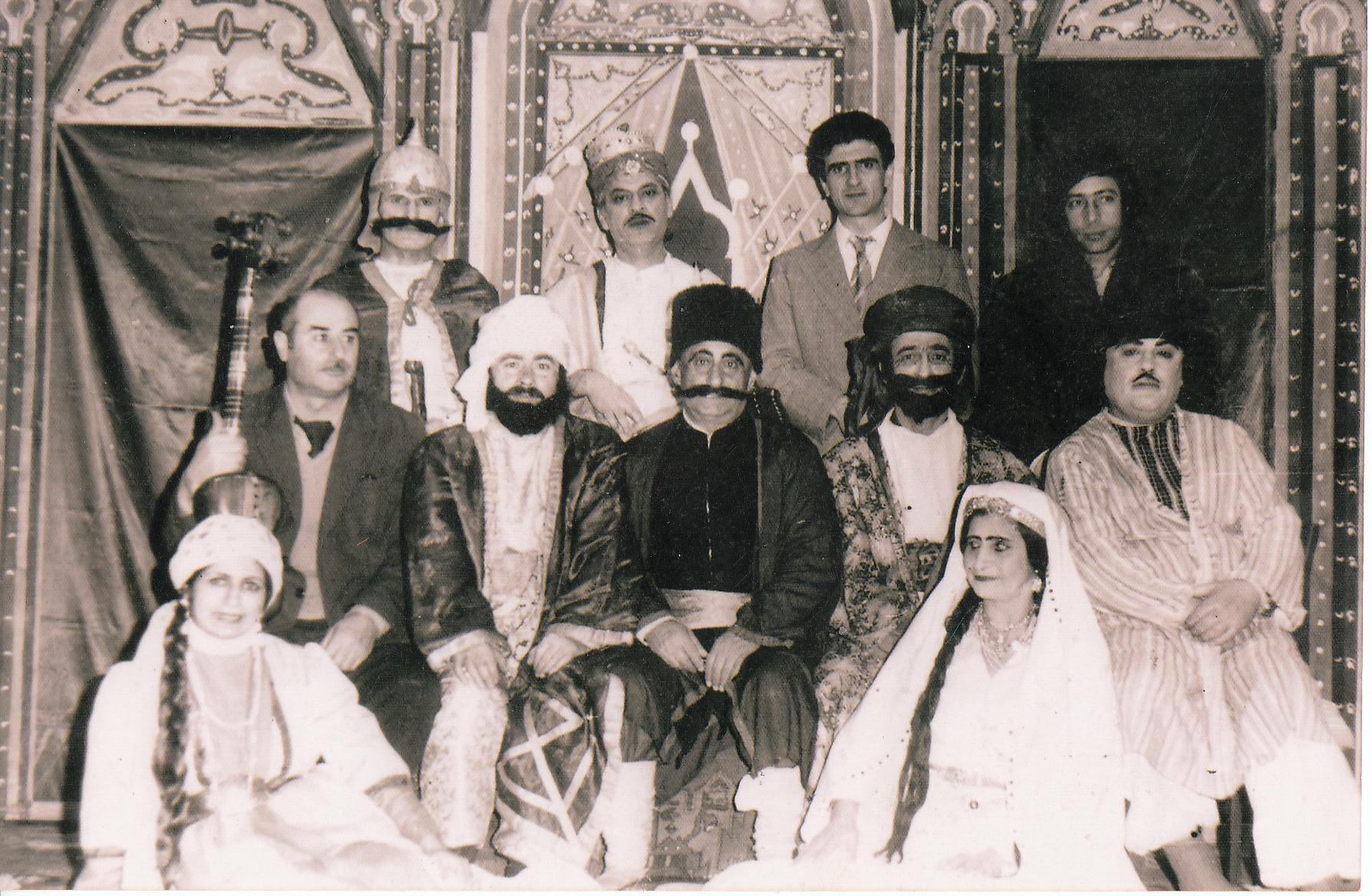
Acting troupe in the play Ashig Garib. Judeo-Tat theatre. Derbent, USSR. 1984. First row - from left to right: Katya, Bikel Matatova. Second row - from left to right: musician Israel Izrailov, Roman Izyaev, Avshalum Nakhshunov, Raziil Ilyaguev, Abram Avdalimov. Third row - from left to right: Ilizir Abramov, Anatoly Yusupov, Israel Tsvaygenbaum.

Abram Avdalimov was born in 1929 in the city of Derbent into a family of musicians and stage actors. His grandfather Shamay played the viola, and his father Baaz Avdalimov worked in the theater of folk art.

During his childhood, Abram Avdalimov began to get involved in singing, performing on the stage of the Judeo-Tat theatre. Participated in the folklore festival in the city of Moscow.

In 1960, Abram Avdalimov got a job at the Judeo-Tat theatre as a stage actor. In 1967, he was awarded the title "Honored Worker of Culture of the Dagestan ASSR".

Abram Avdalimov graduated in absentia from the directing faculty of the Derbent School of Music named after A. B. Avdalimov. During his studies, he performed and worked as a director of the Judeo-Tat theatre.

Abram Avdalimov's repertoire included more than twenty performances. He staged various plays; (ru:«Увядшие цветы») - "Withered flowers", (ru:«Пери-Ханум») - "Peri-Khanum", (ru:«Ашуг-Гариб») - "Ashug Garib" and (ru:«Лейла») - "Leila", about a revolutionary who fought against capitalism.

Abram Avdalimov the author of two plays; (ru:«Я буду ждать») - "I'll be waiting" and (ru:«Он не виноват») - "It's not his fault".

In 1985, Abram Avdalimov received a diploma for performing at the "All-Union Review of Amateur Artistic Creativity", on the stage of the Bolshoi Theater in Moscow, Russia.

Abram Avdalimov died on January 27, 2004, in Derbent.

== Legacy ==
On August 2, 2017, a memorial plaque in honor of Abram Avdalimov was unveiled and renamed in his honor a street in Derbent where he lived.

== See also ==
- Judeo-Tat Theatre

== Literature ==
- A. B. Avdalimov (1929–2004)// Dagestankaya Pravda - January 30, 2004. - p. 4.
- Bagishev E. "On the glorious path": A. B. Avdalimov // A newspaper "Communist", November 14, 1979. (Lezgian language).
