= Gyulboor Davydova =

Russian winegrower

- Born: Gyulboor Shaulovna Davydova; March 8, 1892; Khoshmenzil, Dagestan Oblast, Russian Empire
- Died: April 9, 1983 (aged 91); Derbent, Dagestan ASSR, Soviet Union
- Occupation: Winegrower

Gyulboor Shaulovna Davydova (Russian: Гюльбоо́р Шау́ловна Давы́дова; March 8, 1892 – April 9, 1983) was a Soviet winegrower of Mountain Jewish descent. She was a manager of the collective farm named after Kaganovich in the Dagestan ASSR, the Soviet Union. She was an awardee of the Hero of Socialist Labor (1949).

== Biography ==
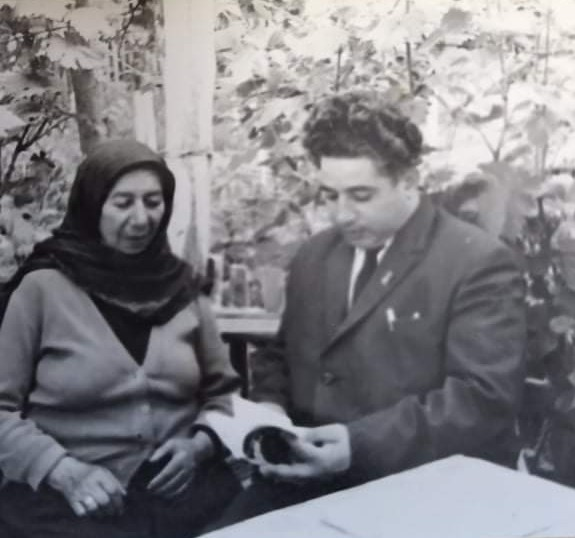
Gyulboor Davydova and poet Sergey Izgiyayev in 1967.

Gyulboor Davydova was born on March 8, 1892, in the Mountain Jewish village of Khoshmenzil, Dagestan Oblast, Russian Empire, in a peasant family. Since childhood, she worked in the fields and helped her parents. After the death of her husband, she was left with two little children.

In 1928, when the collective farm “New Life” was formed in the village, Gyulboor Davydova was not accepted into it, believing that women could not work on an equal basis with men. Then she gathered 14 widowed farmworkers and organized a women's collective farm, to which women named it “Red Farmwoman”, and Gyulboor Davydova was elected chairwoman. The women's collective farm completed the spring sowing, prepared the ground for melon crops, and their yield turned out to be higher than in the men's agricultural farm. Subsequently, both of these collective farms merged into one large farm.

Two of Davydova's sons, David and Ruvin, died in the Great Patriotic War.

On July 27, 1949, for obtaining high grape yields in 1948, the title of Hero of Socialist Labor was awarded to her by the decree of Presidium of the Supreme Soviet, the highest body of state authority in the Union of Soviet Socialist Republics (USSR). Gyulboor Davydova was only Mountain Jewish woman who was awarded such a high award.

Gyulboor Davydova was repeatedly elected as a deputy of the Presidium of the Supreme Council of the Dagestan Autonomous Soviet Socialist Republic, as well as a deputy of the local Council of People's Deputies.

Davydova died on April 9, 1983, and was buried at the Jewish cemetery in Derbent.

== Awards ==
- Hero of Socialist Labor
- Order of Lenin
- Medal "For the Defence of the Caucasus"

== Legacy ==
- A street in the city of Derbent is named after Gulboor Davydova.
- A memorial plaque was installed on the facade of a building in Derbent, where Gulboor Davydova lived, to honor her memory.
- Agricultural firm named after Gulboor Davydova (former collective farm named after Kaganovich)
- A poem “Gyulboor” by the Mountain Jewish writer Hizgil Avshalumov is dedicated to Gyulboor Davydova.
- Poet Sergey Izgiyayev wrote the lyrics for the song “Gyulboor” that he dedicated to Gyulboor Davydova. The music was written by Djumshud Ashurov.
