= Djumshud Ashurov =

Soviet-Juhuri composer

- Джумшуд Ашуров
- Born: Shumshul Ashurov; 9 May 1913; Derbent, Dagestan Oblast, Russian Empire
- Died: 15 February 1980 (aged 66); Derbent, Dagestan Oblast, Soviet Russia, Soviet Union
- Occupation: Composer
- Works: Gyulboor, Gyuzel Yar

Djumshud Shevanyaevich Ashurov (born Shumshul Ashurov; Russian: Джумшуд Шеваньяевич Ашуров; Hebrew: ג'ומשוד אשורוב; 1913–1980) was the first Soviet composer of Mountain Jewish origin. In 1961, he was awarded the title of "Honored Artist of the Dagestan ASSR". On 10 April 1970, on behalf of the Presidium of the Supreme Soviet of the USSR, he was awarded the Jubilee Medal "In Commemoration of the 100th Anniversary of the Birth of Vladimir Ilyich Lenin". Djumshud Ashurov was the first Mountain Jewish composer.

== Biography ==
Djumshud Ashurov was born on 9 May 1913, in Derbent, Dagestan Oblast, an administrative-territorial entity in the Russian Empire.

In 1930, he entered the Derbent Pedagogical College, where he tried to write his own musical compositions, composed songs, and created an instrumental piece.

After graduating from the Derbent Pedagogical College, he worked as a tar player in the Judeo-Tat Theatre and composed several songs, an instrumental march piece titled Dawn of the East, and a dance piece called Spring Bird.

In 1935, he was sent to the Moscow Conservatory, but had to discontinue his studies due to illness. In 1937, after returning to Derbent, he founded the South Dagestan State National Ensemble.

At the same time, he worked in the Azerbaijani and Judeo-Tat theaters, composing music for Alexander Shirvanzade's drama Namus and Mishi Bakhshiev's play Victory of Heroes. He also wrote the march To the 15th Anniversary of the DASSR and the dances Djumshud and Izberbash.

In 1938, Djumshud Ashurov moved to Baku, where he became the head of the music department at the House of Azerbaijani Creativity and took composition lessons from Uzeyir Hajibeyov.

In 1940, Ashurov's song In Our Country won second prize at the republican competition. That same year, after completing advanced training courses for composers in Moscow, he returned to Derbent and worked as the musical director of the Azerbaijani and Judeo-Tat theaters. His play Kyzburun, dedicated to the Soviet Army, was staged there.

In 1949, he began a creative collaboration with the Lezgin Theater named after Suleyman Stalsky, composing music for many of its performances.

In 1955, Djumshud Ashurov wrote a suite for tar and piano.

He composed music for performances at the Lezgin Theater named after Suleyman Stalsky, as well as for plays by his fellow countrymen Hizgil Avshalumov Sash of childlessness, Yuno Semyonov Freedom Fighters, and Sergey Izgiyayev Cousin. He also wrote music for three dances: Khars, Violet, Wedding of the Highlanders, performed by the Lezginka ensemble. His songs, including Gyulboor, Gyuzel Yar (a Lezgin song), Song About Derbent, and Makhachkala, became widely known.

In the last years of his life, Djumshud Ashurov composed the music for the documentary film Derbent.

For his participation in defensive operations and artistic service to military units and hospitals during the Great Patriotic War, Djumshud Ashurov was awarded three government honors: "For the Defense of the Caucasus", "For Valiant Labour in the Great Patriotic War 1941–1945", and "For the Victory over Germany in the Great Patriotic War 1941–1945".

== Personal life ==
Ashurov was married to Mazol. The couple raised four children. Their eldest son, Semyon Ashurov, was awarded the title of "Honored Worker of Culture of the Republic of Dagestan", and taught piano at the Derbent Music College. Their other son, Oshir Ashurov, graduated from the music college, specializing in "choral conducting". Ashurov had two daughters, Yafa and Mira.

Djumshud Ashurov died on 15 February 1980, and was buried in the Jewish cemetery in Derbent.

== Awards ==
- Honored Artist of the Dagestan ASSR (1961)
- Jubilee Medal "In Commemoration of the 100th Anniversary of the Birth of Vladimir Ilyich Lenin"
- Medal "For the Defence of the Caucasus"
- Medal "For Valiant Labour in the Great Patriotic War 1941–1945"
- Medal "For the Victory over Germany in the Great Patriotic War 1941–1945"

== Legacy ==
In 2018, Derbent Music College was named after Djumshud Ashurov.

A memorial plaque was installed on the wall of the house where Djumshud Ashurov lived.

In 2013, Derbent celebrated the centenary of Djumshud Ashurov, the first composer of Mountain Jewish heritage.

== Literature ==
- Amirov, Laser (November 2002). "Life in Song". Kavkazskaya Gazeta. No. 16–17. Israel. p. 18.
- Abramov, Khananil (2006). Brief Encyclopedia of Mountain Jews.
- Mikhailova, Irina (2014). Самородки Дагестана [Gifted of Dagestan] (in Russian). Makhachkala. Russia. pp. 40–43.
