= Azerbaijani Drama Theatre =

Theatre in Derbent, Russia

Muslim Magomayev Azerbaijani State Musical Drama Theatre, Derbent
- Азербайджанский государственный музыкально-драматический театр им. Муслима Магомаева (Дербент)
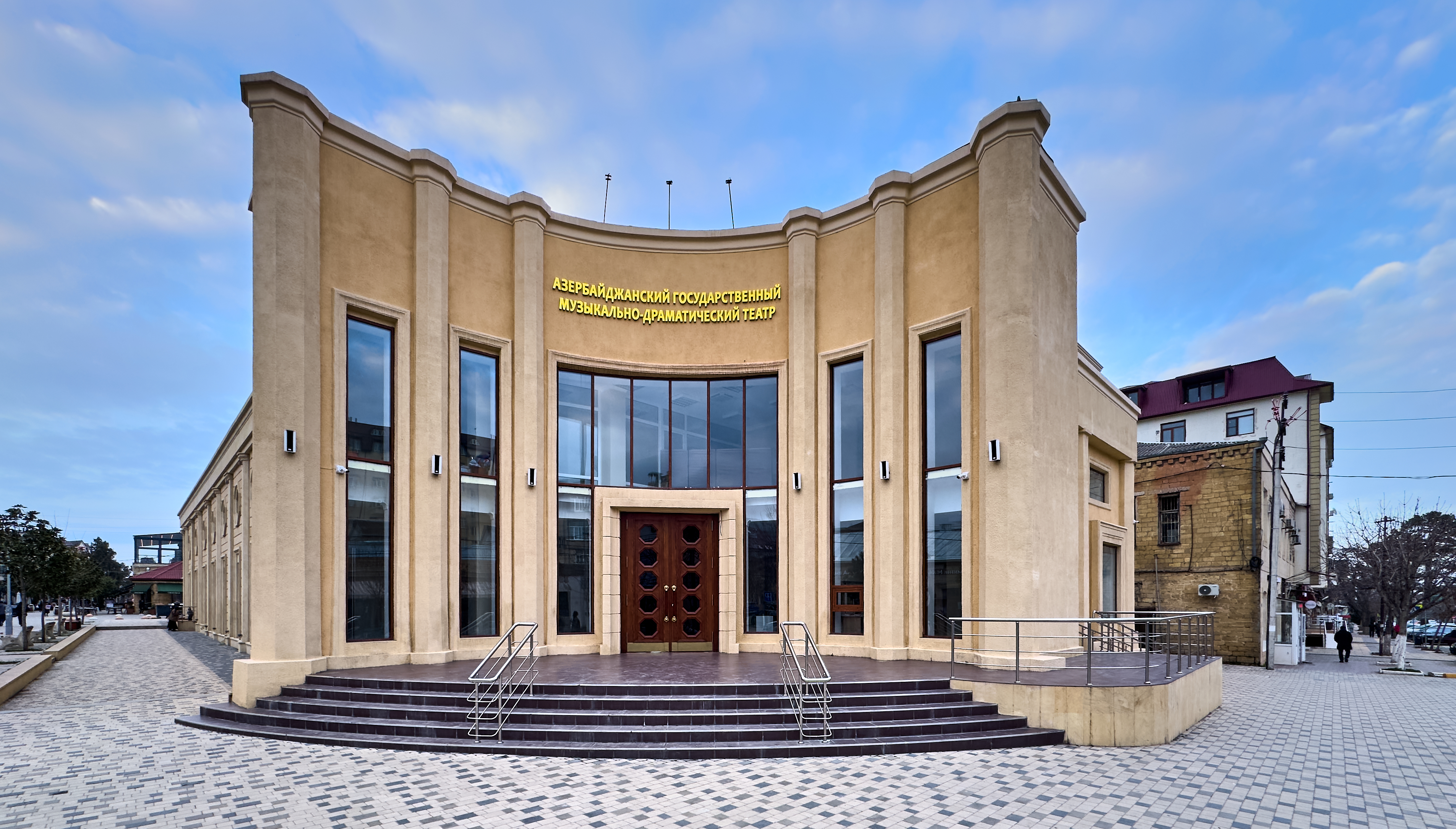
- Muslim Magomayev Azerbaijani State Musical Drama Theatre, Derbent
- Interactive map of Muslim Magomayev; Azerbaijani State Musical Drama Theatre, Derbent
- Address: Derbent; Russia
- Coordinates: 42°03′27″N 48°17′48″E
- Owner: Russian Federation
- Capacity: 272 места

Construction
- Opened: 1904; 122 years ago
- Reopened: March 27, 2026
- Rebuilt: 2021

Website
- https://azer-teatr.ru

Muslim Magomayev Azerbaijani State Musical Drama Theatre (Azerbaijani: Azərbaycan Dövlət Dram Teatrı) is a cultural institution of the Republic of Dagestan (Russia). It is located in Derbent at 42 Lenin Street. It is the only state theatre in the Russian Federation that performs in the Azerbaijani language.

== History ==
=== Russian Empire ===
In the mid-1880s, an amateur Turkic (Azerbaijani) drama circle was established in Derbent at the initiative of members of the Azerbaijani intelligentsia. Its participants were exclusively men. The amateur actors performed on the stage of the city's public club and in local cinema halls.

In February 1904, participants at a meeting of the city representatives petitioned the Ministry of Internal Affairs of the Russian Empire for approval of the Charter of the Derbent Turkic (Azerbaijani) Drama Theatre. The charter was approved on 22 September 1904. The theatre's performers had no formal theatrical training. In 1910, the theatre staged the premiere of the opera Leyli and Majnun by Uzeyir Hajibeyov.

=== Soviet Union ===
In 1918, the theatre troupe disbanded as a result of the events of the Russian Civil War. Following the establishment of Soviet rule in 1920, the Azerbaijani Amateur Theatre was founded on the basis of the Proletarian Youth Club. In 1927, the theatre was granted professional status, and the troupe was assigned a renovated building formerly occupied by the Proletarian Youth Club. However, on the night before its opening, the building was destroyed by a fire, the cause of which could not be determined.

In 1931, the theatre opened in the newly constructed Builders' Club. The actor Ismayil Daghistanli was appointed chief director.

From 1933 to 1949, the theatre's director was Musaib Dzhum-Dzhum, a People's Artist of the Dagestan ASSR. In 1936, the theatre was granted the status of the State Azerbaijani Musical Drama Theatre. However, in 1949, it was closed due to insufficient funding, and the Interkolkhoz (inter-collective farm) Theatre was established in its place.

In 1967, the Azerbaijani People's Theatre was established at the House of Culture of Derbent District under the leadership of Nasir Gashim-ogly. On 27 April 1998, the theatre was granted state status. It was assigned the building of the Rodina Cinema, which proved unsuitable for use because of its deteriorated condition. As a result, the Azerbaijani Ttheatre performed at the facilities of the Lezgin Drama Theatre. Construction of a new theatre building was suspended in 2006.

=== Russia ===
In 2017, the Lezgin Drama Theatre hosted the premieres of the children's play Lev Vaska, based on a play by Pavel Ivanovich Morozov, and the comedy Everyone Has Their Own Star by Azerbaijani writer Isi Abbas oglu Melikzade.

In 2021, construction began on a new theatre building on the site of the former Rodina Cinema. The project was completed shortly thereafter. The theatre officially opened on 27 March 2026, on World Theatre Day.
