= Akhso Shalumova =

- Ахсо Шалумова
- Born: Akhso Ilyaguevna Shalumova; October 14, 1907; Derbent, Dagestan Oblast, Russian Empire
- Died: January 30, 1985 (aged 77); Derbent, Dagestan ASSR, Soviet Union
- Occupation: Stage actor
- Years active: 1924–1983

Akhso Ilyaguevna Shalumova (Russian: Ахсо Ильягуевна Шалумова; Hebrew: אחסו שלומוב; 1907–1985) was the first Soviet stage actress of the Judeo-Tat Theatre. For many years of creative work, in 1968, by Decree of the Presidium of the Supreme Council of the Dagestan ASSR, Akhso Shalumova was awarded the title of "Honored Artist of the Dagestan ASSR."

== Biography ==
Akhso Shalumova was born in 1907 in Derbent into a large family. She was the seventh of eight children.

Her older brother, Manashir, led the Judeo-Tat theater group alongside his wife, Khanum. Akhso often attended rehearsals, but another older brother, Zavolu, forbade her from participating in productions. At the time, Mountain Jewish customs dictated that women, especially young girls, should not perform on stage. However, Manashir took Akhso under his wing and allowed her to perform. She eventually moved in with him.

From the age of 15, Akhso Shalumova began performing on the stage of the Judeo-Tat theater. At 16, she married her cousin, Istokhor, who was also a performer in the theater.

Akhso Shalumova's first role was Nazly-Khanum in Odigyuzel (Judeo-Tat: Одигюзель). She later portrayed Gulchohre in Arshin Mal Alan an operetta by Azerbaijani composer Uzeyir Hajibeyov, Peri in Peri-Khanum (Judeo-Tat: Периханум), Khanum, the wife of Shevrut, in Kishdi Khomoli (Judeo-Tat: Кишди хьомоли), Shakhnugor in Shimi Derbendi (Judeo-Tat: Шими Дербенди), the mother-in-law in Khussur (Judeo-Tat: Хьуьсуьр), the role of Efrus in the play "Makhsum" (Judeo-Tat: Мэхьсуьм) by Yuno Semyonov. In the production of Namus (Judeo-Tat: Номус), based on the tragic novel by Alexander Shirvanzade, Akhso Shalumova played the role of Susanna. She also portrayed the mother in the play Quiet Ukrainian Night (Judeo-Tat: Сокоте шев Украине) and a mountain agronomist in Earth (Judeo-Tat: Хори), along with many other roles.

In 1926, Akhso Shalumova gave birth to a son, Mukhoil, followed by Boris in 1928. Despite having two young children, she traveled through villages, participating in all the theater's productions. In the play Peri-Khanum, her character had two children, and according to the script, Akhso's own sons played those roles alongside her on stage. Later, she gave birth to a daughter, Raisa.

Working in the theater was not always safe for Akhso Shalumova. On one occasion, while returning from a tour in the village of Mitagi, the actors were attacked by robbers who destroyed the stage scenery and beat the male members of the troupe. Akhso and her two young children, whom she had brought with her, were also targeted. Their lives were saved only by villagers returning from the city, who came to their rescue. The actors were often not paid in money; instead, their reward was sometimes food.

In 1932, when the Judeo-Tat sector of the National State Theatre was established, Akhso Shalumova was invited to join as an actress.

During the Great Patriotic War, theater actors went to the front. Akhso sang songs from theater productions for the wounded being treated in Derbent hospitals. Many actors lost their lives during the war.

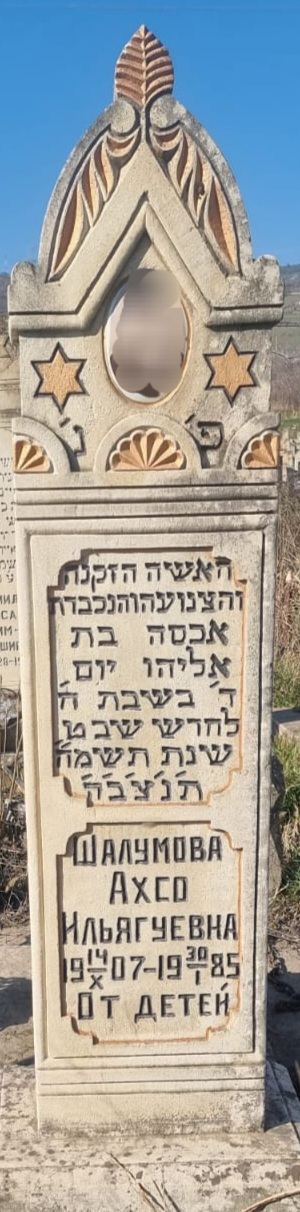
Grave of Akhso Shalumova, Derbent, Russia

After the war, Akhso Shalumova led the amateur art circle at the Lenin collective farm. This group later became the foundation for the revival of the Judeo-Tat theatre. She actively participated in public life, serving multiple times as a deputy of the city council and as a delegate to the Congress of Women of Dagestan.

In 1967, Akhso's eldest son, Mukhoil, passed away in Tashkent.

In 1983, Akhso Shalumova retired from her theatrical career. She died in 1985 in Derbent.

== Family ==
- Istokhor, husband
- Mukhoil (1926–1967), son
- Boris (1928-?), son
- Raisa, daughter
- Dana Peri, a great-granddaughter and poet.

== Awards ==
- Honored Artist of the Dagestan ASSR

== Literature ==
- Mikhailova, Irina (2014). Самородки Дагестана [Gifted of Dagestan] (in Russian). Makhachkala. Russia. pp. 28–31.

== See also ==
- Judeo-Tat Theatre
