= Lezgian Musical and Drama Theatre =

Theatre in Dagestan, Russia

Suleyman Stalsky State Lezgian Musical and Drama Theatre
- Лезгинский музыкально-драматический театр имени С. Стальского
- Interactive map of Suleyman Stalsky State Lezgian Musical and Drama Theatre
- Address: Derbent; Russia
- Coordinates: 42°03′15″N 48°17′41″E
- Owner: Russian Federation
- Capacity: 395

Construction
- Opened: 1905; 121 years ago

Website
- https://www.lezgi-teatr.ru/

Suleyman Stalsky State Lezgian Musical and Drama Theatre (Russian: Лезгинский музыкально-драматический театр имени С. Стальского) is a drama theatre in Derbent, Dagestan, Russia, specializes in staging plays centered on the lives of Lezgins. The performances are conducted in the Lezgian language.

== History ==
=== Early years ===
The Lezgian Theatre originated in the village of Akhty in 1905 as an amateur drama group founded by Idris Shamkhalov together with the amateur actors Gasan Kisriev, Khalil Guseynov, Babakhan Babakhanov, Ashurbek Ashuraliev, Malik Ganiyev, Magomed Efendiyev, and the brothers Magomedmirza and Gadzhimurad Eyubov.

The first performance was staged at the home of A. Ashuraliev and was presented exclusively to a male audience. The troupe subsequently decided to stage the performance for women as well; however, local Muslim clergy opposed the event, and the performance was disrupted. The administration of the Akhty Fortress later provided a venue for performances, and the drama group's first public performance was consequently held at the fortress.

One of the troupe's earliest productions was Burzhali (Russian: Буржали), a stage adaptation of Lezgian folklore. The play was a major success among the local population. According to the playbill, the production was directed by Idris Shamkhalov, while Nukh Askarov served as the stage designer. The audience included fortress officers, officials of the Samursky Okrug, soldiers, and residents of Akhty.

=== Akhty and Surakhany theatres ===
Members of the drama group were workers employed in the seasonal oil fields of Baku and other localities of Baku Governorate. The group's theatrical activities were subsequently continued in Surakhany, a suburb of Baku. Performances began to be staged regularly during the autumn and winter months.

The Surakhany theatre staged productions primarily in the Azerbaijani language and based on plays by Azerbaijani dramatists. Unlike the Akhty theatre, the Surakhany troupe was more diverse in composition. It included women as well as representatives from other Lezgian districts. As a result, the theatre operated in Akhty during the spring and summer and in Surakhany during the autumn and winter.

In Akhty, performances were held in an open-air venue and, during inclement weather, at Ashuraliev's house or in an old inn. In Surakhany, performances were staged at the "People's House" (the Sergo Ordzhonikidze House of Culture).

In the summer of 1908, the play Old Turkey (Russian: Старая Турция), dedicated to the Young Turk Revolution that brought the Young Turks to power in the Ottoman Empire, was staged in Akhty. However, the commandant of the Akhty Fortress prohibited the play from being performed. The authorities later permitted its staging in the village. Posters were distributed and tickets were sold, but the performance was interrupted by the police, who detained the director, Idris Shamkhalov, for ten days.

=== The theatre during the Soviet period and the present day ===
Following the establishment of Soviet rule, the activities of the Akhty drama group continued uninterrupted. In the spring of 1918, new plays and operas were staged.

In 1920, the theatre was placed under the authority of the Department of Public Education and became known as the Akhty Soviet Theatre. The theatre had its own administration, permanent troupe, seal, and official stamp. Performances were staged regularly in the open air and attracted large audiences. During the early years of Soviet rule, the theatre received considerable state support, which improved the material conditions of its performers.

In 1927, owing to the persistent support of Gadzhimet Safaraliyev, chairman of the executive committee of the Samursky Okrug, a theatre building with a 500-seat auditorium was constructed on the site of an old cemetery in the Kuzay quarter of Akhty. M. Efendiyev was appointed director of the Akhty Soviet Theatre, M. Ganiyev became artistic director, and I. Shamkhalov and S. Agabalayev served as stage directors. Many actors also worked as assistant directors.

In early 1935, the Dagestan Regional Committee of the All-Union Communist Party (Bolsheviks) and the government of the Dagestan ASSR resolved to establish a National Song and Dance Ensemble composed of the Avar, Lak, and Lezgian theatres and to elevate the status of the Akhty Soviet Theatre to that of the State Lezgian Drama Theatre, which continued to operate in the village of Akhty.

In 1935, the theatre was renamed the State Lezgian Drama Theatre. In 1938, it was named after the People's Poet of Dagestan, Suleyman Stalsky.

In 1949, the theatre was relocated to Derbent. In 1955, the troupe was joined by graduates of the Russian Institute of Theatre Arts (GITIS). The theatre participated in the Dagestan Decade of Literature and Art in Moscow in 1960.

From 1949 to 1967, the theatre's chief director was Musaib Dzhum-Dzhum, a People's Artist of the Dagestan ASSR.

Since 1988, the theatre's artistic director has been Esedullah Navruzbekov, a director, playwright, and theatre scholar. In 1998, he was awarded the "Golden Palm Prize" by the international association "Partnership for Progress" in Paris.

In 1997, the theatre received its current name, the Suleyman Stalsky State Lezgian Musical and Drama Theatre.

== Awards ==
- Honorary Diploma of the Presidium of the Supreme Soviet of the RSFSR (10 August 1960) — awarded in connection with the Dagestan Decade of Literature and Art in Moscow and for contributions to the development of Soviet art..
