= Sergey Izgiyayev =

Soviet writer and translator (1922–1972)

Sergey Davidovich Izgiyayev
- Сергей Давидович Изгияев
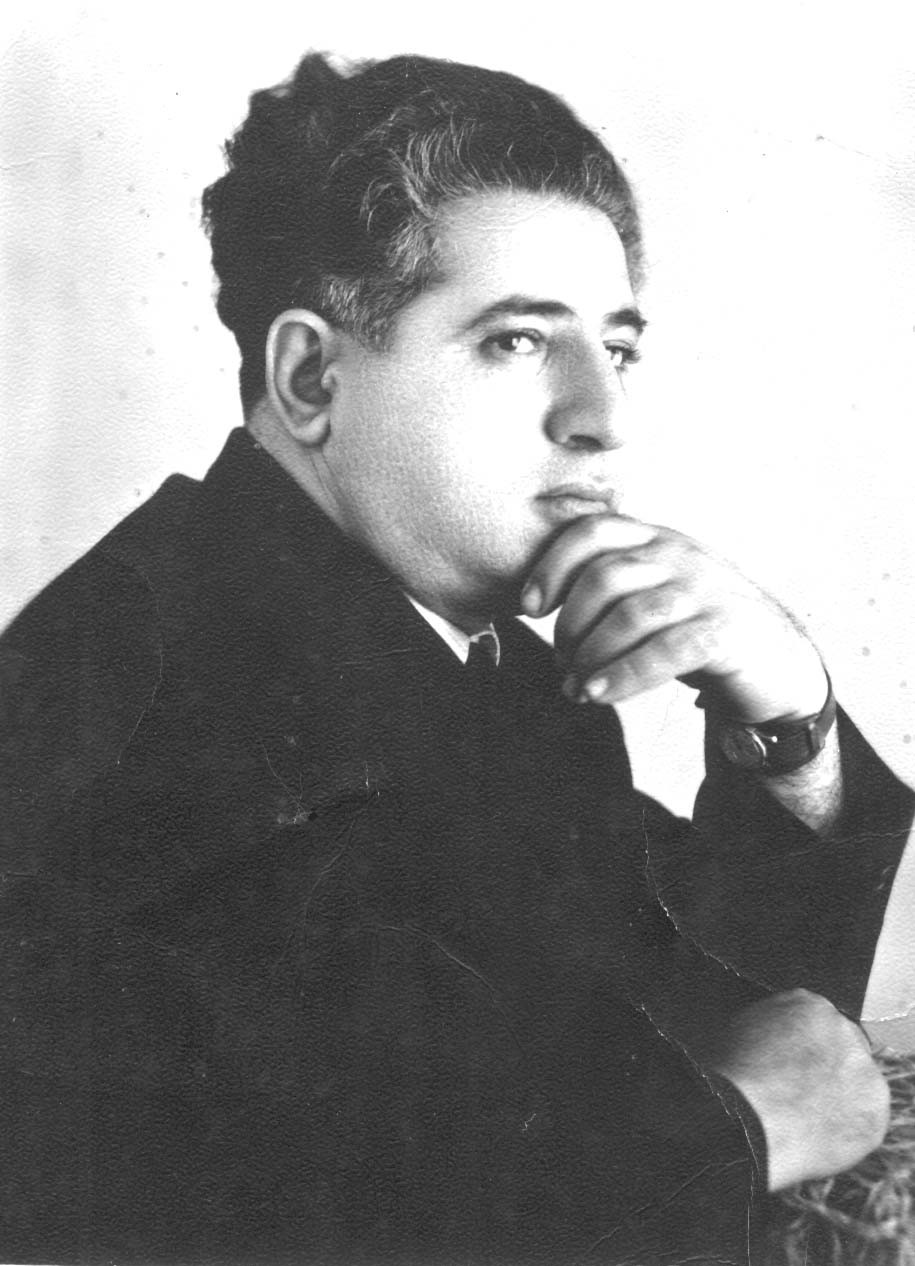
- Izgiyayev in 1970
- Born: 22 November 1922; Mushkur, Dagestani ASSR, Soviet Union
- Died: 27 July 1972 (aged 49); Derbent, Dagestani ASSR, Soviet Union
- Occupation: poet
- Writing career
- Notable awards: Medal "Twenty Years of Victory in the Great Patriotic War 1941–1945" (1965)

Sergey Davidovich Izgiyayev (Russian: Сергей Давидович Изгияев; Hebrew: סרגיי איזגיאייב; born 22 November 1922 – 27 July 1972) was a Soviet writer, translator, and songwriter. A member of the Soviet Union of Writers, Izgiyayev is the author of nine books of poetry and five plays, the translator and creator of lyrics for more than thirty songs (nine of which were produced by Moscow's firm Melodiya on Gramophone records). He was of Mountain Jew descent.

== Biography ==
Izgiyayev was born in Myushkyur, a village located south-east of the town of Derbent, modern-day Dagestan, on the river Gyul'gerychay. The village's modern name is Nyugdi. His parents, Dovid-Haim and Leah, had seven children, including three sons and four daughters. Izgiyayev was the only one of the parent's three sons to live to adulthood. His brother Hizgie, as a child, accidentally fell into a flamed tandoor oven, and burned to death. His other brother, Gadmil, died of typhoid fever in his early teens. His sisters Sariah, Mazaltu, Tirso, and Shushen survived to adulthood.

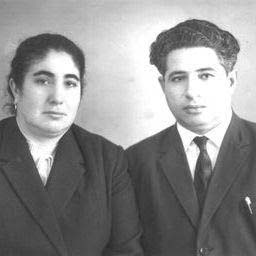
Sergey Izgiyayev with wife Sarah, c. 1968–1969

Sergey Izgiyayev started writing poems as a child. In 1939, the regional newspaper Red Star (in the language of the Mountain Jews) published a large collection of his poems. Later that year, he married Sarah Shamailov (1923–1978). Her contemporaries, men and women alike, thought that she was a beautiful woman. Izgiyayev dedicated many lyric poems to her.

From 1940 to 1946, Sergey Izgiyayev was in the military, where he continued to write and publish in the military press. After demobilization, Izgiyayev went to school and graduated from a pedagogical college while working at the local radio station. In 1947, Sergey Izgiyayev participated in the first congress for young writers in Soviet Dagestan. In the early 1960s, he earned his MA in education. From 1961, he served as the chairman of a collective farm (kolkhoz), and was the head of the department of culture of Derbent District Executive Committee, among other leadership positions. In 1963, Sergey Izgiyayev was accepted to the Union of Soviet Writers.

In addition to poetry, Sergey Izgiyayev wrote stage plays for the Judeo-Tat Theatre.

He translated poems and plays from Russian, Avar, Azerbaijani, and other languages into his native Mountain Jews' language, Juhuri. He also translated the libretto of Uzeyir Hajibeyov's opera Layla and Majnun, and poems by Mikhail Lermontov, Suleyman Stalsky, Gamzat Tsadasa, Rasul Gamzatov, and others. His second major work in translation involved High Stars (1968), a poem in Avar by Rasul Gamzatov, which is translated as "Bylynde astaeho" (Буьлуьнде астарегьо) in Juhuri. Izgiyayev's son David commented on this in an article:

"My father was friends with Rasul Gamzatov, who repeatedly visited my father at a party, but I particularly remember his visit with Murat Kazhlaev (Dagestani composer), to finalize the book to print…"

About thirty of Sergey Izgiyayev's poems became songs. David, his son, wrote:

"Daddy's songs, especially Gyulboor, are still sung by people in Russia, Israel, America, and Europe…"

Many Dagestani composers such as Baba Guliyev, Djumshud Ashurov, and Yuno Avshalumov wrote music based on poetry written by Sergey Izgiyayev.

Izgiyayev dedicated many poems to his wife Sarah, one of them was To the beloved that written by him while still the groom. The poem Daughter Sveta is dedicated to his youngest daughter.

Izgiyayev died on 27 July 1972 and was buried at the Jewish cemetery in Derbent.

== Family ==
The eldest son Rashi (1947–2009) died in Derbent. The other children Leah (Lisa), David, Ruspo (Rosa), Svetlana, and grandchildren live in Israel.

== Books ==
During Izgiyayev's lifetime, five book collections of his poems and plays were published. Those included:

- We are the defenders of the World (Иму гъэлхэнд шолуминим; 1952)
- Songs of Youth (МэгIнигьой жовони; 1959)

In 1959, along with many other poets, Sergey Izgiyayev published his poems in a literary anthology (Judeo-Tat: Сесгьой жовонгьо) – Voices of the Young.

- Poems (Стихигьо; 1963)
- Thoughts of the Poet (Фикиргьой шогьир; 1966)
- A conversation with the heart (Суьгьбет э дуьлевоз; 1970)

== Poems published posthumously ==
- The fate and love (Муьгьбет ве гьисмет; 1972)
- This is our custom (Э иму ижире гIэдоти; 1977)
- Poetry and Poem (Стихигьо ве поэма; 1981)
- Selected works (2002)

== Books exhibition ==
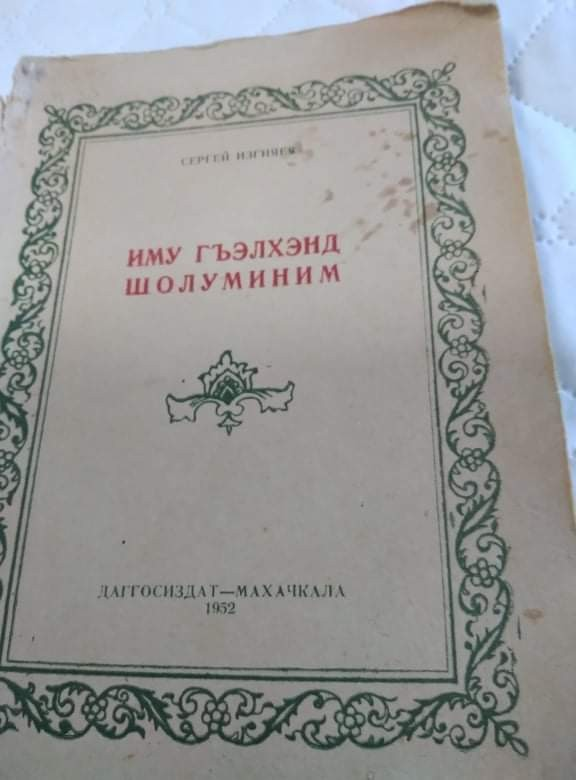
We are the defenders of the World (1952)

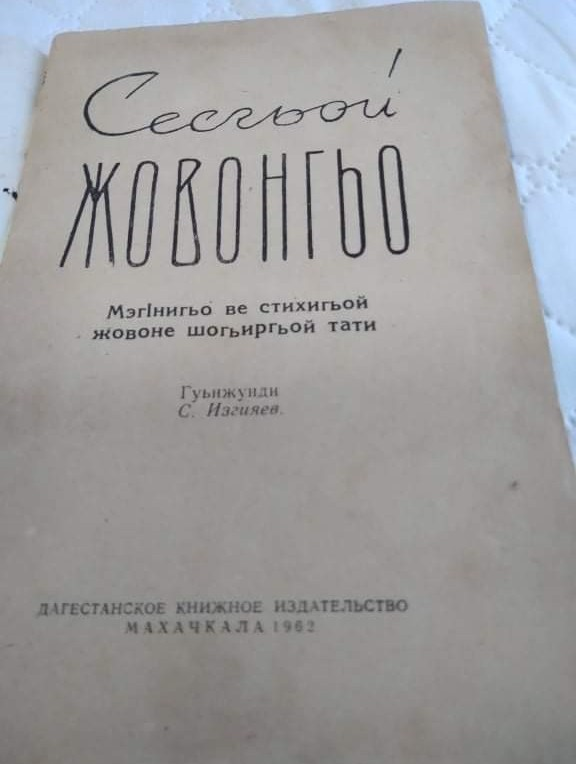
First page to We are the defenders of the World (1952)

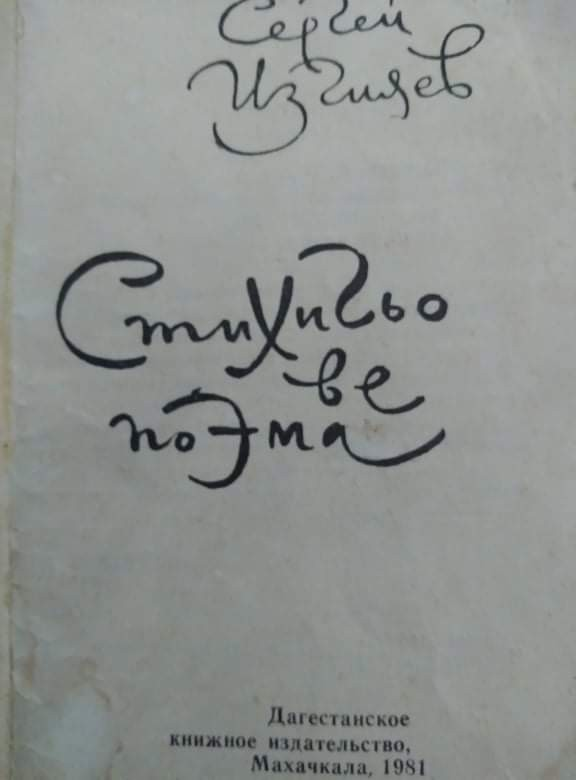
First page to Poetry and Poems (1981)
