= Musaib Dzhum-Dzhum =

- Мусаиб Джум-Джум; Musaib Cüm-Cum
- Born: Мусаиб Мамедалиевич Джум-Джум; 1905; Baku, Azerbaijan, Russian Empire
- Died: July 1974 (aged 69); Derbent, Dagestan ASSR, Russian SFSR
- Occupation: theatre director
- Years active: 1920–1970

Musaib Mamedalievich Dzhum-Dzhum (Azerbaijani: Musaib Məmmədalieviç Cüm-Cum; Russian: Мусаиб Мамедалиевич Джум-Джум; 1905 – July 1974) was a Soviet theatre director. He worked as a director in the Azerbaijani, Judeo-Tat and Lezgian theaters in Derbent, Dagestan ASSR. In 1945, Musaib Dzhum-Dzhum was awarded the title of "Honored Artist of the Dagestan ASSR". In 1960, he received the title of "People's Artist of the Dagestan ASSR". He had many government awards and honorary certificates.

== Biography ==
Musaib Dzhum-Dzhum was born in 1905 in Baku into the family of a handicraftsman. After his mother's death, he was left in the care of an Armenian neighbor, who raised and educated him.

After the establishment of Soviet rule in Azerbaijan, Musaib Dzhum-Dzhum enrolled in school, where his stage career began.

From 1920 to 1928, while continuing his studies, he worked at the Theater of Working Youth (TRAM).

Between 1928 and 1933, he worked at the State Azerbaijani Theater in Tbilisi, where he also studied at a theater studio.

From 1933 to 1949, he served as a theater director for the Azerbaijani and Judeo-Tat theaters in Derbent, later becoming the chief director. After these theaters were abolished, Musaib Dzhum-Dzhum moved to the State Lezgin Drama Theater named after Suleyman Stalsky, where he worked as a director until October 1967. From 1960 to 1964, he also served as the chief director of the newly established inter-collective farm Judeo-Tat Theatre.

From October 1967 until his retirement, he worked as a director at the Judeo-Tat People’s Theater. Musaib Dzhum-Dzhum was actively involved in cultural and patronage work for the armed forces of the USSR, particularly during the Great Patriotic War. He organized special brigades to provide cultural services to soldiers and conscripts in military units, recruiting stations, hospitals, and defensive lines, staging a total of 810 concerts and performances.

Throughout his stage career, Musaib Dzhum-Dzhum directed 140 productions.

Musaib Dzhum-Dzhum was multilingual in several languages: Azerbaijani, Mountain Jewish, Armenian, Lezgin.

Musaib Dzhum-Dzhum died in July 1974 in Derbent.

== Awards ==
- 1945, "Honored Artist of the Dagestan ASSR"
- 1960, "People's Artist of the Dagestan ASSR"

== Literature ==
- Mikhailova, Irina (2014). Самородки Дагестана [Gifted of Dagestan] (in Russian). Makhachkala. Russia. pp. 22–23.
