= Mitagi-Kazmalyar =

Mitagi-Kazmalyar Митаги-Казмаляр Митәhи-Газмалар
- Selo
- Location within Republic of Dagestan Location within Russia
- Coordinates: 42°02′N 48°12′E
- Country: Russia
- Region: Republic of Dagestan
- District: Derbentsky District
- Time zone: UTC+3:00

Mitagi-Kazmalyar (Russian: Митаги-Казмаляр; Azerbaijani: Митәhи-Газмалар, Mitəhi-Qazmalar) is a rural locality (a selo) in Derbentsky District, Republic of Dagestan, Russia. The population was 1,176 as of 2010. There are 49 streets.

== Geography ==
Mitagi-Kazmalyar is located 16 km west of Derbent (the district's administrative centre) by road. Mitagi and Mugarty are the nearest rural localities.

== Nationalities ==
Azerbaijanis live there.
