= Shatiel Abramov =

Soviet lieutenant colonel (1918–2004)

Shatiel Semyonovich Abramov
- Шетиель Семёнович Абрамов
- Abramov in the 1950s
- Born: 11 November 1918; Derbent, Dagestan ASSR, RSFSR
- Died: 14 May 2004 (aged 85); Moscow, Russia
- Military career
- Allegiance: Soviet Union
- Branch: Red Army
- Service years: 1941–1946
- Rank: Lieutenant Colonel
- Conflicts: World War II
- Awards: Hero of the Soviet Union

Shatiel Semyonovich Abramov (Russian: Шетиель Семёнович Абрамов; 11 November 1918 – 14 May 2004) was a Soviet battalion commander in the Red Army during World War II. He was awarded the title Hero of the Soviet Union.

== Military career ==
After completing training in an infantry school in 1940, he was drafted into the Soviet Army fighting in World War II. He was wounded six times during the war and awarded several military decorations and medals. Abramov was awarded the title of Hero of the Soviet Union for action in Poland after the death of his battalion commander whilst in combat. According to his citation, Abramov took command of the battalion during the fight for a fortress in Poznań, scaling a wall to gain entry, and leading the way to the conquest of the fortress by his battalion. Other activity attributed to him during the war includes walking from Stalingrad to Berlin, and commanding a battalion which killed 400 Germans and captured another 1500.

== Postwar ==
After the war, he graduated from the Geological Prospecting Faculty of the Grozny Petroleum Institute in 1949 with a degree in Geology and mineralogy, and then worked as senior laboratory assistant in the Grozny Oil Institute from 1949 until 1952. In 1952, he moved to study for a master's degree at the All-Union Geological Institute (Russian: Всесоюзний геологический институт) in Leningrad, returning to the Grozny Petroleum Institute in 1956 as Dean of the Evening Faculty. In 1976, he was appointed as the Dean of the Faculty of Geological Exploration (декан геологического-разведочного факультета).

Abramov was the author of 10 scientific works, including one monograph. Abramov died in Moscow on 14 May 2004.

== Awards and honors ==
- Hero of the Soviet Union
- Order of Lenin
- Order of the Red Banner
- Order of the Red Star
- Honored Scientist of Chechen-Ingush ASSR
- Honorary Youth Mentor CHIASSR
- Honorary Oilman of the USSR
