= Judeo-Tat Theatre =

Lev Manakhimov Municipal Judeo-Tat Theatre
- Муниципальный горско-еврейский театр имени Льва Манахимова
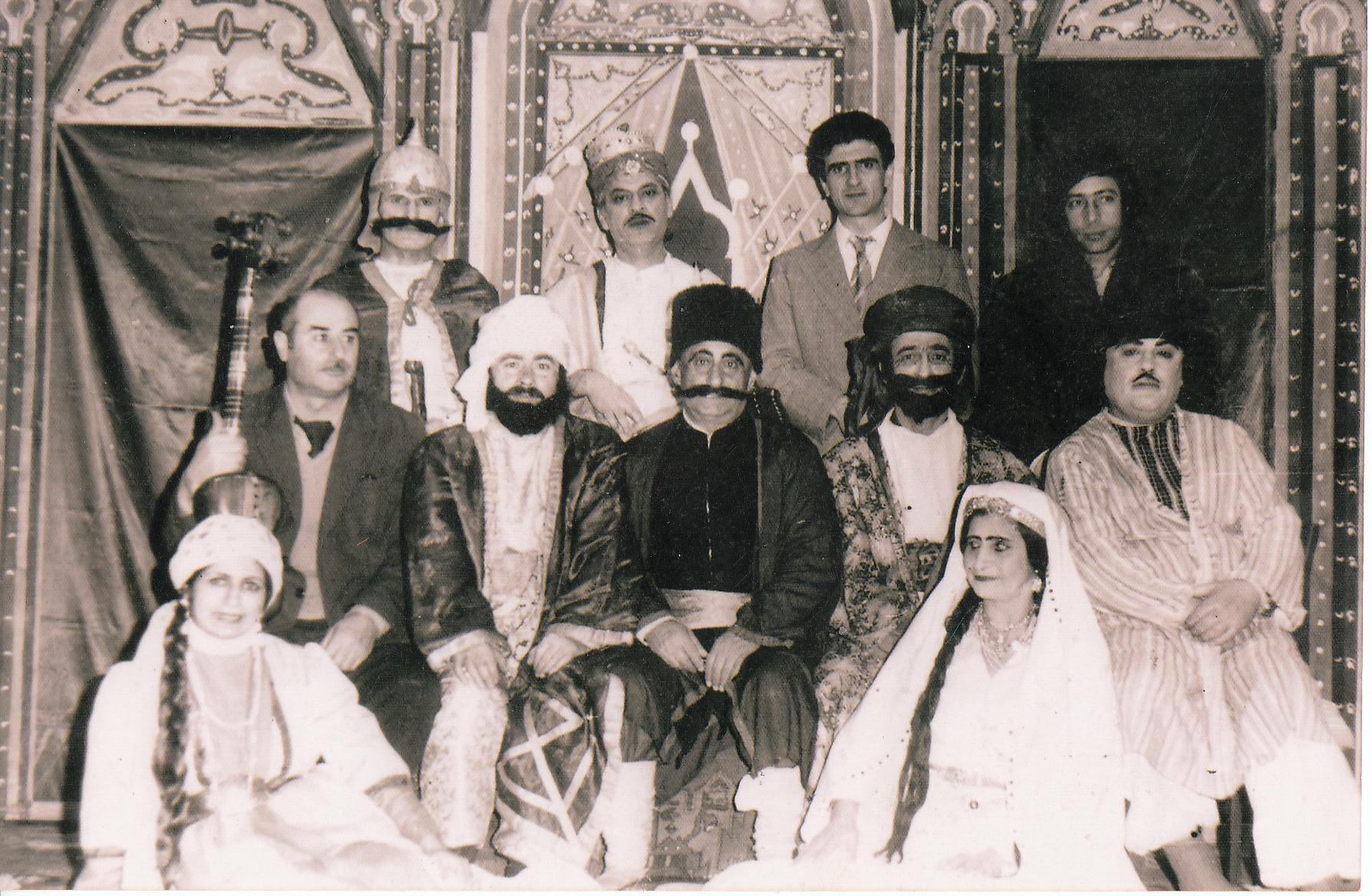
- Acting troupe in the play Ashig Garib. Derbent, USSR. 1984. First row – from left to right: Katya, Bikel Matatova. Second row – from left to right: musician Israel Izrailov, Roman Izyaev, Avshalum Nakhshunov, Raziil Ilyaguev, Abram Avdalimov. Third row – from left to right: Ilizir Abramov, Anatoly Yusupov, Israel Tsvaygenbaum.
- Address: Derbent; Russia

Construction
- Opened: 1903

The Judeo-Tat Theatre, also known as Lev Manakhimov Municipal Judeo-Tat Theatre in Derbent, Dagestan, Russia, specializes in staging plays centered on the lives of Mountain Jews, primarily created by members of the community. The performances are conducted in the Judeo-Tat language (Juhuri).

== History ==
=== Theatre in the Russian Empire ===
Traditionally, the Judeo-Tat Theatre created and performed works in Derbent, where most of the Mountain Jews lived. The first theatrical event by Mountain Jews took place in December 1903 when Asaf Agarunov, a teacher and Zionist, staged a play based on a story by Naum Shoykovich, translated from Hebrew, titled "The Burn for Burn". The performance was held in honor of schoolteacher Nagdimuna ben Simona (Shimunov)’s wedding.

=== Theatre in the Soviet Union ===
==== Derbent (Dagestan) ====
In 1918, a drama studio was established in Derbent under the leadership of Rabbi Yashayo Rabinovich. Since 1924, the Mountain Jewish group became known as the Cultural and Educational Circle of Mountain Jewish Youth, commonly referred to as the "GEM Circle" (Russian: Кружок ГЕМ). It was led by Yuno Semyonov (1899–1961) and Manashir Shalumov.

In 1924, Yuno Semyonov staged two plays in the Derbent Mountain Jewish circle: "Two Leather Sellers" and A "Cunning Matchmaker."

In 1935, the first Soviet theatre in Derbent was established, comprising three troupes—Russian, Judeo-Tat, and Azerbaijani. It originated from drama circles led by Manashir and Khanum Shalumov. Initially, men played female roles, but over time, women began to participate in the theatre.

This marked the beginning of a prosperous period, with numerous performances being staged. In 1939, the Judeo-Tat Theatre won the Festival of Theatres in Dagestan. The music for its productions was composed by the theatre’s composer and musical director, Djumshud Ashurov (1913–1980), an "Honored Artist of Dagestan."

At the beginning of 1941, the theatre was rehearsing "The Rift" by Boris Lavrenyov and "Aydin" by Jafar Jabbarly.

==== Gyrmyzy Gasaba (Azerbaijan) ====
From 1920 to 1932, the Judeo-Tat drama group was active in the Mountain Jews settlement of Gyrmyzy Gasaba in Azerbaijan.

==== Khasavyurt (Dagestan) ====
In the early 1930s, Alexandra Nikolaevna Shubaeva, mother of the writer Amaldan Kukullu, founded a Judeo-Tat drama group in the city of Khasavyurt. It is unknown how long the group lasted.

==== Theatre during World War II ====
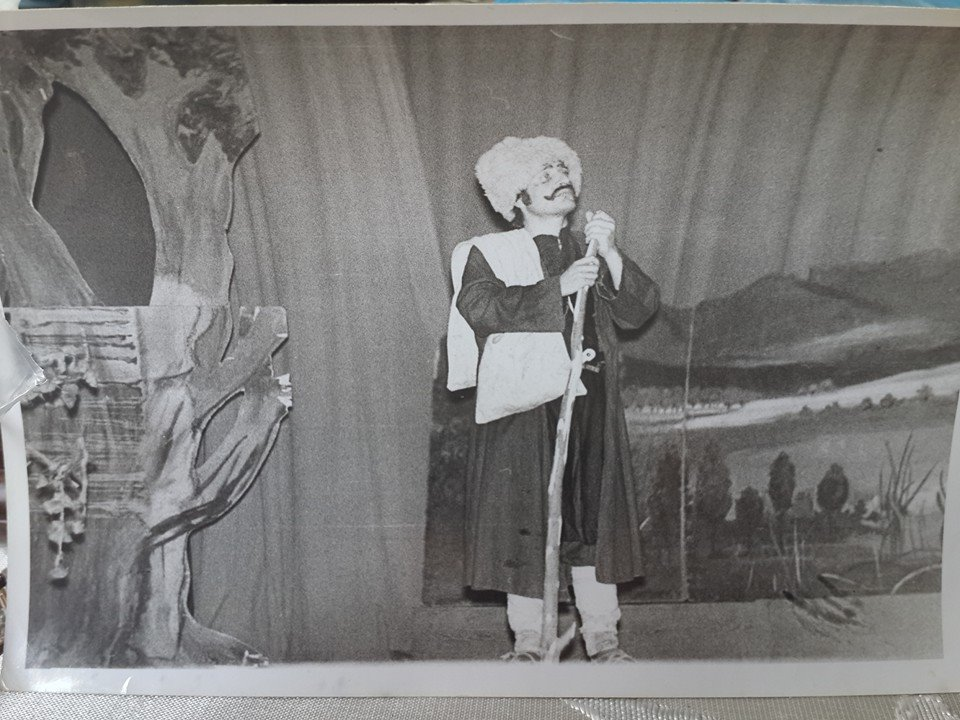
Actor Ilizir (Ilyusha) Abramov. Judeo-Tat theatre. Derbent, USSR. 1980.

During World War II, most of the theatre's actors were drafted into the army, and many lost their lives in the war. In 1943, the theatre resumed its work, but it was closed in 1948, officially due to unprofitability.

==== Post-war period ====
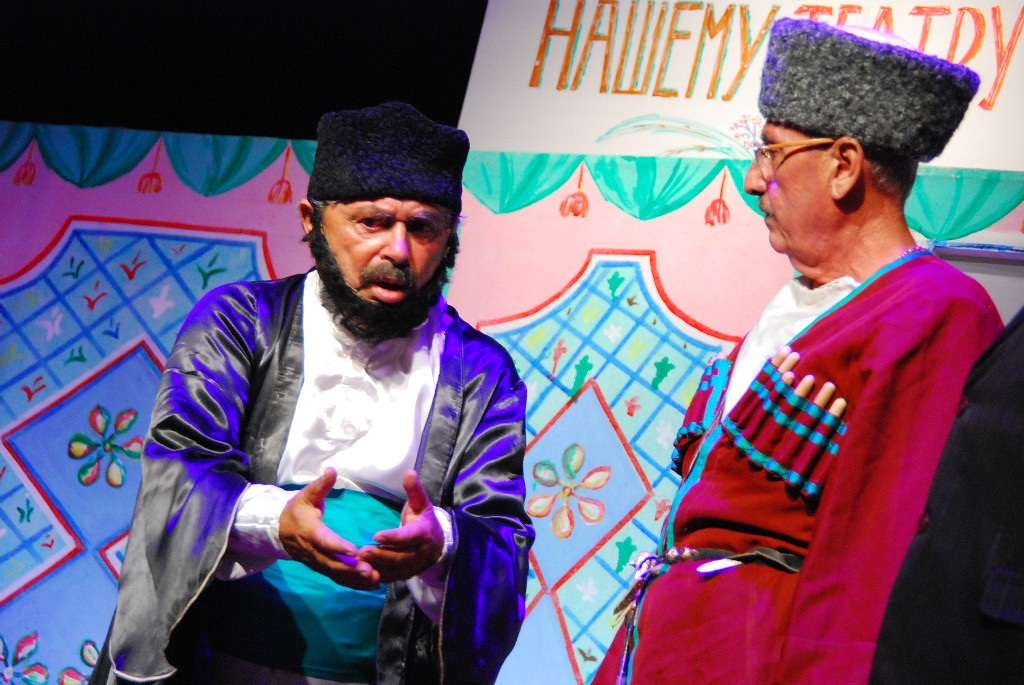
Actors of the Judeo-Tat's theatre "Rambam": Roman Izyaev & Rambam Mishiev. Israel. 2011.

On April 28, 1959, the board of the Stalin collective farm appealed to the city's party committee, requesting the creation of a Mountain Jewish People's Theatre as an amateur arts circle.

Pyotr Rafailovich Agarunov (1930–2006), an Excellent Worker of the USSR State Television and Radio Broadcasting, was invited from Baku to help organize the theatre's development. Musaib Dzhum-Dzhum (1905–1974), of Azerbaijani descent, was appointed as the theatre director and was honored with the title People's Artist of the Dagestan ASSR. He was highly knowledgeable about the language and culture of the Mountain Jews. The composer Djumshud Ashurov was named music director, while Mikhail Gavrilov (1926–2014), an Honored Worker of Culture of the Republic of Dagestan, served as the administrator.

In the 1960s, the theatre resumed its activities and experienced a second heyday. The beloved actress Akhso Shalumova (1907–1985), an Honored Artist of the Dagestan ASSR, returned to the stage. She played the role of Shahnugor, the wife of Shimi Derbendi (Judeo-Tat: «Шими Дербенди»), based on the stories of writer Hizgil Avshalumov.

In the 1970s, the People's Judeo-Tat Theatre was officially established. For many years, it was led by Abram Avdalimov (1929–2004), an Honored Cultural Worker of the Dagestan ASSR, as well as a singer, actor, and playwright. His successor was Roman Izyaev (1940–2018), who was awarded the Order of the Badge of Honour for his distinguished service.

==== Theatre in Russia ====
In the 1990s, the Judeo-Tat Theatre faced another crisis, with performances becoming rare and no new premieres being staged. It was only in 2000, after becoming a municipal theatre, that it was able to resume its activities.

From 2000 to 2002, the theatre was led by actor and musician Raziil Ilyaguev (1944–2016), an Honored Worker of Culture of the Republic of Dagestan. For the next two years, Alesya Natanovna Isakova served as the theatre’s director.

In 2004, Lev Manakhimov (1950–2021), an Honored Artist of the Republic of Dagestan, became the artistic director. In 2021, after his death, the Derbent Theatre was renamed the Municipal Judeo-Tat Theatre named after Lev Yakovlevich Manakhimov. Boris Yudaev took over as the theatre's head.

Throughout the theatre’s history, actors who have taken its stage include Bikel Matatova (1928–2013), an Honored Worker of Culture of the Dagestan ASSR; Avshalum Yakubovich Nakhshunov (Shori-Artist) (1925–1997), Mozol Izrailova, an Honored Worker of Culture of the Republic of Dagestan; as well as Anatoly Yusupov, Raya Novakhova, Israel Tsvaygenbaum, and Eva Shalver-Abramova.

== Theatre in Israel ==
In 2001, artistic director, actor, screenwriter, and set designer Roman Izyaev founded the Mountain Jews' theatre Rambam in the Israeli city of Hadera. The troupe has toured not only in cities with Mountain Jewish communities in Israel but also in Canada, the United States, Azerbaijan, and Moscow, Russia.

After the death of Roman Izyaev in 2018, Eva Shalver-Abramova became the chief director of the Rambam theatre.

In 2019, the Hadera Municipality withdrew its financial support for the Judeo-Tat Theatre. Thanks to the determination and donations of the actors themselves, the theatre was able to continue operating and staging performances until 2022. After that, it ceased to exist in Israel.

== Notable people ==
- Djumshud Ashurov (1913–1980), a composer and musical director
- Abram Avdalimov (1929–2004), a stage actor and artistic director
- Musaib Dzhum-Dzhum (1905–1974), an artistic director
- Mikhail Gavrilov (1926–2014), theatre director
- Raziil Ilyaguev (1944–1916), a stage actor and artistic director
- Mozol Izrailova, a stage actress
- Roman Izyaev (1940–2018), a stage actor and artistic director
- Lev Manakhimov (1950–2021), an artistic director
- Bikel Matatova (1928–2013), a stage actress
- Yuno Semyonov (1899–1961), an artistic director
- Akhso Shalumova (1907–1985), a stage actress
- Israel Tsvaygenbaum, an artist and actor

== See also ==
- Media related to Judeo-Tat theatre at Wikimedia Commons
- Горско-еврейский театр Дербента поставил спектакль о «лихих 90-х»
- Mezuzah was installed in the premises of the Judeo-Tat theatre in Hadera
- The world's only Judeo-Tat theatre from Israel performed for the first time in Russia
- Mountain Jews take the stage
- Judeo-Tat (Mountain Jewish) Theatre
- The world's only Judeo-Tat theatre will perform in Moscow for the first time
