= Derbent Music College =

Russian secondary music college

Djumshud Ashurov Derbent Music College
- Дербентское музыкальное училище имени Джумшуда Ашурова
- Former name: Derbent Music School
- Type: Secondary vocational educational institution
- Established: 15 June 1972; 54 years ago
- Location: Derbent, Russia; 42°03′26″N 48°17′41″E
- Campus: urban
- Language: Russian
- Website: www.dmu05.ru

Djumshud Ashurov Derbent Music College (Russian: Дербентское музыкальное училище имени Джумшуда Ашурова) is a music college located in the city of Derbent, Republic of Dagestan, Russia.

== History ==
By order of the Ministry of Culture of the USSR No. 309-B-kh, dated 15 June 1972, the Second Republican Music College was established with departments of piano, choral conducting, folk instruments, wind instruments, and string instruments. A graduate of the Saratov Conservatory, Alexander Petrovich Annenko, was appointed the college's first director. A building at 50 Lenin Street was allocated to house the institution.

To organize the educational process, the director recruited young specialists who had graduated from leading higher music education institutions, including G. I. Ovsyannikova and A. I. Berger (Leningrad Conservatory); L. A. Seroklinova (Novosibirsk Conservatory); S. D. Yunker and G. A. Polstyanoy (Saratov Conservatory); A. A. Storchevoy, T. M. Shcherbakova, P. S. Levi, and Yu. N. Oksisenko (Astrakhan Conservatory); V. P. Fedotov, L. I. Fedotova, and D. A. Osipov (Gorky Conservatory); and V. N. Shiyan (Kharkiv Conservatory), among many others. The first admissions campaign took place in August 1972, when 62 students were admitted.

In June 1976, the college celebrated the graduation of its first class, consisting of 50 students. The graduates were appointed as teachers at music schools in the city of Derbent and in the districts of Southern Dagestan, where there was an acute shortage of professionally trained music educators.

Over the years, the college's graduates have pursued careers in music schools, theatres, music colleges, and higher music and teacher-training institutions both within the Republic of Dagestan and elsewhere.

The college's students have won prizes, diplomas, and awards at republican and all-Russian festivals and competitions. The faculty and students actively participate in the concert life of the city and the republic, presenting lectures and concerts while gaining experience in ensemble performance and refining their performance skills.

On 19 May 2018, the Derbent Music College was named in honour of the composer Djumshud Ashurov.

== Notable alumni ==
- Madina Abdullayeva – instructor at the Derbent Music College; Honoured Worker of Culture of the Republic of Dagestan; and laureate of an international competition
- Avetis Abramyan – artistic director of the Kamchatka Border Guard Song and Dance Ensemble of the Border Directorate of the Federal Security Service of Russia for the Eastern Arctic Region
- Mirza Askerov – Honoured Worker of Culture of the Russian Federation; Honoured Figure of the All-Russian Music Society; Candidate of Pedagogical Sciences; Associate Professor; and artistic director and conductor of the Lomonosov Moscow State University Academic Choir, a people's ensemble that has won all-Russian and international competitions and festivals
- Isamutdin Akhmedov – Honoured Worker of Culture of the Republic of Dagestan and editor of Lezgian language music programmes for Dagestan Radio
- Anzhela Gasratova – senior lecturer in the Department of Special Piano at the Astrakhan State Conservatory
- Roza Chechenova (Kuchukova) — head of the Department of Choral Conducting at the North Caucasus State Institute of Arts in Nalchik; Associate Professor; and Honoured Worker of Culture of the Kabardino-Balkarian Republic
- Gasan Mirzoyev – rector of the Derbent Institute of Arts and Culture; Honoured Worker of Education of the Republic of Dagestan; and Honoured Worker of Culture of the Russian Federation
- Igor Semenduyev – member of the Nizhny Novgorod Philharmonic Symphony Orchestra
- Yakov Semenduev – Awarded the Grand Prix at the Jerusalem in My Heart competition in 2022 and received an internationally recognized diploma, as well as two certificates granting participation in international festivals in Estonia and Poland. On February 15, 2022, he won First Place at the international online festival Tallinn Gold Mix.
- Novruz Shahbazov – People's Artist of the Republic of Dagestan, Honoured Artist of the Republic of Dagestan, and artistic director and chief conductor of the State Orchestra of Folk Instruments of the Republic of Dagestan
