= Israel Tsvaygenbaum =

Russian and American painter

- Исраил Цвайгенбаум ישראל צווייגנבאום
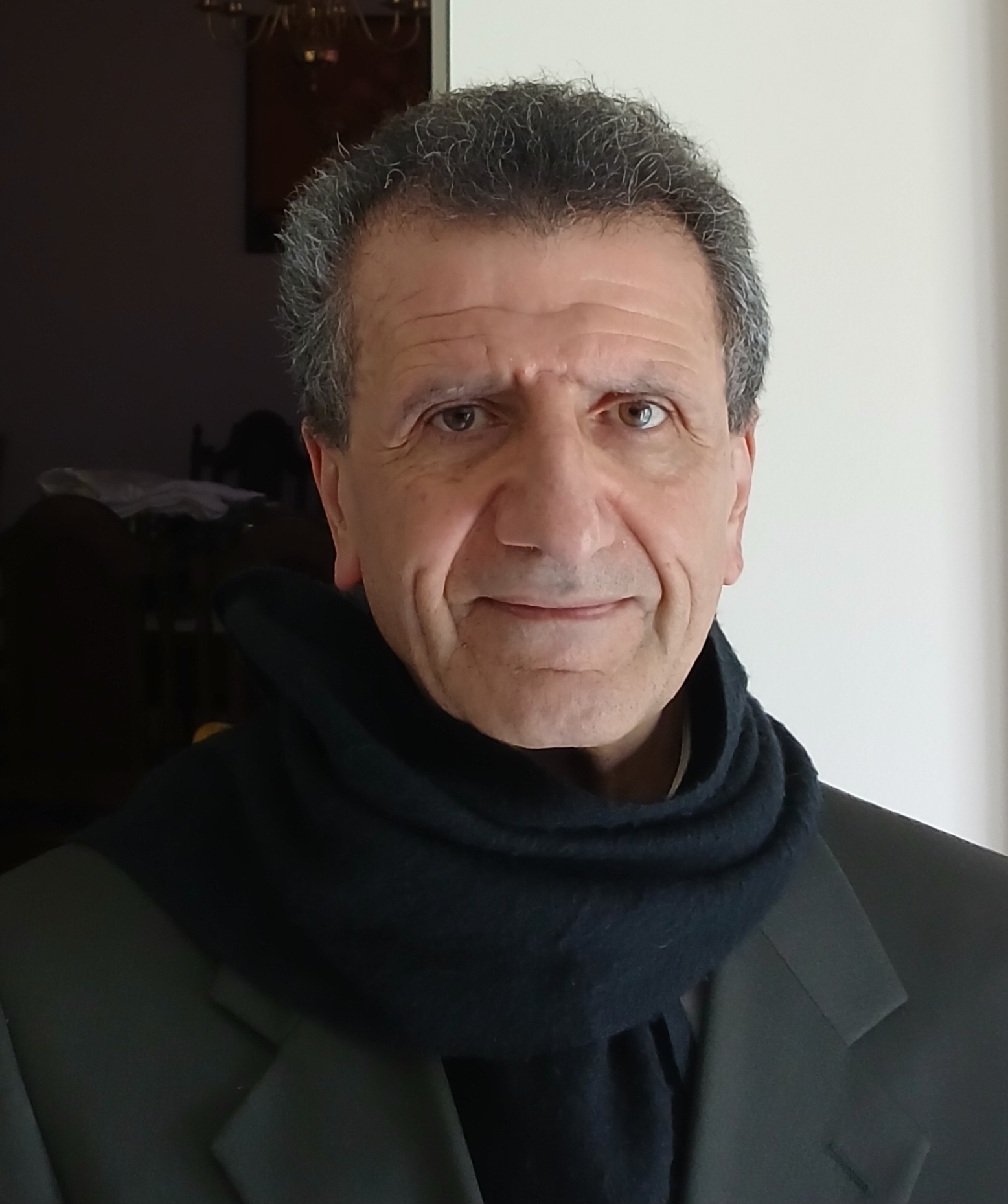
- Tsvaygenbaum in 2025
- Born: Israel Iosifovich Tsvaygenbaum; February 1, 1961 (age 65); Derbent, Dagestan ASSR, Russian SFSR, Soviet Union
- Citizenship: Russia; United States
- Known for: Painting, author
- Website: www.israelartgod.com

Israel Iosifovich Tsvaygenbaum (Russian: Исраил Иосифович Цвайгенбаум; Hebrew: ישראל צווייגנבאום; born February 1, 1961) is a Russian and American artist of Jewish descent. A number of his works are in the Historical, Architectural and Art Museum-Reserve, Derbent.

== Biography ==
Tsvaygenbaum was born in the Southern Russian city of Derbent, one of the oldest cities in the world. The population is predominantly Muslim, but there are also Jewish families residing there. Tsvaygenbaum's parents are Jewish. His father, from Bedzin, Poland, escaped to the Soviet Union during World War II. Tsvaygenbaum's mother was a Mountain Jew from Dagestan, Russia.

The culture and dynamic of the life of the area where Tsvaygenbaum grew up and his Jewish background are reflected in his paintings. The Russian newspaper Derbentskie izvestiya (Russian: Дербентские известия) once wrote about Tsvaygenbaum's work:

The theme of loneliness and melancholy is prevalent in many of the paintings, such as Nostalgia, Lonely, The Nailed Men, and others. This theme is inspired by images from the artist's father, who is from Poland. In 1939, at the age of 29, he fled Poland to escape the brown plague [Nazis]. His other relatives were killed. The composition of the pictures reveals sadness and melancholy.

Another paragraph in the newspaper says:

The palette of the colors in the paintings is moderate and muffled. This is a palette of autumn, in which the gold of the birch harmonizes with the copper of the oak tree's leaves. The crimson of the maple tree harmonizes with the darkness of bare branches.

From 1976 to 1980 Tsvaygenbaum studied art at Izberbash College, Izberbash, Dagestan. In 1991, he completed his master's in fine arts at Kuban State University, Krasnodar. Tsvaygenbaum organized Coloring, an association of artists, in Derbent in 1986. Coloring had art shows in Derbent and in the Art Gallery in Makhachkala, Dagestan, Russia.

From 1983 to 1985 Tsvaygenbaum pursued his love for acting by playing at amateur Judeo-Tat theatre in his hometown of Derbent. During these times, he painted portraits of two actors, Bikel Matatova (1928–2013) and Roman Izyaev (1940–2018).

In November 1993 and April 1994 Tsvaygenbaum had his last two shows in Russia. Both shows were two solo exhibitions held in Moscow, the first at East Gallery and the second, JEWISH RHAPSODY, at The Central House of Artists on Krymsky Val. The artist dedicated JEWISH RHAPSODY to his father.

In July 1994, Tsvaygenbaum and his family left Russia because it had become very dangerous for his family to continue to live in the republic of Dagestan. Currently, he is a resident of Albany, New York. In the USA Tsvaygenbaum has continued to work with oil on canvas. His paintings continue to portray both universal and Jewish themes, but noticeably, his palette has shifted from browns to yellows.

On December 25, 2016, in Europe and in Israel and on January 15, 2017, in the USA, RTVi broadcast an interview with Tsvaygenbaum in the program In New York with Victor Topaller, where the artist talked about his artwork, life and interesting people that he encountered in his life.

In 2016 Tsvaygenbaum was a guest author of the book "There was such a city. Derbent." The book was published in Russian. He included short stories from his childhood days in his hometown Derbent.

In 2018 Tsvaygenbaum was the guest author of another book "Proud, Happy, and Thankful to be Jewish." It was published in USA in English. His short stories in the book were labeled "Memoir: The Judaism in My Life."

In 2023 Tsvaygenbaum published in USA in English his memoir "My Secret Memory." The artist's memoir is based on his memories and experiences that inspired some of his works of art. It gives the reader a window into the artist's life and the lives of those who were important to Tsvaygenbaum and impactful in his life. The book features 35 images of the artist's paintings.

== Cooperation with other artist ==
People of Derbent (1999)

In 2001, in Albany, NY, Tsvaygenbaum began collaborating with dancer Judy Trupin. Trupin created dance compositions based on nine of Tsvaygenbaum's paintings. These were the foundation for the show Worlds in Our Eyes. In 2002, the newspaper The Record wrote:

Tsvaygenbaum's paintings and Trupin's performance are intended to reflect memories of Jewish life in Eastern Europe and Russia while touching on universal themes. ... Tsvaygenbaum is dedicated Worlds in Our Eyes to the people of his home city, Derbent. His painting, People of Derbent, is one of the nine paintings Trupin draws from.

The newspaper Daily Gazette wrote:

Using a blend of dance, original stories, world music and slides, Trupin ... interpret nine of Tsvaygenbaum's paintings.

Worlds in Our Eyes had been performed in several cities of New York State.

== Awards ==
- 2013. Media 3. Art Biennial. Diploma of Excellence. Art Addiction Medial Museum. London.

== Gallery ==
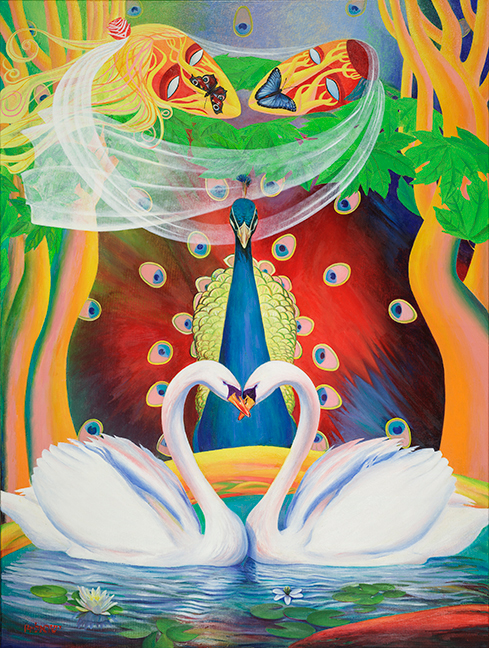
Wrapped in Love (2014)

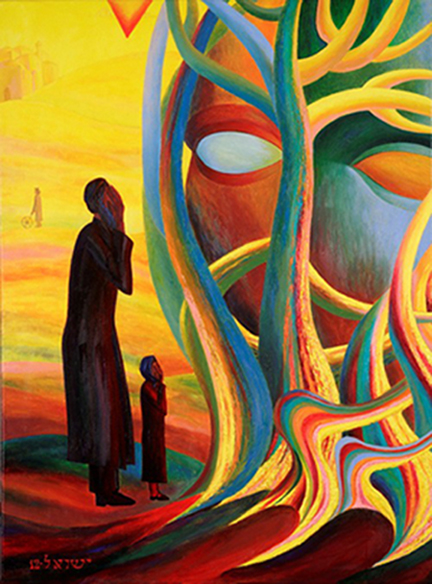
Prayers at the Tree of Life (2012)

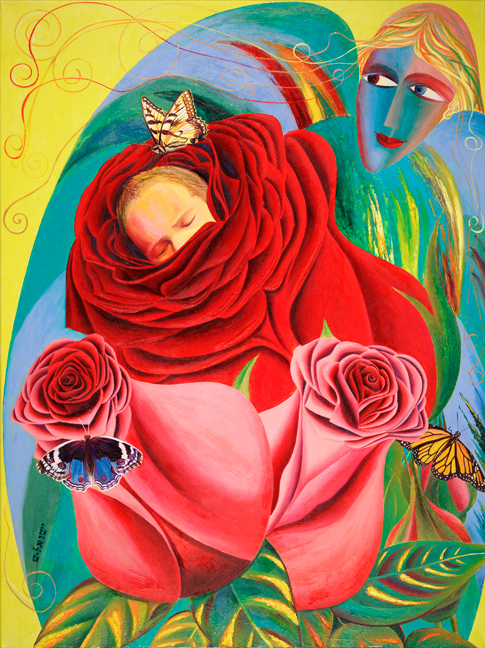
The Angel of Roses (2012)

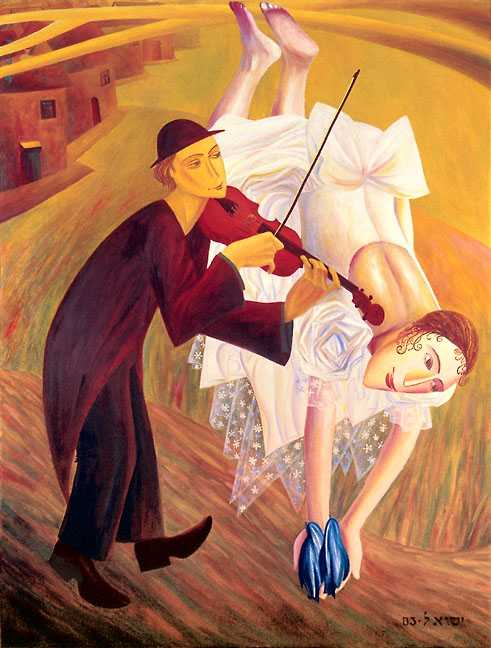
Conjured Melodies (2003)

Roses (2002)

The Golden Jar (2001)

Abraham And Isaac (2001)

Duet (2000)

The Way - Aliyah (1997)

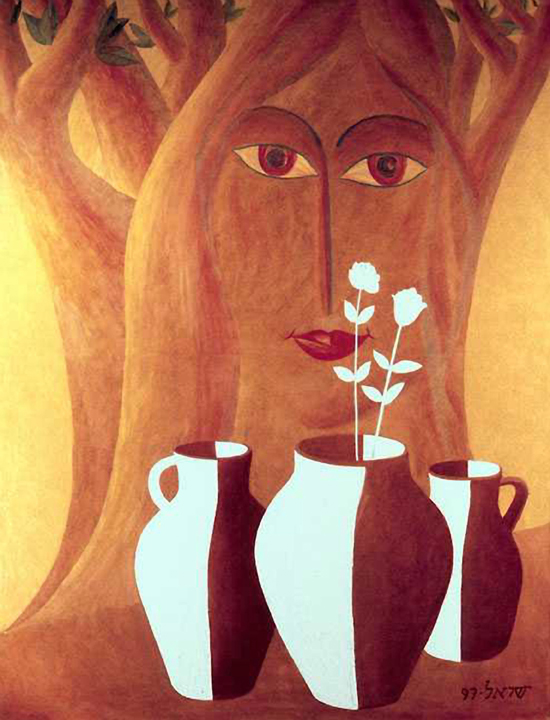
Two Lives (1997)

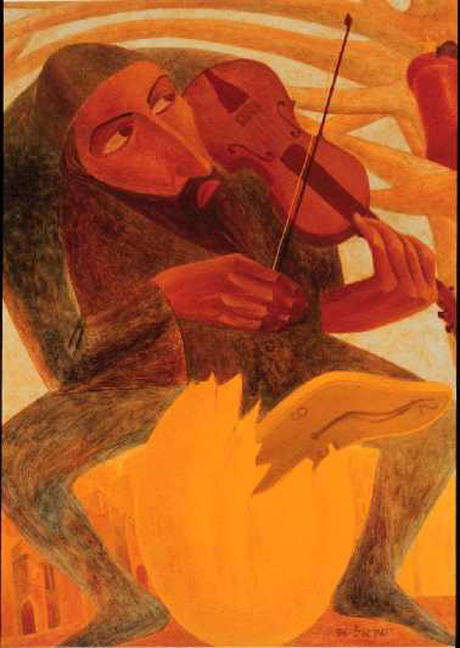
The Man and Mouse (1997)

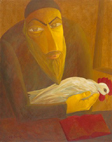
The Shochet with Rooster (1997)

A Bride I (1997)

Boy Leading The Blind Angel (1997)

A Bride (1993)

The Blind Men (1992)

The Penance Dance (1992)

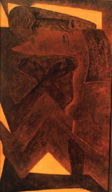
The Nailed Men (1991)

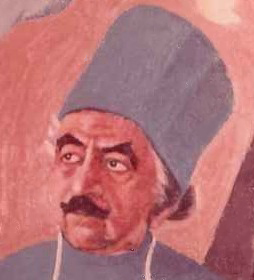
Fragment of a Portrait of the doctor Gavriil Ilizarov (1988)

== See also ==
- Israel Tsvaygenbaum, artist and author.
- Israel Tsvaygenbaum art
- Israel Tsvaygenbaum – Wrapped in Love
- In NY with Victor Topaller Israel Tsvaygenbaum.
- Israel Tsvaygenbaum – The Angel of Roses
- Israel Tsvaygenbaum – Conjured Melodies
- Israel Tsvaygenbaum – Prayers at the Tree of Life
- Israel Tsvaygenbaum on Russian TV-6, Exhibition 11–93
- Flights of the Spirit: The Art of Israel Tsvaygenbaum
