= Lev Manakhimov =

- Лев Манахимов
- Monument to Lev Manakhimov in Derbent
- Born: Lev Yakovlevich Manakhimov; 17 September 1950; Derbent, Dagestan ASSR, Russian SFSR, Soviet Union
- Died: 14 August 2021 (aged 70); Moscow, Russia
- Occupation: theatre director
- Years active: 1966–2021
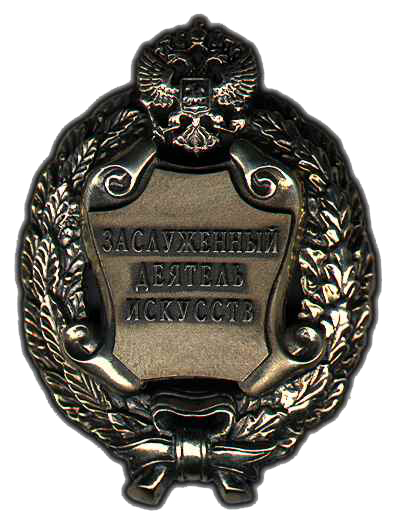
- Awards

Lev Yakovlevich Manakhimov (Russian: Лев Яковлевич Манахимов; Hebrew: לב מנחימוב; 1950–2021) was a Soviet and Russian choreographer and director. He served as the head of the Judeo-Tat Theatre from 2004 to 2021 and was an "Honored Art Worker of the Russian Federation."

== Biography ==
Lev Manakhimov was born in Derbent, Dagestan ASSR, into a Mountain Jewish family. His artistic journey began in childhood when he learned to play in a wind orchestra. As a child, he was also passionate about model car building and dreamed of becoming an automotive designer.

At the age of 16, he took up dancing and trained under choreographer Kazim Manafov. Within a year of studying dance, Lev Manakhimov was already performing national choreography alongside seasoned members of the ensemble. He continued to refine his dance skills at a cultural education college in the choreography department.

After serving in the Soviet Army, he graduated from the Russian Institute of Theatre Arts in Moscow and danced in the Russian Souvenir ensemble at Moscow State University.

In 2004, he became the head of the Judeo-Tat Theatre in Derbent.

In Derbent, he lived on Kandelaki Street and was considered the best Lezginka teacher in the city. He served as the head of the choreographic center for aesthetic education "Pirouette."

In August 2021, he fell ill with coronavirus and was transported from Derbent to Moscow for treatment, where he ultimately died from complications related to the infection. He was buried on August 16, 2021, outside Dagestan, in Israel. That same day, a mourning rally was held in the courtyard of the municipal Judeo-Tat Theatre in Derbent in his honor.

== Family ==
- Wife: Margarita Semenovna Manakhimova (1955–1996), was a conductor.
- Daughter: Jasmine, Russian singer.
- Son: Anatoly

== Titles and awards ==
- Honorary citizen of the city of Derbent
- Laureate of the Order "Heritage of Derbent"
- Honored Artist of Dagestan
- Honored Art Worker of the Russian Federation

== Legacy ==
- In 2021, the Derbent Theater was renamed the Municipal Judeo-Tat Theater named after Lev Yakovlevich Manakhimov.
- On September 17, 2022, a monument to Lev Manakhimov was unveiled in the courtyard of the Jasmine Children's Creativity Center in Derbent.
