= Hizgil Avshalumov =

Russian writer (1913–2001)

Hizgil Davidovich Avshalumov
- Hizgil Avshalumov
- Born: 16 January 1913; Nyugdi, Dagestan USSR, USSR
- Died: 17 September 2001 (aged 88); Makhachkala, Dagestan, Russian Federation
- Occupations: novelist, poet, playwright
- Writing career

Hizgil Davidovich Avshalumov (Russian: Хизгил Давидович Авшалумов; 16 January 1913 – 17 September 2001) was a Soviet novelist, poet and playwright. He wrote in languages of the Mountain Jews (Juhuri) and Russian. He was awarded the Suleyman Stalsky award. He was a USSR Union of Writers member.

== Biography ==
Hizgil Avshalumov was born in the village of Nyugdi (a suburb of the city of Derbent, Dagestan) to a peasant family sometime between the years 1913-1916 depending on the source. His father cultivated grain as a farmer, and was a veteran of World War I. He died at an early age, leaving Avshalumov and his 5 siblings orphans. He worked as a correspondent for the Mountain Region Jewish newspaper The Toiler. Later he studied at a Soviet-Party school.

From 1938 to 1941 Avshalumov was a research associate at the Institute of History, Language and Literature of the Dagestan branch of the USSR. During this period, he collected a significant number of Mountain Jews’ folklore of different genres and included them in his first book folklore book on Mountain Jews, published in 1940. It included a detailed introduction to it as well. Also in 1940 he published Russian - Juhuri terminological dictionary.

In 1939 he published in the first Judeo-Tat literary almanac his first novel, "Love." In 1940 he published the novel (Juhuri:"Бастуни джовонхо") "The victory of the Youth". Avshalumov also engaged in translation work. In 1940, Dagestan Book Publishing House published his translation of a selected works of Nizami Ganjavi. In that same year he joined USSR Union of Writers. Hizgil Avshalumov was a veteran of World War II. He fought in the North Caucasus and Belorussian fronts, was deputy commander of a cavalry saber squadrons of Cossack Regiment, and was twice wounded and shell-shocked. On Victory Day he was in Berlin. After being demobilized, Avshalumov worked as correspondent for the national newspaper (Russian:Дагестанская правда) - Dagestankaya Pravda, and later as a consultant and secretary for the Union of Writers of Dagestan. He participated in the 3rd and 4th Congress of Writers of the Russian Republic and in 5th Congress of Soviet Writers.

In 1953, he graduated from the history department of the Dagestan Pedagogical Institute (now Dagestan State University) in Makhachkala. From 1960-1991 he worked as the editor for the magazine (Juhuri:Ватан советиму) Our Soviet Motherland, where he published stories about the life of the Mountain Jews. His works include (Juhuri:"Анжал занхо") "Death to the Wives" and (Juhuri:"Шюваран ди хову") "Bigamist" and others, some of which were later included in the published collection (Juhuri:"Duhder nehirchi") "The daughter of a shepherd" in 1963. Avshalumov also released a collection of stories about the life of Mountain Jews in "The Bride's Surprise", which was translated into Russian in 1966 (Russian: "Невеста с сюрпризом").

In most of his short stories and novels (about Shimi Derbendi), Avshalumov acts as a satirist and humorist. Shimi Derbendi is a common figure of Dagestan’s people and it embodies the image of a typical representative of the Mountain Jews. For many years, novels about the ingenious Shimi Derbendi were printed on the pages of national newspapers, causing a constant interest in readers. Some of them have been published in the journal Soviet Literature and published abroad into English, German, French and Spanish. In 1969, the journal (Russian:Наш современник) - Nash Sovremennik published Avshalumov’s extensive series of short stories. In the stories "Retribution," "Family Arch," and "Legend of Love," the writer reflected the customs, traditions and way of life of the people during the dramatic events of the pre-revolutionary and Soviet periods.

Hizgil Avshalumov has released several collections of poetry, including ones for children. The book (Juhuri:"Гюльбоор") "Gyulboor" includes poetry about the fate of Gyulboor Davydova, a woman of Mountain Jew descent and a hero of the Socialist Labour Order.

A major work of Avshalumov was the historical novel (Juhuri:"Занбирор") "Sister-in-law" and (Juhuri:"Кук гудил") "Son of mummers", 1974, which both spoke about the village life of Mountain Jews as well as in the town of Derbent during the first few years after Russian Revolution.

Electronic Jewish Encyclopedia (EJE) commented on these works:

"…However, these works editorialized: characters clearly showed in black and white and separated on a "class" basis. He intentionally removed the rituals of the Jewish religion from the lives of people, gave great emphasis to superstition, etc."

Alongside those who admired his talent, Avshalumov had strong criticism as well. Electronic Jewish Encyclopedia (EJE) commented:

"Avshalumov was one of the founders of the concept of "Tat people", supposedly separate from being Jews…"

He has written four plays, including the first Judeo-Tat musical comedy (Juhuri:"Кишди хьомоли") "Sash childlessness" and the historical drama (Russian:"Толмач имама Шамиля") "The interpreter of Imam Shamil," the play (Juhuri:"Шими Дербенди") "Shimi Derbendi," and "Love is in danger." Later they were put on the stages of the Judeo-Tat, Kumyk’s (1966) and Lezgian’s (1987) theaters.

In 1991, after the collapse of the Soviet Union, Hizgil Avshalumov joined the pro-communist opposition in Russia.

Hizgil Avshalumov died on 17 September 2001 and was buried at the Jewish cemetery in Makhachkala.

A street in the city of Derbent and a school in his native village Nyugdi have been named in honor of Hizgil Avshalumov. Also, Makhachkala contains a memorial plaque in honor of Avshalumov on the street he lived on, 3 Magomed Hajiyev.

== Family ==
Avshalumov was married to Ersho Asailovna, a traditional Mountain Jew woman.

One of Avshalumov’s daughters is Lyudmila Hizgilovna Avshalumov (born in 1941, Makhachkala). She has a PhD in philosophical sciences, and is a professor and deputy chair of the Committee on Education, Science and Culture of the Republic of Dagestan. She has a son, Marat.

== Bibliography ==
The author of collections of short stories and essays:

- Friendship (1956)
- Under the plane trees (1956)
- Meeting in the spring (1960, 1989)
- As I was raised (1961)
- The Bride with a surprise (1966)
- The daughter of a shepherd (1963)
- Edge of Darkness (1965, 1978)

Historical novels Sister-in-law and Son of Mummers (1974), about the life of the Mountain Jews after the October Revolution.

- The Bride with a surprise (1966, 2007)
- The interpreter of the Imam (1967, 2008)
- My wife's brother (1971)
- Legend of Love (1972)
- The Family Arch (1976, 1984, 2000)
- poetry collection Gyulboor (1980)
- Dodgy Shimi Derbendi (1982)
- Russian Son (1987)
- The adventures of ingenious Shimi Derbendi (1998)
- historical essay The history the Hanukaev’s (1999)

== Awards ==
- Order of the Patriotic War 1st class
- Order of Friendship of Peoples
- Order of the Badge of Honour
- Stalsky Award
- Honored Cultural Worker of the Dagestan ASSR (1968)
- Honored Cultural Worker of the RSFSR (1976)
