= Suleyman Stalsky =

Russian poet from Dagestan (1869–1937)

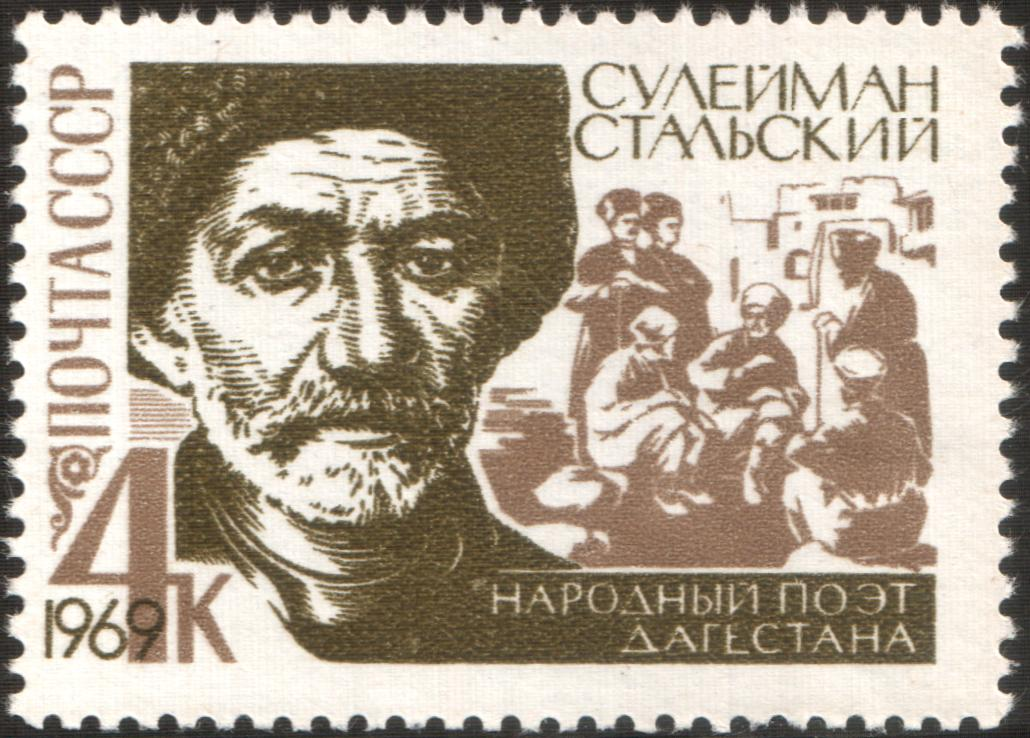
1969 Soviet Union stamp of Suleyman Stalsky

Suleiman Stalsky (Russian: Сулейман Стальский; Lezgian: Стӏал Сулейман, romanized: Sthal Suleyman; 18 May 1869 – 23 November 1937) was a North Caucasian poet of Lezgin descent from Dagestan. Russian writer Maxim Gorky described him as "Homer of 20th century".

== Legacy ==
- Suleyman-Stalsky District, where his native village Ashaga-Stal is located, was renamed in his honor on the 100th anniversary of his birthday.
- Suleyman Stalsky State Lezgian Musical and Drama Theatre
