= Yuno Semyonov =

- Born: Yuno Shaulovich Semyonov; 1899; Derbent, Dagestan Oblast, Russian Empire
- Died: 1961 (aged 61–62); Derbent, Dagestan ASSR, Soviet Union
- Occupations: prose writer, playwright, artistic director

Yuno Shaulovich Semyonov (Russian: Юно Шаулович Семёнов; Hebrew: ;יונו סמיונוב 1899–1961) was a Soviet Union prose writer, playwright and artistic director. He wrote in the Judeo-Tat language. His work was characterized by plays on the topics of the day, full of sarcasm and humor. He was one of the founders of the Judeo-Tat theatre in Derbent.

== Biography ==
Born in Derbent in 1899 in a working-class family. In 1915 he graduated from the Russian-Judeo-Tat School, received a law degree in Saint Petersburg. He worked as a typesetter in the printing house of the Derbent city newspaper, which was published in Russian. During the Russian Civil War, he fought on the side of the Bolsheviks, becoming famous as a red partisan. After the civil war, he returned to his previous job.

Since 1932, he published nine plays.

In 1936, Yuno Semyonov moved to Baku with his family. There he worked for the newspaper (Russian: «Коммунист») - "Communist". Later, he moved back to his hometown. He worked in the newspaper The Toiler in the Judeo-Tat language.

In 1941, during World War II, Yuno Semyonov went to the front. He served as a senior sergeant and was the head of the warehouse of the 1254th airfield air defense regiment. His regiment fought as part of the 1st Ukrainian Front, then as part of the 2nd Ukrainian. He demobilized on June 23, 1945. Yuno Semyonov met the end of the war in Budapest. Received a medal "For Battle Merit". Joseph Stalin expressed gratitude in his letter to the sergeant Yuno Semyonov for the capture of the cities of Vienna and Budapest.

After the war, Yuno Semyonov worked at a winery, as well as in various leadership positions. Later, under the pretext of being a relative of a traitor of motherland, he was removed from his job.

Yuno Semyonov died in 1961 on a train to Volgograd and was buried in his native city Derbent. His plays are staged in the Judeo-Tat theatre of Derbent to this day.

== Theatrical activity ==
In 1920 in Derbent, Yuno Semyonov headed a drama circle of the Mountain Jewish youth, which received the abbreviated name (Russian: «Кружок ГЕМ») - "GEM Circle", for which he wrote plays - (Judeo-Tat: Гlэмелдане илчи) - "A cunning matchmaker," (Russian: «Два старьёвщика») - "Two junkmen" and (Russian: «Кордон») - "Cordon", the same year the drama circle was closed.

In 1924, Yuno Semyonov put on two plays in the Derbent Mountain Jews circle - (Russian: «Два кожепродавца») - "Two leather sellers" and (Russian: «Хитрый сват») - "A cunning matchmaker."

The main themes of Yuno Semyonov plays were the formation of a new socialist person, anti-religious propaganda (the poem (Russian: «Купить библию») - "Buy a Bible"), the fight against the remnants of the past and the collective construction of a new life.

In 1936, Yuno Semyonov at the call of the party promoting the mixing of peoples and interethnic marriages, wrote a play (Russian: «Сводный брат») - "Stepbrother" about the love of a mountain Jew for a Lezghin girl.

In 1955, 10 years after the end of the war, Yuno Semyonov wrote the poem (Russian: «Я свидетель») - "I am a witness", where he expressed all the horrors of war through which he went through.
