= Roman Izyaev =

- Роман Изъяев
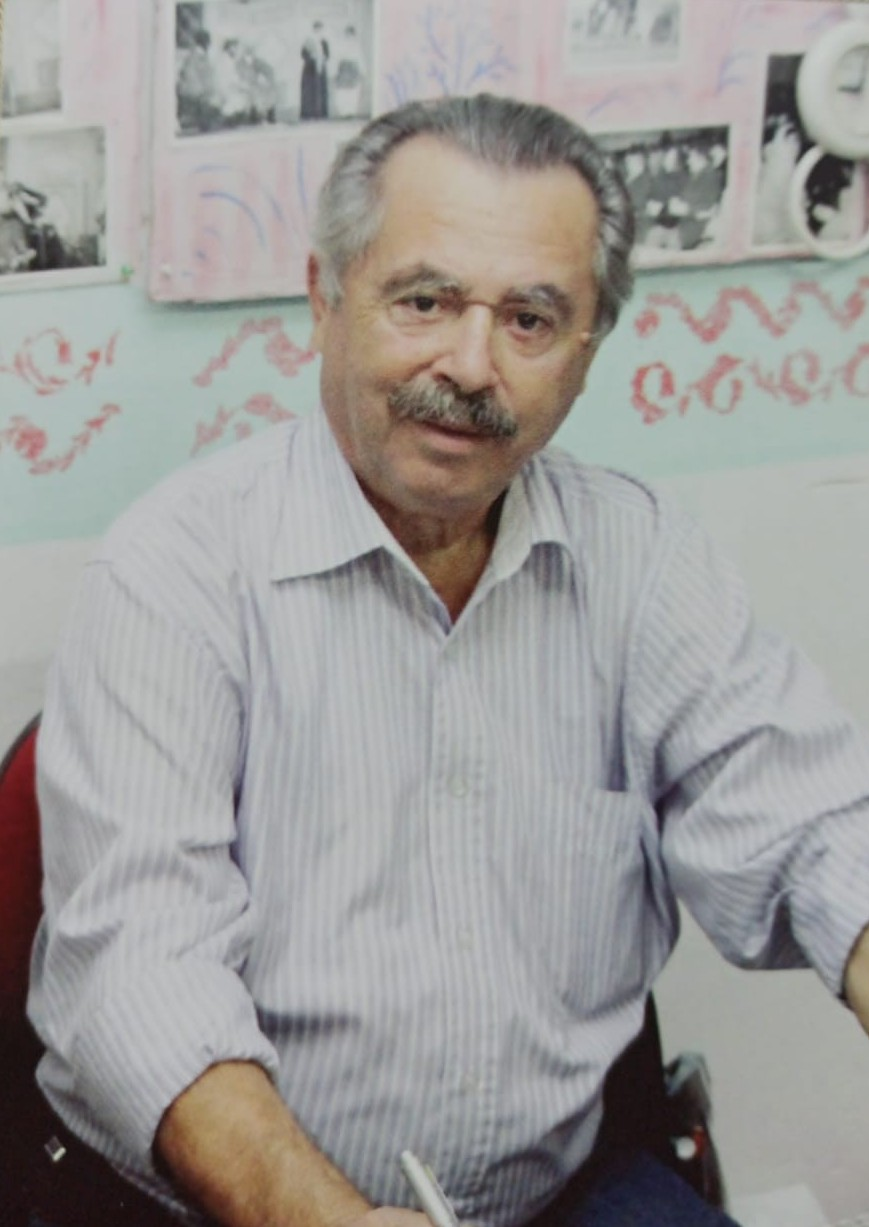
- Born: Roman Savievich Izyaev; 29 January 1940; Derbent, Dagestan ASSR, Soviet Union
- Died: 29 April 2018 (aged 78); Or Akiva, Israel
- Occupations: Stage actor, artistic director, screenwriter and scenic designer
- Years active: 1957–2018
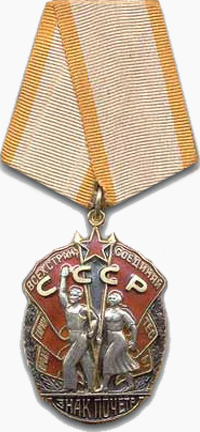
- Awards

Roman Savievich Izyaev (Russian: Роман Савиевич Изъяев; Hebrew: ;רומן איזאייב January 29, 1940 - April 29, 2018) was a Soviet, Russian and Israeli stage actor, artistic director, screenwriter and scenic designer of the Judeo-Tat theatre. For his contributions to the development of theatrical art and for his many years of creative activity, he was awarded the Order of the Badge of Honour (1985). Founder and artistic director of the first Judeo-Tat language theater "Rambam" in Israel (2001-2017). He has performed with his theater in many cities in Russia, Israel, Azerbaijan, Canada and the United States.

== Biography ==
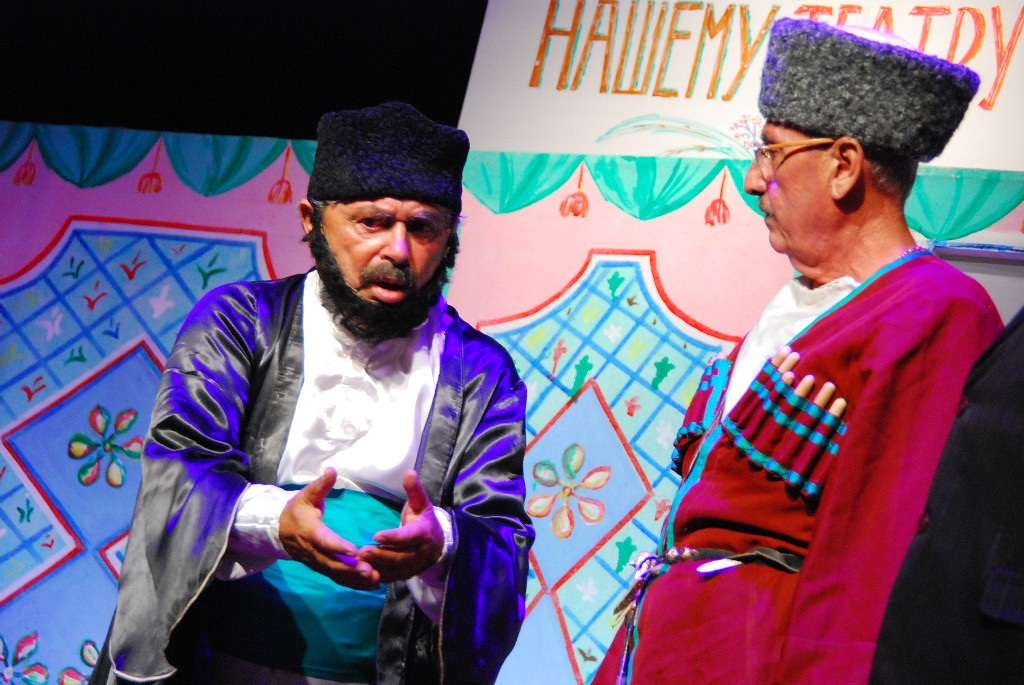
Actors of the Judeo-Tat's theatre "Rambam": Roman Izyaev & Rambam Mishiev. Israel. 2011.

Roman Izyaev was 17 years old when the famous artist Akhso Shalumova invited him to play in the Judeo-Tat theatre in the city of Derbent, which was the beginning of his theatrical life.

From 1986 to 2001, Roman Izyaev served as the artistic director of the Judeo-Tat theatre in Derbent, where he played the main roles in many performances.

In 2001 he immigrated to Israel. In the Israeli city of Hadera, Roman Izyaev founded theatre "Rambam" in the Judeo-Tat language, where he was the artistic director, actor, screenwriter and set designer. In Israel, he wrote two plays: (Juhuri: Шуьвер се зени) – "The Husband of Three Wives" and (Juhuri: Э хори Бебеho) - "The Promised Land".

During the period of his work at the theater "Rambam", Roman Izyaev performed with his theater in many cities of Israel, as well as abroad: Russia, Azerbaijan, Canada and the USA. At the Master Theater in Brooklyn, New York. The theater presented a musical comedy (Juhuri:Хуьсуьр) - "Mother-in-law" based on the play by the Azerbaijani playwright Mejid Shamkhalov.

Roman Izyaev staged performances based on the stories of the writer Hizgil Avshalumov (Juhuri: "Кишди хьомоли") - "Sash of childlessness" and (Juhuri: Шими Дербенди) - "Shimi Derbendi", where he played the role of Shimi. He also staged one-act plays by Mikhail Dadashev and "Divorce in the Caucasus", by Vyacheslav Davydov.

In 2017, due to his illness, Roman Izyaev left the stage.

Roman Izyaev died on April 29, 2018, in the city of Or Akiva, Israel.

== Awards ==
- 1985, Order of the Badge of Honour

== See also ==
- Judeo-Tat Theatre
