= Ashig Garib (opera) =

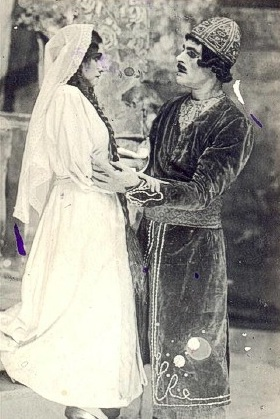
A scene from Ashig Garib

Ashig Garib (Azerbaijani: Aşıq Qərib) – is the first opera written by Azerbaijani composer Zulfugar Hajibeyov, in 1916, based on motifs of a dastan of the same name. The opera was staged in Baku, in the theater of Haji Zeynalabdin Taghiyev, for the first time.

Actors and singers such as Huseyngulu Sarabski, Huseynagha Hajibababeyov and others performed main parts of “Ashig Garib” opera. Ahmad Badalbayli, famed as Ahmed Agdamski, Rubaba Muradova and other actors acted the part of Shahsenem, Garib's beloved, at that times.
