= Judeo-Tat literature =

Literature of the Mountain Jews in the Juhuri language

Judeo-Tat literature is the literature of the Mountain Jews in the Juhuri language.

== History ==
=== Russian Empire ===
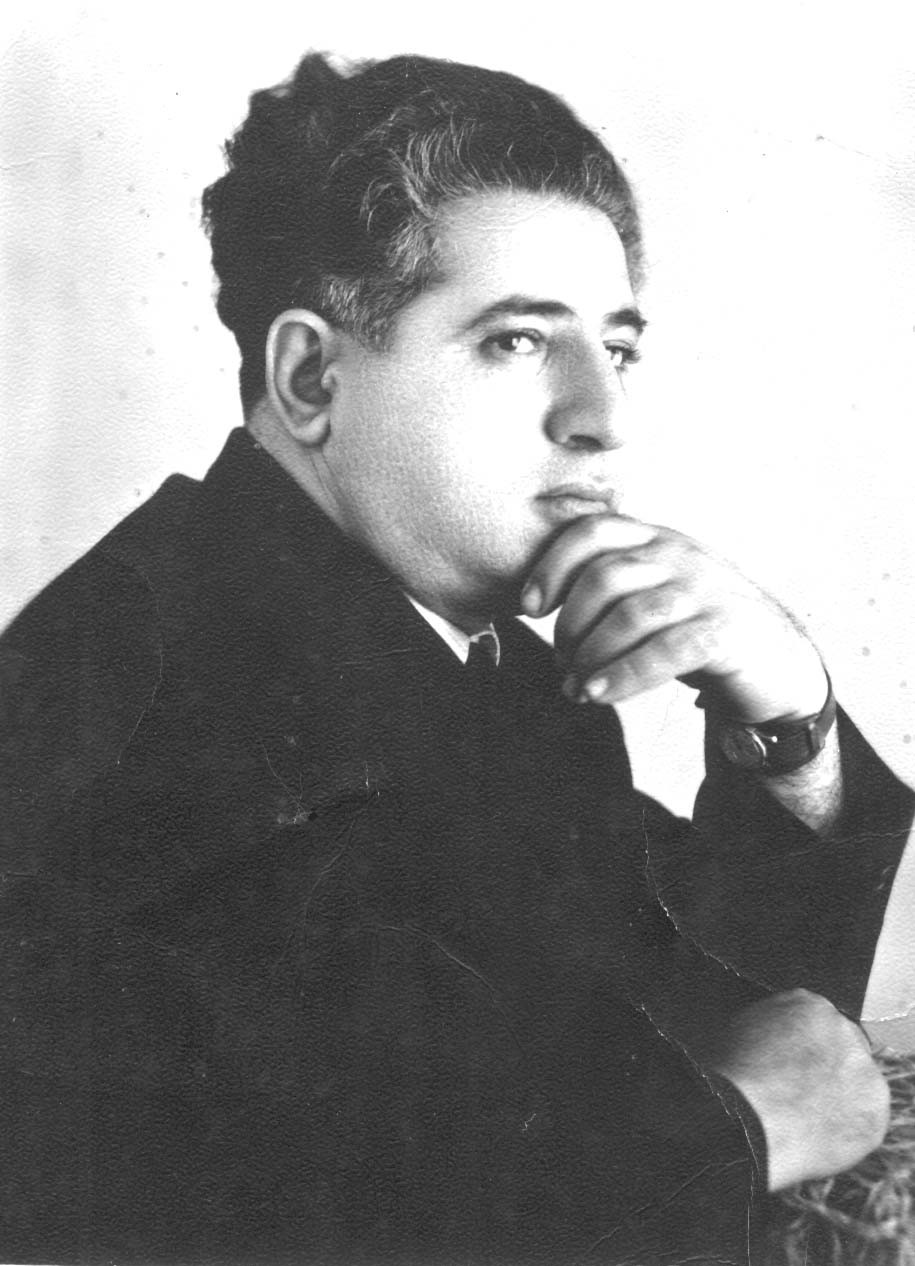
Poet Sergey Izgiyayev in 1970

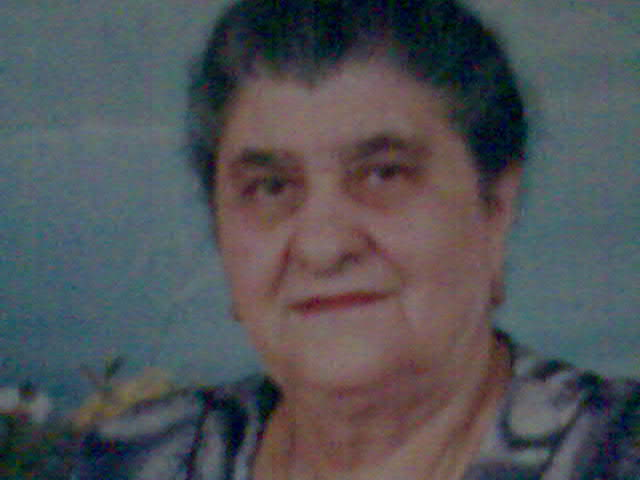
Poet Zoya Semenduyeva

Judeo-Tat literature is rich in folklore. The most popular narrators of folklore at the beginning of the 20th century were Mordecai ben Avshalom (1860–1925), Shaul Simandu (1856–1939), Khizgil Dadashev (1860–1945) and Aibolo of Tarki.

In 1904, Rabbi Yeshayahu Rabinovich was among the first to create literary works in the Judeo-Tat language for a Judeo-Tat theatre group in the city of Derbent.

=== The Soviet Union ===
In the 1920s, theatre was the main form of Judeo-Tat literature. Playwrights who wrote for the first Mountain Jewish amateur theatrical troupes include Yakov Agarunov (1907–1992), (Juhuri:Падшох, рабби ва ошир) - "Tsar, rabbi and the rich man", Herzl Gorsky (Ravvinovich) (1904–1937?), (Juhuri:Бахар дас баба-дадай) - "The fruits of the hands of the father and mother", P. Shcherbatov, (Juhuri:Кук савдогар-революционер) - "The merchant's son is a revolutionary" and Yuno Semyonov (1899–1961), who wrote plays (Juhuri:Амалданэ илчи) - "The wise matchmaker", 1924, (Juhuri:Дю алатфуруххо) - "Two junkies", 1924 and (Juhuri:Махсюм) - "Makhsum", 1927.

Since the appearance on 3 June 1928 in Derbent of a newspaper in the Judeo-Tat language Захметкеш - The Toiler, whose editor-in-chief was Asail Binaev (1882–1958), one of the first Mountain Jewish professional literati; poems in the Judeo-Tat language were published regularly. All the Mountain Jewish poets of the 1920s - Ekhiil Matatov (1888–1943), Rachamim Ruvinov (1893-1955), Yakov Agarunov, Boris Gavrilov (1908–1990), Neten Solomonov and Z. Nabinovich - were poets of Civic poetry. The theme of women's equality recurs throughout poetry of Yakov Agarunov (Juhuri:Духдар доги) - "Mountain Girl", 1928, Iskhog Khanukhov (1903–1973) (Juhuri:Джофокашэ дадай) - "Mother-toiler" and (Juhuri:Ай зан Мизрах) - "About the Woman of the East", both were written in 1928, a series of poems were written by Ekhiil Matatov and Boris Gavrilov.

The formation and development of Mountain Jewish artistic prose started by the end of the 20th century. One of its founders was Yuno Semyonov. His biggest story was (Juhuri:Ошнахой ан раби Хасдил) - "Familiar people of Rabbi Hasdil", 1928–29.

In the early 1930s a Mountain Jewish literary circle was formed in Moscow, headed by I. Ben-Ami (Benyaminov) (d. ca. 1937?). The poet, playwright and prose writer Mishi Bakhshiev (1910–1972), poets Manuvakh Dadashev (1913–1943) and Daniel Atnilov (1913–1968), the first professional literary translator Zovolun Bakhshiev (1896–1968) and others quickly took the leading place in the Judeo-Tat literature. In the mid-1930s, this literary circle in Moscow ceased functioning.

In 1932, poet Mishi Bakhshiev wrote his first book - Komsomol, the main theme was the social disintegration of the Mountain Jews. Another theme in his work was the involvement of Mountain Jewish women in the Soviet reality (Juhuri: Ма‘ни духдару) - "Song of a Girl", 1933, (Juhuri:Рапорт) - "Report", 1933 and (Juhuri:Хумор) - "Gamble", 1933-34. In the second half of the 1930s the playwright Mishi Bakhshiev wrote a play (Juhuri:Бесгуни игидхо) - "Victory of the Heroes" (1936) about the civil war in Dagestan. It was the first heroic drama in the Judeo-Tat language. Later Mishi Bakhshiev wrote (Juhuri:Хори) - "Earth", 1939 and in 1940, he created a play in verse for folklore motifs: (Juhuri:Шох угли, шох Аббас ва хомбол Хасан) - "Shah's son, Shah Abbas and loader Hasan". Bakhshiyev's first novel was (Juhuri:Э пушорехьи тозе зиндегуни) - "Towards a New Life", 1932, in which he followed the Azerbaijani narrative models. The second, his biggest story was (Juhuri:Ватагачихо) - "Fishermen", 1933, about the life of the Mountain Jewish fishermen from Derbent.

From the end of 1934 until the termination of publishing and cultural activities in the Judeo-Tat language in Azerbaijan in 1938, a Judeo-Tat literary circle existed in Baku under the newspaper Kommunist (editor-in-chief Yakov Agarunov) and the Mountain Jewish department of the Azerbaijan State Publishing House, which was headed by Yakov Agarunov and Yuno Semyonov.

Poet Dubiya Bakhshiev (1914–1993), in his poem (Juhuri:Занхо а колхоз) - "Woman in the collective farm", 1933, combines the theme of women with the theme of the creation of the Mountain Jewish collective farms.

Yuno Semyonov continued to play a significant role in the dramaturgy of the 1930s, writing his drama (Juhuri:Дю бирор) - "Two brothers".

In the late 1930s, novelist, poet and playwright Hizgil Avshalumov (1913–2001) published a large story (Juhuri:Басгуни джовонхо) - "The Victory of the Young", 1940, it appeared with essays and feuilletons. Avshalumov dedicated a number of his works to the modern hero of the Mountain Jewish’s village (Juhuri:Маслахат на хингар) - "Council and Khinkal", (Juhuri:Аджал занхо) - "Death to wives", (Juhuri:Шюваран дю хову) - "Bigamist”, essays about the Hero of Socialist Labour Gyulboor Davydova (1892–1983) and Solomon (Shelmun) Rabaev (1916–1963) and others. The story (Juhuri:Занбирор) - "Sister-in-law" is about the life of the Mountain Jews social elite in Derbent on the eve and during the revolution and in the first years of Soviet Union power. In his novel (Juhuri:Кук гудил) - "The son of the mummer", 1974, Avshalumov gave a detailed description of the Mountain Jew farmer and his centuries-old traditional way of life. Later, Hizgil Avshalumov created a folklore image of the witty (Juhuri:Шими Дербенди) - "Shimi from Derbent" (Mountain Jewish analogue of Hershel of Ostropol)

The Great Purge of 1936–38 caused a cruel blow to the Judeo-Tat literature. Herzl Gorsky (Ravvinovich), Ekhiil Matatov, I. Ben-Ami (Benyaminov, I.) and Asail Binaev were arrested. With the exception of Asail Binaev, they all died in Soviet prisons and gulags.

During the World War II years of the Soviet Union with Germany (1941-45), most figures of the Judeo-Tat literature were drafted into the army. Poet Manuvakh Dadashev was killed in the war. During the four years of the war, not a single literary and artistic book in the Judeo-Tat language was published.

In the 1940s, the authorities closed in Derbent the Mountain Jewish newspaper Vatan. From 1946 to the end of 1953, Judeo-Tat literature existed only implicitly. All these years the Mountain Jewish section of the writers' organization did not function, and the creative issues of the Judeo-Tat literature disappeared from the agenda of the Dagestan Writers' Union. Only at the end of 1953 the publication of a small collection of poems by Daniil Atnilov (Juhuri:Чихрат вахд) - "The Image of Time" renewed the functioning of the Judeo-Tat literature as one of the literatures of Dagestan.

Since the 1950s, prose has been predominant in Judeo-Tat literature. The leading role in it belongs to Mishi Bakhshiev and Hizgil Avshalumov.

Since 1955 began to appear in the Judeo-Tat language almanac (Juhuri:Ватан советиму) - "The Soviet Homeland". In 1946, in Dagestan, the circle of readers of the Judeo-Tat literature is constantly narrowing due to the termination of school education in the Judeo-Tat language.

Mishi Bakhshiev originally published his works in Russian ("Stories about My Countrymen", 1956, a collection of essays and short stories "Simple People", 1958 and "Noisy gardens", 1962). In these books, the author spoke not so much specifically as the Mountain Jewish, but as a general Dagestan writer. In 1963 Mishi Bakhshiev published a novel (Juhuri:Хушахой онгур) - "Bunches of grapes".

In 1972, Mikhail Dadashev (1936) published (Juhuri:Хьэлоле мерд) - "Noble Man", a collection of humorous stories. In 1977, he released (Juhuri:Тубономе) - "Confession", a collection of satirical stories. In 1980, he published (Juhuri:Бироргьо) - "Brothers", a novel, and in 1983, (Juhuri:Гьисмет) - "Fate", a short story.

The Judeo-Tat children writer in the post-Stalin period was Amaldan Kukullu (1935–2000). He released a collection of stories (Juhuri:Синемиши) - "Testing", 1968, and others.

Poetry in the Judeo-Tat literature of the 1950s-70s was mostly from achievements of the 1930s. Most prolific and famous poet of that period was Daniil Atnilov. Permanently living in Moscow, in isolation from the everyday elements of the Judeo-Tat language. His collection (Juhuri:Гюлхой инсони) - "The Color of Mankind", 1971 was published posthumously that summarized his work of the 1950s and 1960s.

A number of poets of the 20th century created their works in the Judeo-Tat language, such as Sergey Izgiyayev (1922–1972), created poems and plays: (Juhuri: Иму гъэлхэнд шолуминим) - We are the defenders of the World (1952), (Juhuri:Фикиргьой шогьир) - "Thoughts of the Poet" (1966), (Juhuri:Муьгьбет ве гьисмет) - "The fate and love" (1972) and a number of other works.

Shimshun Safonov, in 1968, created a collection of poetry (Juhuri:Парза, ма‘ни ма) - "Fly, my verse".

Poet Zoya Semenduev (1929–2020) released a collection (Juhuri:Войгей дуьл) - "The Command of the Heart". In 2007, published the book (Juhuri:Духдер эн дуь бебе) - "Daughter of two fathers", which includes the play of the same name and fairy tales.

=== Russia ===
At the end of the 20th century, a number of Mountain Jewish writers wrote only in Russian, such as the poet Lazar Amirov (1936–2007), novelist Felix Bakhshiev (1937), literary critic and novelist Manashir Azizov (1936–2011), and Asaf Mushailov (1952).

=== Israel ===
For some Mountain Jews, Israel became not only their new homeland, but also a source of inspiration for their literary creativity. Initially, Mountain Jews in Israel wrote in the languages of the countries they came from. However, a new generation of writers and poets began publishing exclusively in Hebrew, such as children's author Arnold Ikhaev (Hebrew: ארנולד איחייב) (b. 1981). He published fairy tales in verse, such as (Hebrew: המכחול שצייר את הכל) - The Brush That Painted Everything, (Hebrew: הפרפר והפר) - The Butterfly and the Bull, (Hebrew: הפוני של נוני) - The pony of Noni, (Hebrew: סוד המפתח והכי גדול זה להיות קטן) - The mystery of the key, and the greatest thing — to be small.

Among the Mountain Jews who continued to write in languages other than Hebrew while living in Israel was Eldar Gurshumov (1940–2024) — a poet, singer, and bard. He authored several collections of poems in Judeo-Tat and Azerbaijani, including (Juhuri:Рубаи) - Ruba'i, (Juhuri:Йэ бэндэюм) - I am a human, (Juhuri:Чор-джэргэи и ду-джэргэи) - Quatrain and Couplet, and (Juhuri:Газельхо) - Ghazal, among others.

Bat-Zion Abramova (b. 1953) is a poet. She wrote poems in the Judeo-Tat language: (Juhuri:Tazə џərüs) - Young Bride, (Juhuri:Dü dədəy) - Two homelands, and (Juhuri:Cuhurbirə џəsont nisdi) - It's Not Easy to Be Jews.

Raya-Rakhil Razilova (b. 1975) published works in both Judeo-Tat and Hebrew. Her writings include Rakhil, or the Whole Life on the Shelf and the poem (Juhuri:Эри Дедейме) - Mother.

== Literature ==
- Agarunov Ya.M., Tat (Jewish) - Russian dictionary. M., 1997.
- Anisimov I.Sh., Caucasian Jews - Highlanders. - M .: "Science", 2002.
- Anisimov I.Sh., Caucasian Jews - Highlanders, newspaper. "Rassvet", No 18. - SPb., April 30, 1881.
- Berg., Caucasian Jews, Caucasus, # 250, 1895.
- Garkavi, A. Ja. (1874). Skazaniia evreiskikh pisatelei o khazarskom tsarstve (Accounts by Jewish writers of the Khazar empire). St. Petersburg.
- Grunberg A.L. The language of the North Azerbaijani Tats. L., 1963.
- Grunberg A.L., Davydova L. Kh. Tat language, in the book: Fundamentals of Iranian linguistics. New Iranian languages: Western group, Caspian languages. M., 1982.
- Kurdov, K. M. (1907). Gorskie evrei Dagestana (Mountain Jews of Daghestan). Moscow.
- Hebrew languages and dialects // Brief Jewish Encyclopedia - Jerusalem: Society for the Study of Jewish Communities, 1982. - Volume 2, columns 417.
- Miller V.F. Materials for studying the Judeo-Tat language. SPb., 1892.
- Miller V.F. Essays on the morphology of the Hebrew-Tat dialect. SPb., 1892.

== Mountain Jewish authors ==
- Yakov Agarunov (1907–1992)
- Daniil Atnilov (1913–1968)
- Hizgil Avshalumov (1913–2001)
- Mishi Bakhshiev (1910–1972)
- Manuvakh Dadashev (1913–1943)
- Mikhail Dadashev (1936)
- Boris Gavrilov (1908–1990)
- Mikhail Gavrilov (1926–2014)
- Sergey Izgiyayev (1922–1972)
- Amaldan Kukullu (1935–2000)
- Mordecai ben Avshalom (1860–1925)
- Ekhiil Matatov (1888–1943)
- Asaf Pinkhasov (1884–1920)
- Zoya Semenduyeva (1929–2020)
- Yuno Semyonov (1899–1961)
