= Amaldan Kukullu =

- Амалдан Кукуллу
- Born: Амал Данилович Кукулиев; January 3, 1935; Khasavyurt, Dagestan ASSR, Soviet Union
- Died: May 25, 2000 (aged 65); Moscow, Russia
- Occupations: poet, storyteller, folklorist

Amal Danilovich Kukuliev, also known under his pen name as Amaldan Kukullu (Russian: Амал Данилович Кукулиев; Hebrew: אַמַלְדָּן קוּקוּלוּ; January 03, 1935 – May 25, 2000) was a Soviet and Russian poet, storyteller, folklorist, and researcher of the oral epic of the Mountain Jews (Juhuri). One of the first systematizers and popularizers of Mountain Jewish folklore in the Soviet period. The author of more than 10 published books, both in his native language – Judeo-Tat, and in Russian.

== Biography ==
Amaldan Kukullu was born in 1935 into a Mountain Jewish family in the city of Khasavyurt, located in Dagestan, Russia.

His father, Danil Kukullu, was an activist involved in the collectivization movement: he voluntarily donated large plots of land with vineyards and gardens for collective use. He died in 1970 and was buried in Makhachkala (Dagestan, Russia).

His mother, Shura (Alexandra Nikolaevna Shubaeva), was a leading actress and a key figure in the creation of the first Judeo-Tat theater in Khasavyurt. She died in 2003 and was buried in Netivot, Israel.

From a young age, Amaldan Kukullu devoted his life to collecting, studying, and preserving the epic traditions of the Mountain Jews. While studying in the journalism department at Rostov State University, he officially turned his attention to Mountain Jewish folklore for the first time, dedicating his 1969 diploma thesis to the subject. Following this work, he was recommended for postgraduate studies at the Institute of Oriental Studies of the USSR Academy of Sciences.

In 1955, Amaldan Kukullu began his career as a correspondent for various media outlets in Dagestan. His first publications appeared in the republican newspaper Vatan. Around the same time, he initiated regular expeditions throughout the Caucasus, aiming to systematically collect the oral folklore of the Mountain Jews in their traditional settlement areas.

In 1962, he enrolled in the Faculty of Philosophy at Dagestan State University. The following year, in 1963, his first books Scoot-scat! (Russian: Рысь-брысь) and Baby Camel (Russian: Верблюжонок) were published in Moscow by Detsky Mir. That same year, he published a satirical feuilleton titled The Intrigues of the Cunning Amal (Russian: Козни хитрого Амала), which attracted criticism for "formalism" in his work and ultimately led to his denial of admission to the Union of Writers of Dagestan.

Also in 1963, Kukullu transferred to the Faculty of Journalism at Rostov State University. He continued publishing poetry, with his work appearing in the newspaper Dagestankaya Pravda and the magazine Don.

In 1965, his poetry collection Choice of the Path (Russian: Выбор пути) was published by Soviet Writer in Moscow. His poems also appeared in prominent newspapers such as Pravda and Izvestia. That same year, he moved to Moscow, married Mira Gadalyevna Nasimova, and welcomed the birth of their son a year later.

In 1966, his poetry book in the Judeo-Tat language, Man and the Sea (Judeo-Tat: Одоми ве дерьёгь), was published by Dagestan Book Publishing House in Makhachkala. Two years later, in 1968, a collection of stories titled The Trial (Judeo-Tat: Синемиши) was published in the same language by Daguchpedgiz.

In 1969, Amaldan Kukullu defended his diploma thesis titled Judeo-Tat Fairy Tales and Historical Reality by Periods (Iranian Period) (Russian: Татские сказки и историческая действительность по периодам (иранский период)), which marked the first official recognition in the USSR of the existence of Mountain Jewish folklore.

In 1972, his fairy tale collections Stubborn Sparrow (Russian: Упрямый воробей) and Tell Me, Dad (Russian: Расскажи мне, папа) were published by Malysh in Moscow. This was followed in 1974 by the release of The Golden Chest (Russian: Золотой сундук) through Nauka.

In 1978, Amaldan Kukullu began publishing the literary almanac From the Russian Golgotha (Russian: С русской Голгофы) in Moscow via samizdat (underground publishing). His work attracted the attention of Soviet authorities, and in 1983, his apartment was searched by the KGB. Portions of his collected folklore materials were confiscated, and he was imprisoned in Butyrka prison.

After the fall of the Soviet Union, Amaldan Kukullu continued his literary and cultural efforts. In 1991, he founded his own publishing house, Amaldanik. That same year, he published two poetry collections: The Legend of the Song (Russian: Легенда о песне) and My Continuation (Russian: Мое продолжение), both in Moscow through Amaldanik.

In 1995, he released a collection of poems and songs by the defender of the Mountain Jewish people, Mordecai ben Avshalom (1860–1925). In 1997, he published a multilingual anthology of the Mountain Jewish proverbs and sayings titled Echo of the Past and Call of Future Epochs (Russian: Эхо минувших и зов грядущих эпох).

Amaldan Kukullu died in Moscow on May 25, 2000. He was laid to rest at Vostryakovskoye Cemetery.
