= Aba-Sava =

Aba-Sava Аба-Сава
- Village
- Location within Republic of Dagestan Location within Russia
- Coordinates: 42°01′27″N 48°15′51″E
- Country: Russian Empire
- Region: Dagestan Oblast
- District: Kyurinskiy okrug

Population
  - Total: 0
- Time zone: UTC+03:00

Aba-Sava, also known as Abasava, Aba-Sovo, or Abas-oba (Russian: Абасава, Аба-Сава, Аба-Сово, Абас-оба) was the capital of a small semi-independent Mountain Jewish "principality" in Safavid Daghestan that existed from the 1630s until around 1800. It was a village located in the Kyurinskiy okrug of the Dagestan Oblast. The town no longer exists today.

== Geography ==
Aba-Sava was the capital of a territory located in one of the valleys near Derbent—about 10 km south of the city, close to the Caspian Sea and near the village of Dzhalgan. At the time, the area was apparently inhabited primarily by Mountain Jews, as evidenced by the surrounding population's name for it: Dzhukhud-Kata or Dzhugyut-Katta or Juhud-Kata (Russian: Джухуд-Ката / Джугьут-Катта), meaning "The Jewish Valley." Aba-Sava was the largest settlement in the valley and served as the spiritual center of the local Jewish community.

To the south of Derbent lay the so-called Ulus Mahallah, a region that was part of the Derbent Khanate. Within this mahallah, two villages—Nyugdi and Aba-Sava—once had exclusively Mountain Jewish populations. Several other villages in the area also had Jewish quarters.

According to the Jewish traveler Judah Chorny, local Muslims reported that the Mountain Jews of Aba-Sava were engaged in agriculture, gardening, viticulture, and fishing.

== History ==
Aba-Sava was founded around the 1630s, when a large community of Jews was forced to leave Derbent. Most of these expelled Jews settled approximately 10 km south of the city, where they established the settlement of Aba-Sava. The oldest known grave in the local cemetery, discovered by Judah Chorny, dates to 1687.

The settlement likely emerged during the reign of the Persian Shah Abbas I (1571–1629), who was known for resettling Jewish communities. It was under his rule that the Jewish settlement of Rukel was also founded. The name "Aba-Sava" may have derived from "Abbasovskoye," possibly in reference to the Shah.

Aba-Sava grew rapidly during the persecution of Jews by the Persian ruler Nader Shah (1688–1747), who in 1743 destroyed the village of Rustov in present-day Azerbaijan along with other settlements.

The khans of Derbent, Fath-Ali Khan (1736–1789) and his son Shaykh Ali Khan (1778–1822), were known for their support of Aba-Sava's Jewish residents. Fath-Ali Khan formally granted the community rights to the land of Aba-Sava, solidifying their claim. The residents of Aba-Sava cultivated madder, a plant used to produce red dye for coloring threads in carpet weaving, as well as silk and cotton fabrics.

During Fath-Ali Khan's reign (1758–1789), a land dispute arose between the Mountain Jews of Aba-Sava and a neighboring Lezgin village. Fath-Ali Khan personally adjudicated the matter, ruling in favor of the Jews and issuing a deed of sale for the disputed land. According to Judah Chorny, this document, bearing the Khan's signature and affirming that the land was granted to the Jewish community in perpetuity, was preserved by the elders of the Derbent Jewish community.

Fath-Ali Khan also allowed Mountain Jews from the destroyed village of Rustov, near present-day Quba in Azerbaijan, to resettle in Aba-Sava. As a result, many Rustov Jews relocated there during the 1760s.

It is believed that Jews from the village of Şuduq—located about 8 km south of Rustov—also resettled in Aba-Sava, except for those who remained behind and converted to Islam. Interestingly, part of the current Muslim population of Şuduq belongs to the tukkhum (clan) known as Israelites, suggesting a Jewish ancestry.

In 1799, Shaykh Ali Khan, the ruler of Derbent and Quba, declared his allegiance to the Russian Empire and accepted its citizenship. Surkhay Khan (1744–1826), ruler of Gazikumukh Khanate, viewed this move as a betrayal. In retaliation, his troops marched into Derbent and subsequently attacked Aba-Sava.

In his novel The Poppy Trail, writer Mikhail Dadashev describes the event as follows:

The villainous attack on Aba-Sava, carried out by one of the ruling feudal lords of Dagestan, was provoked by the tsar’s general, Count Valerian Zubov (1771–1804)—the brother of Platon Zubov (1767–1822), the last favorite of Catherine II.

This was in 1796, during the Persian expedition of 1796 led by Zubov, aimed at capturing and annexing Derbent.

According to historical accounts, in 1799 Surkhay Khan led a surprise night attack on Aba-Sava. After a brutal battle, in which nearly 160 defenders were killed, his forces executed all captured men, razed the village, and took the women and children as spoils of war.

Judas Chorny offers a harrowing account of the massacre:

One Passover day that year, many men from Aba-Sava had gone to sea to fish. When they returned, they found devastation: all the houses were burned, corpses lay in the yards. Women, children, and the elderly had been stabbed with daggers like animals; many were mutilated with sabers and pikes, many beheaded. Among the dead, living children cried out in terror.

Surkhay Khan's warriors captured around 150 people from Aba-Sava, including the sister of the elderly man who recounted the tragedy to Judas Chorny. The surviving residents who managed to fled to Derbent.

Shaykh Ali Khan allocated land within the city of Derbent for the Mountain Jewish refugees. He also demanded that Surkhay Khan return the Jews who had been taken captive. However, not all of them returned—many had already been sold into slavery, while others had been killed.

Judah Chorny, who later visited the site where Aba-Sava once stood, wrote that only ruins remained of the settlement.

This marked the end of the Mountain Jewish settlements in the so-called "The Jewish Valley." The surviving Jews who managed to fled went into hiding and eventually found refuge in Derbent, under the protection of the local ruler, Fath-Ali Khan, whose domain extended to the city of Quba.

Thus, the destruction of Aba-Sava led to the revival of the Jewish community in Derbent. For many years, the Jews of Derbent continued to bury their dead in the cemetery of Aba-Sava. The latest tombstone discovered by Judah Chorny dates to 1827.

After the death of Fath-Ali Khan, his successor Shikhali Khan granted Jews equal rights alongside Muslims in Derbent. They were given the status of permanent residents and were permitted to settle in the city center. As a result, the Mountain Jewish quarter known as Narrow Street (Judeo-Tat: Тенге-махале) emerged near the southern wall of the city.

Russian ethnographer and ethnologist Ilya Anisimov dates the destruction of Aba-Sava to 1800. He records that the surviving Mountain Jews resettled in Derbent, each purchasing land to build their own homes. According to Anisimov, this land—amounting to 250 dessiatin—was recognized as Jewish property. However, during the time of Muridism (the uprising led by Imam Shamil), the land was confiscated. Although the Jews retained legal documents proving ownership, and even though local Muslims acknowledged the land's rightful Jewish ownership, Anisimov notes that the land was never returned, even after the end of the Caucasian War.

The number of Mountain Jews who survived the destruction of Aba-Sava can be estimated based on the 1810 census, which recorded 166 Jewish men living in Derbent. Although the number of women was not documented, it is inferred that approximately 250 Jews in total survived. Given that 160 men were killed defending the village and around 150 people were taken captive, it can be concluded that at least 600 Mountain Jews lived in Aba-Sava prior to its destruction.

After the destruction of Aba-Sava, the rabbinical center relocated with the surviving Jews to Derbent.

== Notable people ==
Several piyyut (liturgical poems) composed in Hebrew by the paytan Elisha ben Shmuel a-Katan, who lived in Aba-Sava, have been preserved. Judah Chorny published three of these piyutim.

The theologian Gershon Lala ben Moshe Nakdi, known for his commentary on Maimonides' Yad ha-Hazaka, also lived in Aba-Sava during the 18th century.

The Kabbalistic work Kol Mevasser ("The Voice of the Messenger") was likewise written in Aba-Sava. Its author, Mattatya ben Shmuel ha-Kohen Mizrahi, originally came from Shamakhi in present-day Azerbaijan.
