= Qırmızı Qəsəbə =

Qırmızı Qəsəbə Гырмызы Гәсәбә העיר האדומה Красная Слобода
- Municipality
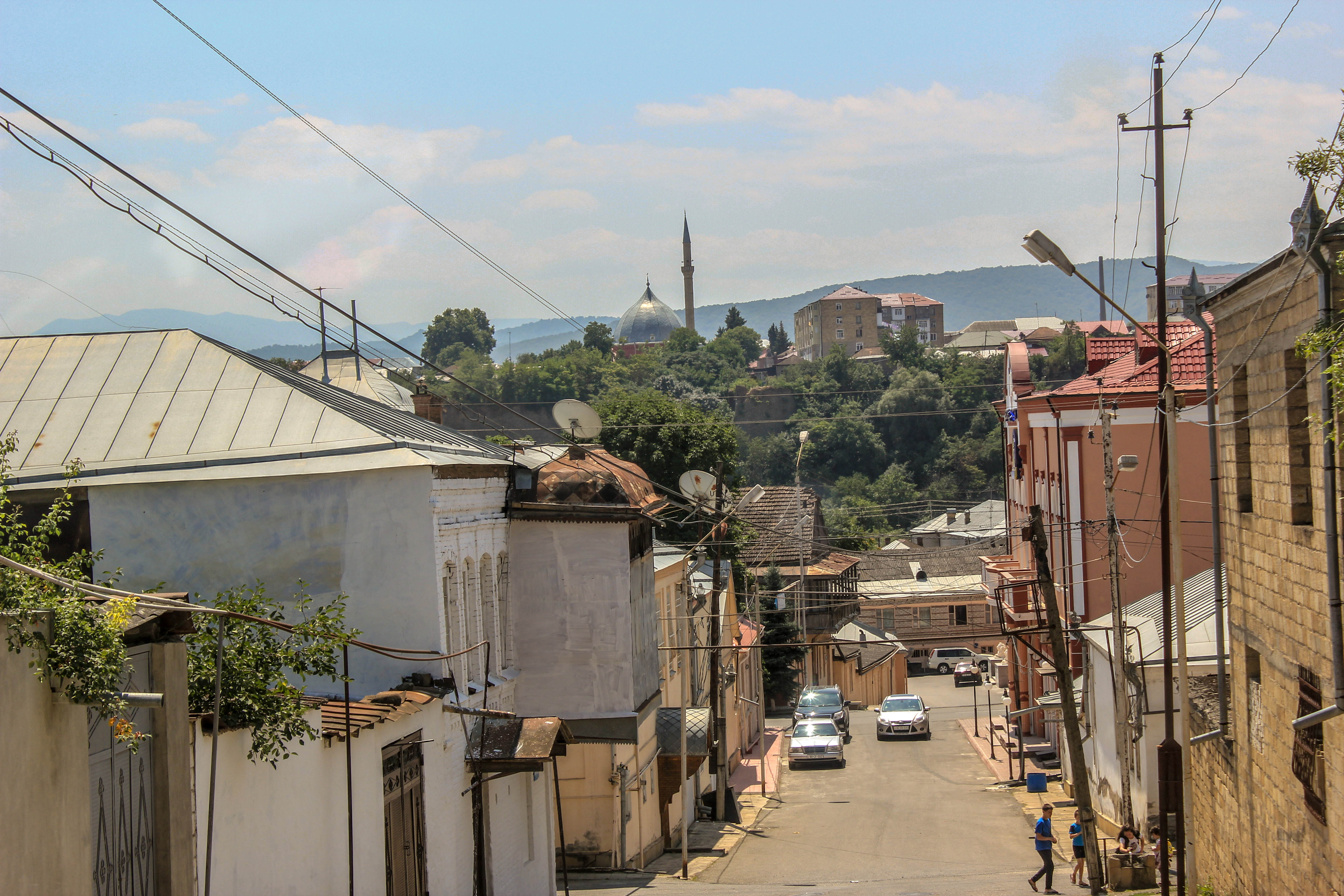
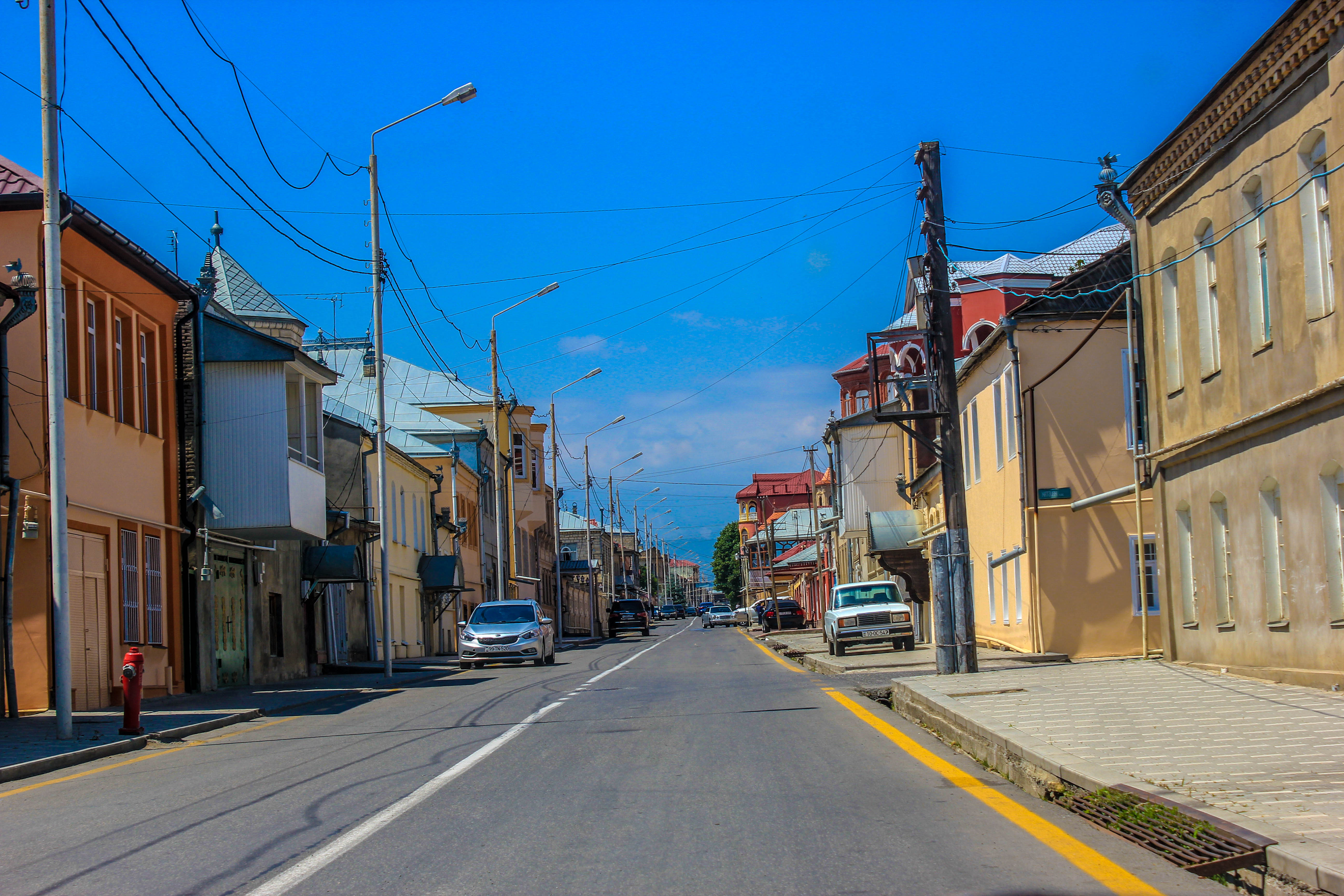
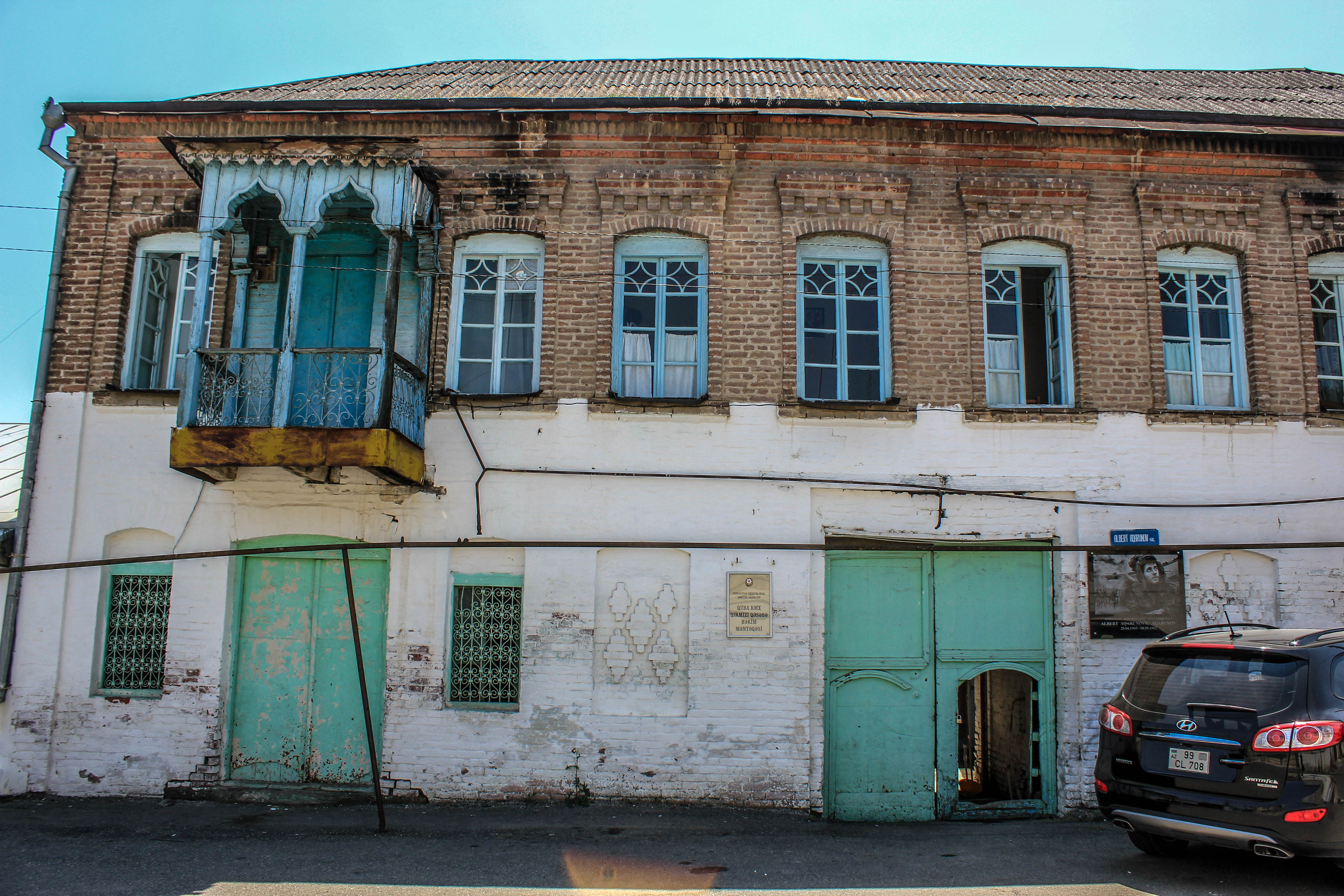
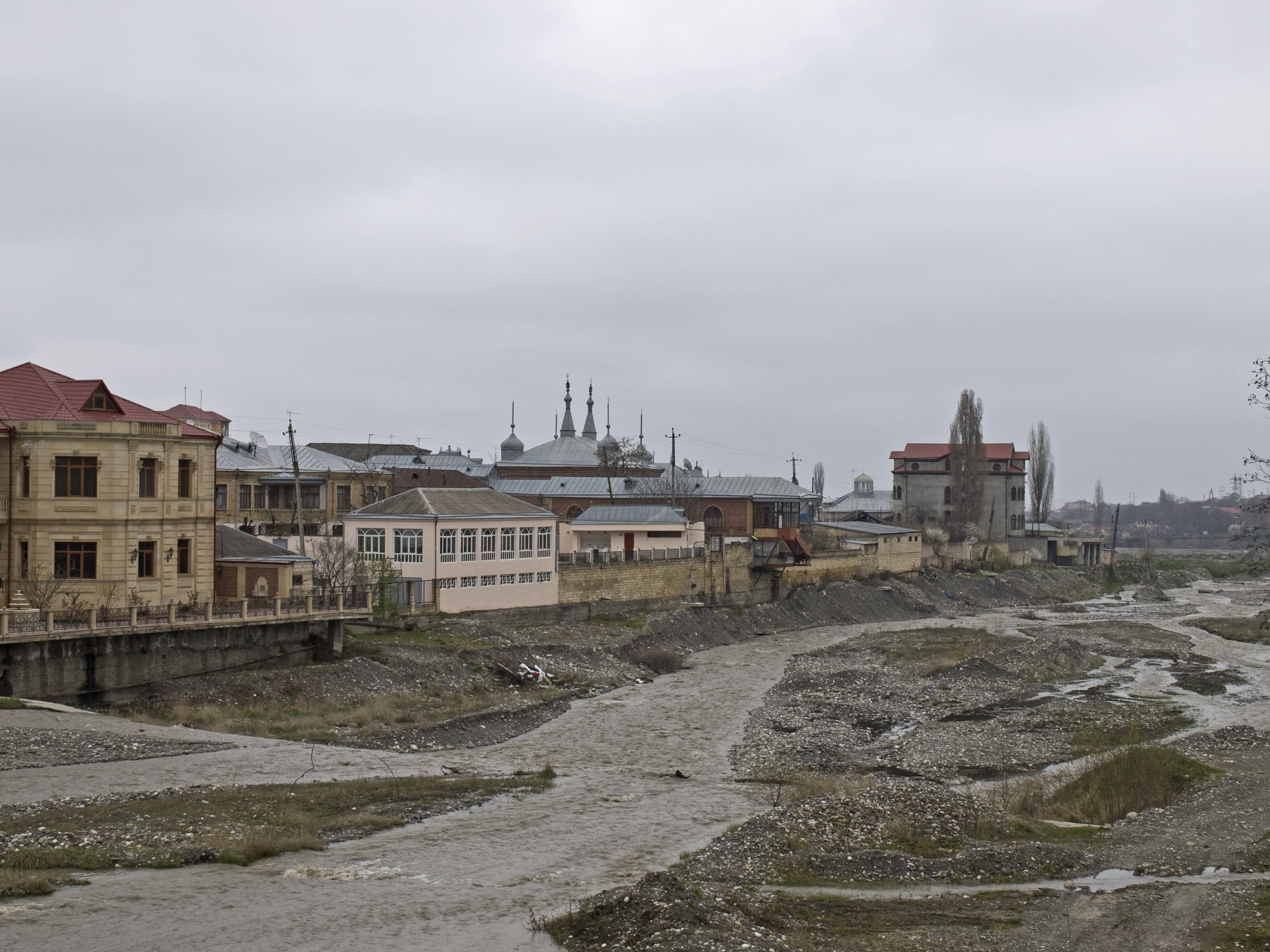
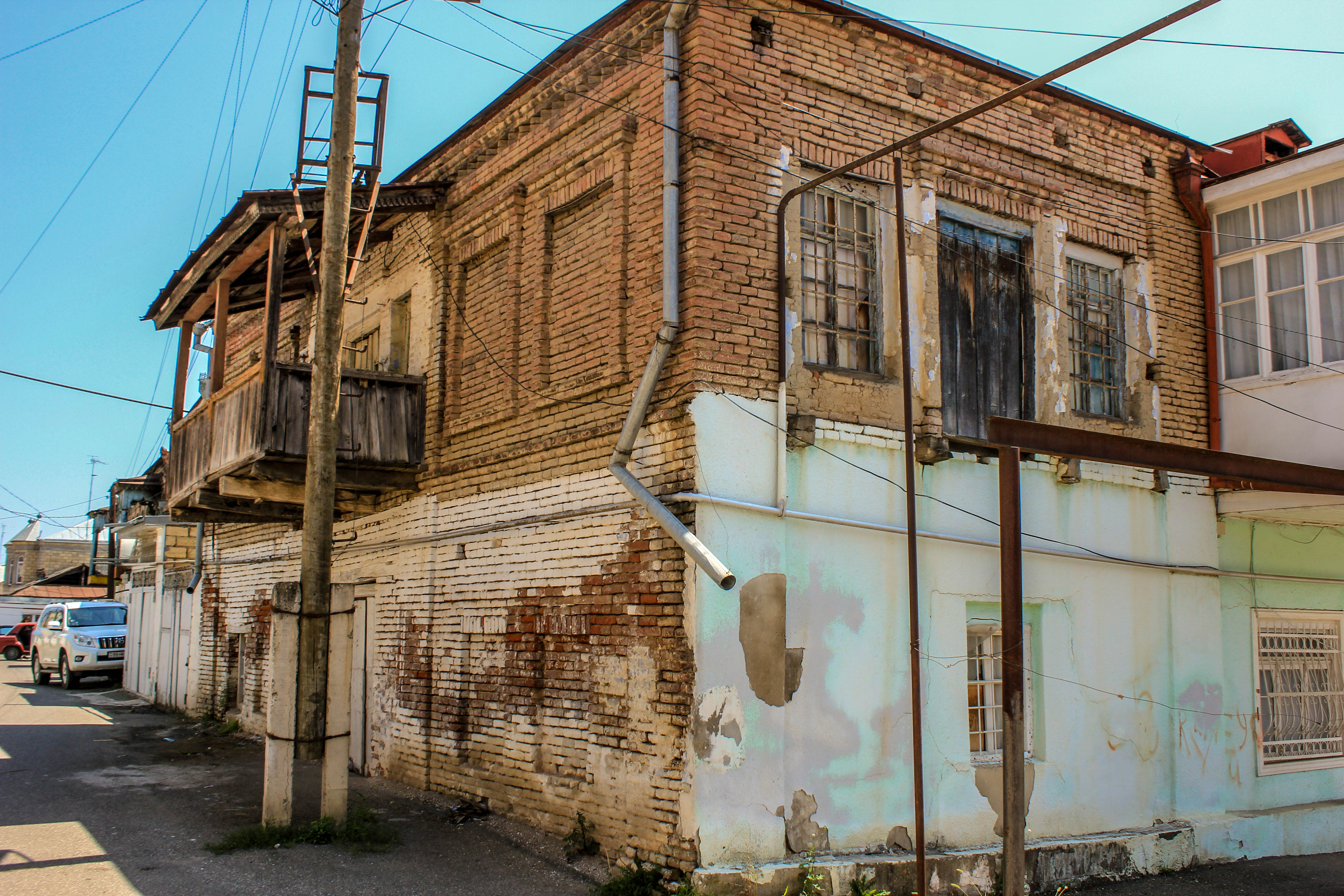
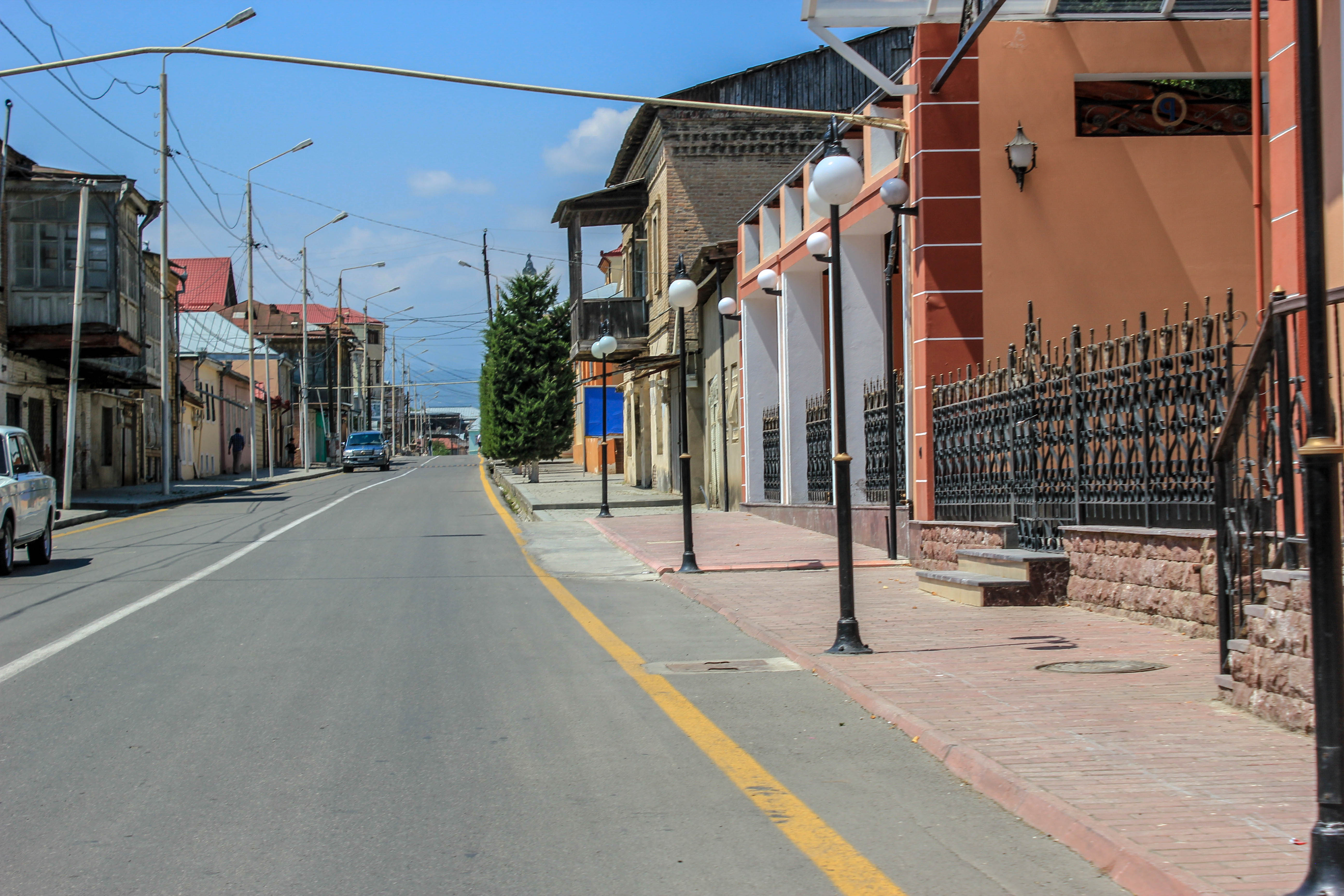
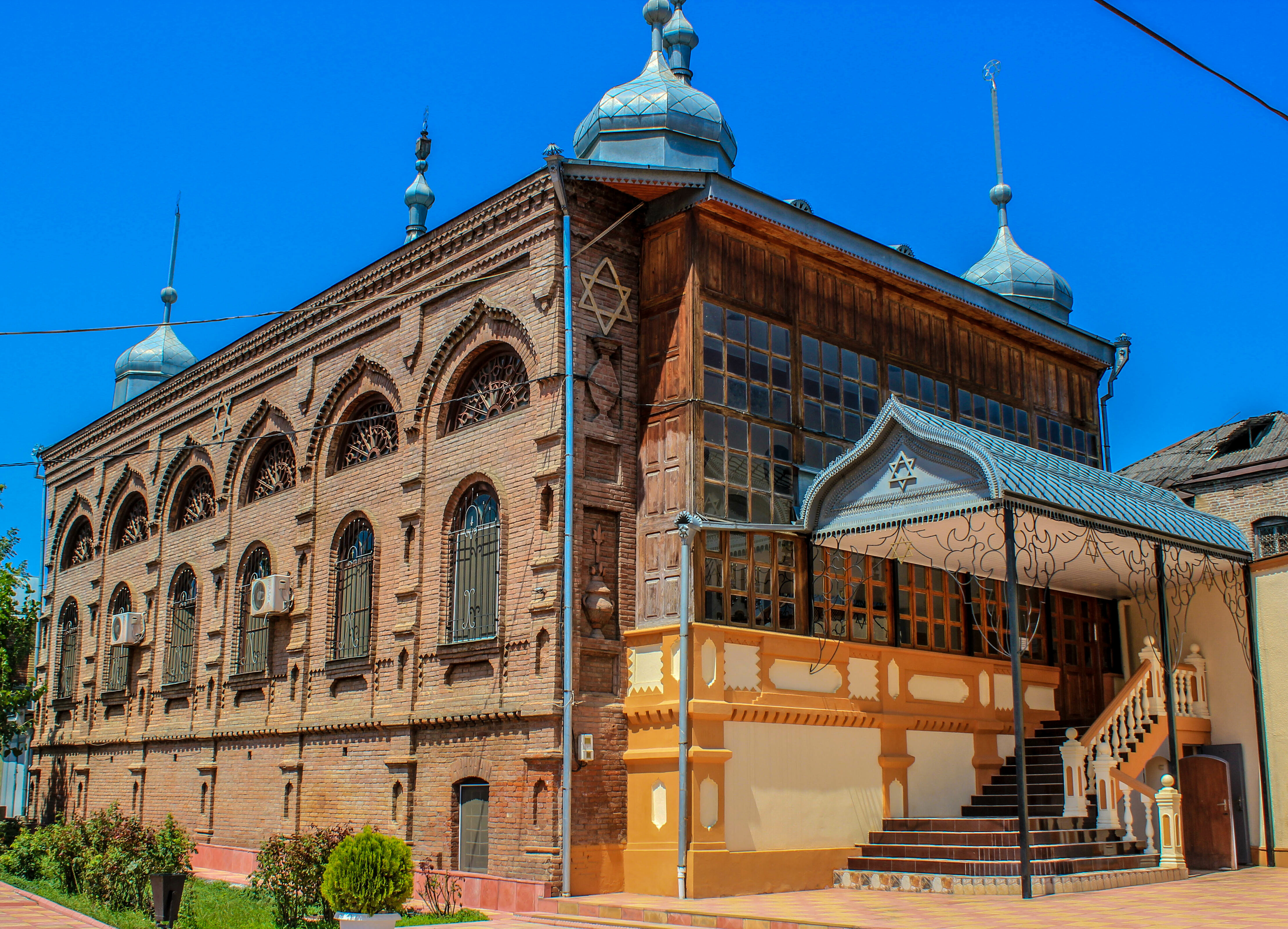
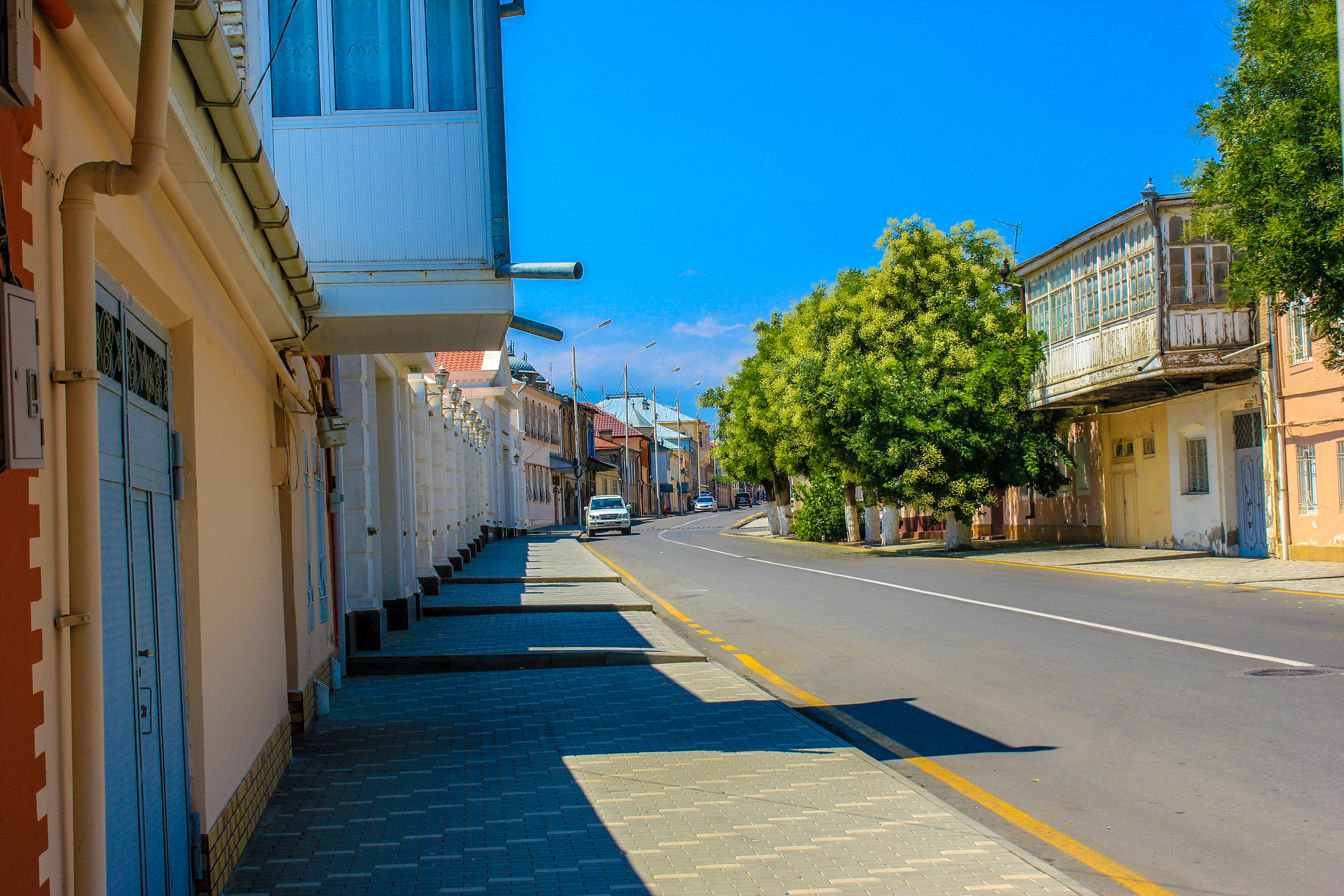

- Location within Azerbaijan
- Coordinates: 41°22′25″N 48°30′38″E
- Country: Azerbaijan
- District: Quba

Population (2010)
  - Total: 3,598
- Time zone: UTC+4:00 (AZT)

Qırmızı Qəsəbə, (Note: Azerbaijani pronunciation: [ɡɯɾmɯˈzɯ ɡæsæˈbæ]), Azerbaijani Cyrillic: Гырмызы Гәсәбә; translated as "Red Town" (Russian: Красная Слобода, romanized: Krasnaya Sloboda; Hebrew: העיר האדומה, ha-'Ir ha-'Adumá, sometimes known in English as either Krasnaya Sloboda or Gyrmyzy Gassaba) also known as Red Village, is a village and municipality in the Quba District of Azerbaijan. As of 2010, it had a population of 3,598, mostly Jews. It is widely believed to be the world's only population centre primarily made up of Jews outside of Israel and the United States, and is likewise considered to be the last surviving shtetl.

Located across the Qudyal river from the city of Quba, it is the principal settlement of Azerbaijan's Caucasus Jewish population; the most widely spoken language in the village is Judeo-Tat.

The names of the municipality in Azerbaijani, Russian, and Hebrew all translate to "Red Town" or "Red Village", supposedly in reference to the red tiles used on the buildings. Other sources attribute the name of Qırmızı Qəsəbə to the protected status that it received during World War II, when its residents were shielded from potential persecution in light of Nazi Germany's invasion of the Soviet Union.

== History ==
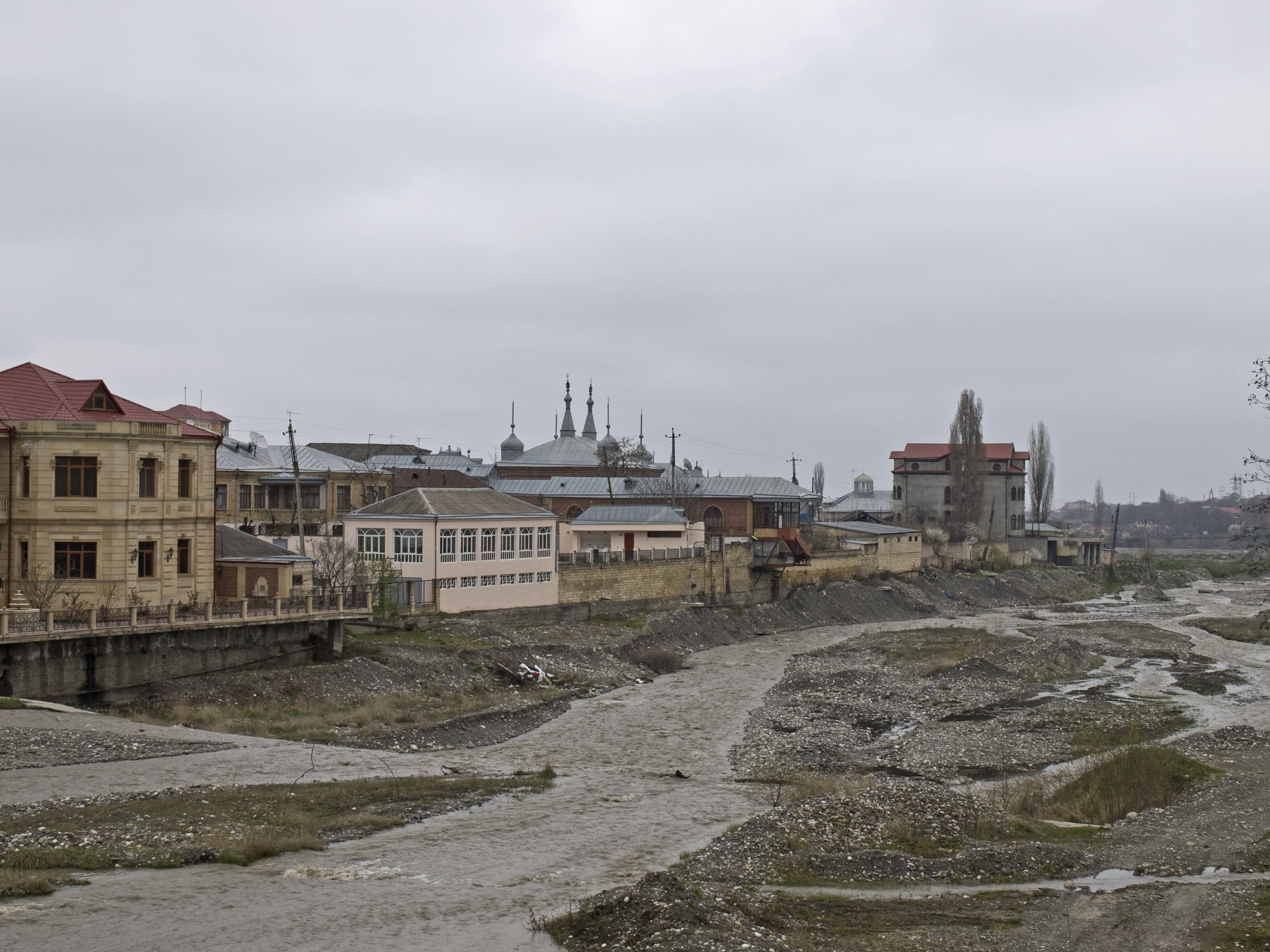
View of Qırmızı Qəsəbə from the bridge

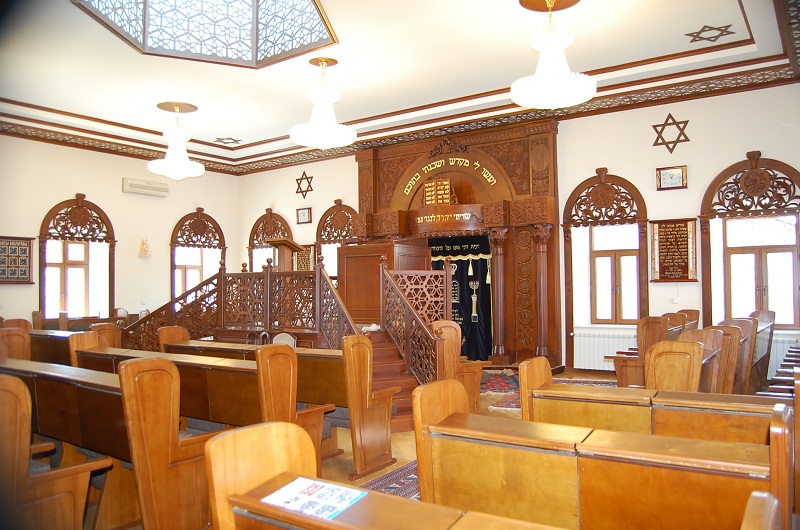
Inside the renovated Giləki (Hilaki) Synagogue

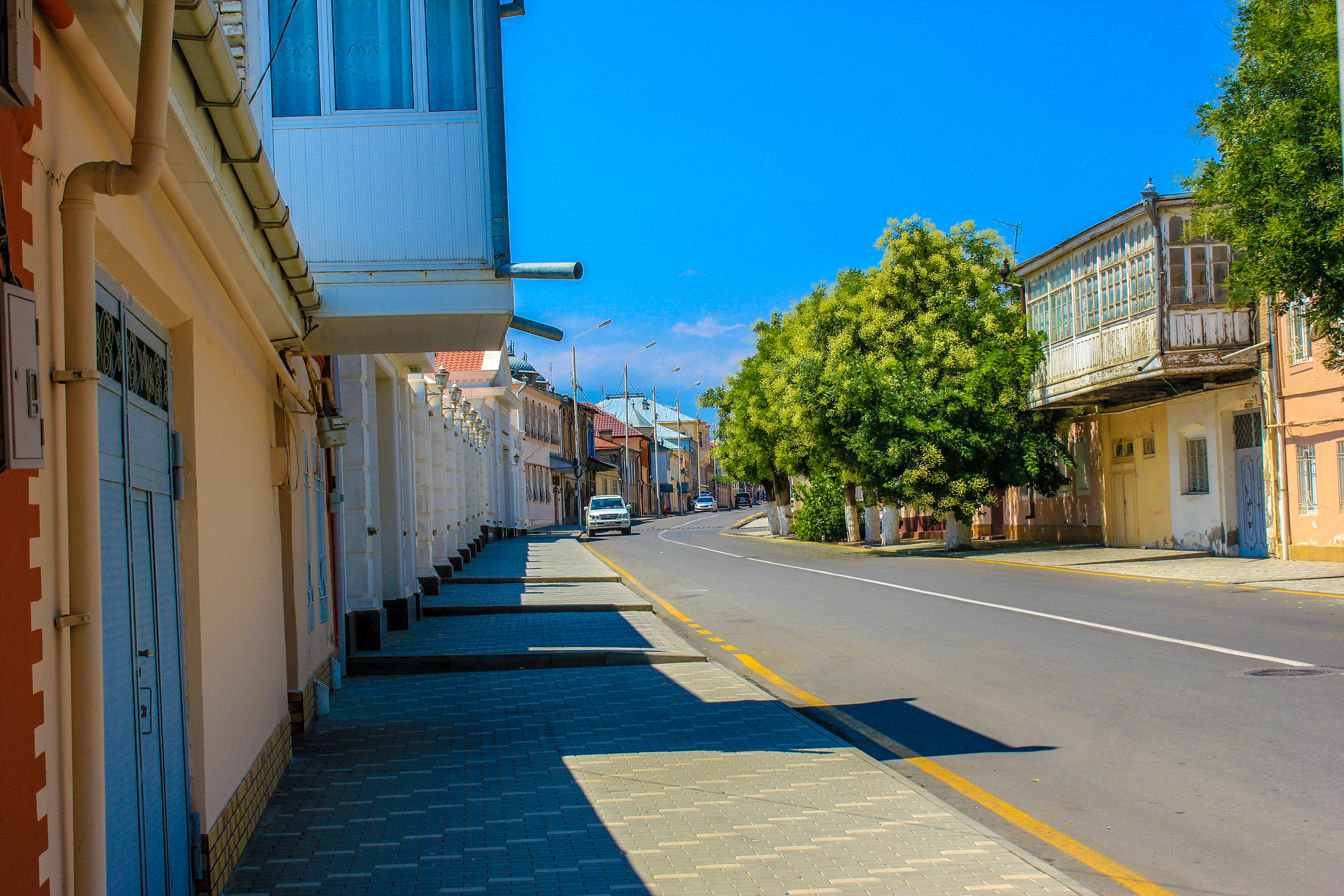
Street in Red Town

=== Jews in Quba and Azerbaijan ===
The first Jewish settlement in the area was named Kulgat and was located on the left bank of the Gudjalchay River, just a few kilometers from present-day Qırmızı Qəsəbə. Old gravestones in the Kulgat area, as well as other evidence that was damaged during the attacks of Nadir Shah in the early 18th century, serve as proof that a Jewish population had been established and lived here.

=== Jewish town across from Quba ===
While Jews from the Azerbaijan highlands had been in the area around Quba since at least the 13th century, the formal creation of Krasnaya Sloboda is traced back to the 18th century. In 1742 the Khan of Quba, Huseynali Khan, gave the Jewish people permission to set up a community free of persecution across the river from the city of Quba. Originally referred to as Yevreyskaya Sloboda "Jewish Settlement", the name was changed to Krasnaya Sloboda "Red Settlement" under Soviet rule.

The massive settlement in the Red Town began in 1731 coinciding with an end to prohibition on Jewish land ownership. After the death of Huseynali Khan in 1758, his son Fatali Khan was the ruler of the Quba Khanate. Fatali Khan, highly appreciating the loyalty, wisdom, and industriousness of the Mountain Jews, allowed them to work in agriculture, trade, and crafts, which was uncommon due to the historic persecution and discrimination Jewish people had faced. The favorable living conditions created for Jews in Quba incentivized the relocation of Jews from other villages, such as Qusar, Uçgün, Şuduq, Griz, and even from Baku, Iran, as well as Turkey and other places, to Quba.

The Jewish people who moved to Qırmızı Qəsəbə had previously lived in nine disparate settlements. Jews from Gilan moved to the settlement in the 1780s. The Gilaki settlement of the Gilani Jews was located in what is now the center of the Red Settlement. People coming from Baku and Quba lived in the settlement of Mizrahi (Hebrew: "East"). Migration from different locations influenced the diversity of employment; for example, Jews moving from mountainous regions were engaged in various agricultural fields, and people who immigrated from Iran were engaged in trade.

Finally, Mountain Jews who escaped attacks and persecutions joined the shelter at Husseynanli Khan in Quba. The Quba Khanate, which developed during the rule of Hussein Khan (1722–1758) and his son Fatali Khan (1758–1789), comprised the northern lands of Azerbaijan to Lankaran.

Since 1722, Mountain Jews have lived in the territory of Gudyalchay. Among Russian Jews, the town once was known as "Little Jerusalem".

The town has had an influx of financial support from residents’ relatives living in Israel, and is the home of a new synagogue, the Bet Knesset. However, after Azerbaijan's independence in 1991, many of the town’s residents migrated to Israel, the United States, and Europe. Due to this, the population dropped from the roughly 18,000 that lived there during the communist era to around 3,500 as of 2025.

== Demographics ==
Initially spread throughout the mountainous region, the Jewish population of the highlands became increasingly centered around Quba.

In 1881, 213,138 Jewish people were officially registered in 34 settlements of the Caucasus. Over the past hundred years, along with Mountain Jews, Jews from other ethnolinguistic groups or those defined by their region of origin also lived in Azerbaijan: Ashkenazi Jews, Krymchaks, Kurdish Jews, and Georgian Jews. However, since the 19th century, the majority of the Jewish population of the republic consists of Mountain Jews.

== Jewish religious practices ==
Two synagogues exist in Qırmızı Qəsəbə: the Six Dome Synagogue which was built in 1888 and renovated in 2000, and Giləki (Hilaki) Synagogue, which was built in 1896 and renovated in the 2010s.

Residents speak in three languages: Judeo-Tat, spoken by Mountain Jews in daily life, Russian and Azerbaijani. One of the two schools here is taught in Azerbaijani or Russian.

== Notable residents ==
- Yevda Abramov (1948–2019) – politician, member of the Parliament of Azerbaijan
- Yakov Agarunov (1907–1992) – poet, playwright
- Zarakh Iliev (born 1966) – billionaire property developer
- Yagutil Mishiev (1927–2024) – publicist
- God Nisanov (born 1972) – billionaire property developer, vice-president of the World Jewish Congress
- German Zakharyayev (born 1971) – businessman, vice-president of the Russian Jewish Congress
- Albert Agarunov (1969–1992) – National Hero of Azerbaijan

== See also ==
- History of the Jews in Azerbaijan
