= Dadashov =

Dadashov, Dadasov or Dadashev (Azerbaijani: Dadaşov, Russian: Дадашев) is an Azerbaijani masculine surname, its feminine counterpart is Dadashova, Dadasova or Dadasheva. It is a patronymic surname used by descendants of people named Dadash. People with this surname include:

- Aydin Dadashov (1952–2016), Azerbaijani film critic, director and academic
- Brilliant Dadashova (born 1959 or 1965), Azerbaijani pop singer
- Ibrahim Dadashov (1926–1990), Azerbaijani wrestler
- Maharram Dadashev (1912–1944), Azerbaijani soldier
- Malik Dadashov (1924–1996), Azerbaijani actor
- Manuvakh Dadashev (1913–1943), Soviet Jewish poet
- Maxim Dadashev (1990–2019), Russian boxer
- Mikhail Dadashev (born 1936), Soviet and Russian Jewish writer
- Milana Dadasheva (born 1995), Russian freestyle wrestler
- Mukhtar Dadashov (1913–1998), Soviet Azerbaijani actor, director and screenwriter
- Murad Dadashov (born 1978), Azerbaijani TV host, producer and actor
- Renat Dadaşov (born 1999), Azerbaijan national team footballer
- Rufat Dadashov (born 1991), Azerbaijani football striker
- Sadig Dadashov (1905–1946), Azerbaijani architect and architecture historian
