= Mishi Bakhshiev =

Soviet poet (1910–1972)

Mishi Yusupovich Bakhshiev
- Born: November 7, 1910; Derbent, Dagestan ASSR, USSR
- Died: September 7, 1972 (aged 61); Makhachkala, Dagestan, USSR
- Occupations: writer, poet

Mishi Yusupovich Bakhshiev (Note: Sometimes Russified as Mikhail Yusupovich Bakhshiev (Russian: Михаил Юсупович Бахшиев)) (Russian: Миши Юсупович Бахшиев; Hebrew: מישי בחשייב; born Novemerb 7, 1910 – September 7, 1972) was a Soviet writer and poet of Mountain Jew origin. (Note: Great Soviet Encyclopedia indicates he was ethnically Tat, not Jewish. His military documents also indicate Tat nationality.) He wrote in languages of the Mountain Jews (Juhuri) and Russian.

== Biography ==
Bakhshiev was born in 1910, in the Southern Russian city of Derbent. In 1928 he was sent to study in Krasnodar, and then to Moscow. In 1936 he graduated from the State University of Farming. During the World War II, he was a war correspondent. He held various party positions, worked in leading positions in the newspaper "Dagestankaya Pravda".

In 1932, Bakhshiev wrote his first story "Towards a New Life." In 1933–1940 he wrote several collections of poems ("Komsomol", "Fruits of October"), novels (Juhuri:Э пушорехьи тозе зиндегуни) – "Towards a New Life", (Juhuri:Vetegechiho) – "Fishermen" and dramas (Juhuri:Бесгуни игидхо) – "Victory of the Hero", (Juhuri:Хори) – "Earth", as well as the musical comedy (Juhuri:Шох угли, шох Аббас ва-хомбол Хасан) – "Shah's son, Shah Abbas and the loader Hasan". In the postwar years, Bakhshiyev wrote a collection of poems (Juhuri:Ме хосденуьм васале) – "I love spring", which was published only after the death of the author. In 1962–1963 he wrote in (Juhuri:Хушахой онгур) – "A Bunch of Grapes", it was the first novel in the Mountain Jewish literature. Bakhshiev was also involved in translations from Russian into Juhuri. He translated Alexander Pushkin, Mikhail Lermontov and Nizami Ganjavi. He died in Makhachkala on September 7, 1972.

Some works of prose he wrote in Russian ("Stories about my fellow countrymen", 1956; "Common people", 1958; "Gardens will rustle", 1962, etc.) Bakhshiev's last play was Juhuri:Дю дедей) – "Two Mothers", 1965.

== See also ==
- Judeo-Tat literature
