= Dadash =

Daaash may refer to:بنبنص

- Dadash (given name)
- Dadash Kandi, a village in Iran
- Sari Kand-e Dadash Beyk, a village in Iran
