= Matatov =

Matatov, feminine: Matatova is a patronymic surname found among Bukharan Jews and Mountain Jews, constructed from the Given name Matat with Russian patronymic suffix -ov. Notable people with the surname include:

- Bikel Matatova (1928–2013), mountain-Jewish Dagestani and Israeli actress
- Ekhiil Matatov (1888–1943), mountain-Jewish poet
- Rinat Matatov, Israeli actress
