= Yuno Avshalumov =

Soviet composer, conductor, and teacher (1934-1981)

- Юно Авшалумов
- Born: 22 September 1934; Derbent, Dagestan ASSR, Soviet Union
- Died: 2 December 1981 (aged 47); Makhachkala, Dagestan ASSR, Soviet Union
- Occupations: composer, conductor, teacher
- Works: Unknown Soldier, Your Braids, At the Spring, Lullaby
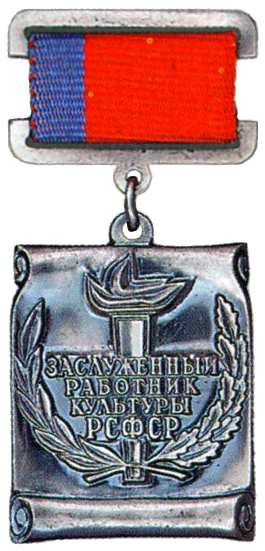
- Awards

Yuno Zakharyevich Avshalumov (Russian: Юно Захарьевич Авшалумов; Hebrew: יונו אבשלומוב; 1934–1981) was a Soviet composer, conductor, and teacher of Mountain Jewish descent. In recognition of his contributions to Soviet culture, he was honored with the titles of "Honored Worker of Culture of the Dagestan ASSR" (1967) and "Honoured Cultural Worker of the RSFSR" (1981).

== Biography ==
Yuno Avshalumov was born in Derbent, Dagestan ASSR, into the family of Zakharyo Avshalumov, the director of the Judeo-Tat Theatre.

When the Great Patriotic War began, Yuno Avshalumov was seven years old. His house grew quiet and empty as his father and friends left for the front. Life became very difficult. In Derbent, as in the rest of the country, hunger prevailed.

Zakharyo Avshalumov, Yuno Avshalumov's father, died during the war.

Despite the hardships of war and famine, Yuno Avshalumov dreamed of learning to play a musical instrument. In 1943, his mother sent him to study under the talented clarinetist Mukhoil, who taught him to play the tar.

In 1952, he enrolled in the Makhachkala Music College, specializing in choral singing and conducting. During his third year, Yuno Avshalumov was called up for service in the Soviet Army, where he served in a musical platoon and led an amateur choir.

In 1958, he was awarded the Honorary Diploma of the Presidium of the Supreme Soviet of the RSFSR for his participation in a concert dedicated to the 30th anniversary of the Armed Forces of the USSR. After completing his military service, Yuno Avshalumov resumed his studies and graduated from the music school with honors in 1959. That same year, he enrolled at the Baku Academy of Music named after Uzeyir Hajibeyov, where he began composing music professionally for the first time.

In 1964, Yuno Avshalumov graduated from the academy with honors.

Having returned to Derbent after completing his studies, Yuno Avshalumov becomes the head of a music school. There, he forms and personally directs a children's choir.

In 1967, he was awarded the title of "Honored Worker of Culture of the Dagestan ASSR."

In 1970, at the invitation of the Ministry of Culture of Dagestan, Yuno Avshalumov moved to Makhachkala and began teaching at the Makhachkala Music College named after Gotfrid Hasanov.

In 1974, Yuno Avshalumov was appointed conductor of the State Television and Radio Broadcasting Committee Choir of Dagestan. He composed music for the ensemble using poetry by Dagestani poets.

He wrote a romance based on Hizgil Avshalumov's poem Your Braids (Judeo-Tat: Бендгьой муйтуь) and, during the same period, radio listeners and television audiences heard his songs At the Spring (Judeo-Tat: Э ён билогъ) and Lullaby (Judeo-Tat: Ненуй-ненем).

Avshalumov also set Zoya Semenduyeva’s poem Unknown Soldier (Judeo-Tat: МэгIлуьмсуьзе солдат) to music. The Dagestan Television and Radio Choir frequently performed this piece on air, with soloist Migir Rabaev.

Throughout his career, Yuno Avshalumov composed many other songs, leaving a lasting impact on Dagestani music.

In 1981, Yuno Avshalumov was awarded the honorary title of "Honored Worker of Culture of the RSFSR."

On December 2, 1981, at the age of 47, Yuno Avshalumov died after a prolonged illness. He was buried in the city of Makhachkala.

== Family ==
In 1959, Yuno Avshalumov married a woman from Derbent, Hanna Lazarevna Leshkarieva, and they had three children: Galina, Zakhar, and Svetlana.

After Yuno Avshalumov's death, his wife, Hanna Lazarevna, along with their two children, Galina and Zakhar, emigrated to Israel.

Rina Avshalumova, the granddaughter of Yuno Avshalumov and daughter of Svetlana, is a Russian pop singer.

== Awards ==
- 1967, Honored Worker of Culture of the Dagestan ASSR
- 1981, Honoured Cultural Worker of the RSFSR

== Literature ==
- Mikhailova, Irina (2014). Самородки Дагестана [Gifted of Dagestan] (in Russian). Makhachkala. Russia. pp. 43–46.
