= Manuvakh Dadashev =

Soviet poet (1913–1943)

Manuvakh Mardakhaevich Dadashev
- Manuvakh Dadashev
- Born: 1913; Derbent, Dagestan Oblast, Russian Empire
- Died: 1943 (aged 29–30); Luhansk, Ukraine
- Occupation: Poet
- Writing career

Manuvakh Dadashev (Russian: Манувах Мардахаевич Дадашев; Hebrew: מנובך דדשב; 1913–1943) was a Soviet poet of Mountain Jew origin. He wrote in a language of the Mountain Jew (Juhuri).

== Biography ==
Manuvakh Dadashev was born into a poor family in the city of Derbent in 1913. He worked for the newspaper The Toiler, first as a distributor of letters, and then as a literary worker. In the same newspaper, he published his first poems.

Dadashev studied at universities in Baku and Moscow. He worked in Makhachkala at the institute. Collected and translated into Russian the folklore of the peoples of the Caucasus. He translated Russian poets into the language of Mountain Jews. Among the unfinished translations was "Eugene Onegin" by Alexander Pushkin, on which he worked before the beginning of the World War II.

When World War II began, Dadashev went to the front as a volunteer. During the war, he continued to write poems and stories, which were published in the newspaper Dagestankaya Pravda. In 1943, in a battle near Luhansk, senior lieutenant Dadashev was seriously wounded and soon died of his wounds. He was buried in Lugansk in a mass grave in the park named after "May 9". Dadashev was awarded medals: "For Courage" and "For the Defence of Stalingrad".

Dadashev's poems were published in the Anthology of Mountain Jews poets, Fruits of October, and Judeo-Tat almanac. Dadashev dedicated his poem (Juhuri:Du komz) – "Two letters" to female emancipation.

In 1969, the Dagestan Book Publishing House posthumously published a book of poems. The Flame of October.

== Awards ==
- Medal "For Courage" (Russia)
- Medal "For the Defence of Stalingrad"
