= Mikhail Borisovich Gavrilov =

Soviet writer and poet (1926–2014)

- Born: 29 December 1926; Derbent, Dagestan ASSR, USSR
- Died: 18 July 2014 (aged 87); Derbent, Dagestan, Russia
- Occupations: writer, poet
- Writing career
- Genres: prose, poetry

Mikhail Gavrilov (Russian: Гаврилов Михаил Борисович; Hebrew: מיכאיל גברילוב; born 29 December 1926 – 18 July 2014) was a Soviet writer and poet of Mountain Jew descent. He wrote in Judeo-Tat and Russian. In recognition of his many years of work and significant contributions to the field of culture, Mikhail Gavrilov was awarded the honorary title of Honored Worker of Culture of the Republic of Dagestan in July 2009.

== Biography ==
Gavrilov was born in the city Derbent, Dagestan ASSR, USSR. His father Boris Gavrilov (1908–1990) was a poet and dramatist.

Since the beginning of the World War II, Gavrilov worked as a locksmith's apprentice, a 4-grade locksmith, then a 4-grade turner at the Derbent cannery. In 1944 he voluntarily joined the Red Army. After Gavrilov graduated from the school of junior aviation specialists, he served as a fighter armament master in the 26th reserve aviation regiment, then in the 117th Guards Fighter Aviation Regiment, he supported the Yak-3 fighter. He was demobilized from the army in February 1947.

Gavrilov completed the distance education courses at the Derbent Pedagogical School, after which he switched to teaching. In 1970 he graduated from the distance learning department of the history faculty of the Dagestan State University. For 45 years of teaching activity, Gavrilov published a school curriculum for the Judeo-Tat language, prescriptions and a program of optional classes, trained teachers in his native language.

The first publications of Gavrilov date back to 1949–1950. He published in periodicals, in the almanac (Juhuri:Ватан Советиму) – "The Soviet Motherland" in the Judeo-Tat language, stories, the poem (Juhuri:Гhард ферзенди) – "Filial duty", as well as collections of poems in Judeo-Tat and in Russian.

During the Perestroika period, when national schools began to revive, Gavrilov prepared and published textbooks in Judeo-Tat language for grades 1–4, curricula and copybooks. He taught courses for the training of teachers of the Judeo-Tat language.

From 1986 to 1990 Gavrilov was the director of the Judeo-Tat theatre. Since 1990, he was the executive secretary of the Judeo-Tat's insert in the city newspaper (Russian: Знамя коммунизма) – "Communism banner", and since 1991 he worked as the editor of the republican newspaper Vatan.

From 1993 to 2004 he lived in Israel; organized the publication of the (Russian: Кавказская газета) – "Caucasian Newspaper", was its first editor-in-chief, as well as the chairman of the Mountain Jewish section of the Writers' Union of Israel, edited books published in the Judeo-Tat language.

In 2004 he with his family moved back to live in Derbent. He started to work as an editor of the department of the republican newspaper Vatan.

Mikhail Gavrilov's son, Semyon Gavrilov, is also a poet.

== Awards ==
- Honored Worker of Culture of the Republic of Dagestan (July 2009) – for many years of work and high achievements in the field of culture.
