= Boris Gavrilov (writer) =

Soviet writer, poet and dramatist

- Born: Boris Gavrilovich Gavrilov; 1908; Derbent, Dagestan Oblast, Russian Empire
- Died: 1990 (aged 81–82); Derbent, Dagestan ASSR, USSR
- Occupations: poet, dramatist
- Writing career
- Genres: prose, poetry

Boris Gavrilovich Gavrilov (Russian: Boris Gavrilovich Gavrilov; Hebrew: בוריס גברילוב; born 1908 – 1990) was a Soviet writer, poet, dramatist and teacher of Mountain Jew origin. He wrote in a language of the Mountain Jews (Juhuri). He was the founder of the Mountain Jews school. He was a compiler of the first grammar, textbooks and dictionary in Judeo-Tat.

== Biography ==
Gavrilov was born into a working-class family. From 1915 he studied at the yeshiva. In 1917 he started to study at a Russian school. In 1926 Gavrilov entered the Peter the Great St. Petersburg Polytechnic University, but was expelled after a few months due to anonymous letters. It reported that he was the son of a kulak. In the spring of 1927 he moved to Madzhalis, Kaytagsky District, where he created a school for the Mountain Jews. There Gavrilov together with his wife Olga taught until 1930, then he was transferred to Derbent to the first Mountain Jewish school, named after Aron Ehrlich. While working at the school, he graduated from the Pedagogical College in Derbent. He had taken a distance education.
In the 1930s, he wrote the grammar, phonetics and morphology for the Judeo-Tat language, which were published in 1940–1941. From 1930 he was also a correspondent for the first Mountain Jews newspaper The Toiler.

From the first days of the World War II, Gavrilov volunteered for the front; he demobilized from the army at the end of 1946, returned to Derbent. Until 1947, Gavrilov worked as director of the Mountain Jews school in Derbent that named after Lazar Kaganovich. In 1989, after the revival of national schools, Gavrilov prepared an alphabet book in Judeo-Tat for the first grade, which was published in 1990, as well as the "Judeo-Tat – Russian, Russian – Judeo-Tat dictionary."

In the late 1920s Gavrilov published his first poems in the newspaper (Juhuri:Захметкеш) – "The Toiler". In the 1930s the newspaper published his poetry and short stories. Since the end of the 1920s, he collected folklores of the Mountain Jews of the Kaytagsky District. In Madzhalis he found a folk material for his poem "Heydar and Maral". In 1938 Gavrilov prepared and published an "Alphabet", "Grammar of the Judeo-Tat language" and "Spelling dictionary of the Judeo-Tat language". Gavrilov's alphabet was adopted as the basis for the Judeo-Tat literature. Gavrilov published his poems, stories, plays and translations into the Mountain Jews almanac (Juhuri:Ватан Советиму) – "Our Soviet Motherland". In 1980 published three collections of poetry "Anthology of the Judeo-Tat poetry". Hizgil Avshalumov, people's writer of Dagestan wrote to a preface to the collection of poems by Boris Gavrilov:

"In the poetry of Boris Gavrilov, the reader can feel his poetic inspiration, his excellent command of his native language ... In poetry, he showed outstanding abilities."

Boris Gavrilov’s son, Mikhail Gavrilov (1926–2014), was a writer and poet. His grandson, Semyon Gavrilov, is also a poet.

== Selected works ==
- Peri-Khanum (drama, 1932) – staged at the Mountain Jews State Theater (Derbent) in 1938, it was in the repertoire until 1990.
