= Ekhiil Matatov =

Soviet Dagestani politician and Judeo-Tat writer (1888–1943)

- Ехиил Мататов

People's Commissar of Justice, and Secretary of the Presidium of the Central Executive Committee of the Dagestan ASSR
- In office 1931 – July 1938

Secretary of the Presidium of the Supreme Soviet of the Dagestan ASSR
- In office July 1938 – October 1938

Personal details
- Born: Ekhiil Ruvinovich Matatov; 1888 Derbent, Dagestan Oblast, Caucasus Viceroyalty
- Died: 1943 (aged 54–55) Komi ASSR, Russian SFSR, Soviet Union
- Party: Communist Party of the Soviet Union (from 1918)
- Spouse: Susanna Khanukaeva

Ekhiil Ruvinovich Matatov (Russian: Ехиил Рувинович Мататов, Hebrew: אחייל מטטוב; 1888–1943) was a Soviet Dagestani politician and Judeo-Tat writer. He served as the Prosecutor of the Dagestan ASSR (1931 - ?), People's Commissar of Justice, and Secretary of the Presidium of the Central Executive Committee of the Dagestan ASSR. He was also the founder of the world's first Judeo-Tat newspaper, The Toiler (Judeo-Tat: Захметкеш). Matatov was repressed in 1938.

== Biography ==
Ekhiil Matatov was born in 1888 in Derbent and came from the wealthy Khanukayev family, one of the three richest families in Dagestan before the October Revolution. He served in the army from 1908 to 1910. In 1914, he went to the front and was captured by Austria-Hungary a year later, where he spent three years until 1917.

At the beginning of World War I, he was drafted into the army. He was a revolutionary and met with Vladimir Lenin. In 1917, he was the only Dagestani to capture the Winter Palace. In 1918, he joined the Bolshevik Party. From March 8 to 16, 1921, he was a delegate to the 10th Congress of the Russian Communist Party.

He married Susanna Khanukaeva, and they had three daughters, Iskra, Tosya, Shura, and a son, Mikhail.

In June 1928, he founded the newspaper The Toiler (Judeo-Tat: Захметкеш), with former rabbi Asail Binayev appointed as editor. The publication became the first Judeo-Tat republican newspaper in the world. Ekhiil Matatov was instrumental in having the Juhuri language recognized as the state language of Dagestan in the 1920s.

On 10 June 1930, Matatov delivered the main address at a meeting of the Dagestan OZET commission in Makhachkala. In 1931, he became the prosecutor of Dagestan, after which he was appointed the People's Commissar of Justice of Dagestan. Until July 1938, he served as the secretary of the Presidium of the Central Executive Committee of the Dagestan ASSR. Subsequently, he became the secretary of the Presidium of the Supreme Council of the Dagestan ASSR until October 1938.

In 1932, under Matatov's editorship, the "Political Dictionary" and the collection "Mountain Jews Poets" were published.

In October 1938, the Soviet government arrested Matatov, accused him of bourgeois nationalism, and sentenced him to eight or 10 years imprisonment.

According to the memoirs of Abdul Vagabov:

Among those transported from Makhachkala were Magomed Dalgat, Ekhiil Matatov, Khandadash Tagiev, and others… The carriages were packed with people like sardines in a barrel. The specially equipped carriages heated up so much during the day that it was impossible to breathe, there was not enough air. People in the carriages shouted: 'We are dying, give us water!' People were dying, but they did not give us water...

After the start of World War II, while in a Soviet correctional labour camp in the Komi Republic, he asked to go to the front but was not allowed until 1943. He died in 1943.

== Family ==
=== Brother ===
- Khananya

=== Spouse ===
- Susanna Khanukaeva

=== Children ===
- Daughter Iskra: Worked in a pharmacy in Makhachkala
- Daughter Tosya
- Daughter Shura: Chief winemaker at the Makhachkala winery
- Son Mikhail (born November 23, 1914, in Derbent): Engineer, public figure, co-author of the collection "Tat-Judaists" (Moscow, 1993), lived and worked in Moscow

=== Grandson ===
- Lazar Abramov

== Legacy ==
- Ekhiil Matatov lived at 17 Kandelaki Street in Derbent. In 2022, his house, built in 1898, was recognized as a cultural heritage site of Derbent and placed under state protection under the name "Matatov's Residential House".
- A monument to Ekhiil Ruvinovich Matatov was erected in Derbent.

== Publications ==
- Orthographic Dictionary-Reference Book of the Judeo-Tat Language (Makhachkala, 1929)
- Guide to the Judeo-Tat Language (Makhachkala, 1931)
