= Daniil Atnilov =

Soviet poet and writer (1913–1968)

Daniil Atnilovich Atnilov
- Born: 1913; Derbent, Dagestan ASSR, USSR
- Died: 1968 (aged 54–55); Moscow, USSR
- Occupation: poet

Daniil Atnilov (Russian: Даниил Атнилович Атнилов; Hebrew: דניאל אטנילוב; born 1913 – 1968) was a Soviet poet of Mountain Jew origin. He wrote in a language of the Mountain Jew (Juhuri). He was a USSR Union of Writers member.

== Biography ==
He was born in 1913, in Derbent, in the Republic of Dagestan ASSR, USSR. He received his secondary education in 1933–1936 at an editorial and publishing college in Moscow. He worked in the Dagestan Book Publishing House as the editor of the Mountain Jews department. In June 1941 he graduated from the philological faculty of the Dagestan Pedagogical Institute.

Daniil Atnilov was in the World War II: at first he was a scout, and after being wounded he became a war correspondent. Atnilov's first works of the war years reflected the patriotic feelings of the Soviet people in connection with the sudden outbreak of war. The poem "At Dawn in June", created at the beginning of the war. It is full of sincere emotion and calls to Soviet people to stand up for the country.

"Hurry my brothers Brave sons of my Motherland!
We were attacked by the Nazis
Like bandits.
Their plans will never come true!
Let's destroy the fascists!
Our cause is right
And the sun gives us strength."

After the end of the war, Atnilov worked for a newspaper in Makhachkala. From the early 1950s he lived in Moscow.

The first poems of Atnilov were published in the early 1930s in the Derbent newspaper The Toiler. In the second half of the 1930s, he took an active part in the publication of Mountain Jews’ educational and fiction literature. His poems were included in the first Mountain Jews literary almanac that was compiled by him. Atnilov was engaged in the translation of the classics of Russian poetry into the Judeo-Tat language. He translated Mikhail Lermontov, Alexander Pushkin and Samuil Marshak. After the war, he was actively involved in the processing and publication of the Mountain Jewish folklore and literature, while continued to write poetry at the same time. In 1948 was published his first poetry collection "Waves of the Heart". Soon after that Atnilov published new collections of poems "Light Traits", "Image of Time", "Faithful Star", "Flowers of Humanity" and others. Atnilov also wrote a lot of the children's books like "First lesson", "I like these children very much" and "Boy Nakhshun and his friends."

After his death in 1968 was published his collection (Juhuri:Гуьлгьой инсони) – "Flowers of Humanity".

In 1949, Daniil Atnilov became member of the USSR Union of Writers.
