= Asaf Pinkhasov =

- Асаф Пинхасов
- Born: 1884; Derbent, Dagestan Oblast, Russian Empire
- Died: March 1920 (aged 36); Derbent, Dagestan Oblast, Russian Federation
- Occupations: educator, scholar, translator, rabbi

Asaf Yutamovich Pinkhasov (Russian: Пинхасов, Асаф Ютамович; Hebrew: אסף פינחסוב; 1884–1920) was a Mountain Jewish educator, scholar, translator, and rabbi. He was one of the founders of the Judeo-Tat script, the creator of the first Judeo-Tat alphabet, and the pioneer of the Judeo-Tat literary language.

In the Judeo-Tat language, he published translations of the Siddur (Vilnius, 1909; with parallel Hebrew text) and Joseph Sapir's brochure, The Goals of the Zionists (Vilnius, 1908). In 1917, he established the Jewish National Committee. He was executed by the Bolsheviks in 1920.

== Biography ==
Asaf Pinkhasov was born in 1884 in Derbent into a rabbi's family. He studied under the Chief Rabbi of Dagestan, Yaakov Yitzhaki, who was renowned throughout the Caucasus. Proficient in Russian and fluent in Hebrew, he was invited—on the recommendation of his teacher—to serve as a home tutor for the family of Matvey (Matitiyahu) Bogatyrev, a wealthy Mountain Jewish businessman in Grozny.

In 1908, Pinkhasov graduated from the Jewish Theological Seminary (Yeshiva) in Vilnius. A year later, he traveled to Samarkand, where he established a Russian-Jewish school for the children of Caucasian Jews and taught there for about two years.

Upon returning to Derbent, Pinkhasov submitted a petition to the military governor of the Dagestan region in early January 1911, seeking permission to open a Russian-Jewish printing house in his hometown. However, the printing house was never established.

That same year, he applied for the position of Public (Chief) Rabbi of Derbent but did not receive the required number of votes, as he was considered too young for the role at just 27 years old. In 1911, he married Susanna Ilyaguevna Pinkhasova and continued his teaching and social activities. He also prepared two books for publication, translated from Hebrew, using the alphabet he had developed.

Pinkhasov's earliest publications not only laid the foundation for the written Judeo-Tat language but also contributed significantly to linguistic research. He established the Judeo-Tat literary language based on the Derbent dialect, incorporating select lexemes from the Quba (Guba) and Kaitag dialects while expanding the preserved ancient Hebrew layer of the language. Pinkhasov's work played a pivotal role in shaping the future development of the Judeo-Tat literary language.

By 1917, he became the leader of the Mountain Jews of Derbent. He translated the Siddur (Judeo-Tat: Гъуьл тефило) from Hebrew into the Judeo-Tat language. At the same time, he taught at the first Russian-Jewish school in Dagestan.

In the spring of 1917, Turkic, Armenian, Jewish, and Russian national committees began operating in Derbent. Each committee soon established a small armed detachment. Asaf Pinkhasov was elected Chairman of the Jewish National Committee, and the previously formed Zionist group joined this committee.

During the existence of the Mountainous Republic of the Northern Caucasus, Mountain Jews were elected to the Derbent City Duma, including A. Pinkhasov, Khanukaev, B. Musakhalov, and Ya. Dadashev. Asaf Pinkhasov also played a role in the liberation of 28 Jewish youths captured by Denikin’s forces, who faced the threat of execution.

After the end of the Russian Civil War and the restoration of Soviet power, all national committees in Derbent were declared illegal, and their leaders were arrested and convicted of aiding counterrevolutionaries.

Shortly after Soviet power was established in Derbent in late April to early May 1918, the city's Council of People's Commissars issued a decision on May 11, 1918:

“In view of the appropriation of the functions of Soviet power by the National Committees, immediate measures must be taken to abolish them.” (News of the Revolutionary Defense of the City of Derbent, May 19 (May 3), 1918, No. 19, p. 4).

All the committee chairmen were sentenced to death. They all filed an appeal to the Military Tribunal of the Dagestan Region for a review of the sentence. However, before receiving a response from the central authorities, the sentence was carried out only against Asaf Pinkhasov.

In March 1920, at the age of 36, Asaf Pinkhasov was executed by the Chekists.

== Family ==
- Spouse — Susanna Ilyaguevna Pinkhasova (née Khanukaeva), born in 1899. She graduated from a pedagogical college and worked as a teacher. After her husband was shot, she took her three children and left the Dagestan ASSR. She died in 1957.
- Son — Emmanuil Asafyevich Pinkhasov (1912–1993) was an engineer, participant in the Great Patriotic War, died in Chelyabinsk.
