= Qudyal =

River in Azerbaijan

Qudyalchay
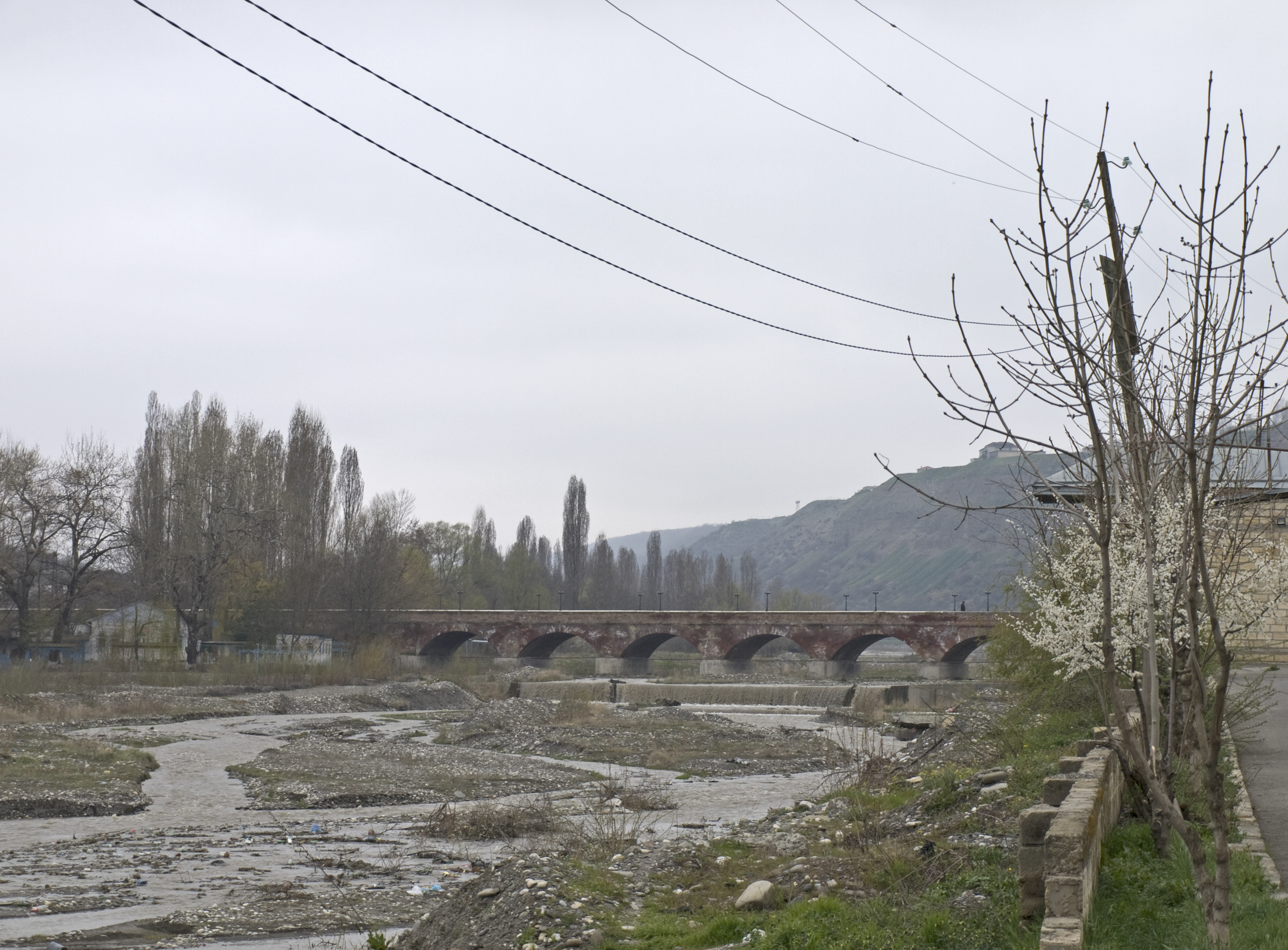
- The arch bridge over the Qudyalchay connecting Quba (left) and Qırmızı Qəsəbə (right)
- Native name: Qudyalçay (Azerbaijani)

Location
- Country: Azerbaijan

Physical characteristics
- Source: Greater Caucasus
  - coordinates: 41.2616°N 48.3236°E
  - elevation: 3,000 m (9,800 ft)
- Mouth: Caspian Sea
  - location: Niyazoba
  - coordinates: 41.5239°N 48.9408°E
  - elevation: -30 m (98 ft)
- Length: 108 km (67 mi)
- Basin size: 799 km^{2} (308 sq mi)

The Qudyal or Qudyalchay (Azerbaijani: Qudyalçay) is a river in north-eastern Azerbaijan. It flows through the districts of Quba and Khachmaz.

== Overview ==
The Qudyal starts at the northern slope of Tufan Dagh in Greater Caucasus, at 3,000 meters above sea level in Quba District. The river ends its stream by flowing into the Caspian Sea through Khachmaz District.

The water from the Qudyal is used for irrigation purposes and some of the water also flows into the Samur–Absheron channel.

== Statistics ==
The length of the Qudyalchay is 108 km and the basin size is 799 km^{2}. Average annual water consumption is 6,85 cubic meters per second.

The river is mostly fed by snow (50%), groundwater (32%) and rain (18%). From April to July, the river floods due to melting of the snow and increase in water.
