= Yakov Agarunov =

Soviet poet (1907–1992)

Yakov Mikhailovich Agarunov
- Yakov Agarunov
- Born: 25 April 1907; Qırmızı Qəsəbə, Kuba Uyezd, Baku Governorate, Russian Empire
- Died: 31 May 1992 (aged 85); Baku, Azerbaijan
- Occupations: Poet; playwright; translator
- Writing career
- Genres: Poetry; dramaturgy

Yakov Mikhailovich Agarunov (Russian: Агарунов Яков Михайлович; Hebrew: יעקב אגארונוב; 25 April 1907 – 31 May 1992) was a Mountain Jew poet, playwright, political and public figure of Azerbaijan, author of the new Judeo-Tat alphabet. He wrote in Judeo-Tat.

== Biography ==
Agarunov was born into the family of a gardener. He studied at a traditional Jewish school from 1915 to 1919, and at the same time attended a Russian school.

In 1920, he became a Komsomol activist and took part in an amateur drama club. From 1924 to 1925, he translated Uzeyir Hajibeyov's play "Arshin Mal Alan" from Azerbaijani into Judeo-Tat.

From 1925 to 1928, Agarunov studied at the rabfak in Moscow and Baku. He graduated from the history department of the Baku Pedagogical Institute and the Higher Party School under the Central Committee of the All-Union Communist Party of Bolsheviks.

In 1932, he started to work in the apparatus of the Central Committee of the Communist Party of Azerbaijan. From 1934 to 1938, Agarunov was the editor of the republican newspaper "Communist" (Russian: Коммунист) in the Judeo-Tat language; at the same time he worked as deputy director of the State Azerbaijan State Publishing House (he oversaw the publication of all books in Judeo-Tat).

In 1937, Agarunov was elected a candidate member of the Communist Party of Azerbaijan. From 1938, he worked as First Secretary of the Ordzhonikidzevsky District Party Committee. Agarunov was awarded the Order of the Red Banner of Labour. In 1939 he became a member of the Communist Party of Azerbaijan.

In 1941, he worked as the secretary of the Baku City Committee for the Oil Industry. For exemplary fulfillment of the government's assignment, Agarunov was awarded the Order of the Badge of Honour.

In the fall of 1942, Agarunov was sent to develop virgin oil in the Kuibyshev region, and was appointed secretary of the Kuibyshev regional committee of the CPSU for the oil industry. For exemplary fulfillment of the task of the Party and government in wartime, Agarunov was awarded the Order of Lenin.

From 1947 to 1950, Agarunov worked as the secretary of the Baku City Party Committee.

From 1963 to 1971, Agarunov worked as deputy director of the All-Union Scientific Research Institute for Oil Industry Safety.

After retirement, Agarunov continued to engage in public and journalistic activities, and was a member of the Committee for the Revolutionary Glory of the Republic of Azerbaijan.

Agarunov stood at the origins of Judeo-Tat literature. Using the poetics of folklore, he tried to fill his works with actualities, in the spirit of official policy and public content.

He led a group of compilers of the Judeo-Tat alphabet based on Latin that was adopted at the Second All-Union Conference on Cultural Building among Mountain Jews (April 1929, Baku).

He compiled the Judeo-Tat–Russian and Russian–Judeo-Tat dictionaries, which comprised 8,000 words.

Agarunov wrote memoirs "Oil and Victory" (Russian: Нефть и Победа; Baku, 1991), "The Big Fate of a Small People" (Russian: Большая судьба маленького народа; Moscow, 1995), "How Judeo-Tat Literature Was Created" (Russian: Как создавалась татская литература). From 1974 to 1977, the almanac "The Soviet Motherland" (Judeo-Tat: Ватан Советиму) published excerpts of his works in the Judeo-Tat language.

== Notable works ==
- The poem "Dove" (Judeo-Tat: Ковтэр), 1920.
- The satirical comedy "King, Rabbi and the Rich Man" (Judeo-Tat: Падшох, рабби ва-ошир); 1920.
- The play "Whose fault?" (Judeo-Tat: Тахзир кини), alternatively titled "Tears of Joy" (Russian: Слёзы радости); 1928.
- The poem "Mountain Girl" (Judeo-Tat: Духдар доги), 1928.

== Selected publications ==
- Agarunov Ya. M. "The Big Fate of a Small People" About Mountain Jews: (Memoirs). Publishing house - Choro, 1995. 154 p. 2000 copies. – ISBN 5-8497-0014-5.
- Agarunov Ya. M. "Heroic deeds of Azerbaijani oilmen during the Great Patriotic War." Baku: publishing house - "Azerneshr", 1982. 107 p. 4000 copies.|| "Oil and Victory": (About the heroic accomplishments of Azerbaijani oilmen during the World War II.) Baku: publishing house - "Azerneshr", 1991. 166 p. 5000 copies.
- Agarunov Ya. M. "How the Judeo-Tat literature was created" // (Judeo-Tat: Ватан Советиму) - "The Soviet Motherland". 1974–1977. (excerpts; in Judeo-Tat)
- Agarunov Ya. M., Agarunov M. Ya. "Large dictionary of the language of Mountain Jews". Book I. Juhuri-Russian dictionary; Book II. Russian-Juhuri dictionary. Pyatigorsk: publishing house - PERO "Geula"; RIA-KMV, 2010. 660 p.
- Agarunov Ya. M., Agarunov M. Ya. "Judeo-Tat-Russian dictionary". 9000 words. Jewish University in Moscow, 1997. 204 p.

== Awards ==
- Order of Lenin
- Order of the Red Banner of Labour
- Order of the Badge of Honour
- Medal "For the Defence of the Caucasus"
- Medal "For Valiant Labour in the Great Patriotic War 1941–1945"
- Jubilee Medal "Thirty Years of Victory in the Great Patriotic War 1941–1945"
- Jubilee Medal "In Commemoration of the 100th Anniversary of the Birth of Vladimir Ilyich Lenin"
- Medal "Veteran of Labour"
- Badge "50 years in the CPSU"
- Personal pensioner of union significance
