= Zoya Semenduyeva =

Soviet-Israeli poet (1929–2020)

- Зоя Семендуева
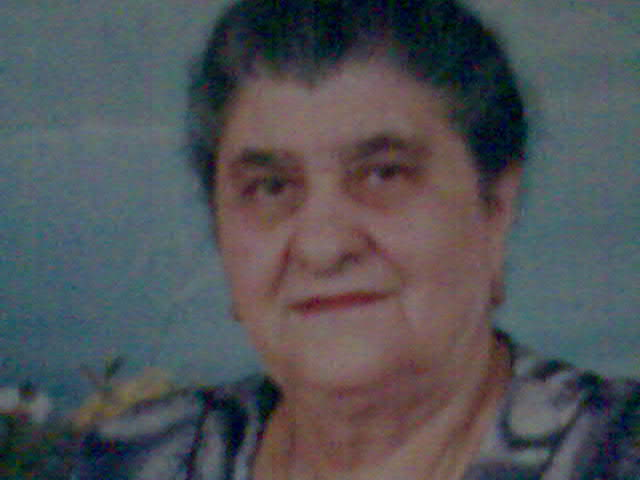
- Zoya Yunoevna Semenduyeva
- Born: 20 October 1929; Derbent, Dagestan ASSR, USSR
- Died: 9 April 2020 (aged 90); Netanya, Israel
- Occupation: Poet
- Writing career
- Genre: Poetry

Zoya Yunoevna Semenduyeva (Russian: Зоя Юноевна Семендуева; Hebrew: זויה סמנדוייבה; 20 October 1929 – 9 April 2020) was a Soviet and Israeli poet. She wrote in a language of the Mountain Jew (Juhuri). She was a member of Dagestan Writers' Union.

== Biography ==
Zoya Semenduyeva was born Zoya Yunoevna Haimova to Naamo and Yuno Haimov in Derbent, in the Republic of Dagestan ASSR, USSR. She moved with her parents to Makhachkala, where she studied accounting. In 1950 in Makhachkala, she started to work for the company "Dagknigoizdat", where she met her husband-to-be, Akhom (Alexey) Eudovich Semenduyev, and who was the head of the Edition Department.

== Career ==
Zoya Semenduyeva was constantly in a creative environment, she once decided to try her hand at poetry. Her first experiments were approved by Mountain Jews (Juhuri) poets Hizgil Avshalumov and Sergey Izgiyaev.

The first publication took place in 1960 on the pages of the almanac (Juhuri: "Ватан Советиму") - "Soviet Motherland", published in the Mountain Jewish language. The first collection (Juhuri: "Войгей дуьл") - "Command of the heart" was published in 1967, and before her repatriation to Israel, Zoya Semenduev published 10 collections of poetry. She wrote about her people, about love, friendship, about war and peace. Her works have been published in Moscow literary magazines. Two of her collections were released in Russian - "The Winner People" and "Song, Dream and Love."

The composers Khizgil Khanukaev and Yuno Avshalumov wrote songs to the verses of Zoya Semenduyeva.

=== Aliyah ===
In December 1992, Zoya Semenduyeva immigrated to Israel. In Israel, her poems were published in the collection (Juhuri: "Говлеи") - "Deliverance", and in 1998 she released a new collection of poems "At the Obelisk", which included works in Juhuri and translations of her poems into Russian. In 2007, the book (Juhuri: "Духдер эн дуь бебе") "Daughter of two fathers" was published, which includes the play of the same name and fairy tales. Zoya Semenduyeva was also published in the Israeli literary and journalistic almanac (Juhuri: "Мирвори") - "Pearls". In 1999, Zoya Semenduyeva became a member of the Union of Writers - Natives of the Caucasus (Israel).

Since 2008 and until her death, Zoya Semenduyeva and her husband participated in the project of translating the Tanakh (the Hebrew Bible) into Juhuri. They edited and proofread text. Zoya Semenduyev and her husband's knowledge of Juhuri and her previous experience in publishing contributed to the implementation of the project.

== Family ==
She had two sons, Igor and Semyon, and three daughters, Evgeniya, Tamara, and Svetlana, who gave her nine grandchildren and sixteen great-grandchildren. She also had a brother named Chaim. After immigrating to Israel, Zoya Semenduyeva lived in Kfar Yona. Her daughters Tamara and Svetlana also write poetry, and her grandson Daniel Semenduyev translates poetry from Hebrew into Russian and from Russian into Hebrew.

== Death ==
Semenduyeva died on 9 April 2020, in Netanya, Israel.

== Works ==
- Ватан Советиму (1960)
- Войгей дуьл (1967)
- Мозоллуье духдер догььи (1971)
- Комуне (1974)
- Э сер билогь (1979)
- Учитель (1981)
- Бовор сохденуьм (1984)
- Астарай ме (1988)
- Околица (1992)
- У обелиска. Бовор сохденуьм (1998)
- Духдер дуь бебе (2007)
- Мать солдата (2012)
