= Mordecai ben Avshalom =

Rebel Poet Mordecai ben Avshalom
- Мардахай бен Овшолум
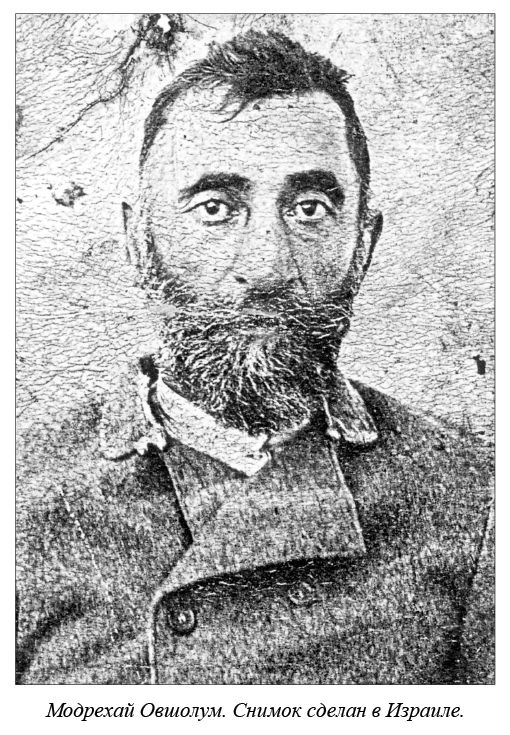
- Photo of Mordecai ben Avshalom in Israel. Circa 1895.
- Born: 1860; Derbent, Dagestan Oblast, Russian Empire
- Died: 1925 (aged 64–65); Derbent, Dagestan ASSR, USSR
- Resting place: Derbent, The Jewish Cemetery
- Other name: Russian: Сибири
- Occupation: Poet
- Spouse: Nerguz
- Children: 4, Mulaim, Khonum, Zulpo, Rachel
- Writing career
- Language: Judeo-Tat, Azerbaijani, Hebrew alphabet

Military service
- Allegiance: Russian Empire
- Years of service: 1904–1905
- Battles/wars: Russo-Japanese War
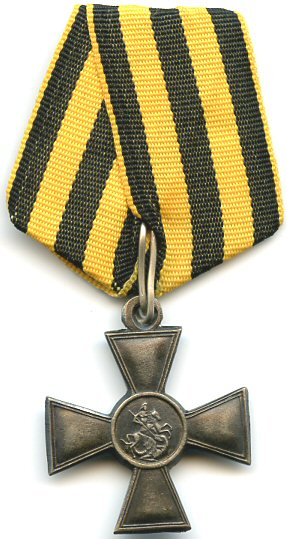
- Awards

Mordecai ben Avshalom (Russian: Мардахай бен Овшолум; Hebrew: מרדכי בן אבשלום; 1860 - 1925) was a Mountain Jew poet, abrek. He produced poetry, and songs with themes that included brotherhood, equality, justice, love, peace, rebellion against the existing system. His poetry called for social protest. Mordecai ben Avshalom wrote his poems and songs in the Hebrew alphabet, in the Judeo-Tat and Azerbaijani languages.

== Biography ==
Mordecai ben Avshalom was born in Derbent, Russian Empire, around 1860. From a young age he wrote poems in which he called for peace and brotherhood. He was one of the first poets whose work was distinguished by a social protest against the existing system. His poems have not been preserved but were written down from the memory of the inhabitants of Derbent and kept alive by famous Mountain Jewish writers and poets of different generations.

Mordecai ben Avshalom grew up to be a very tall and strong man: his height was more than 2 m. He defended the interests of the working man before the arbitrariness of the rich. He also took money and food from them by force and gave them to the synagogue for distribution to the poorest. Repeatedly referred to the Siberian penal servitude. During his prison escapes, he was in the position of abrek. After the first stay in hard labor for the murder of a gendarme who tried to rape a lonely widow, he received the nickname "Siberia".

In 1904, Mardachai ben Avshalom participated in the Russo-Japanese War, where he received the Cross of St. George for his bravery.

In 1925, he died at the hands of an enemy who poisoned him during a festive event.

== Family ==
The descendants of Mardakhai Avshalom are numerous and they live in many countries.

- Wife - Nerguz
- Daughters - Mulaim, Khonum, Zulpo, Rachel
- Mother - Purim
- Father - Avshalom
- Brothers - Mardecai, Yashagiyo, Irmiyo, Avshalom
- Sisters - Bizen, Batushvag, Shifra
- Grandpa - Shalum

== Legacy ==
Since 2012, the creative heritage of the classic of Mountain Jewish poetry of Mardakhai Avshalom has been studied in the literature lessons of the 8th grade of Kumykia secondary schools in Dagestan and Chechnya.

== Awards ==
- Cross of St. George
