= Mikhail Dadashev =

Mikhail Borisovich Dadashev
- Михаил Дадашев
- Born: 29 December 1936 (age 89); Derbent, Dagestan ASSR, Soviet Union
- Occupation: writer
- Writing career

Mikhail Borisovich Dadashev (Russian: Михаил Борисович Дадашев; Hebrew: מיכאיל דדשב; 1936) is a Soviet, Russian, and Dagestani writer. In 2016, by decree of the Head of Dagestan, Mikhail Dadashev was awarded the honorary title of "People's Writer of the Republic of Dagestan". He is a member of the Union of Writers of Russia. Dadashev is also a laureate of the Derzhavin Prize. In 2014, the Moscow City Organization of the Union of Russian Writers awarded him a diploma named after M. Yu. Lermontov, “No wonder all of Russia remembers,” with the presentation of the medal “M. Yu. Lermontov. 1814-1841.”

== Biography ==
Mikhail Dadashev was born in the city of Derbent, in the Dagestan ASSR, into a Mountain Jewish family.

During his school years, Mikhail Dadashev wrote his first works of fiction in Russian. While serving in the navy, he contributed to newspapers in Leningrad.

After graduating from the economics department of Moscow State University, Mikhail Dadashev worked in Derbent as head of the agriculture and industry section in the editorial offices of the newspapers For Communist Labor (Russian: За коммунистический труд) in Izberbash and Banner of Communism (Russian: Знамя коммунизма) in Derbent. He later served as the first secretary of the Derbent District Committee of the Komsomol. For 20 years, he headed the district financial department and subsequently worked in the tax service.

From 2002 until his retirement, he worked in Moscow at the central office of the Federal Taxation Service of the Russian Federation.

Mikhail Dadashev was awarded honorary certificates from the Ministry of Finance of the USSR, the Russian Federation, and the Republic of Dagestan.

He has been a member of the Union of Soviet Writers since 1980.

In 2018, he was awarded the Medal for Services to Derbent.

After many years of work in the Derbent region, Mikhail Dadashev moved to Moscow.

== Books ==
He is the author of several books, including:

- 2020, collected works in 5 volumes. The collected works include novels Brothers, Frosts, The Lying Tree, Poppy Trail, the stories In the Captivity of Apata, Fate, short stories and parables.
- 2013, And Sometimes the Heart Hurts from Laughter, parables. In 2015, Mikhail Dadashev was awarded the Derzhavin Prize for his book of parables.
- 2011, Frosts, novel
- 2008, In the Captivity of Apata, story
- 2008, The Lying Tree, novel
- 2006, Russian–Tat (Judeo-Tat) Dictionary
- 2002, The Poppy Trail, a historical novel about the destruction of the Jewish village of Aba-Sava — the capital of a small, semi-independent Mountain Jewish "principality" in Dagestan that existed from the 1630s until around 1800.
- 2000, Polonaise of Love, stories and plays
- 2000, Fate, selected editions
- 1995, Vanity of Vanities, parables.

Mikhail Dadashev wrote the autobiographical novel Roots, as well as the stories in the Judeo-Tat language:

- 1983, Fate (Judeo-Tat: Гьисмет), story
- 1980, Brothers (Judeo-Tat: Бироргьо), novel
- 1977, Confession (Judeo-Tat: Тубономе), collection of satirical stories
- 1972, Noble Man (Judeo-Tat: Хьэлоле мерд), collection of humorous stories
- The dry well (Judeo-Tat: Хуьшг бире чол)
- Water Tap (Judeo-Tat: Билогъ)
- False tradition (Judeo-Tat: Дургуне гIэдот), a play.
- Man and Boy (Judeo-Tat: Мерд не куклэ)

== Awards and Titles ==
- Medal for Services to Derbent (2018)
- People's Writer of the Republic of Dagestan (2016)
- Laureate of the Derzhavin Prize (2015)
- Diploma named after M. Yu. Lermontov "No wonder all of Russia remembers" with the presentation of the medal "M.Yu. Lermontov.1814-1841." (2014)
