= Dadash (given name) =

Dadash is an Azerbaijani and Turkish masculine given name. Notable people with the name include:

- Dadash Babazhanov (1922–1985), Soviet machine gunner and war hero of Uyghur origin
- Dadash Bunyadzade (1888–1938), Azerbaijani politician
- Dadash Dadashbayli (born 1996), Azerbaijani weightlifter
- Dadaş İbrahimov (born 1976), Azerbaijani sprinter
- Dadash Kazikhanov (born 1979), Russian football player
- Dadash Rzayev (1935–2024), Azerbaijani general, politician and minister

== See also ==
- Dadashov, surname derived from the name
