= Uçgün =

- Municipality
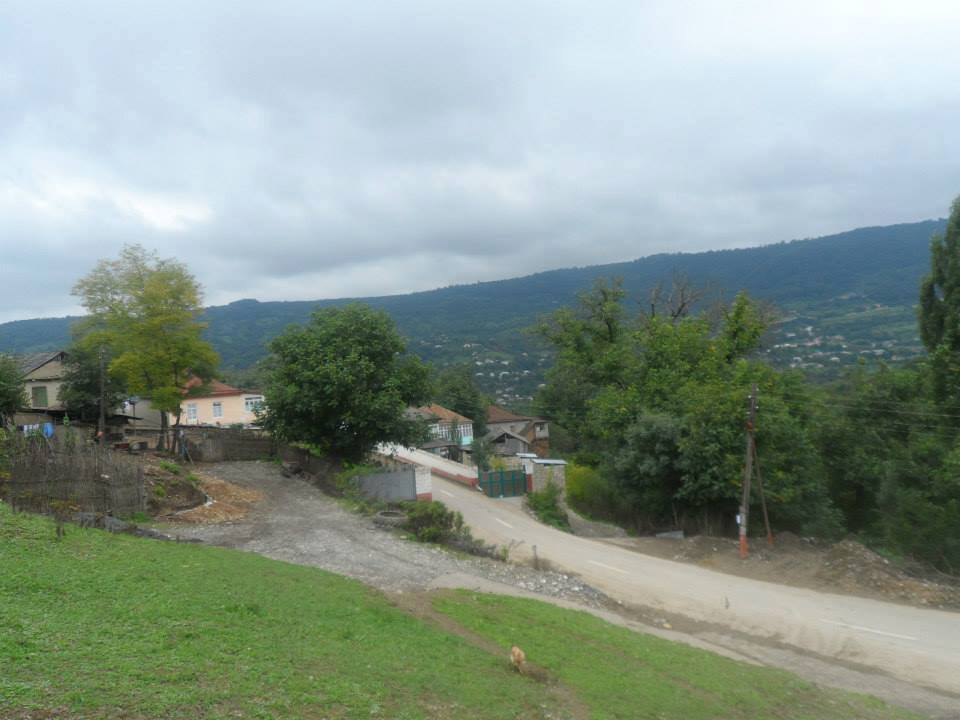

- Location within Azerbaijan
- Coordinates: 41°19′47″N 48°22′57″E
- Country: Azerbaijan
- Rayon: Quba

Population
  - Total: 886
- Time zone: UTC+4 (AZT)
  - Summer (DST): UTC+5 (AZT)

Uçgün (also, Üçgün and Uchgyun) is a village and municipality in the Quba Rayon of Azerbaijan. It has a population of 886.
