= Şuduq =

- Municipality
- Location within Azerbaijan
- Coordinates: 41°15′10″N 48°30′59″E
- Country: Azerbaijan
- Rayon: Quba

Population
  - Total: 428
- Time zone: UTC+4 (AZT)
  - Summer (DST): UTC+5 (AZT)

Şuduq (also, Shudug and Shudukh) is a village and municipality in the Quba Rayon of Azerbaijan. It has a population of 428.
