= Dagestankaya Pravda =

Дагестанская правда
- Type: General newspaper
- Founded: 9 March 1918
- Language: Russian
- Headquarters: Makhachkala
- Circulation: c. 16,500
- Website: www.dagpravda.ru

Dagestanskaya Pravda (Russian: Дагестанская правда, Dagestani Truth) is the main Russian language newspaper of Dagestan.

It received the Order of the Badge of Honour in 1968.

Previous names:

- 1918-1920: Дагестанский труженик (Dagestani worker)
- 1920-1922: Советский Дагестан (Soviet Dagestan)
- 1922-1932: Красный Дагестан (Red Dagestan)
