= Vatan (Dagestani newspaper) =

- Native name: Ватан
- Type: Socio-political newspaper
- Founded: 1928
- Language: Judeo-Tat, Russian
- City: Makhachkala, Dagestan
- Country: Russia
- Website: http://www.gazetavatan.ru/

Vatan (Judeo-Tat: Ватан; Russian: Родина; Hebrew: מוֹלֶדֶת; meaning "Motherland") is a socio-political newspaper in the Judeo-Tat and Russian languages. The newspaper covers the social and political events taking place in Dagestan, Russia, and also publishes materials on the history and culture of the Mountain Jews.

== History ==
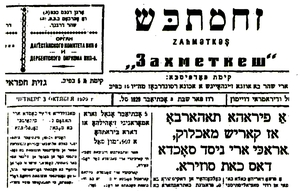
The logo of the newspaper in 1929

The newspaper was founded in 1928 under the name The Toiler (Judeo-Tat: Захметкеш). Asail Binaev became the first editor. Initially, the newspaper was printed in the Hebrew alphabet. In 1929-1930 it switched to the Latin alphabet, and, in 1938, to the Cyrillic alphabet, which is still used today. In the middle of 1938, the newspaper received a new name: Red Star (Judeo-Tat: Гъирмизине Астара).

In the 1930s, the Mountain Jewish poet Daniil Atnilov worked for the newspaper.

In the late 1940s, the newspaper was discontinued. The newspaper renewed work in 1975.

In 1991, the name of the newspaper was changed to "Vatan," which translates as "Motherland."
