= Judeo-Tat =

Persian-derived Jewish language of the eastern Caucasus

- Juhuri
- Cuhuri Жугьури ז׳אוּהאוּראִ
- Native to: Azerbaijan, Russia – North Caucasian Federal District, spoken by immigrant communities in Israel, United States (New York City)
- Ethnicity: Mountain Jews
- Native speakers: 30,000 (2026)
- Language family: Indo-European: Indo-Iranian; Iranian; Western Iranian; Southwestern Iranian; Persian; Tat; Judeo-Tat
- Writing system: Latin, Cyrillic, Hebrew

Language codes
- ISO 639-3: jdt
- Glottolog: jude1256
- ELP: Judeo-Tat
- Judeo-Tat is classified as Definitely Endangered by the UNESCO Atlas of the World's Languages in Danger (2010).

Judeo-Tat or Juhuri (Cuhuri, Жугьури, ז׳אוּהאוּראִ) is a Judeo-Persian dialect and the traditional language spoken by the Mountain Jews in the eastern Caucasus Mountains, especially Azerbaijan, parts of Russia and today in Israel. It belongs to the southwestern group of the Iranian division of the Indo-European languages, albeit with heavy influence from Hebrew. The words Juhuri and Juhuro translate as "Jewish" and "Jews".

The Iranic Tat language is spoken by the Muslim Tats of Azerbaijan, a group to which the Mountain Jews were mistakenly considered to belong during the era of Soviet historiography though the languages probably originated in the same region of the Persian Empire.

Judeo-Tat features Semitic elements in all linguistic levels of the language. Uniquely, Judeo-Tat retains the voiced pharyngeal approximant, also known as ayin (ع/ע), a phoneme whose presence is considered to be a hallmark of Semitic languages such as Arabic and no longer found in Modern Hebrew; no neighbouring languages feature it.

Judeo-Tat is an endangered language classified as "definitely endangered" by UNESCO's Atlas of the World's Languages in Danger.

== Distribution ==
The language is spoken by an estimated 101,000 people:

- Israel: 70,000 in 1998
- Azerbaijan: 24,000 in 1989
- Russia: 2,000 in 2010
- United States: 5,000
- Canada 2,500

== Dialects ==
Being a variety of the Tat language, Judeo-Tat itself can be divided into several dialects:

- Quba dialect (traditionally spoken in Quba and Qırmızı Qəsəbə as well as other towns and villages in the region.).
- Derbent dialect (traditionally spoken in the town of Derbent and the surrounding villages).
- Kaitag dialect (spoken in the North Caucasus).

The dialects of Oğuz (formerly Vartashen) and the now extinct Jewish community of Mücü have not been studied well and thus cannot be classified.

== Phonology ==
Vowel phonemes of Judeo-Tat
	Front		Central	Back
	Unrounded	Rounded	Central	Back
Close	i	y		u
Near-close	ɪ			
Mid	ɛ			o
Open	æ		a	

Consonant phonemes of Judeo-Tat
		Labial	Dental/ Alveolar	Post- alv./Palatal	Velar	Uvular	Pharyn -geal	Glottal
Nasal		m	n̪					
Stop/ Affricate	voiceless	p	t̪	t͡ʃ	k			
Stop/ Affricate	voiced	b	d̪	d͡ʒ	ɡ	ɢ		
Fricative	voiceless	f	s̪	ʃ		χ	ħ	h
Fricative	voiced	v	z̪					
Approximant			l	j			ʕ	
Flap			ɾ					

== Alphabet ==
In the early 20th century, Judeo-Tat used the Hebrew script. In the 1920s, the Latin script was adapted for it; later it was written in Cyrillic. The use of the Hebrew alphabet has enjoyed renewed popularity.

Script and phonemes of Judeo-Tat
Latin	Aa	Bb	Cc	Çç	Dd	Ee	Əə	Ff	Gg	Hh	Ḩḩ	Ħћ	Ii	Jj	Kk	Ll	Mm	Nn	Oo	Pp	Qq	Rr	Ss	Şş	Tt	Uu	Vv	Xx	Yy	Zz
Cyrillic	Аа	Бб	Чч	Жж	Дд	Ее	Ээ, Ее	Фф	Гг	Гьгь	ГӀгӀ	Хьхь	Ии	Йй	Кк	Лл	Мм	Нн	Оо	Пп	Гъгъ	Рр	Сс	Шш	Тт	Уу	Вв	Хх	Уьуь	Зз
Hebrew	אַ	בּ	ג׳/צ	ז׳	ד	אי	א	פ	ג	ה	ע	ח	אִ	י	כּ	ל	מ	נ	אָ	פּ	ק	ר	ס	ש	ת	אוּ	ב	כ	או	ז
IPA	a	b	tʃ/ts	dʒ	d	ɛ	æ	f	g	h	ʕ	ħ	i	j	k	l	m	n	o	p	ɢ	ɾ	s	ʃ	t	u	v	χ	y	z

== Influences and etymology ==
Judeo-Tat is a Southwest Iranian language (as is modern Persian) and is much more closely related to (but not fully mutually intelligible with) modern Persian than most other Iranian languages of the Caucasus (for example: Talysh, Ossetian, and Kurdish). However, it also bears strong influence from other sources:

Medieval Persian: Postpositions are used predominantly in lieu of prepositions, for example in modern Persian: باز او > Judeo-Tat æ uræ-voz "with him/her".

Arabic: like in modern Persian, a significant portion of the vocabulary is Arabic in origin. Unlike modern Persian, Judeo-Tat has almost universally retained the original pharyngeal/uvular phonemes of Arabic, for example /ʕæsæl/ "honey" (Arab. عسل), /sæbæħ/ "morning" (Arab. صباح).

Hebrew: As in other Jewish dialects, the language also has many Hebrew loanwords, for example /ʃulħon/ "table" (Heb. שֻלחן shulḥan), /mozol/ "luck" (Heb. מזל mazal), /ʕoʃiɾ/ "rich" (Heb. עשיר ʻashir). Hebrew words are typically pronounced in the tradition of other Mizrahi Jews. Examples: ח and ע are pronounced pharyngeally (like Arabic ح, ع respectively); ק is pronounced as a voiced uvular plosive (like Persian ق/غ). Classical Hebrew /w/ (ו) and /aː/ (kamatz), however, are typically pronounced as /v/ and /o/ respectively (similar to the Persian/Ashkenazi traditions, but unlike the Iraqi tradition, which retains /w/ and /aː/)

Azerbaijani: Vowel harmony and many loan words

Russian: Loanwords adopted after the Russian Empire's annexation of Daghestan and Azerbaijan

Northeast Caucasian languages: /tʃuklæ/ "small" (probably the same origin as the medieval Caucasian city name "Sera-chuk" mentioned by Ibn Battuta, meaning "little Sera")

Other common phonology/morphology changes from classical Persian/Arabic/Hebrew:

- /aː/ > /o/, /æ/, or /u/ as in /kitob/ "book" (Arab. كتاب), /ɾæħ/ "road/path" (Pers. راه rāh), /ɢurbu/ "sacrifice" (Arab., Aramaic /qurbaːn/ or Heb. קרבן Korban)
- /o/ > /u/ as in /ovʃolum/ "Absalom" (Heb. אבשלום Abshalom)
- /u/ > /y/, especially under the influence of vowel harmony
- Stress on the final syllable of words
- Dropping of the final /n/ as in /soχtæ/ "to make" (Pers. ساختن sākhtan)

== See also ==
- Judeo-Tat literature
