= Judaism in Dagestan =

Religious group

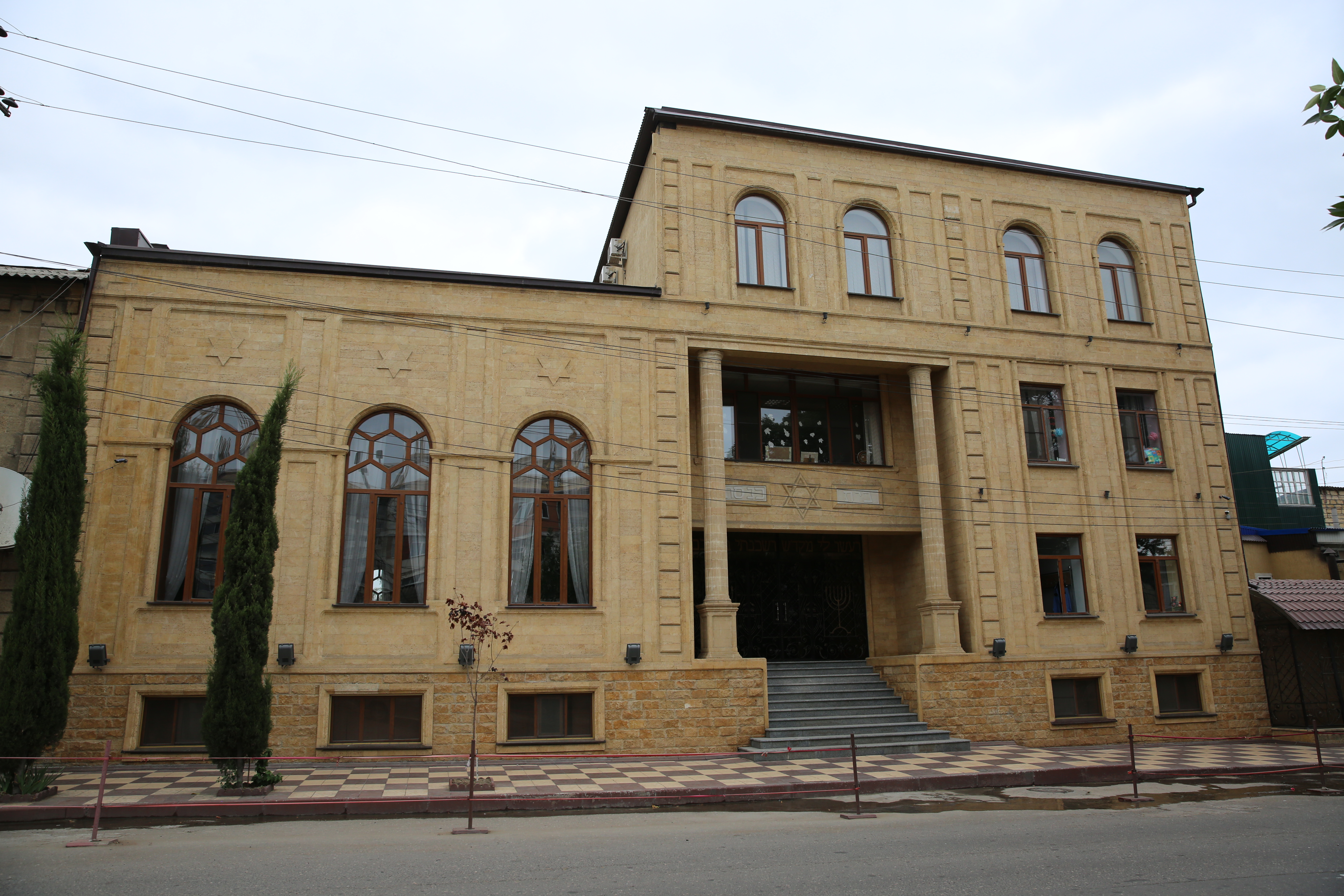
Derbent Synagogue

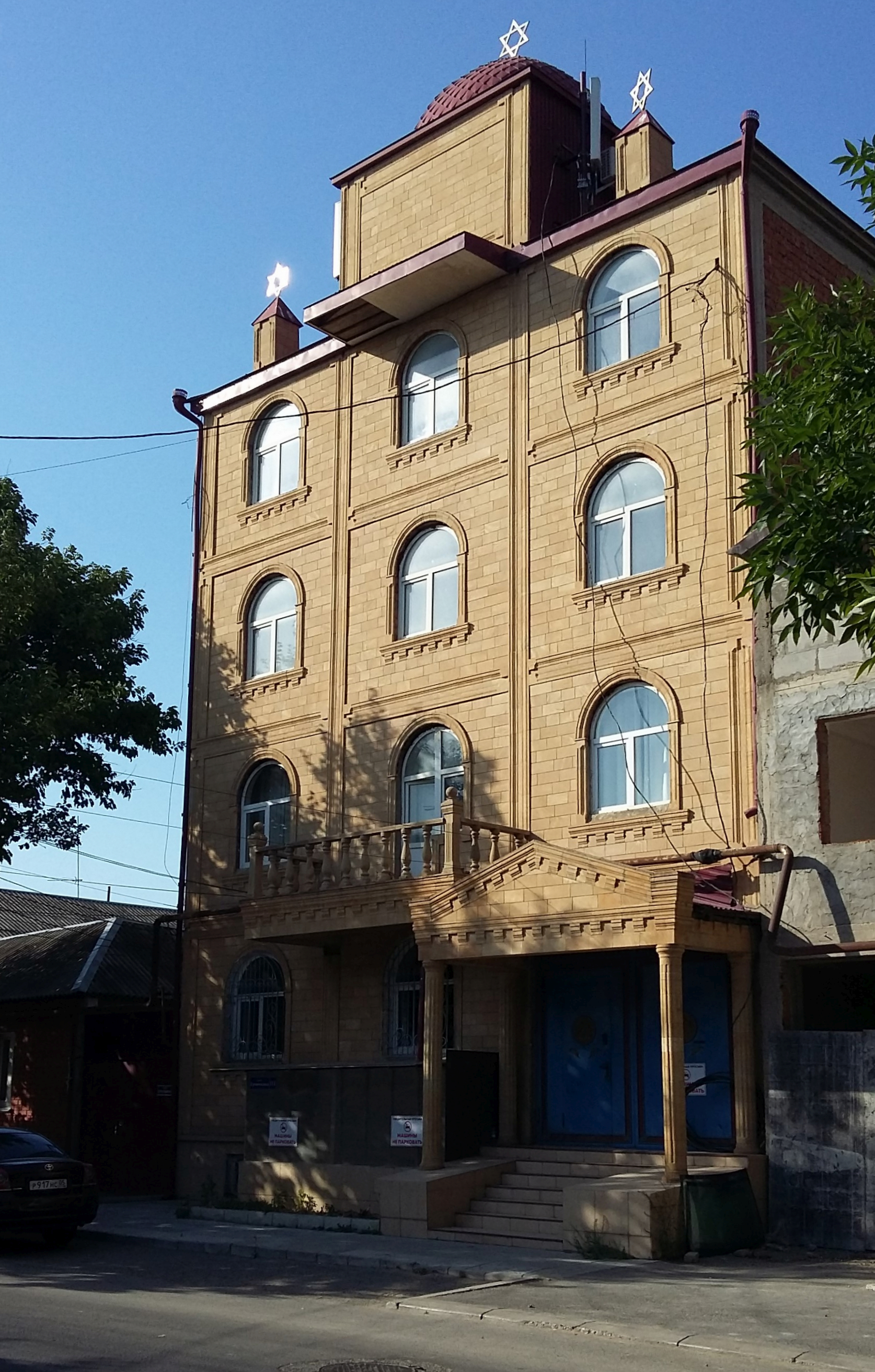
Makhachkala Synagogue. 2022.

Judaism in Dagestan is mainly practiced by Mountain Jews. By the beginning of the 8th century BCE Mountain Jews had reached Persia from Israel. Under the Sasanian Empire, with the arrival in Dagestan of Iranian-speaking tribes from the north, they settled in different regions of the Caucasus.

According to the 2002 census, there were 3,400 Jews in Dagestan, including 430 Jews (0.08%) in Makhachkala, of whom 61 were Mountain Jews (0.01%).

== History ==
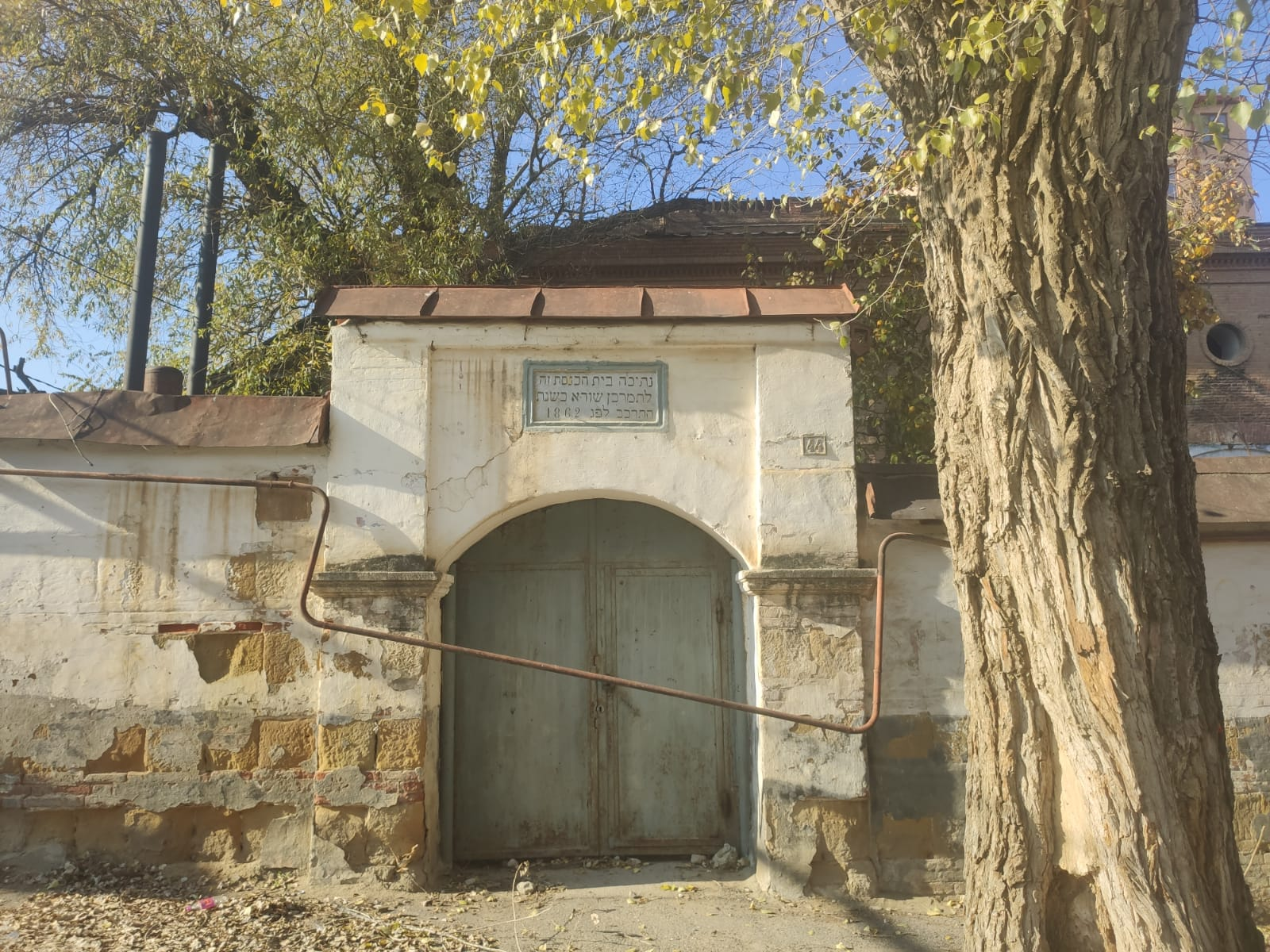
The main entrance of the Buynaksk Synagogue. 2024.

References to Jewish communities in the Caucasus are found in the works of Armenian, Georgian, and Arab historians, including Faustus of Byzantium, Elishe, Movses Kaghankatvatsi, Movses Khorenatsi, and Al-Masudi. Historical field research has also revealed many legends associated with the existence of Judaism in the region. Petroglyphs with the Star of David and other symbols of the Jewish faith have been found in many regions of Dagestan. The toponymy of the North-Eastern Caucasus has preserved many names associated with Jews. For example, the mountain village in the Tabasaransky District is called Dzhugud-kala (literally, “Jewish fortress” or “fortress of the Jews”); the gorge near Madzhalis is Dzhut-Gatta, and the mountain in this area is Dzhufudag, meaning “Jewish Mountain.”

The settlement area of Mountain Jews completely coincides with the territory occupied by Sasanian settlers during the times of Kavad I and Khosrow I Anushirvan. Almost all chronicles, toponymy, petroglyphs, and folklore related to Judaism were recorded precisely on those lands where the border posts of the Sassanids and later the Arabs functioned. These areas include the modern Derbentsky, Tabasaransky, Kaytagsky, Suleyman-Stalsky, Khivsky, Magaramkentsky, Akhtynsky, Rutulsky, and Agulsky districts of Dagestan. Moreover, it was in those settlements that the strongholds of those administrations were located (Dzhalgan, Jarrakh, Nyugdi, Khanzhalkala, Mamrach, etc.). The material traces of Jewish communities are best preserved in the vicinity of Derbent, as well as in the historical lands of Tabasaran and Kaytag.

Adam Olearius, who visited Dagestan in the first half of the 17th century, wrote about the Jewish population of Kaitag, Tabasaran, and Derbent. He noted:

Now there are many, many Jews living in Tabasaran.

In another place he wrote:

There are no Christians in the city of Derbent, as some writers say; only Mohammedan and Jews live here, writing themselves from the tribe of Benjamin.

The same words are repeated in the work of Jan Janszoon Struys, a Dutch traveler who visited Dagestan in 1670:

There are no Christians in the city of Derbent, but only Mohammedans and a few Jews.

Faustus of Byzantium wrote that Armenian King Tigranes the Great (95–55 BC) brought Jews from Israel to the Caucasus for the first time and settled them in mountain gorges in the 1st century BC. The Jewish colonists remained an influential military force in the Caucasus for many centuries until the conquest of Armenia by Shapur II (309–379 AD), who carried out a devastating campaign in Armenia, led away tens of thousands of Jewish colonists, and settled them in Iran.

=== Modern times ===
In the 2000s, Dagestan had four synagogues: three in Makhachkala, Derbent, and Buynaksk, and one prayer house in Khasavyurt.

In Derbent, there is a Jewish community and the Sephardic synagogue "Kele-Numaz." Additionally, Vatan, the only newspaper in Russia in the Mountain Jewish language (Juhuri), is published there. There are only six clergymen of the Jewish religious denomination operating in Dagestan (community chairmen, cantors, and acting rabbis). Hebrew school functioned at the synagogues. There were no higher or secondary Jewish educational institutions in the republic.

Amid the Hamas-Israel war war, there was a wave of anti-Semitic attacks in Dagestan and other areas of the North Caucasus. In one case, on 29 October 2023, a group waving Palestinian flags and chanting anti-Semitic slogans forcefully entered Makhachkala Airport. Their target was Israeli and Jewish travelers arriving on a flight from Tel Aviv. The incident resulted in about 20 injuries, as reported by local health authorities. Passports of some passengers were scrutinized by the crowd. Meanwhile, in the nearby city of Khasavyurt, protesters surrounded a hotel, suspecting it accommodated Jewish tourists.

On June 23, 2024, Islamist terrorists burned the Jewish synagogue in Derbent.

== See also ==
- History of the Jews in Buynaksk
- History of the Jews in Derbent
- History of the Jews in Khasavyurt
- History of the Jews in Kizlyar
- History of the Jews in Makhachkala
