= Khudig =

Khudig Худиг Худигъ
- Selo
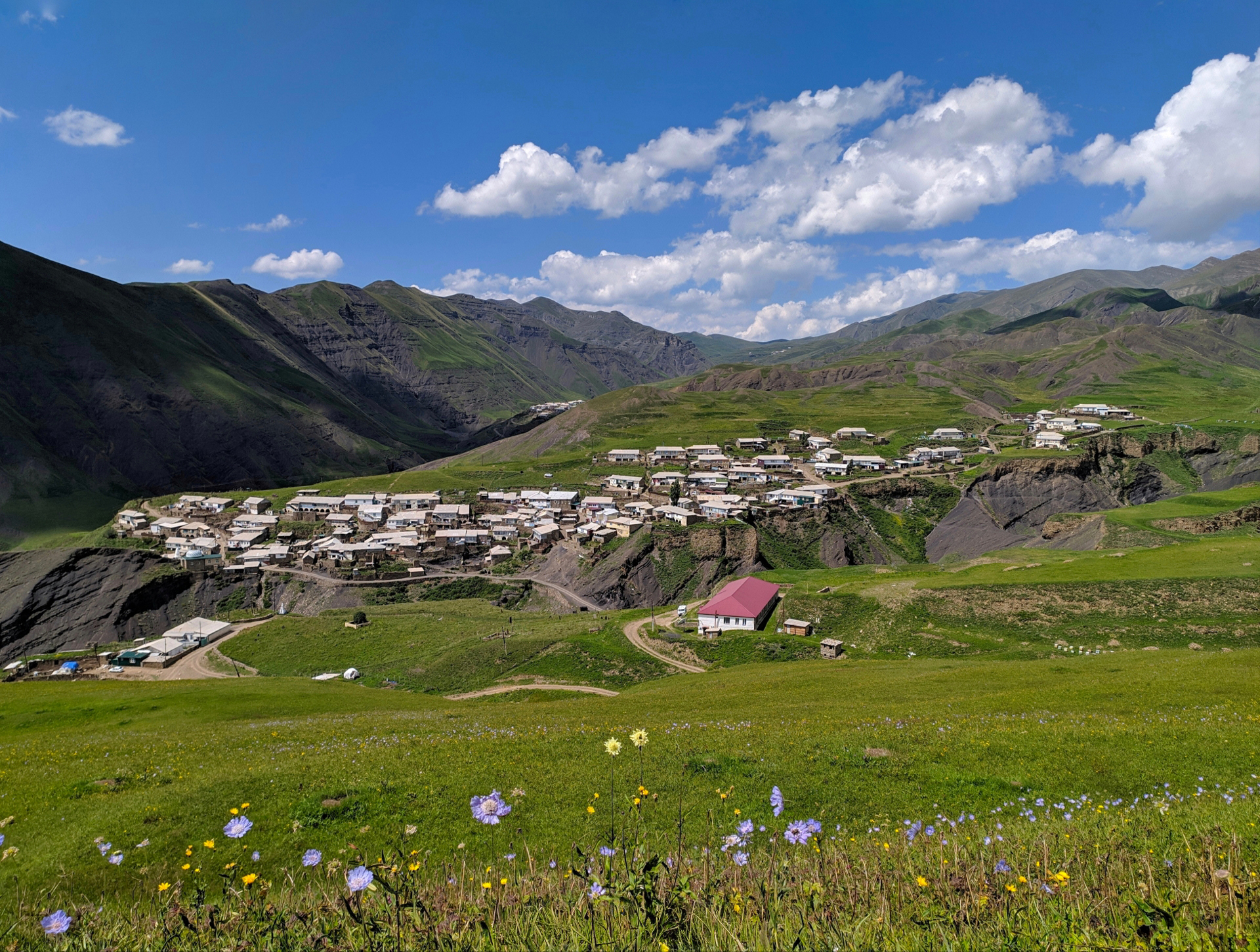

- Location within Republic of Dagestan Location within Russia
- Coordinates: 41°51′N 47°39′E
- Country: Russia
- Region: Republic of Dagestan
- District: Agulsky District
- Time zone: UTC+3:00

Khudig (Russian: Худиг; Aghul: Худигъ) is a rural locality (a selo) in Kuragsky Selsoviet, Agulsky District, Republic of Dagestan, Russia. The population was 673 as of 2010.

== Geography ==
Khudig is located on the Koshanapu River, 21 km northeast of Tpig (the district's administrative centre) by road. Kurag is the nearest rural locality.
