= Yarkug =

Yarkug Яркуг
- Selo
- Location within Republic of Dagestan Location within Russia
- Coordinates: 41°47′N 47°41′E
- Country: Russia
- Region: Republic of Dagestan
- District: Agulsky District
- Time zone: UTC+3:00

Yarkug (Russian: Яркуг) is a rural locality (a selo) in Burshagsky Selsoviet, Agulsky District, Republic of Dagestan, Russia. The population was 340 as of 2010.

== Geography ==
Yarkug is located on the Koshanapu River, 14 km northeast of Tpig (the district's administrative centre) by road. Duldug is the nearest rural locality.
