= Kurag, Republic of Dagestan =

Kurag Кураг Курягъ
- Selo
- Location within Republic of Dagestan Location within Russia
- Coordinates: 41°50′N 47°39′E
- Country: Russia
- Region: Republic of Dagestan
- District: Agulsky District
- Time zone: UTC+3:00

Kurag (Russian: Кураг; Aghul: Курягъ) is a rural locality (a selo) and the administrative centre of Kuragsky Selsoviet, Agulsky District, Republic of Dagestan, Russia. The population was 421 as of 2010.

== Geography ==
Kurag is located on the Koshanapu River, 18 km northeast of Tpig (the district's administrative centre) by road. Khudig is the nearest rural locality.
