= Amukh =

Amukh Амух ГӀямух
- Selo
- Location within Republic of Dagestan Location within Russia
- Coordinates: 41°54′N 47°32′E
- Country: Russia
- Region: Republic of Dagestan
- District: Agulsky District
- Time zone: UTC+3:00

Amukh (Russian: Амух; Dargwa: ГӀямух) is a rural locality (a selo) and the administrative centre of Amukhsky Selsoviet, Agulsky District, Republic of Dagestan, in southern Russia. The population was 118 as of 2010.

== Geography ==
Amukh is located 21 km north of Tpig (the district's administrative centre) by road. Tsirkhe is the nearest rural locality.
