= Shari, Agulsky District, Republic of Dagestan =

Shari Шари
- Selo
- Location within Republic of Dagestan Location within Russia
- Coordinates: 41°57′N 47°36′E
- Country: Russia
- Region: Republic of Dagestan
- District: Agulsky District
- Time zone: UTC+3:00

Shari (Russian: Шари) is a rural locality (selo) in Amukhsky Selsoviet, Agulsky District, Republic of Dagestan, Russia. The population was 19 in 2010.

== Geography ==
It is located 31 kilometres (19 mi) north of Tpig.
