= Duldug =

Duldug Дулдуг
- Selo
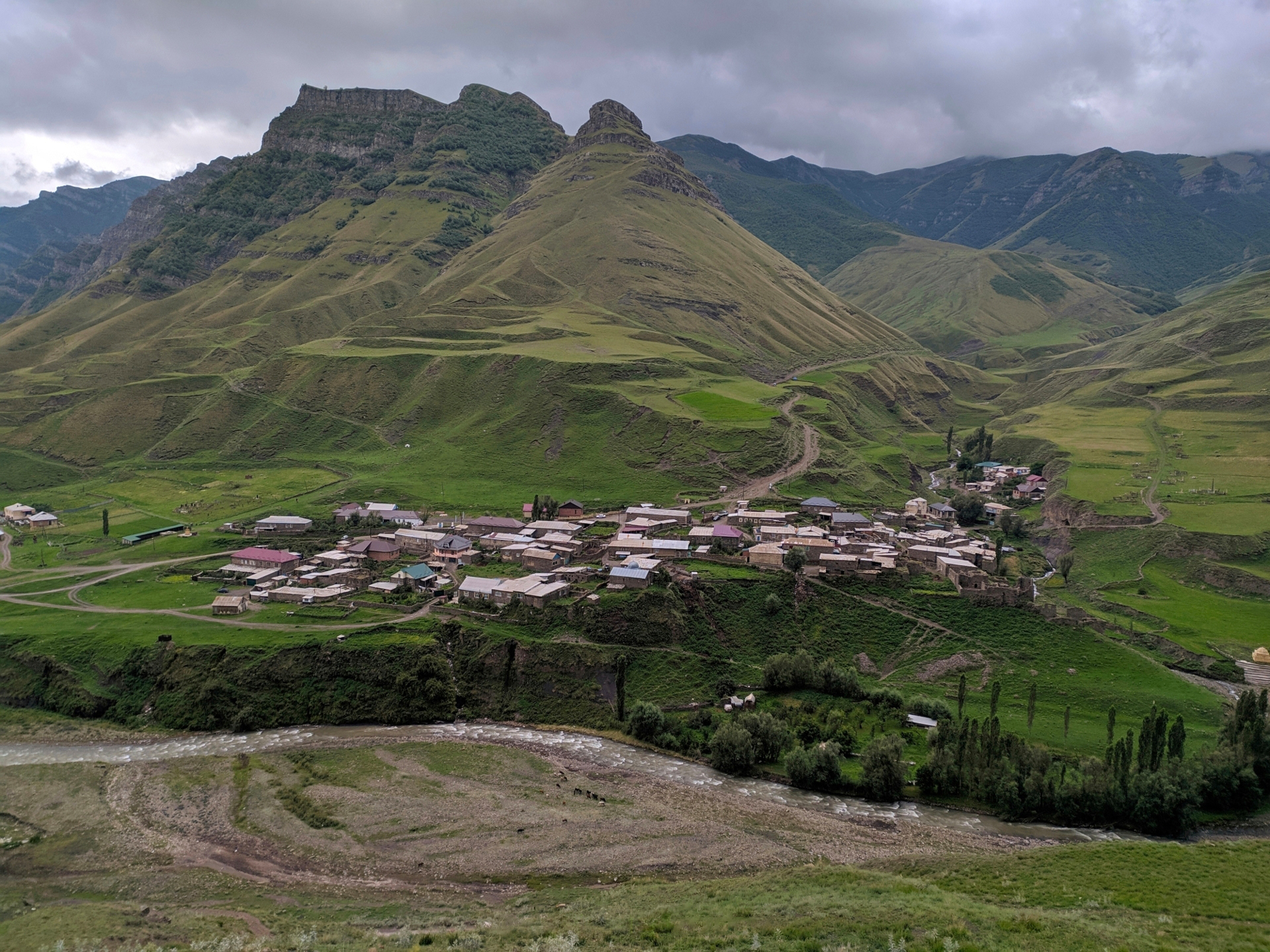
- View of Duldug

- Location within Republic of Dagestan Location within Russia
- Coordinates: 41°46′N 47°40′E
- Country: Russia
- Region: Republic of Dagestan
- District: Agulsky District
- Time zone: UTC+3:00

Duldug (Russian: Дулдуг) is a rural locality (a selo) and the administrative centre of Burshagsky Selsoviet, Agulsky District, Republic of Dagestan, Russia. The population was 542 as of 2010.

== Geography ==
Duldug is located 8 km east of Tpig (the district's administrative centre) by road. Goa is the nearest rural locality.
