= Church of the Intercession of the Holy Virgin of Derbent =

Church of the Intercession of the Holy Virgin
- Церковь Покрова Пресвятой Богородицы (Russian)
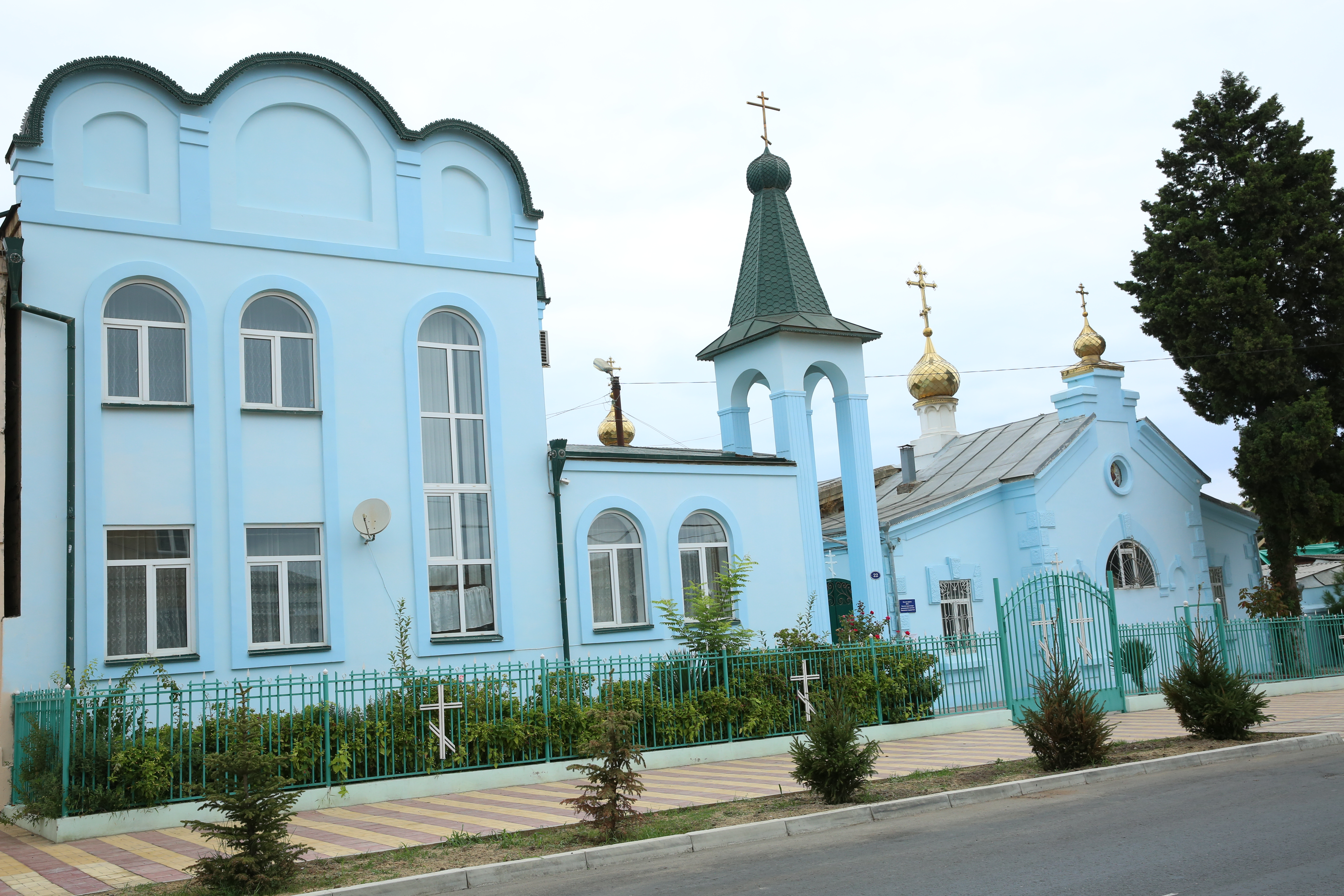
- Church of the Intercession of the Holy Virgin
- 42°03′30″N 48°18′00″E
- Location: Derbent, Dagestan
- Country: Russia
- Denomination: Eastern Orthodoxy

History
- Status: Active
- Consecrated: January 7, 1900

Architecture
- Groundbreaking: 1899

Administration
- Diocese: Makhachkala

The Church of the Intercession of the Holy Virgin (Russian: Церковь Покрова Пресвятой Богородицы, romanized: Tserkov Pokrova Presvyatoy Bogoroditsy) is an Orthodox church in Derbent, a city in the Russian republic of Dagestan.

The parish belongs to the Makhachkala deanery of the Diocese of Makhachkala of the Russian Orthodox Church. Until 2011, the church belonged to the Diocese of Baku and Azerbaijan. It is the only surviving Orthodox church in the city.

== History ==
In 1894, the Derbent Orthodox community raised the issue of building a new parochial school. For these purposes, donations were collected and a plot of land in the city center was purchased. The construction of the school began in 1899, and on January 7, 1900, it was solemnly consecrated.

In 1901, an altar was arranged at the school, and it turned into a church-school, which on October 1, 1901 was consecrated by Bishop Vladimir (Sinkovsky) of Vladikavkaz.

In 1902, in the courtyard of the church-school, a new building for the parochial school was built, and the old one was completely given to the church.

In 1939, the church was closed, but in 1943 it was again handed over to believers.

In the 2000s, a church house and a bell tower were built. On October 14, 2009, Bishop Alexander (Ishchein) of Diocese of Baku and Azerbaijan performed the rite of the consecration of the restored church.

=== 2024 attack ===
On June 23, 2024, the church, together with the Derbent Synagogue, was subjected to an armed attack, during which Archpriest Nikolay Kotelnikov was killed.

== See also ==
- Vladikavkaz and Makhachkala diocese
