= Nikolay Kotelnikov =

Russian Orthodox priest (1955–2024)

Father Nikolay Mikhailovich Kotelnikov
- Rector of the Church of the Intercession of the Holy Virgin of Derbent
- Father Nikolay in 2017
- Native name: Николай
- Church: Russian Orthodox Church
- Diocese: Diocese of Makhachkala

Orders
- Ordination: 1977

Personal details
- Born: Nikolay Mikhailovich Kotelnikov; February 4, 1955 Sunzhensky District, Checheno-Ingush ASSR, Russian SFSR, USSR
- Died: 23 June 2024 (aged 69) Derbent, Dagestan, Russia
- Spouse: Valentina Kotelnikova
- Children: 3

Father Nikolay Mikhailovich Kotelnikov (Russian: Николай Михайлович Котельников, 4 February 1955 – 23 June 2024) was a Russian Orthodox protoiereus who served as rector of the Church of the Intercession of the Holy Virgin in Derbent for more than 40 years. For a long time, he was the only Orthodox priest in the city and was considered the oldest abbot in Dagestan.

Suffering from terminal cancer, he continued to hold services until 23 June 2024, when Kotelnikov was murdered by Islamic terrorists that attacked and burned down his church, among other targets. It was later revealed that Kotelnikov was one of the attackers' primary targets.

== Biography ==
=== Early life ===
Nikolay Kotelnikov was born in the Sunzhensky District of Checheno-Ingush ASSR on 4 February 1955. He served his military service in the Soviet Army and received his theological education by correspondence. Nikolai Kotelnikov's spiritual mentor was Protoiereus Pyotr Sukhonosov, the rector of the church in Sunzha, who was kidnapped by Arbi Barayev's militants and tortured to death in 1999.

=== Career in the Orthodox Church ===
Nikolay Kotelnikov became a priest in 1977, and came to the Dagestan ASSR at the age of 21 on the advice of Archbishop Anthony of Stavropol. For a long time, he was the only Orthodox priest in Derbent; the priest was the rector of the Church of the Intercession of the Holy Virgin. Under Protoiereus Nikolai, the church underwent large-scale repair and restoration work. On Kotelnikov's initiative, since 2005, the Holy Fire, which has great significance for Orthodox believers, has been brought to Derbent every year. According to the media, Derbent residents spoke about Nikolai exclusively positively: he never refused to help those in need, not only Orthodox, but also those who professed other religions. Orthodox residents of Derbent believe that with the arrival of Father Nikolay, the life of Christians in the city has noticeably improved.

On the eve of the 2000th anniversary of Derbent in 2015, Kotelnikov stated in an interview that the Orthodox community in the city was shrinking. According to him, most of the parishioners were women and officers from a nearby military base. Kotelnikov was involved in educational activities and taught at a local Sunday school. Kotelnikov also participated in interreligious conferences in Dagestan, built relationships with representatives of other religions in Derbent, and at the same time abandoned Orthodox missionary activity. During the Christmas holidays, Nikolai Mikhailovich regularly went to the social rehabilitation centre for minors and handed out sweets to the children.

=== Death ===
On 23 June 2024, during an attack in Derbent, terrorists ran into a Church of the Intercession of the Holy Virgin and set fire to the central icon, then ran into Nikolai Kotelnikov's residence and killed him, and set the residence on fire too. According to Nikolai's widow, Valentina Kotelnikova, the terrorist first pointed a gun at her, then saw Nikolai and shot him. She also said that she recognized her husband's killer as MMA fighter Gadzhimurat Kagirov. According to Kotelnikov's son-in-law, the initial shot was not fatal; Kotelnikov was ultimately stabbed to death.

Initially, the media reported that the terrorists slit the priest's throat, but this was later denied by the Derbent mayor's office press service, which stated that Kotelnikov was shot. In the following days, it became known that Nikolai Kotelnikov was one of the main targets of the terrorist attack: his photo was pinned in the terrorist coordination chat. According to another Russian Orthodox priest, Kotelnikov was chosen as a target because "his two sons-in-law are Azerbaijanis who converted to Orthodoxy and became priests. This is what really irritated them [attackers]". Subsequently, the church that Kotelnikov led was burned down.

Kotelnikov was buried on the grounds of the Church of the Intercession of the Holy Virgin of Derbent, where he had served for over 45 years.

== Awards and honours ==
During Nikolai Kotelnikov's lifetime, a sculptural composition "Monument to the Friendship of Three Religions" was erected in Derbent in Mirza Muhammad-Ali Kazem-Bek Lane, depicting an Orthodox priest, Rabbi and Mullah sitting at one table. Nikolay Kotelnikov became the prototype of the Orthodox clergyman.

On 25 June 2024, local authorities announced that Nikolai Kotelnikov would be nominated for the Order of Courage posthumously.

== Personal life ==
Nikolay Kotelnikov had a wife, Valentina, three children and six grandchildren. Kotelnikov's daughters, Olga and Galina, married the priest of the Church of the Intercession of the Holy Virgin, Mikhail Lobov, and the rector of the Grozny Church of Archangel Michael, Sergey Abasov. During the evening service, armed men tried to break into the church in Grozny on 19 May 2018 but the parishioners managed to close the doors. As a result of the attack, two police officers and one visitor were killed.

The archpriest was a distant relative of politician and former head of Roscosmos, Dmitry Rogozin, although Rogozin did not know of his existence until Kotelnikov's death.

Father Nikolay suffered from cancer in his last years. His Derbent church page announced a collection of donations for the protoiereus's surgery.
