= History of the Jews in Makhachkala =

Makhachkala Jews
יהודי מחצ'קלה Махачкалинские евреи
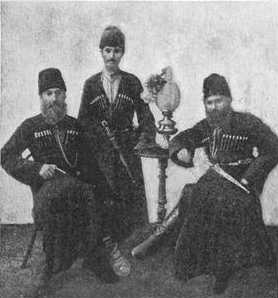

Total population
- 300–430

Languages
- Hebrew (in Israel), Judeo-Tat, Russian

Religion
- Judaism

Related ethnic groups
- Mountain Jews, Ashkenazi Jews.

The Jewish community in Makhachkala consists of Jews who have lived in the territory of modern Makhachkala, a city in the Russian Republic of Dagestan. During the Persian campaign in 1722, Makhachkala hosted a camp for the troops of Russian Emperor Peter I. Both Mountain Jews and Ashkenazi Jews were allowed to settle there.

== History ==
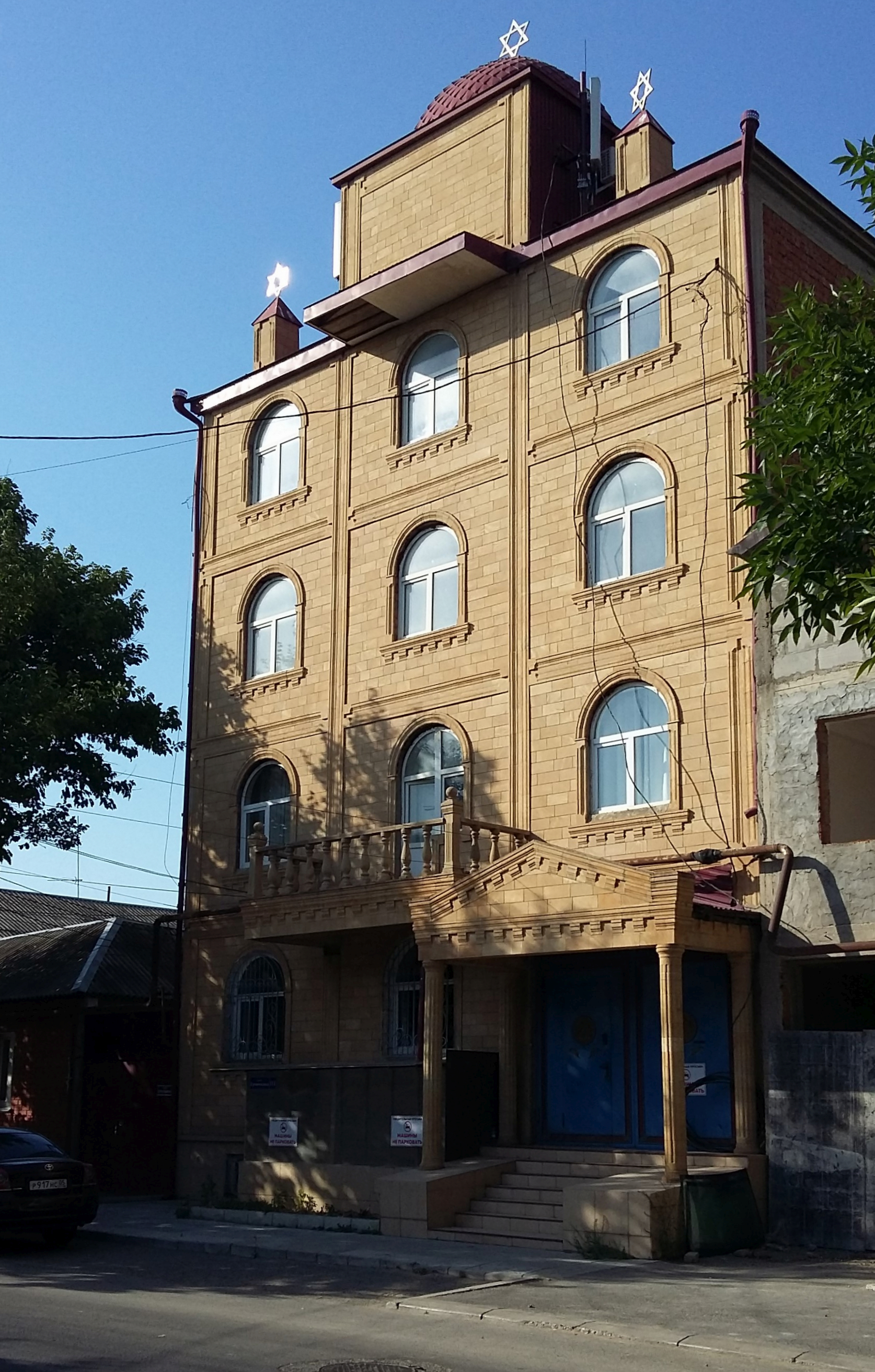
Makhachkala Synagogue. 2022.

=== Khazars ===
During the era of the Khazar Khanate, there was a Khazar settlement in the village of Tarki near Makhachkala. Many Khazar scholars believe that the capital of the Khazar Khanate, the city of Samandar, was located on the site of modern Makhachkala. According to Ibn Hawqal, Jews lived in the city of Samandar in the 10th century and had their own synagogues.

=== Russian empire ===
In 1862, the first synagogue was built in the city, where both Ashkenazi Jews and Mountain Jews, including 61 artisans and 20 soldiers of the local garrison, prayed.

- The city's rabbi in the 1860s was Rabbi Benjamin ben Rabi.
- In 1880, 93 Mountain Jews lived here.
- In 1886, ethnographer Ilya Anisimov recorded 15 Jewish families consisting of 123 people. There was a Jewish school in the city, and Jews owned 4 manufacturing shops and 7 grocery stores.
- In 1890, there were 143-230 Jews living in the city.
- In 1895 there were 436 Jews. There were 2 synagogues.
- According to the 1897 census, 97,000 inhabitants lived in the district, among whom 2,795 were Jews. Makhachkala (then known as Petrovsk) had 9,753 inhabitants, of which 563 were Jews (5.8%).
- In 1899, there were 739 Jews in the area. A school at the synagogue had 9 male students. The rabbi for the Ashkenazi Jews was Abram Movshovich Lozner, and the rabbi for the Mountain Jews was Morduchai Iliazarov.
- In 1910, 379 Jews lived (11.8%), there were 3 synagogues, a Jewish cemetery, and a Jewish public elementary school.
- In 1912, 453 Mountain Jews lived in Makhachkala.
- In 1914, a men's gymnasium was established.
- In 1917, the group "Kings of Zion" was organized.

=== Soviet Union ===
- In 1919, the "House of the Jewish People" opened, where work was carried out among the youth of Mountain and Ashkenazi Jews.
- In the 1920s, a "Judeo-Tat" school operated in the city, with Rabbi Meir Rafailov serving as director until the second half of the decade. There was also a drama club for Mountain Jews. During the same period, under the Soviet Union, two synagogues were closed.
- In 1925, there were 222 Jews in the city.
- In 1926, 3,481 Jews lived in the city, including 2,050 Mountain Jews, making up approximately 11% of Makhachkala’s population. That same year, a Jewish pogrom occurred in Makhachkala, provoked by a blood libel. In the fall, a rumor spread in several villages of Dagestan that Mountain Jews had supposedly killed a Muslim boy (or two) for "ritual purposes." This led to several pogroms in Makhachkala, Derbent, and other populated areas of Dagestan.
- In 1930, a viticultural artel named after Joseph Stalin operated (about 26 farms, including 22 farms of Mountain Jews).
- In 1939, 1,930 Jews lived in the city.
- In 1959, there were 2,692 Jews, including 1,900 Mountain Jews (1.6% of the city's population).
- In 1970, 5,213 Jews (including 1,684 Mountain Jews) and 4 Karaites lived in the city. That year, the synagogue building in Makhachkala was requisitioned, and the community was given a smaller building on the outskirts of the city.
- In 1971, Bobi Iosifovich Ashurov was appointed rabbi.
- In 1979, 4,226 Jews lived in the city.

=== Russia ===
- From 1980 to 2016, Shimi Migirovich Dibiyaev (1928−2021) headed the Jewish community of Makhachkala. Since 2008, he served as the chairman of the Council of Jewish Communities of the Republic of Dagestan, and in 2015, he was appointed honorary chairman of the council.
- In 2016, Valery Shimievich Dibiyaev was elected chairman of the Jewish community of Makhachkala and the chairman of the Council of Jewish Communities of the Republic of Dagestan.
- In the late 1990s, a Hebrew school was opened.

During the Chechen Republic of Ichkeria in 1998−1999, several representatives of the Jewish community were kidnapped for ransom. Many Jews from Makhachkala left for Israel and other countries and regions.

- In 2002, according to the census, there were 430 Jews in the city (0.08%), including 61 Mountain Jews (0.01%) and 417 Muslim Tats (0.08%).
- On the night of December 24, 2007, anti-Semites broke the windows of the synagogue building in Makhachkala. They also desecrated a Jewish cemetery and distributed anti-Jewish leaflets in the 2000s.
- In the 2020s, the city had a synagogue, a Jewish cultural center, a Hebrew school, and a club for older people. According to some sources, the size of the community ranges from 300 to 430 Jews.

Amidst the Gaza war, a group waving Palestinian flags and chanting anti-semitic slogans forcefully entered the Makhachkala airport, looking for Israeli and Jewish travelers arriving on a flight from Tel Aviv. The incident resulted in about 20 injuries, as reported by local health authorities. Passports of some passengers were scrutinized by the crowd.

During the attack in Dagestan on 23 June 2024, Makhachkala's synagogue was set on fire by armed gunmen, possibly affiliated with ISIS.

== Notable Jews of Makhachkala ==
- Eduard Akuvaev (1945-2015), artist
- Hizgil Avshalumov (1913-2001), novelist, poet, playwright
- Mishi Bakhshiev (1910-1972), writer and poet
- Mark Eliyahu, musician
- Iosif Prigozhin, music producer
- Eduard Puterbrot (1940-1993), artist
- Anatoly Yagudaev (1935-2014), sculptor
- Gavril Yushvaev, businessman and investor

== See also ==
- Judeo-Tat
- Judeo-Tat literature
- Judeo-Tat Theatre
- Mountain Jews
- Makhachkala Synagogue
- Judaism in Dagestan
