= History of the Jews in Khasavyurt =

Khasavyurt Jews
יהודי חסוויורט Хасавюртские евреи
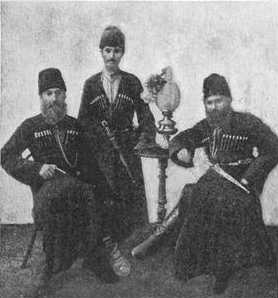

Total population
- 5–10

Languages
- Hebrew (in Israel), Judeo-Tat, Russian

Religion
- Judaism

Related ethnic groups
- Mountain Jews, Ashkenazi Jews.

The Jewish community in Khasavyurt, located in the Russian Republic of Dagestan, is one of the oldest Jewish communities in the cities of the North Caucasus. Jewish presence in Khasavyurt dates back to the time of the Russian Empire.

In the 1830s, the Russian army built a fortress on the right bank of the Yaryksu River, about 80 kilometers from Petrovsk (now Makhachkala). A civilian settlement, which became Khasavyurt, developed around the fortress. Among its early inhabitants were Ashkenazi Jews who had been demobilized from the army, as well as Mountain Jews.

== History ==
Jews remained in the village of Andreyevskaya (now Endirey in the Khasavyurtovsky District) until 1831, when a 7,000-strong detachment led by Kazi-Mulla attacked the settlement. Several Jews were killed or taken prisoner, and their property and shops were looted. After this pogrom, the Jewish residents, along with their families and belongings, fled to the Vnezapnaya fortress across the Aktash River, where they endured a difficult 14-day siege alongside the Russian garrison.

Following these events, the Jews from Andreyevskaya resettled in Kumykia in Khasavyurt and nearby areas. During this period, Shamil’s detachments frequently attacked Jewish settlements — plundering them, killing or capturing inhabitants, and sometimes returning them to their families in exchange for ransom.

In 1860, Khasavyurt was home to 446 families, including 22 Mountain Jews. Mountain Jews from neighboring villages began moving to the town in increasing numbers.

In 1845, the Geli-Bak fortress was established about 15 kilometers from Khasavyurt. It served as army headquarters and a supply base for military units. By 1867, 112 Jews—both Mountain and Ashkenazi—lived there, comprising 27% of the local population. However, by the end of the 19th century, all Mountain Jews had left Geli-Bak.

By 1866–1867, according to Judah Chorny, the number of Mountain Jewish families in Khasavyurt had grown to 40.

In 1874, official records show that 1,280 Jews—both Ashkenazi and Mountain—lived in the town, out of a total population of 3,900. The majority of these Jews were of Ashkenazi origin.

In 1886, the ethnographer Ilya Anisimov recorded 55 Jewish households in Khasavyurt, comprising 207 men and 141 women.

According to the 1897 census, the town had a population of 5,312, including 762 Jews.

During the Russian Civil War, the Jewish community in Khasavyurt suffered a pogrom. In the post-revolutionary years, the number of Jews in the city declined.

In 1931, Khasavyurt was granted city status, which contributed to an influx of Mountain Jews.

During the Great Patriotic War, nearly all Jewish men from Khasavyurt were sent to the front, and many of them died, further reducing the Jewish population.

According to the 1959 census, 300 Mountain Jews lived in the city.

By 1984, approximately 4,000 Jews were reported to be living in Khasavyurt. However, some researchers question the accuracy of this number, suggesting it may have been an overestimate due to inconsistent census categorization.

The synagogue, located in the city center since pre-revolutionary times, was one of the most beautiful buildings in Khasavyurt. It featured a dome, painted ceilings, and stained glass windows. During the Soviet era of state atheism—and for many years after the Great Patriotic War—the building stood empty. Eventually, local authorities repurposed the former synagogue as a sports hall.

The Mountain Jews of Khasavyurt were involved not only in traditional crafts but also in leather tanning. Many worked in factories, industrial plants, and on collective and state farms. Some even held leadership roles in various sectors. Mountain Jews were employed in city administration, as well as in educational, medical, and service institutions.

During the period of perestroika, many Jewish families began to leave Khasavyurt, relocating to other cities and countries.

By 2017, only about two dozen Jewish families remained in Khasavyurt.

== Notable Jews of Khasavyurt ==
- Amaldan Kukullu (1935–2000), writer
- Viktoriya Isakova (b. 1976), actress

== See also ==
- Judaism in Dagestan
- Judeo-Tat
- Judeo-Tat literature
- Judeo-Tat theatre
- Mountain Jews
