= Makhachkala Synagogue =

- Russian: Махачкалинская синагога
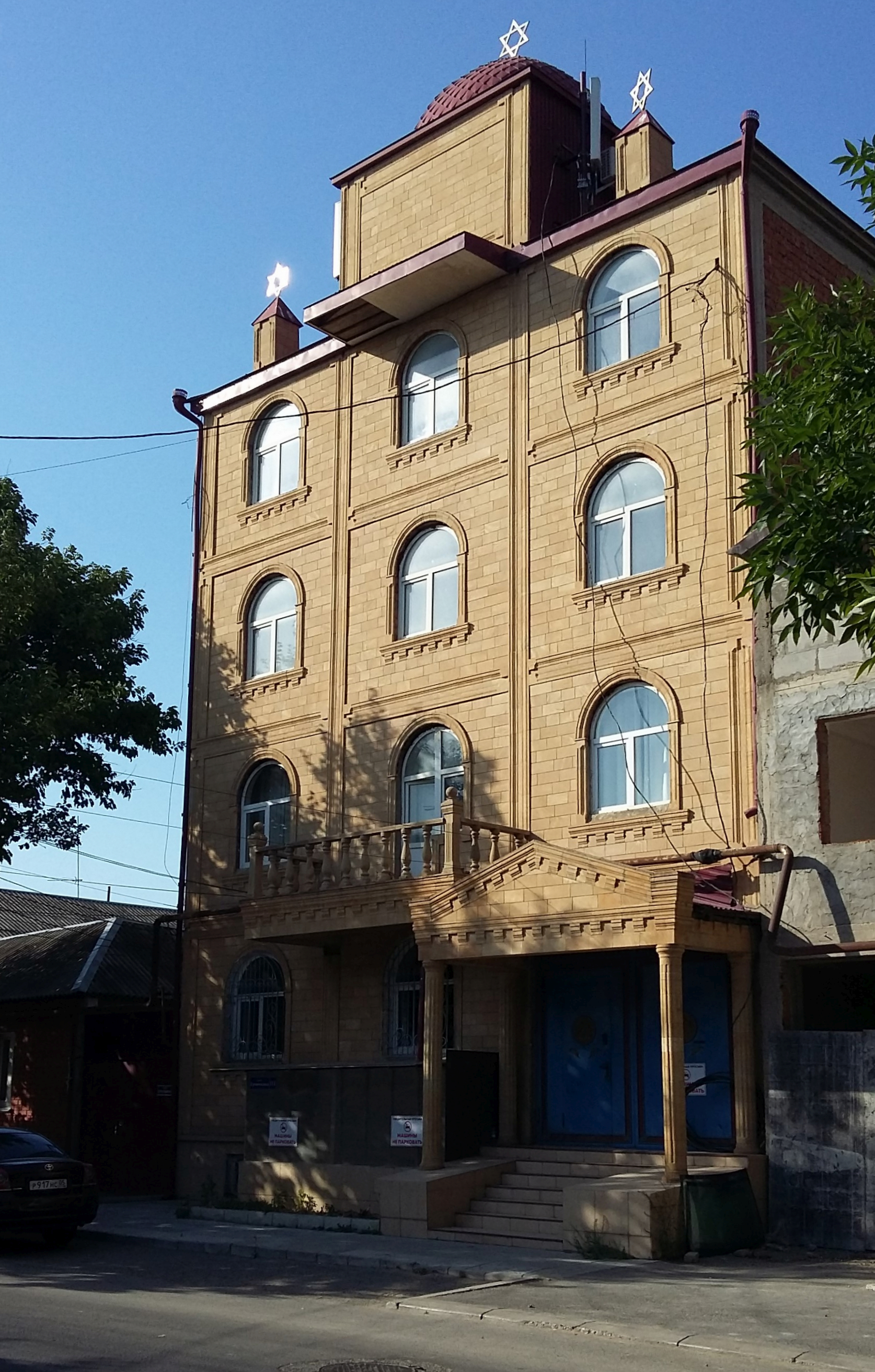

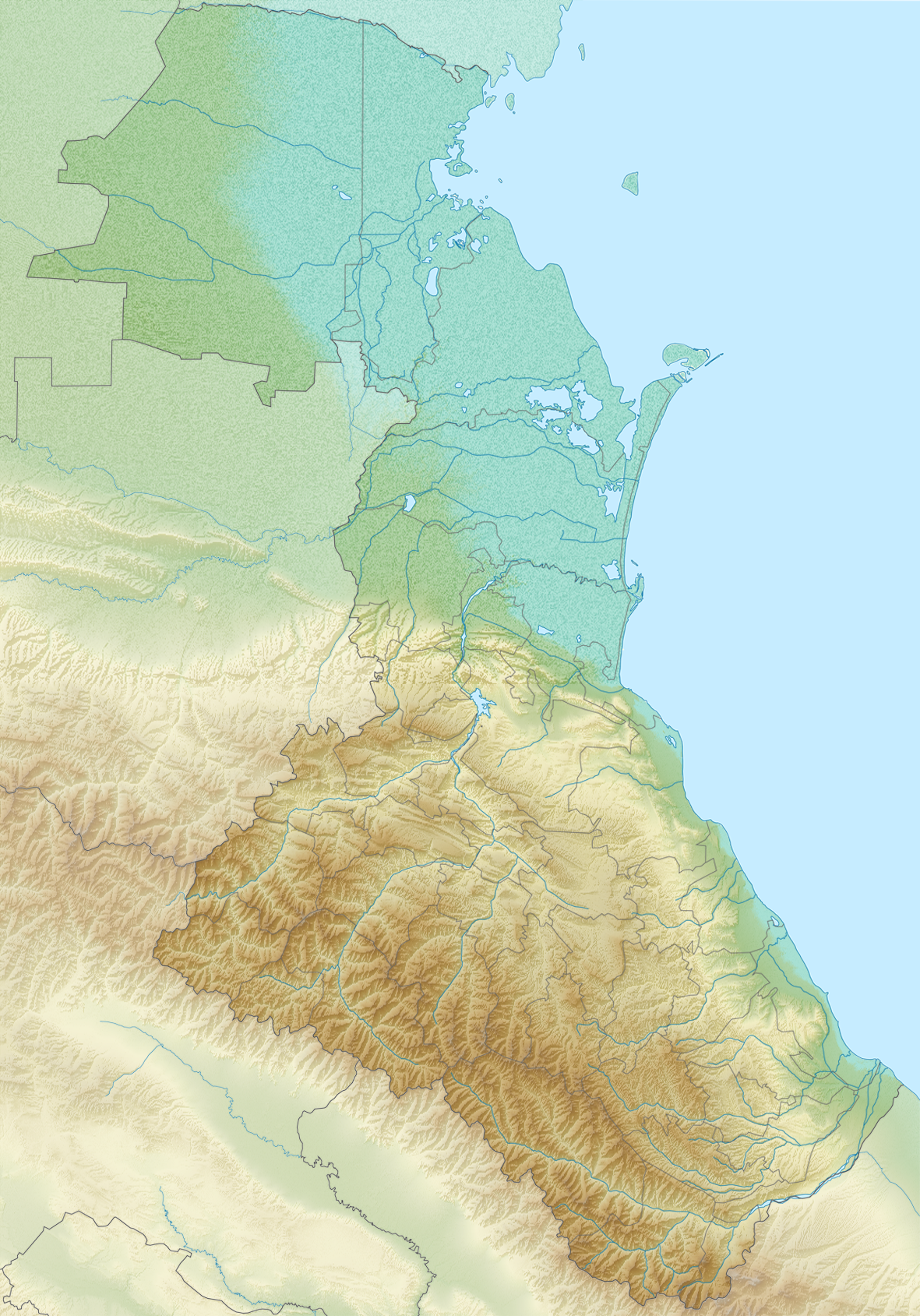
- Location of the active synagogue in Dagestan

Religion
- Affiliation: Orthodox Judaism
- Ecclesiastical or organizational status: Synagogue
- Status: Active

Location
- Location: 111 Ermoshkina Street, Makhachkala, Dagestan, North Caucasus
- Municipality: Makhachkala
- State: Dagestan
- Country: Russia
- Interactive map of Makhachkala Synagogue
- Coordinates: 42°58′26.130″N 47°30′52.139″E

Architecture
- Type: Synagogue architecture
- Funded by: The Jewish congregation
- Established: 2010
- Groundbreaking: 2002
- Completed: 2010
- Materials: Limestone blocks

Makhachkala Synagogue (Russian: Махачкалинская синагога; Hebrew: בית הכנסת במחצ'קלה) is the Orthodox Jewish congregation and synagogue, located at Ermoshkina Street, Building 111, in the city of Makhachkala in the Republic of Dagestan, in the North Caucasus of Russia.

== History ==
In 1862, in the city of Makhachkala, on the initiative of Joseph Pevechevich, a veteran of the Caucasian War in the Imperial Russian Army against Imam Shamil, the first synagogue was built. Both Ashkenazi Jews (including 61 artisans and 20 soldiers of the local garrison) and Mountain Jews prayed there. Rabbi Binyamin was the rabbi of Makhachkala in the 1860s.

In 1895, there were 2 synagogues in Makhachkala.

In 1899, a school (9 male students) operated at the synagogue. The rabbi of the Ashkenazi Jews was Abram Movshovich Lozner, and of the Mountain Jews was Mordukhai Iliazarov.

In 1910, there were 3 synagogues in Makhachkala.

According to various sources, before the Russian Revolution in 1917, the number of synagogues in Makhachkala varied from three to seven, but they were all confiscated by the Soviet authorities.

In the 1920s, two synagogues were closed. One of the synagogues was on Lenin Street, but the city authorities closed it, and later the synagogue was torn down. Despite this, the Jews in Makhachkala still quietly gathered for prayers in secret from the government authorities.

In 1970, the synagogue building in Makhachkala was requisitioned, and the community was given a smaller building on the outskirts of the city. Since 1971, the city's rabbi was B. I. Ashurov.

In 1976, the city's Jewish community bought the entire house at 111 Ermoshkina Street, paying 9,800 rubles for it. Previously, there was nothing in the purchased house except for sheds. The synagogue congregants themselves built and renovated the building and painted its walls.

Between the 1930s and 1970s, there were two synagogues in Makhachkala. The Mountain Jewish Synagogue was located at 62 Markov Street. It had a school for boys and girls, where Rabbi Yerukham Abramov, son of Rabbi Hanuka, taught the senior classes, and Rabbi Livi Natanov, son of Neten, taught the junior classes.

The second synagogue was located at 25 Makhach Dakhadaev Street. It was mostly attended by Ashkenazi Jews.

In 2002, construction began on a four-story synagogue on the same plot of land. It was built primarily with funds from donations and charitable assistance from the Jews of Makhachkala. Since 2004, the government of Dagestan, under former presidents Magomedali Magomedov and then Mukhu Aliyev, allocated funds for the construction of the synagogue, which helped complete the construction in 2010.

A kosher kitchen and dining room for 280 people are situated on the lower floor. On the first floor is the synagogue office; on the second floor, there is a spacious prayer hall with six Torah scrolls. On the third floor, there is a Jewish school. On the fourth floor is a hotel.

From 2022 to 2023, the rabbi of the Makhachkala synagogue was Rami Davydov.

Since 2023, prayers have been held under the leadership of the hazzan, Sultan Alkhazov.

On the night of December 24, 2007, anti-Semites broke the windows of the synagogue building in Makhachkala.

On June 23, 2024, during an attack in Dagestan, armed militants possibly affiliated with ISIS set fire to the Makhachkala synagogue. The building was partially damaged, but the synagogue is still operational.

== Names of Rabbis ==
List of those who served as rabbis in the Makhachkala synagogue from 1930 to 2001:

- Bobi Iosifovich Ashurov, also known as Rabbi Bobi (1895-1991)
- Eruhom ben Rabbi Hanukkah
- Hudodot ben Isuf
- Gurshum ben Rabbi Isog bokui
- Isroil ben Mushoil
- Livi ben Neten
- Gamei ben Israil
- Evie ben Ihanon
- Yashagie ben Ruvin
- Iev ben Oftum
- Metetiye ben Nuvah
- Ilyev ben Rabi Hanukkah
- Iftach ben Rabbi Evediye
- Ovrohom ben Nahum
- Donil ben Guillod
- Zovolu ben Rabbi Ilyevu
- Agivo ben David
- Isuf ben Rabbi Donil
- Mihir ben Nissim
- Chaim ben Ulmes
- Alchos ben Shemei
- Mihir ben Rabbi Yaangil
- Menashir ben Shemei
- Ifiel ben Oshir Gubei
- Ilyevu ben Zowolu
- Bieniemy ben rabbi Evidie
- Honuh ben Avdalim
- Juno ben Besendel
- Ihanon ben Zokoy Uriel
- Odom ben Mukhoiel.

== See also ==
- History of the Jews in Makhachkala
- Judaism in Dagestan
- History of the Jews in Russia
- List of synagogues in Russia
