= Dzhufudag =

Mountain in Dagestan, Russia

- Location within Caucasus Mountains

Highest point
- Elevation: 3,015 m (9,892 ft)
- Coordinates: 41°54′43″N 47°40′08″E

Naming
- Native name: Джуфудаг (Russian)

Geography
- Location: Agulsky District
- Country: Russia
- Region: Dagestan
- Parent range: Caucasus Mountains

Dzhufudag is a mountain in the Agulsky District of the Republic of Dagestan.

Height - 3015 meters. The summit is located on the border of the Tabasaran, Khivsky, Agulsky and near the ridge of the Kaytagsky District.

At a certain period, the mountain was a cult center for the inhabitants of a part of Southern Dagestan - Tabasarans, Aghuls and Kaitags. On the mountain in late spring and early summer, crowded holidays were held, and the reason for this was the collection of wild garlic (an analogue of the flower festival).
