= June 2024 Sevastopol missile attack =

Part of the Russo-Ukrainian War

- Part of the Russo-Ukrainian War
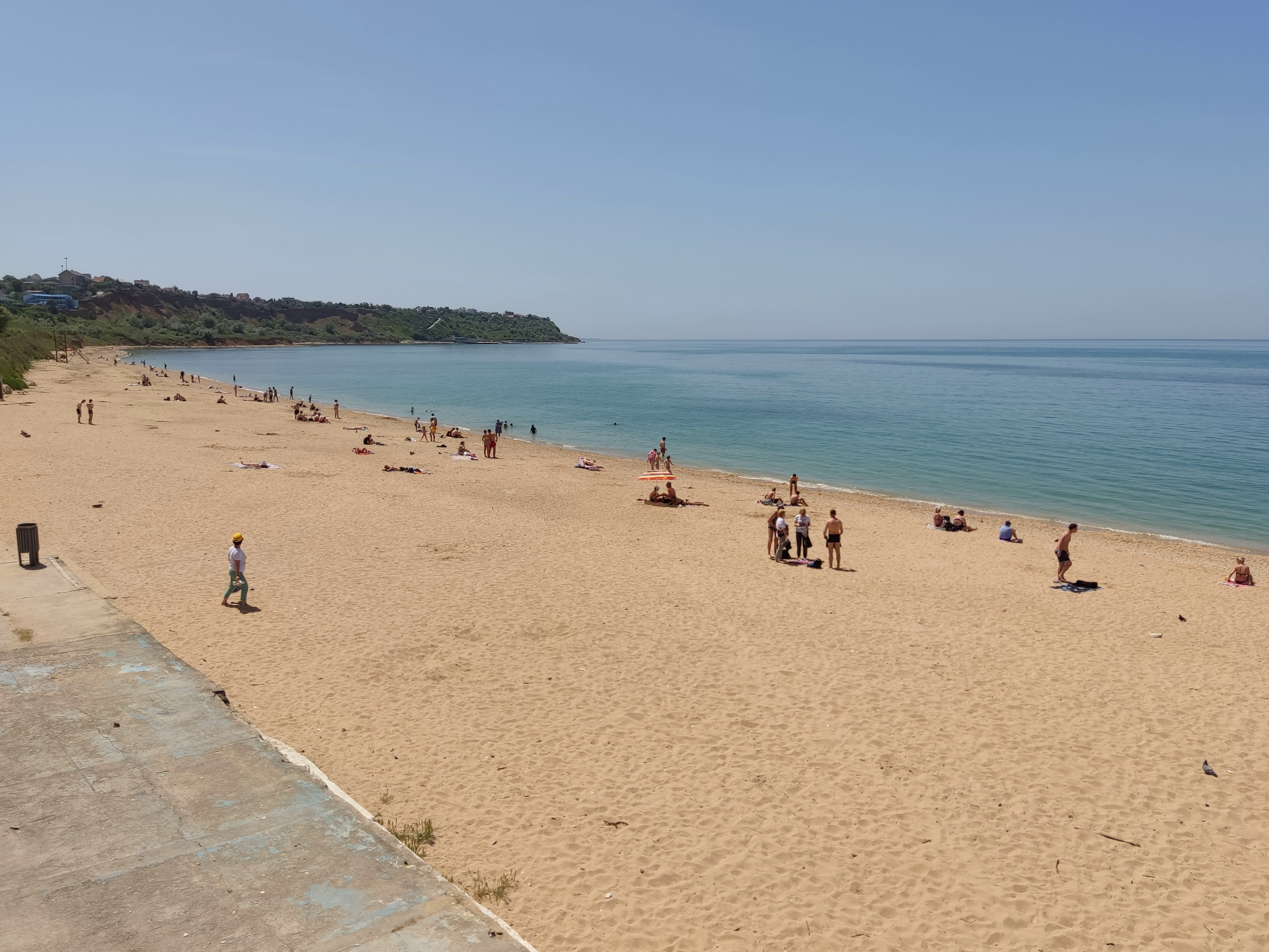
- The beach in Uchkuyevka, 2022
- Location: Sevastopol, Crimea
- Date: 23 June 2024
- Attack type: Missile strike
- Weapon: fragments of the ATACMS missile
- Deaths: 4 (2 children)
- Injuries: 151

On 23 June 2024, according to the Russian Ministry of Defence fragments from a US-provided Ukrainian ATACMS missile that was shot down by a Russian anti-air system fell over a beach in Sevastopol, Crimea. The submunitions mostly exploded in the sea, as well as along the shore of the beaches at Uchkuyivka and Lyubimovka on the northern outskirts of Sevastopol. According to Russian authorities, the attack killed four people and injured around 151 others.

== Attack ==
External videos
- The fragments falls of the ATACMS missile on the beach of Sevastopol

According to the Russian Ministry of Defence, four ATACMS rockets loaded with submunitions, which were provided to Ukraine by the United States, were intercepted over Sevastopol, while the fragments of the fifth missile fell on the city and on the beaches in the Uchkuyivka and Lyubimovka areas.

Eyewitnesses reported that air raid sirens were not active during the attack. Video taken at the beach where the missile fragments fell showed people running from falling debris, while some were being carrying the wounded.

== Casualties ==
According Mikhail Razvozhayev, the governor of Russian-annexed Sevastopol, as of the evening of June 23, four people died in the attack, including two children. A total of 144 people sought medical attention, 82 of whom required hospitalization. Among the dead was the daughter of the deputy mayor of Magadan. According to various sources, up to 151 people were injured, including 27 children.

== Reactions ==
=== Russia ===
On June 24, the Russian authorities in Sevastopol declared a day of mourning in memory of those killed in the missile strike.

Kremlin Press Secretary Dmitry Peskov told reporters that the "involvement of the United States, the direct involvement, as a result of which Russian civilians are killed, cannot be without consequences".

Mikhail Razvozhayev, particularly emphasized that the strike occurred on the holiday of Trinity, when peaceful people were returning from work or had gone to the sea with their children. Razvozhayev tried to link the strike on Sevastopol to the terrorist attacks in Dagestan. On June 27, following a special meeting, Razvozhayev stated that the occupational administration does not plan to close the beaches in Sevastopol, only recommending that people refrain from visiting the beaches on Sevastopol’s North Side, which, according to Razvozhayev, do not have shelters.

The Russian Ministry of Defence accused the United States of being directly responsible for the attack, stating "All flight missions for the American ATACMS operational-tactical missiles are entered by American specialists based on U.S.’ own satellite reconnaissance data".

The Investigative Committee of Russia opened a criminal case as "terrorist act".

=== Ukraine ===
Mykhailo Podolyak, adviser to the head of the Presidential Office, stated that the Armed Forces of Ukraine will continue to strike Crimea, because, in his view, there are and can be no "beaches", "tourist zones", or other fictitious signs of "peaceful life", since the peninsula is occupied territory where full-scale war continues.

=== USA ===
The Pentagon spokesman Major Charlie Dietz said that Kyiv independently chooses targets when striking Russia.

== Responsibility ==
The Russian Ministry of Defence "acknowledged that a Russian air defense interceptor caused the Ukrainian missile to deviate from its flight path and detonate in Sevastopol." "... the civilian casualties in Crimea resulted from Russia's interception of an incoming ATACMS missile rather than a deliberate Ukrainian targeting decision."

Reuters reported that, according to an US official, the ATACMS missile was targeting a Russian missile launcher.

According to Open-source intelligence researchers, the air defence launcher which was presumably targeting the ATACMS was set up on another Sevastopol beach near Radiogorka.

== Memorial ==
In the summer of 2025, a memorial chapel for the victims was opened in Uchkuyivka Park.

== See also ==
- Attacks in Russia during the Russian invasion of Ukraine
