= 2024 Dagestan attacks =

Mass shooting and explosion in Russia

- Part of Islamic State insurgency in the North Caucasus, terrorism in Russia and Islamic terrorism in Europe
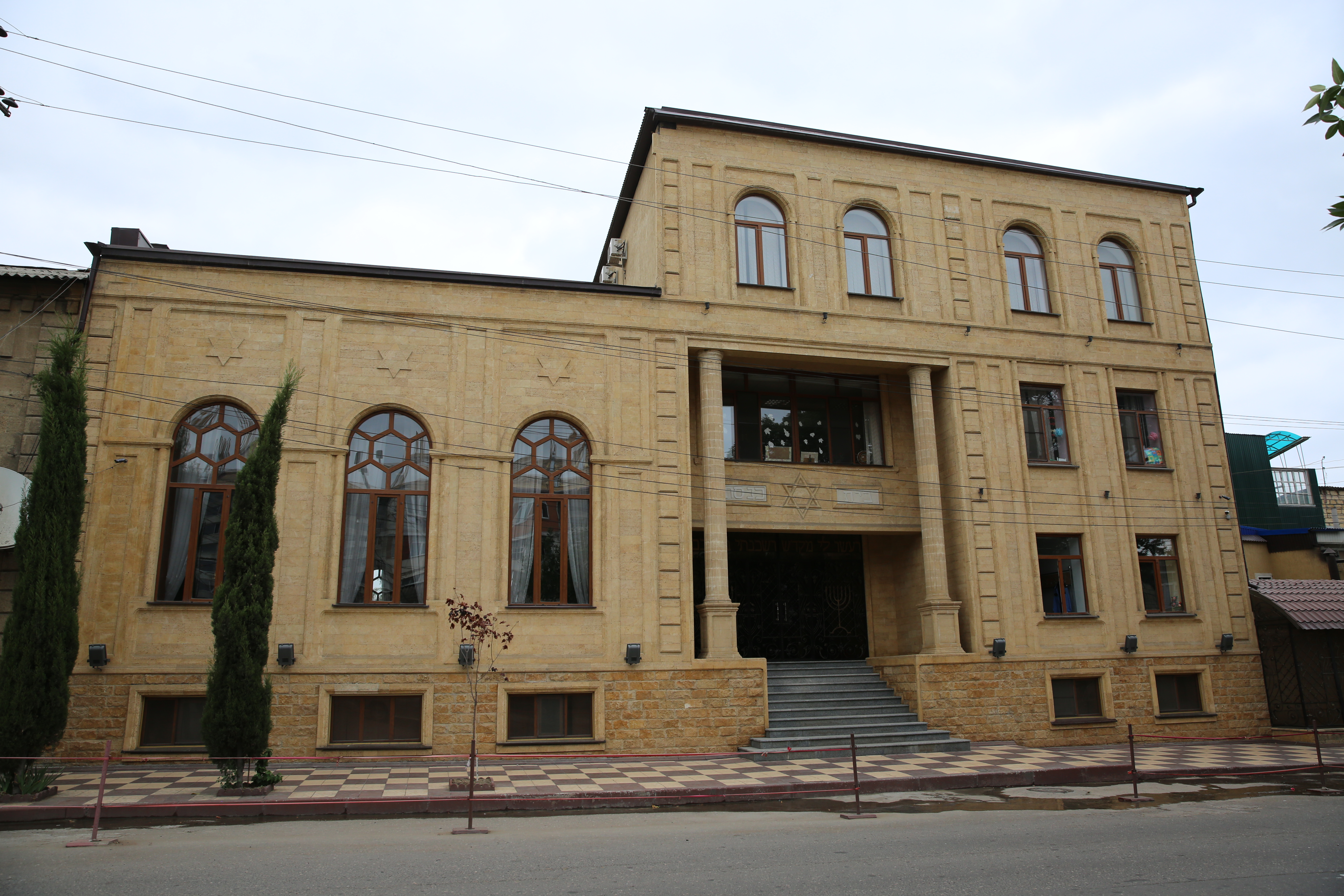
- The Kele-Numaz Synagogue in Derbent, which was almost completely destroyed by fire as a result of the attacks
- Location: Derbent, Sergokala and Makhachkala, Dagestan, Russia
- Date: 23 June 2024; 2 years ago c. 18:00–23:00 (MSK)
- Target: Two churches, two synagogues, and a road police post
- Attack type: Mass shooting; spree shooting; arson
- Weapons: Automatic weapons and Molotov cocktails
- Deaths: 27 (including 5 perpetrators, 17 law enforcement officers, 5 civilians)
- Injuries: 46
- Perpetrator: Islamic State-inspired
- No. of participants: At least 6
- Motive: Islamic Statism; Islamic extremism Anti-Christian Sentiment; Antisemitism

On 23 June 2024, coordinated attacks were launched in the cities of Derbent and Makhachkala in the Russian republic of Dagestan in the North Caucasus. Two synagogues, two Eastern Orthodox churches, and a traffic police post were attacked simultaneously with automatic weapons and Molotov cocktails. It was reported that 17 police officers and five civilians were killed along with all five attackers. The fatalities included a priest, Nikolay Kotelnikov. The Kele-Numaz Synagogue was nearly completely destroyed by fire in the attack.

Russian authorities designated the attack as an act of terrorism. Russian media reported that five of the perpetrators were identified by authorities, including one son and two nephews of Magomed Omarov, the head of Dagestan's Sergokalinsky District. Omarov later submitted a resignation letter and was detained for questioning. One of the attackers was a former president of the Sergokala section of the A Just Russia – For Truth Party.

Russian President Vladimir Putin offered condolences to the victims of the attacks. The government of Dagestan declared a three-day national mourning period from 24 to 26 June for those killed in the attacks.

== Background ==
The North Caucasus region of southern Russia has been embroiled in conflict since the 1990s. This predominantly Muslim-populated area experienced two significant wars involving the separatist Chechen republic from 1994 to 2000. Following the Chechen wars, a series of terrorist attacks and clashes between Russian and Islamist forces persisted into the 2010s. Since 2017, the North Caucasus has seen a resurgence of violence, attributed to the Islamic State. In 2015 the group announced that it had established a "franchise" in the North Caucasus.

The Jewish community of Derbent, a part of the Jewish diaspora known as the Mountain Jews, dates back to the 6th century, when Persian Jews (who had emigrated to Persia after the destruction of the First Temple in Jerusalem) settled in Derbent along the Silk Road trade route. Since the outbreak of the Gaza war in October 2023, Russia's Jewish community has faced increasing threats of violence. On 28 and 29 October of the same year, antisemitic riots broke out in the Muslim-majority regions of the Northern Caucasus, including in Dagestan.

In March 2024, an attack at a Moscow concert hall, which was claimed by the Islamic State, killed 151 people; the following month, Russia's FSB security service arrested four people in Dagestan suspected of involvement in the attack. This was the deadliest attack in Russia since the Beslan school siege in 2004.

== Attacks ==
=== Derbent ===
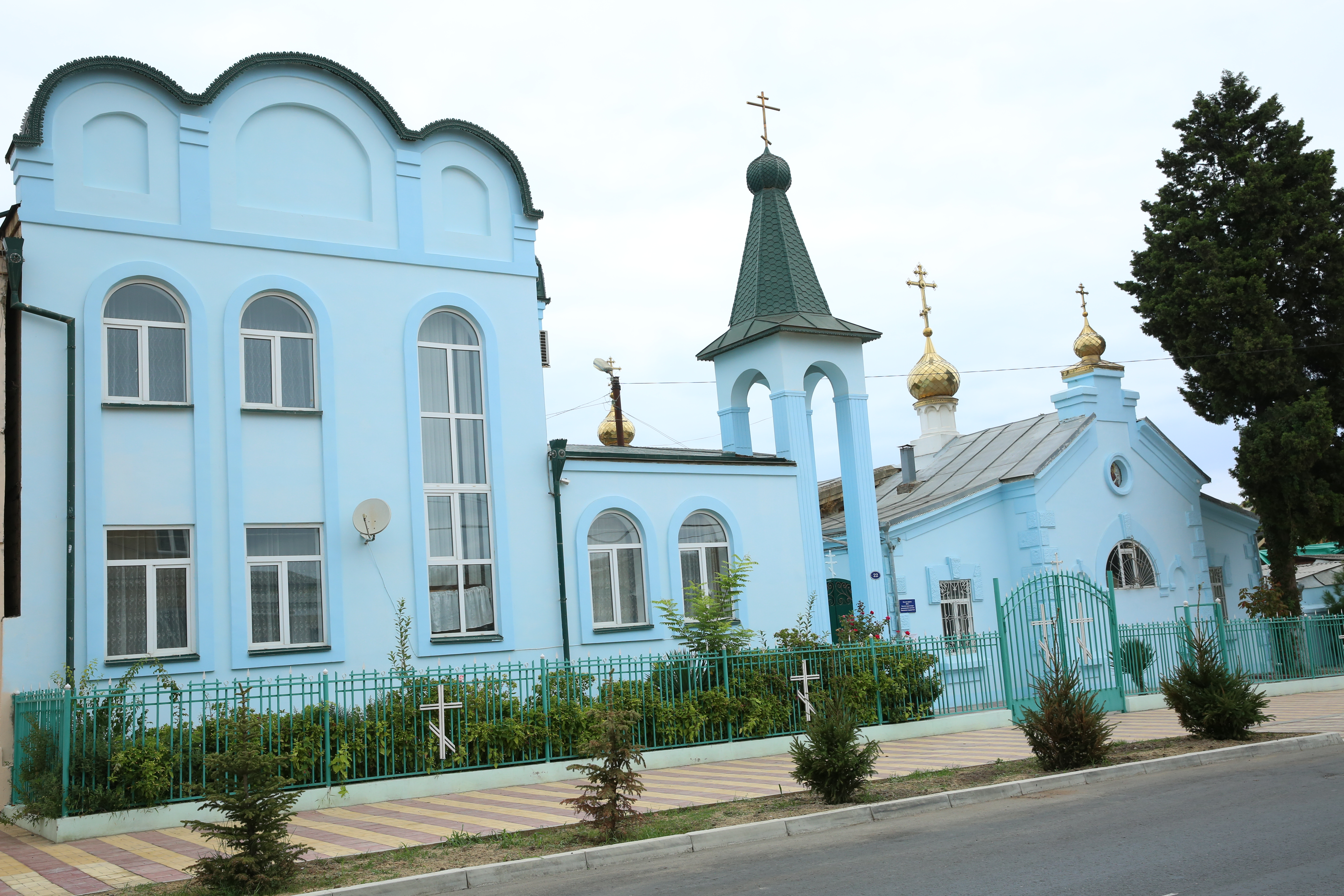
Church of the Intercession of the Holy Virgin in Derbent

On the evening of 23 June 2024, shortly before 18:00 local time, an attack was launched at the Orthodox Church of the Intercession of the Holy Virgin on Lenin Street in Derbent, Dagestan's second-largest city, by attackers with rifles, automatic weapons, and Molotov cocktails. The attackers reportedly broke into the church shortly after its holiday Sunday evening service; other clergy at the church managed to lock themselves in safely, and were later rescued. The church's security guard, armed only with a non-lethal gas pistol, was shot and killed by the attackers.

The attackers killed the 66-year-old archpriest, set an icon of the church ablaze, and set the church on fire. The priest was identified as Father Nikolay Kotelnikov, who had served the Church of the Intercession of the Holy Virgin in Derbent for over four decades and was killed there by the attackers. Initially, it was reported that his throat had been slit, however, according to his son-in-law, he had first been shot and then stabbed.

It was one of two churches that were attacked during one of the most important holidays in the Eastern Orthodox calendar, Pentecost Sunday in the Russian Orthodox Church, reportedly as attackers yelled "Allahu Akbar".

At approximately the same time, in addition to the church, the Derbent Kele-Numaz Synagogue, which had been established in 1914, was fired upon with automatic weapons, and set on fire by the attackers. Telegram users posted videos showing police cars being shot at, and the synagogue on fire. Afterwards a video was posted to Telegram by Melikov showing the remains of the synagogue, which was almost completely destroyed by the fire.

The attackers fled in a white Volkswagen Polo. Nineteen people sought shelter in the church before being rescued.

=== Makhachkala ===
Almost simultaneously with the attacks in Derbent, attacks were launched against targets in Makhachkala, Dagestan's capital and largest city, about 75 miles (125 kilometers) away.

A fire was started in a synagogue on Ermoshkina Street in Makhachkala. The fire was later extinguished, and no victims were reported. The militants also simultaneously attacked the Cathedral of the Assumption, another Russian Orthodox church.

At the same time, unknown militants also fired at a traffic police post in Makhachkala and forced people out of their cars. A video showed militants in black clothing in Makhachkala shooting at passing police cars with machine guns.

At approximately 19:00 local time, the Ministry of Internal Affairs posted a video showing the attackers firing at police officers on Magomedgadzhiev Street in Makhachkala. The faces of several militants were visible in the footage.

=== Sergokala ===
In the evening, unidentified gunmen opened fire on a police car in the square in the center of the village of Sergokala when the police arrived to detain the head of Sergokalinsky District, Magomed Omarov, whose two sons and nephew participated in the terrorist attack in Makhachkala. One police officer was wounded.

== Victims ==
The total fatalities reported were 17 police officers and five civilians, along with at least five perpetrators. At least 46 others were injured in the attacks, including 13 police officers. Four of the injured police officers were described as being in "grave" condition.

== Perpetrators ==
Authorities said that four attackers were killed by police in Makhachkala, while others were killed in Derbent. While some of the attackers initially fled in a car, authorities said all five were later killed.

The attackers who were killed were subsequently identified. Russian media reported that several relatives of Magomed Omarov, the head of Dagestan's Sergokalinsky District, were among the perpetrators of the attacks. They were identified as:

- Osman Omarov, 31, son of Magomed Omarov
- Abdusamad Amadziev, 32, nephew of Magomed Omarov
- Gadzhimurad Kagirov, 28, an MMA fighter with Eagles MMA (a club owned by Khabib Nurmagomedov), student of Abdulmanap Nurmagomedov
- Dalgat Daudov, 42 or 43 years old, head of a building cooperative, and coworker of the Omarov brothers in another building cooperative
- Ali Zakarigaev, 35, former president of the Sergokala section of the A Just Russia – For Truth party (until 2022), and nephew of Magomed Omarov

Osman Omarov, Amadziev, and Daudov were the perpetrators of the attack in Makhachkala; Zakarigaev and Kagirov were the perpetrators of the attack in Derbent. Radio Free Europe reported that the attackers may be part of the Mekegin clan, a group with ties to the Dagestani leadership.

Magomed Omarov himself submitted a resignation letter and was subsequently detained and questioned by the Russian Federal Security Service. Later, Omarov was expelled from the United Russia party, the ruling political party in Russia, "for actions that discredit United Russia". On 24 June, Sergey Melikov officially dismissed Omarov from his post. Melikov said that he would not comment on the degree of Omarov's involvement but said "if his participation is confirmed, then there will be full responsibility". Omarov was then arrested for 10 days on charges of "minor hooliganism"; Russian media reports state that he may face terrorism charges. Another son of Omarov, 37-year-old Adil Omarov, was detained by police.

Russia's state-run news agency TASS said the attackers were "followers of an international terrorist organization" and that law enforcement officials were identifying their handlers and organizers, but failed to name the organization. Many militants from Dagestan traveled to join the Islamic State in Syria and Iraq, and in 2015 the group declared that it had established a "franchise" in the North Caucasus. Dagestan governor Melikov blamed members of Islamic "sleeper cells" directed from abroad. ISKP praised the attackers as "brothers in the Caucasus who showed that they are still strong".

SITE Intelligence Group linked the attack to "IS" (the Islamic State militant cult).

== Aftermath ==
The Russian anti-terrorism agency said on 24 June that the "anti-terror operation" launched earlier against the perpetrators ended after it killed five of the gunmen in Dagestan.

The government of Dagestan declared a three-day national mourning period from 24 to 26 June for those killed in the attacks. On these days of mourning, national flags were to be flown throughout the territory of the republic. Cultural institutions and television and radio companies in Dagestan were to cancel all their entertainment events and programs. Sergei Melikov also ordered an "inspection and scrutinization of the personal records of all those in leadership positions" in Dagestan.

Kotelnikov was buried on 26 June on the grounds of the Church of the Intercession of the Holy Virgin, where he had served since 1979. Tens of mourners of diverse faiths attended the funeral.

== Reactions ==
Patriarch Kirill, the head of the Russian Orthodox Church, said it was "no coincidence" that the attack took place on the day Orthodox Christians observe Pentecost. He said that "the enemy is not giving up on attempts to destroy interreligious peace and harmony within our society."

Russian President Vladimir Putin offered condolences to the victims of the attacks. He bestowed the Order of Courage on Kotelnikov and the dead police officers; the other police officers involved received Medals "for Bravery", and the guard of the church posthumously received the Medal "for Valour" (Russian: Медаль «За отвагу»). According to his press secretary, Dmitry Peskov, Putin does not plan to make a special address regarding the Dagestan attacks.

Tatyana Moskalkova, Russia's commissioner for human rights, condemned the perpetrators of the attacks, and expressed condolences for those affected. The head of Ingushetia, Mahmud-Ali Kalimatov, claimed that the terrorist attacks and a Ukrainian bombing in Sevastopol that occurred on the same day were linked together as attempts by "enemies" to destabilize the country. Head of the Committee on International Affairs of the State Duma Leonid Slutsky wrote on Telegram that the attacks were planned from outside Russia for the purpose of "sowing panic and dividing the Russian people", and also connected it to the attack on Sevastopol. Member of the People's Assembly of the Republic of Dagestan Abdulkhakim Gadzhiyev posted on Telegram that there was "no doubt" that the intelligence services of Ukraine and NATO countries were connected to the attacks. At the same time, Federal Senator Dmitry Rogozin called for not considering the terrorist attack as "the machinations of Ukraine and NATO", since, in his opinion, if all such attacks are explained in this way, it will lead to problems. President of Chechnya Ramzan Kadyrov called the attack an attempt to cause "discord between faiths". The head of A Just Russia - For Truth, Sergey Mironov, proposed the death sentence for terrorists.

The Israeli foreign ministry and the Federation of Jewish Communities of Russia said that the synagogue of Derbent had been "burned to the ground". According to Khizri Abakarov, senator Suleiman Kerimov promised to finance the restoration of the damaged churches and synagogues, and to pay 5 million rubles each to the families of the deceased.

Harold Chambers, a political and security analyst specializing in the North Caucasus, said that the Russian authorities "were definitely caught off guard by this attack," adding that the incident showed a "disconnect between Russian counterterrorism capability and what the terrorists capability is inside of Russia." Tanya Lokshina of Human Rights Watch called the attack "a giant failure of the [Russian] intelligence agencies."

== See also ==
- 2024 Karabulak clash
- Kizlyar church shooting, 2018 attack at an Orthodox church in Dagestan during the Sunday of Forgiveness holiday
- Rostov-on-Don pre-trial detention center hostage crisis
- History of the Jews in Derbent
- History of the Jews in Makhachkala
