= 2023 antisemitic riots in the North Caucasus =

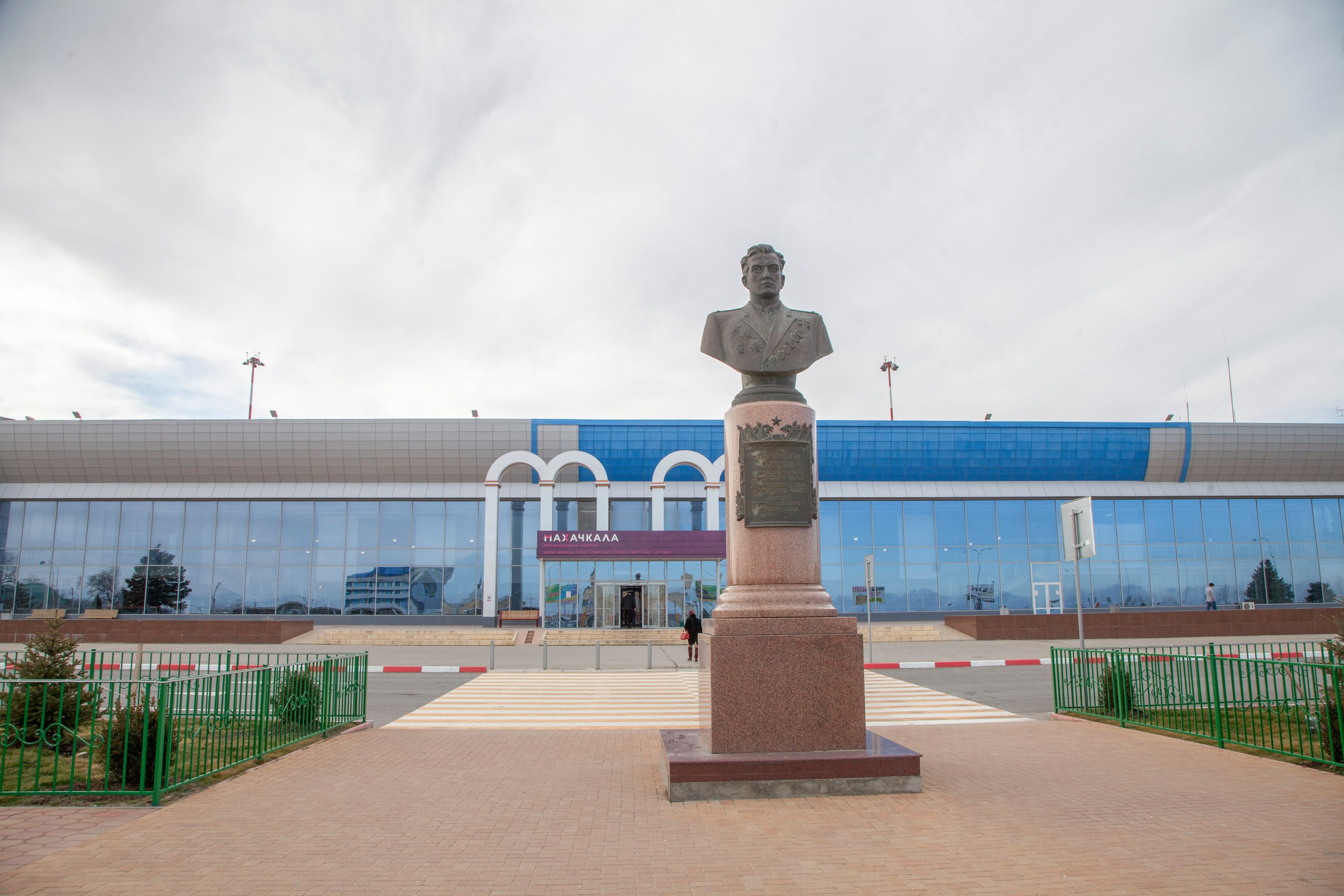
- Uytash Airport, where antisemitic rioters gathered
- Location: Northern Caucasus regions, Russia
- Date: 28 and 29 October 2023
- Attack type: Riot/Pogrom
- Injuries: 20 (on 29 October 2023)
- Motive: Gaza war; Antisemitism; Islamic radicalism

Towards the end of October 2023, several violent antisemitic riots occurred in the North Caucasus region of Russia. The riots occurred during the Gaza war, a conflict which caused an increase in antisemitic incidents in various parts of the world.

== Background ==
A few days before the events at Makhachkala Airport, local Telegram channels circulated calls to participate in the gathering at the airport. Messages about "refugees from Israel" arriving in Dagestan were published by the "Morning Dagestan" Telegram channel, which was launched by Russian-Ukrainian politician Ilya Ponomarev. Previously, the same Telegram channel organized the 2022 North Caucasian protests.

== Timeline ==
=== 28 October ===
==== Khasavyurt ====
Residents of Khasavyurt, Dagestan, gathered near the Flamingo Hotel after reports that refugees from Israel were being accommodated there. The protesters demanded that all hotel residents come to the windows to look at them. When the guests did not do this, stones were thrown into the building. Those gathered shouted "Allahu Akbar" and demanded to check the basements and let them into the hotel. Police arrived and allowed protesters to check the hotel to make sure it was "Jew-free". After this, a message was posted outside the hotel that Jews were prohibited from entering.

==== Cherkessk ====
An antisemitic rally was held in Cherkessk, the capital of Karachay-Cherkessia, demanding "the eviction of ethnic Jews".

=== 29 October ===
==== Nalchik ====
In Nalchik, the capital of Kabardino-Balkaria, a local Jewish religious national-cultural community center under construction was set on fire, with the attackers writing "death to the Yahuds" on its wall.

==== Makhachkala Airport ====
A mob stormed Uytash Airport near Makhachkala, Dagestan, after the arrival of a Red Wings flight from Tel Aviv. Messages spread on Telegram that a direct flight from Israel was arriving in Dagestan, with calls to come to the airport and prevent the plane from landing. While Russian-language news website Meduza said that the crowd was made up of "local residents," Israeli Channel 12 reported that most of the people in the crowd were Palestinian expatriates.

As indicated on the airport website, the plane from Tel Aviv landed at 19:17 local time. After this, dozens of protesters stormed the airport and reached the runway, some of whom, according to Izvestia, managed to climb up onto the plane's wings. 20 people were injured, among them nine police officers, of whom two were injured seriously. The passengers on the plane were unharmed. 150 suspects were identified, while 60 were detained. The Russian civilian aviation agency Rosaviatsia announced the airport's closure tentatively until 6 November, but it re-opened on 30 October. By the evening of that day, the number of detained increased to 83. On 5 November, the number of detained was reported to be 201, with 155 of them charged.

== Reactions ==
=== Domestic ===
The head of Dagestan, Sergey Melikov, called the incident a gross violation of the law, although Dagestanis "sympathize with the suffering of the victims of the actions of unrighteous people and politicians and pray for peace in Palestine". Ovadia Isakov, the rabbi of Derbent, reportedly home to the largest Jewish population in Dagestan, was quoted as saying "The situation in Dagestan is very dire,” and that “The [Jewish] community is very frightened ... there is no place to run.”

Regional leaders from two other regions of the North Caucasus called for calm. The main Mufti of Dagestan made a similar appeal. The head of Chechnya, Ramzan Kadyrov ordered the Interior Ministry and the National Guard to detain would-be demonstrators in the republic and authorized them to open fire.

Russian war correspondent Alexander Kots suggested that "those who want to kill Jews should go to Gaza or Kyiv. I know the address of one, I can tell you: Bankova, 11".

President Vladimir Putin ordered a meeting of his top security officials, while his spokesperson Dmitry Peskov blamed the unrest on "outside interference". Putin blamed Ukraine for being a main influence for the antisemitism.

Due to concerns over the sensitive nature of their cases, the trials of 140 suspected participants in the riots were moved to Krasnodar and Stavropol krais. In November 2023, a court in Dagestan sentenced 15 participants in the airport attack to between two and ten days' imprisonment, while in August 2024, a court in Armavir sentenced five people to up to nine years' imprisonment for their role in the riots.

=== International ===
US presidential spokesperson Adrienne Watson condemned the riots. Canadian Prime Minister Justin Trudeau also condemned the events as "deeply disturbing". Stefan de Keersmaecker, a spokesperson for the European Commission, also condemned the attacks.

The Israeli government called on Russian authorities to protect Israelis and Jews in Russia.

Ukrainian President Volodymyr Zelenskyy, who is of Jewish descent, blamed Russia's "widespread culture of hatred towards other peoples, which is propagated by state television, experts and authorities", for the events.

Human Rights Watch characterized the Russian response as inadequate, stating that "instead of cracking down on critics, authorities should focus efforts on preventing xenophobic attacks".

== See also ==
- Antisemitism during the Gaza war
- Antisemitism in Russia
- Violent incidents in reaction to the Gaza war
- History of the Jews in Makhachkala
- 2024 Dagestan attacks
