= Derbent Synagogue =

Destroyed synagogue in the city of Derbent, Russia

- Russian: Дербентская синагога
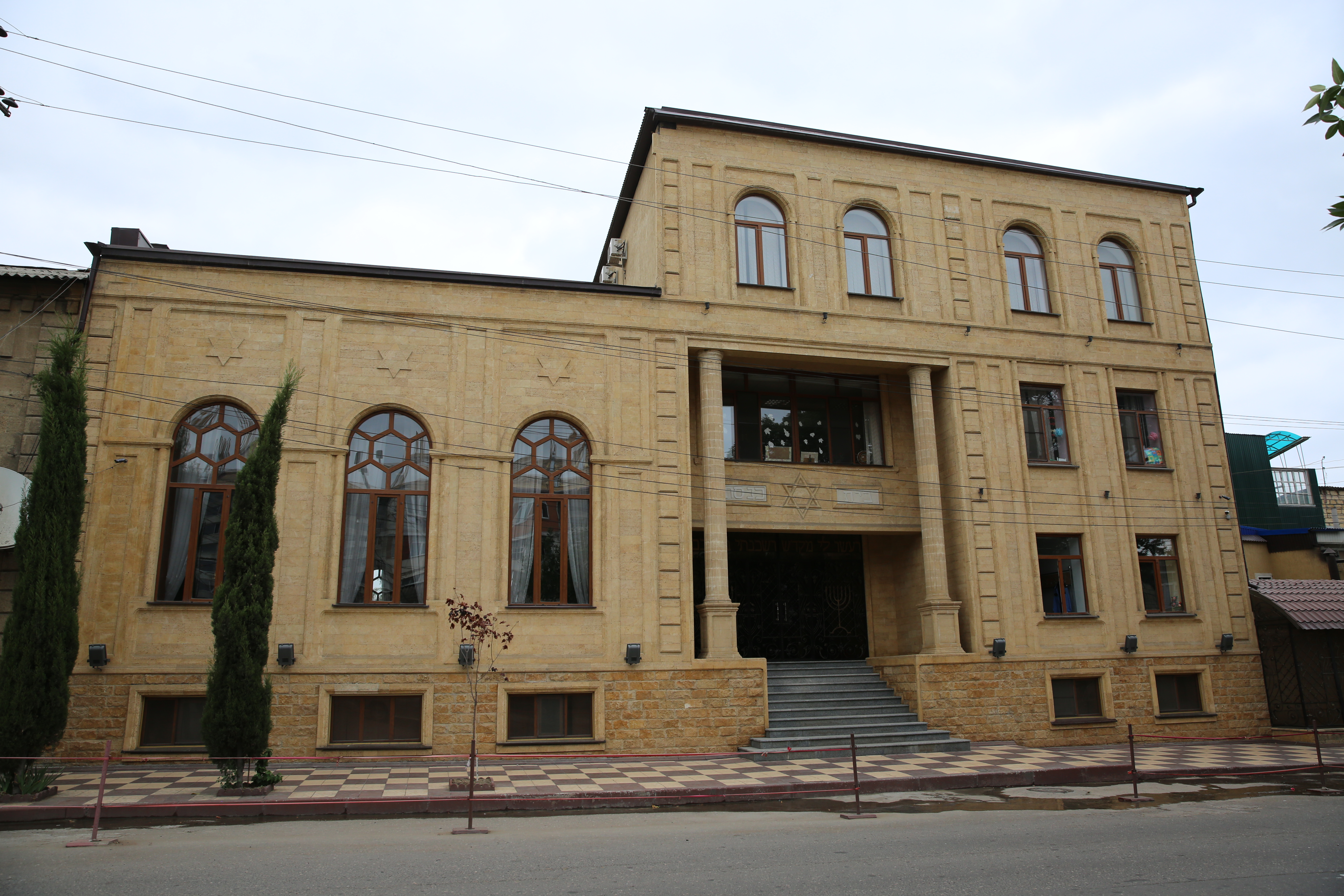
- The synagogue in 2015, prior to its destruction

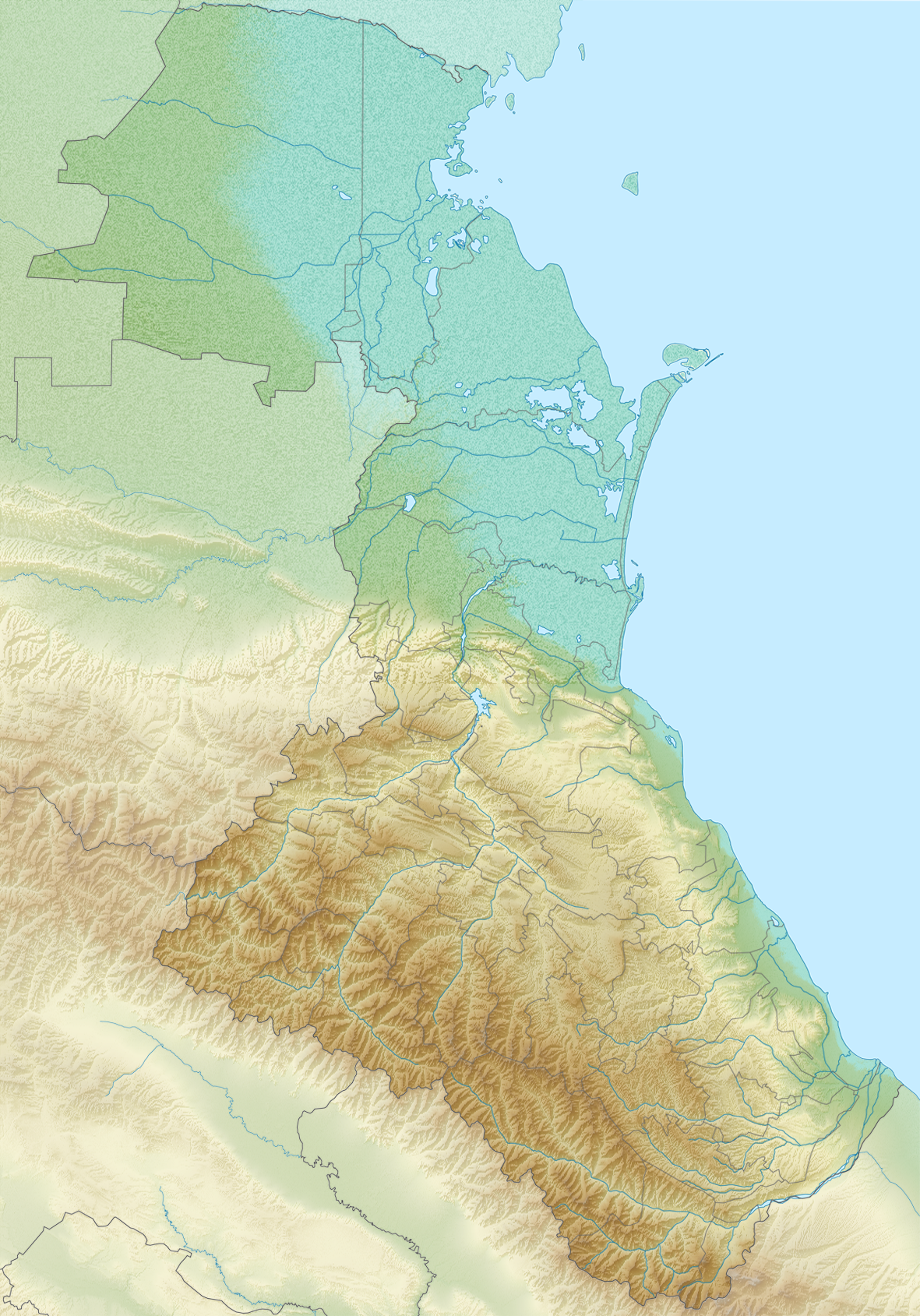
- Location of the destroyed synagogue in Dagestan

Religion
- Affiliation: Orthodox Judaism (former)
- Ecclesiastical or organisational status: Synagogue
- Status: Destroyed

Location
- Location: 94 Tagi-Zade Street, Derbent, Dagestan, North Caucasus
- Country: Russia
- Coordinates: 42°03′25″N 48°17′29″E

Architecture
- Type: Synagogue architecture
- Funded by: the Khanukaev family
- Groundbreaking: 1913
- Completed: 1914; rebuilt 2010
- Materials: Limestone blocks

Website
- kelenumaz.ru

The Derbent Synagogue, also known as Kele-Numaz (Russian: Дербентская синагога "Келе-Нумаз", romanized: Derbentskaya sinagoga "Kele-Numaz"; Hebrew: בית הכנסת דרבנט "קל-נומז", romanized: Beit haKnesset Derbent "Kel-Numaz") was a former Orthodox Jewish congregation and synagogue, located at 94 Tagi-Zade Street, in the city of Derbent in the Republic of Dagestan, in the North Caucasus of Russia.

The only synagogue in Derbent, was destroyed in a terrorist attack on 23 June 2024. In 1997, prior to its destruction, the synagogue was listed on the Russian cultural heritage register as a monument of regional significance.

== History ==
In 19th century Derbent the upper, oldest part of the city, closer to the citadel of Naryn-Kala, was primarily inhabited by Muslims, the central, flat part by Mountain Jews, and the lower part, near the sea by Armenians and Russians.

The Kele-Numaz synagogue was opened in 1914 and is under the supervision of the Federation of Jewish Communities of Russia (FJCR).

At the beginning of the Soviet era there were 11 synagogues in the city, including the Kele-Numaz.

In February 1904 the Mountain Jewish community petitioned the city authorities to allocate land for the construction of a new synagogue. The petition said that during the time of the Derbent Khanate, the Jews built a synagogue on the 2nd Komendantskaya Street (the Midrash Eliyahu synagogue), but the number of congregants had increased beyond the synagogue's capacity.

The city authorities allocated 300 m^{2} (3,200 sq ft) to the Mountain Jewish community for the construction of a prayer house at the corner of Golitsyn Street (now Buynaksk Street) and Kolodezny Lane (now Chapayev Lane).

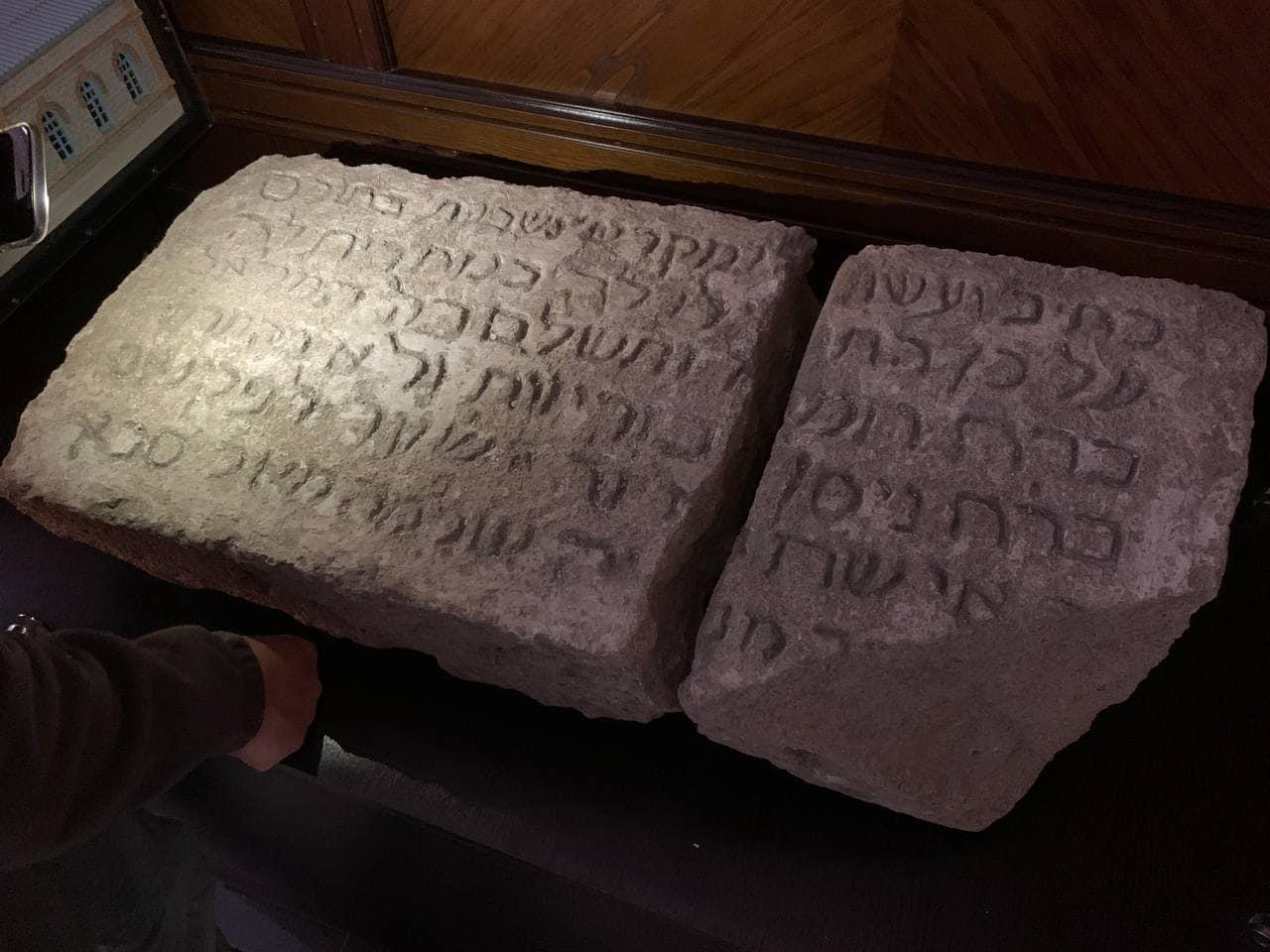
Inscription on the foundation stone of the Kele-Numaz Synagogue in Derbent, placed during the building’s construction in 1810.

=== Restoration ===
In 2009 the synagogue was dismantled and reconstructed using old stones and new materials. The rebuilt building is called the Jewish Community Center. Above the main entrance of the Jewish community center a sign in Hebrew says, "And let them make me a sanctuary, that I may dwell in their midst." The total area of the Jewish Community Center is 2,500 m^{2} (27,000 sq ft). There is a mikveh, the Municipal Kindergarten and the Museum of Mountain Jews. The President of Dagestan, Magomedsalam Magomedov, and rabbi Berel Lazar attended the reopening of the synagogue on March 22, 2010.

=== 2024 terrorist attack ===
On 23 June 2024, the synagogue was attacked and burned to the ground in a terrorist attack. Days after the attack, it was reported that the congregation plans to rebuild the synagogue.

== See also ==
- History of the Jews in Derbent
- History of the Jews in Russia
- List of synagogues in Russia
