= Tpig =

Tpig Тпиг
- Selo

Other transcription(s)
  - Aghul: Типпигъ
- Interactive map of Tpig
- Location of Tpig Tpig (Republic of Dagestan)
- Coordinates: 41°46′52″N 47°35′29″E
- Country: Russia
- Federal subject: Dagestan
- Administrative district: Agulsky District
- Elevation: 2,074 m (6,804 ft)

Population (2010 Census)
  - Total: 2,730
  - Estimate (2025): 2,803 (+2.7%)

Administrative status
  - Capital of: Agulsky District

Municipal status
  - Municipal district: Agulsky Municipal District
  - Rural settlement: Selo Tpig Rural Settlement
  - Capital of: Agulsky Municipal District, Selo Tpig Rural Settlement
- Time zone: UTC+3 (MSK)
- Postal code: 368380
- OKTMO ID: 82601435101

Tpig (Russian: Тпиг; Aghul: Типпигъ) is a rural locality (a selo) and the administrative center of Agulsky District of the Republic of Dagestan, Russia. Population: 2,730 (2010 census); 2,637 (2002 census); 1,689 (1989 Soviet census).

The village was part of the Kyurinski county.
