= Agulsky District =

Agulsky District Агульский район (Russian)
- District

Other transcription(s)
  - Aghul: Агъул район
  - Dargwa: Агъулла къатI
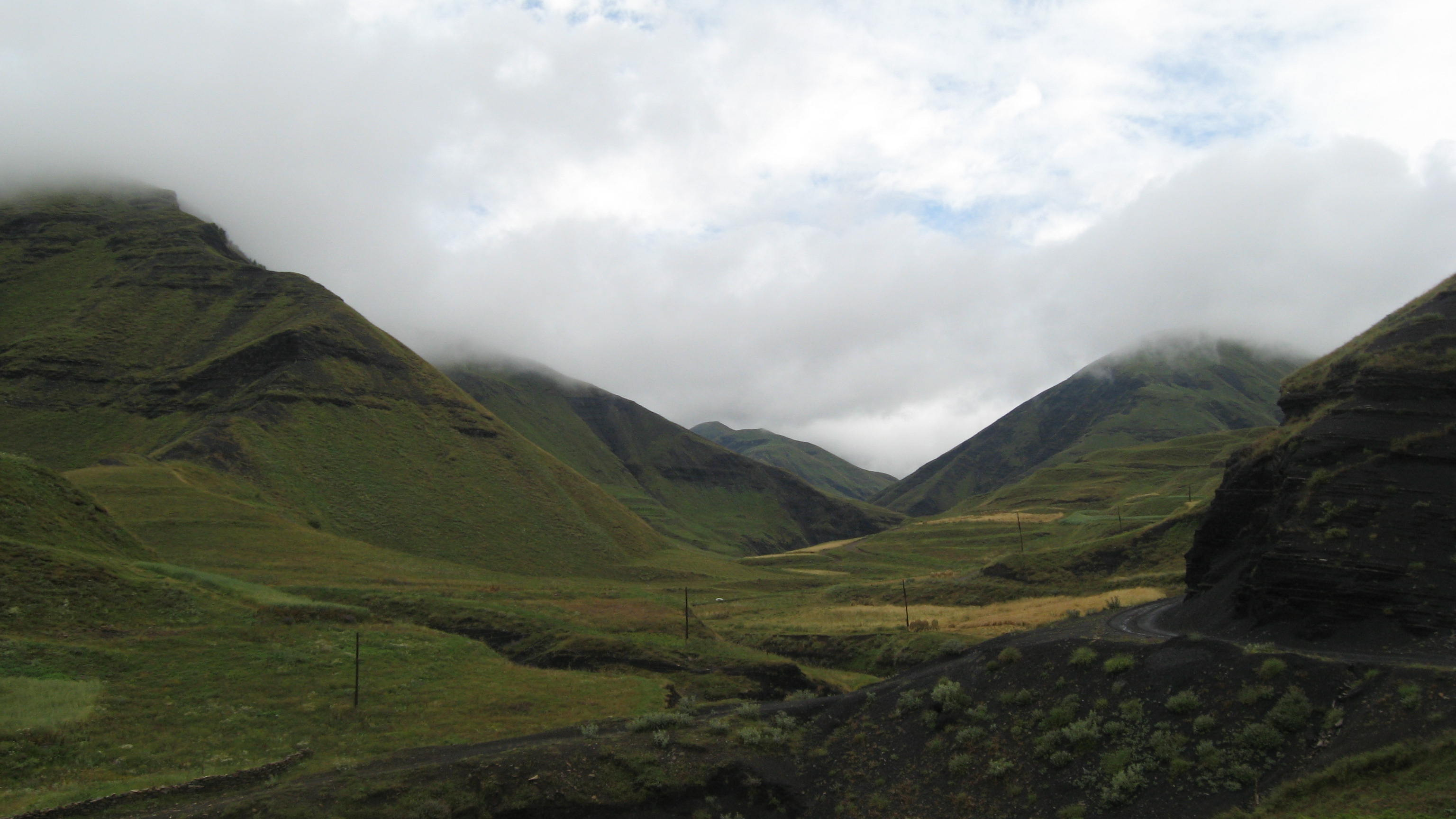
- Mountains in Agulsky District

- Flag
- Location of Agulsky District in the Republic of Dagestan
- Coordinates: 41°47′N 47°36′E
- Country: Russia
- Federal subject: Republic of Dagestan
- Established: 1934
- Administrative center: Tpig

Area
  - Total: 793.5 km^{2} (306.4 sq mi)

Population (2010 Census)
  - Total: 11,204
  - Density: 14.12/km^{2} (36.57/sq mi)
  - Urban: 0%
  - Rural: 100%

Administrative structure
  - Administrative divisions: 6 Selsoviets
  - Inhabited localities: 19 rural localities

Municipal structure
  - Municipally incorporated as: Agulsky Municipal District
  - Municipal divisions: 0 urban settlements, 10 rural settlements
- Time zone: UTC+3 (MSK)
- OKTMO ID: 82601000
- Website: http://www.mo-agul.ru

Population of Agulsky District
- 2010 Census: 11,204
- 2002 Census: 11,290
- 1989 Census: 7,315
- 1979 Census: 9,721

Agulsky District (Russian: Агу́льский райо́н) is an administrative and municipal district (raion), one of the forty-one in the Republic of Dagestan, Russia. It is located in the south of the republic. The area of the district is 793.5 square kilometers (306.4 sq mi). Its administrative center is the rural locality (a selo) of Tpig. As of the 2010 Census, the total population of the district was 11,204, with the population of Tpig accounting for 24.4% of that number.

== Administrative and municipal status ==
Within the framework of administrative divisions, Agulsky District is one of the forty-one in the Republic of Dagestan. The district is divided into six selsoviets which comprise nineteen rural localities. As a municipal division, the district is incorporated as Agulsky Municipal District. Its six selsoviets are incorporated as ten rural settlements within the municipal district. The selo of Tpig serves as the administrative center of both the administrative and municipal district.
