= Qaraxanlı =

Qaraxanlı or Qaraxanli or Karakhanly may refer to:

- Qaraxanlı, Aghjabadi, Azerbaijan
- Qaraxanlı, Tovuz, Azerbaijan
