= God Nisanov =

Azerbaijani billionaire businessman

- Qod Nisanov
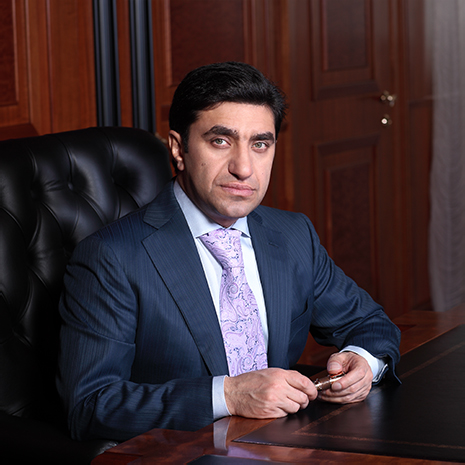
- Nisanov in 2016
- Born: 24 April 1972 (age 54); Gyrmyzy Gasaba, Quba District, Azerbaijan SSR, Soviet Union
- Citizenship: Russian Federation; Commonwealth of Dominica
- Education: College of Finance and Credit; Baku Institute of Law
- Occupation: Property development
- Spouse: Married
- Children: 4
- Awards

God Semenovich Nisanov (Azerbaijani: Qod Semyonoviç Nisanov, IPA: [ɡot semˈjonovitʃ niˈsɑnof]; born 24 April 1972) is a Russian-Azerbaijani billionaire property developer and co-owner of the Kievskaya Ploshchad. In 2023, Forbes ranked Nisanov as the 1027th wealthiest person globally, with a net worth of $2.9 billion, placing him 43rd in the Russian ranking.

In 2014, God Nisanov was elected vice president of the World Jewish Congress. However, he lost his position in the summer of 2022 after the U.S. placed him on the sanctions list. As of March 2024, God Nisanov is also a member of the Bureau of the Presidium of the Russian Jewish Congress.

In 1992, God Nisanov and his compatriot Zarakh Iliev founded the Kievskaya Ploshchad Group of Companies. As of 2024, Kievskaya Ploshchad owns commercial, office, warehouse, and hotel real estate in Moscow, and Flotilla Radisson Royal on the Moskva River. Among its largest assets are the Sadovod market, the agricultural cluster Food City, Hotel Ukraina, the food court Depo, and the Olympic Stadium. According to Forbes and RBK, Kievskaya Ploshchad ranks among Russia's 100 largest private companies. It is also the most significant player in the Russian commercial property market.

God Nisanov is known for his close connections with the Russian and Azerbaijani political elite. Ilham Rahimov, a former fellow student of Vladimir Putin, holds shares in many of Kievskaya Ploshchad's projects. Following the full-scale invasion of Ukraine, the United States, the United Kingdom, Ukraine, Canada, Japan, Australia, and New Zealand placed Nisanov on the sanction lists.

== Early life and education ==
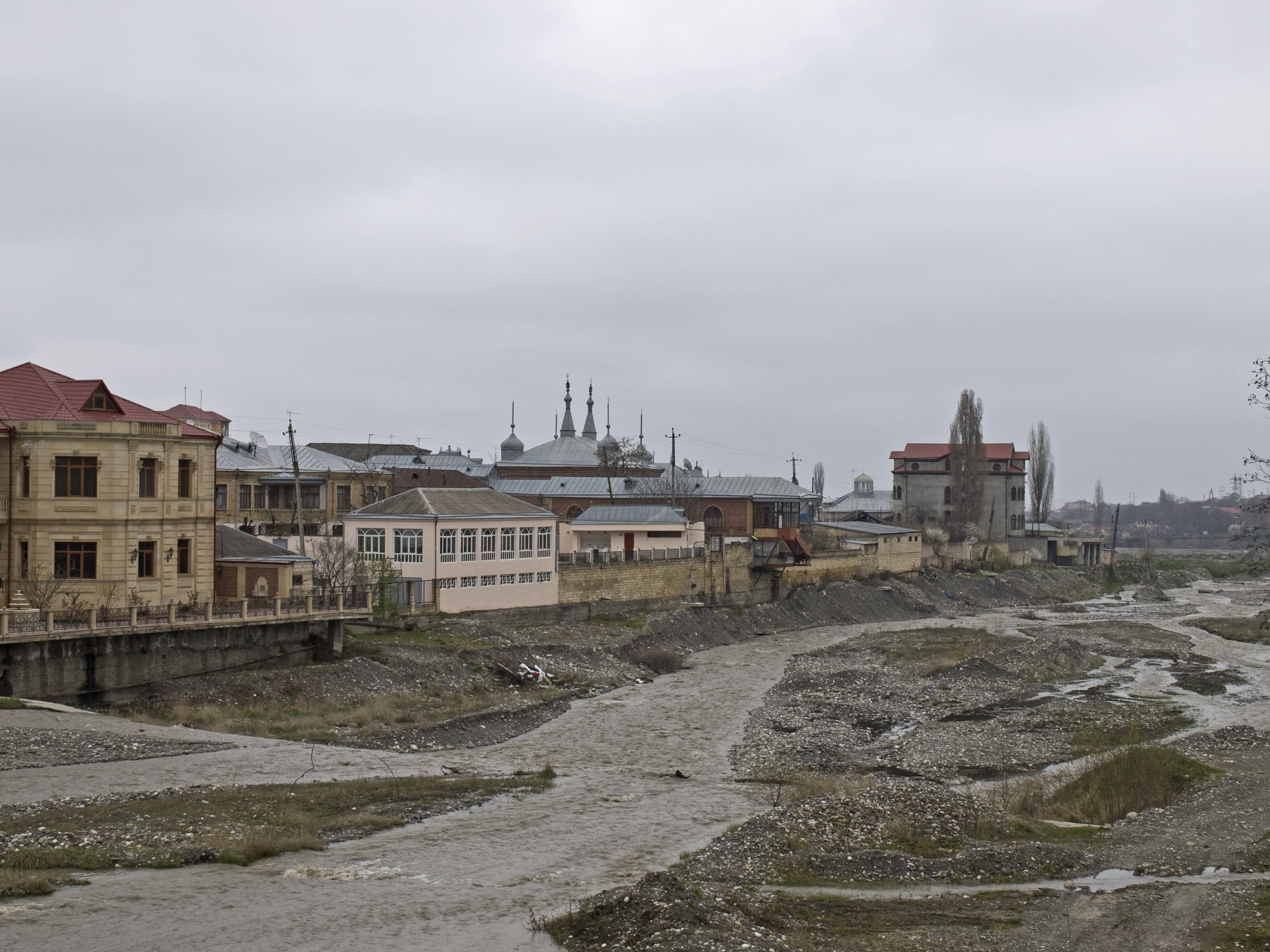
Krasnaya Sloboda in 2016

God Nisanov was born on 24 April 1972 in Gyrmyzy Gasaba (Krasnaya Sloboda), Azerbaijan SSR. His family hails from the Mountain Jewish community. His father, Semyon Nisanov, was the director of Shahdag, the largest cannery in the Quba district. In addition to God, his parents had three other children.

After school, God Nisanov pursued his education at the Baku Finance and Credit College, specializing in "lending and jurisprudence in the social security system." Afterward, Nisanov served in the social security service while holding a part-time position at his father's cannery. Later, Nisanov also opened a small consignment shop in his native village Krasnaya Sloboda.

In the early 1990s, Nisanov moved to Moscow. In 1992, along with his compatriot Zarakh Iliev, he founded the Kievskaya Ploshchad Group. Nisanov's father, Semyon Nisanov, also became one of the founders. Initially focused on real estate development, the company later expanded its portfolio to include the hotel and restaurant business.

== Kievskaya Ploshchad ==
Among Kievskaya Ploshchad's first projects were the shopping centers Elektronny Ray, Panorama, Grand, and the auto center Moskva. In 2005, the company made a significant acquisition by obtaining one of the Stalinist skyscrapers known as the Hotel Ukraina, which was later renamed Radisson Collection after undergoing reconstruction.

2009 marked the closure of the Cherkizovsky Market, where Iliev and Nisanov were junior partners of Telman Ismailov. However, their business only flourished since they began actively developing their project — the largest goods market in Moscow, Sadovod, which Nisanov and Iliev have owned since 2003. In 2009 also, Kievskaya Ploshchad opened the 8-story shopping and entertainment center Evropeyskiy, located near with the Moscow Kiyevsky railway station. Additionally, Nisanov and Iliev launched the Radisson Royal flotilla on the Moskva River.

In 2014, the agrocluster Food City, covering more than 120 hectares, was opened. In 2015, the Moskvarium, an Oceanography and Marine Biology Center, was opened at the Exhibition of Achievements of National Economy, becoming the largest educational center with an aquarium in Europe.

In 2017, the company purchased the Olympic Stadium from the Alliance Group.

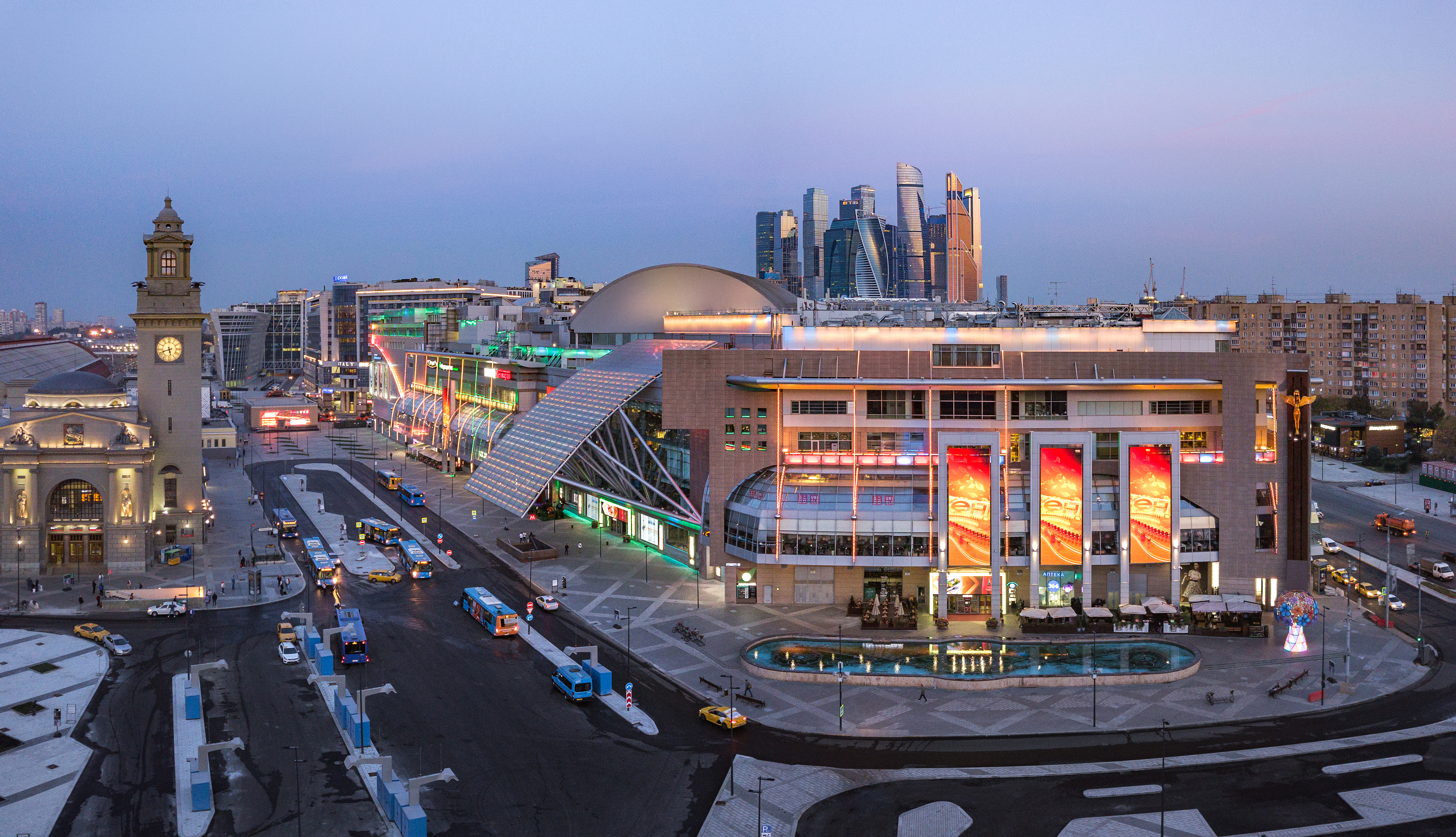
Evropeyskiy shopping and entertainment center

In the spring of 2019, Kievskaya Ploshchad opened the food court Depo near the Belorusskaya metro station.

In September 2021, Kievskaya Ploshchad acquired a 9.8% stake in Samolet, one of the largest mass housing developers in Russia. In 2023, Samolet announced it would develop 28.4 hectares of residential and commercial real estate in the Vostochnoe Biryulevo area. That land previously belonged to the Emeral market, also owned by Kievskaya Ploshchad.

Kievskaya Ploshchad is among the top hundred in Forbes' ranking of the "200 largest private companies in Russia," ranking 65th in the latest 2021 list. It reported a revenue of 160 billion rubles (more than $2 billion). In 2024, Kievskaya Ploshchad claimed the top position in the Forbes ranking of "Kings of Russian Real Estate," with a reported rental income of $1.7 billion.

The Sadovod market and the agrocluster Food City are widely known for their large-scale illegal cash turnover. Sadovod has long been the most significant center in Moscow for cryptocurrency transactions. The stability of Kievskaya Ploshchad's business is manifested through a complex ownership scheme. While a significant portion of the business is not registered to Nisanov himself, it belongs to his numerous relatives, friends, and associates. What also contributes to the success of Kievskaya Ploshchad is Nisanov and Iliev's close ties with high-ranking Russian officials, including Sergey Naryshkin, the director of the Foreign Intelligence Service, Dmitry Rogozin, the former head of Roscosmos, and Sergey Sobyanin, the Mayor of Moscow. Iliev and Nisanov's key partner is Ilham Rahimov, who is also Vladimir Putin's former classmate.

== Fortune ==
For many years, God Nisanov has consistently ranked among the wealthiest individuals in Russia. According to Forbes, in 2015 his fortune peaked at an estimated $4.3 billion. By 2023, he was ranked 1027th among the wealthiest individuals worldwide and 43rd in Russia, with a net worth of $2.9 billion. As of early March 2024, global Forbes valued his fortune at $3.3 billion.

== Sanctions ==
On 2 June 2022, following the Russian invasion of Ukraine, Nisanov was added to the U.S. sanctions list. Secretary of State Antony Blinken called him "one of the wealthiest people in Europe" and an "associate of high-ranking Russian officials."

On 26 September 2022, Nisanov was added to the U.K. sanctions list, as "Putin continues to rely on a clique of oligarchs and selected elite representatives to finance his war."

On 19 October 2022, Ukraine included Nisanov in its sanctions list, as the businessman "provides a significant source of income for the Russian government, which initiated military actions and the genocide of the civilian population in Ukraine.

On 24 February 2023, on the anniversary of the beginning of the invasion of Ukraine, Nisanov was included in Canada's sanctions list of "elites and close associates of the regime."

For similar reasons, Nisanov has been under sanctions by Japan since 5 June 2022, Australia (since 1 June 2022) and New Zealand (since 12 October 2022).

=== Consequences ===
The U.S. sanctions affected Kievskaya Ploshchad and all the affiliated organizations in which the parent structure, Nisanov, or Iliev directly or indirectly own a stake of 50% or more.

In June 2022, Nisanov decided to step down as chairman of the Board of Directors of the JSC Olympic Sports Complex (Olympic Stadium) and to relinquish all management responsibilities within the project. He was also forced to resign from his position as a vice president of the World Jewish Congress.

== Scandals ==
Media reports highlight the close ties existing between Nisanov and Sergey Naryshkin, the director of the Foreign Intelligence Service of the Russian Federation. According to an investigation conducted by the media outlet Proekt, following the onset of the COVID-19 pandemic, Naryshkin regularly used Nisanov's private swimming pool at the Evropeyskiy center. Furthermore, their connection is implicated in controversial real estate transactions. For example, in 2011, Naryshkin's daughter, Veronika, acquired ownership of a 180-square-meter luxury apartment valued at over 100 million rubles. Veronika was only 23 years old at the time of the purchase, while the previous apartment owner was affiliated with God Nisanov. Additionally, Naryshkin and his daughter regularly used Nisanov's private business jet. Veronika Naryshkina flew to Baku using Nisanov's Gulfstream G650, and the entire Naryshkin family made multiple trips to Austria for skiing. Shortly thereafter, the Russian government blacklisted Proekt.media.

In 2019, entrepreneur Ilgar Gadzhiev alleged that God Nisanov compelled him to exit their joint construction holding, SDI Group. Gadzhiev claimed that Nisanov utilized law enforcement agencies and the private security company "Vityaz," controlled by Kievskaya Ploshchad, to achieve this. The Russian and Azerbaijani authorities initiated criminal cases against Gadzhiev. Additionally, Azerbaijan attempted to have him declared wanted through Interpol. Gadzhiev first fled to Europe and then to the United States. In January 2023, the U.S. Department of Justice recognized Ilgar Gadzhiev as a possible victim of a crime. This proposed legal protection may be linked to a possible attempted murder of Gadzhiev, orchestrated by God Nisanov.

== Philanthropy and public activities ==
In 2014, God Nisanov was elected vice president of the World Jewish Congress. However, he lost his position in the summer of 2022 when he was added to the U.S. sanctions list. He is also a member of the Bureau of the Presidium of the Russian Jewish Congress. In 2015, together with Zarakh Iliev, Nisanov opened the Jewish school Cheder Menahem in Moscow. Moreover, in 2019, they initiated the opening of the Community Center for the Association of Mountain Jews of Moscow. Nisanov and Iliev also assist their native village of Krasnaya Sloboda. In 2020, they contributed to the opening of the world's first Museum of Mountain Jews in the village.

Nisanov donated to several charity organizations, including Liniya Zhizni (Russian: Линия Жизни), Podari Zhizn (Russian: Подари Жизнь), Bumagniy Guravlik (Russian: Бумажный Журавлик), Kray Dobra (Russian: Край Добра), and others. Together with Iliev, Nisanov provided financial assistance to the NGO Natsionalnaya Meditsynskaya Palata and the Dynamo Sports Club. In 2013, Nisanov sponsored the restoration of the Kronstadt Naval Cathedral. He also funded the construction of a sports complex for students of the Saint Petersburg State Marine Technical University. Later, Nisanov donated 100 million rubles for the creation of the Rzhev Memorial to the Soviet Soldier. He was also one of the sponsors of the Sergei Ursuliak's movie Pravednik.

== Personal life ==
God Nisanov is married and has four children: sons Saul, Mair, and Alexander, and a daughter, Margarita. He lives in Moscow.

The businessman actively engages in sports. He is particularly passionate about underwater diving and horse riding. In addition, Nisanov speaks six languages, including Turkish, Persian, and Arabic.

It is known that Nisanov's relatives are also actively involved in business. For example, God Nisanov's nephew, Ervin Nisanov, has invested in the development of the Pims tea cafes in Moscow. In December 2023, God Nisanov's father, Semyon Nisanov, died in a mansion on the Sparrow Hills.

=== Citizenships ===
In 2007, God Nisanov ran for a seat in the 5th State Duma from the Liberal Democratic Party of Russia. However, the Central Election Commission filed a lawsuit against Nisanov because his Russian citizenship was invalid. The Supreme Court of Russia satisfied the lawsuit.

In July 2022, Nisanov applied for Portuguese citizenship based on being a descendant of Sephardic Jews. However, given the extensive media attention, the Portuguese Ministry of Justice soon stated that it would "scrutinize" Nisanov's citizenship application.

The joint investigation by Proekt and the Organized Crime and Corruption Reporting Project revealed that in 2017, Nisanov purchased a "golden passport" from the Commonwealth of Dominica to circumvent international sanctions. All of Nisanov's children also obtained Dominican passports. God Nisanov's brother Ilyagu, as well as his sons Ervin and Leon, obtained Caribbean passports.

== Awards ==
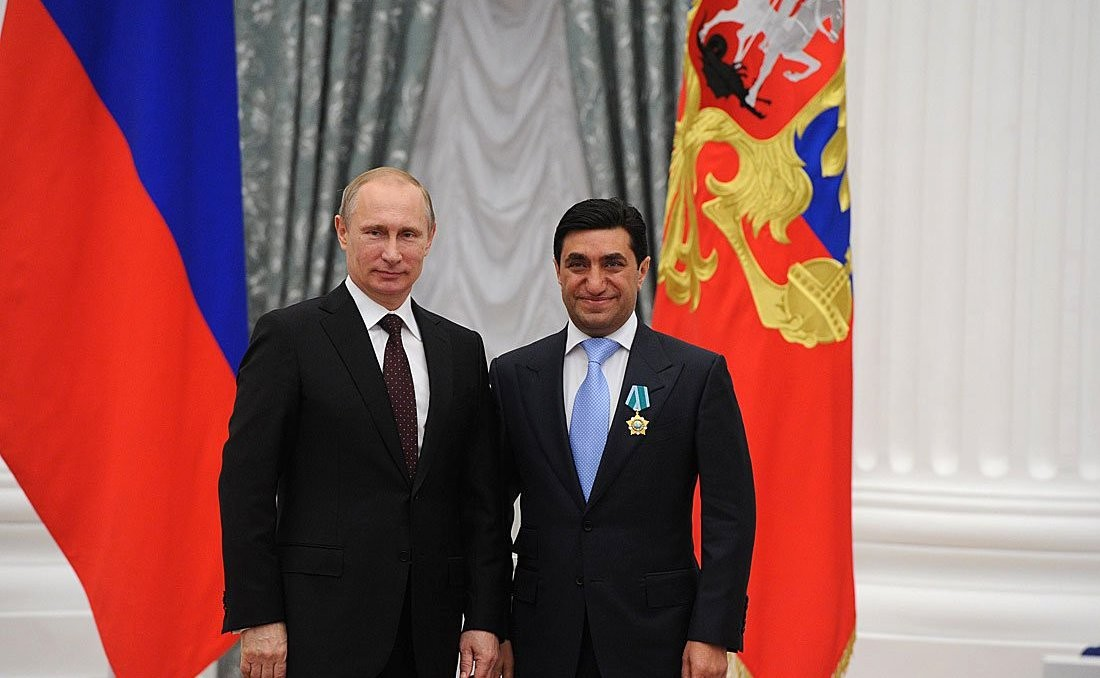
God Nisanov received the Order of Friendship in 2014

- Taraggi Medal (4 July 2011, Azerbaijan) — for contributions to strengthening friendship between peoples and the development of the Azerbaijani diaspora.
- Russian Federation Presidential Certificate of Honour (18 April 2012) — for a significant contribution to the implementation of measures for the restoration of the Kronstadt Naval Cathedral in the name of Saint Nicholas the Wonderworker.
- Order of Friendship (14 January 2014) — for labor achievements and many years of fruitful work.
- The Award for Leadership (2014).
- Federation of Jewish Communities of Russia's' Skripach na kryshe Award (2015).
- Commemorative Medal "70 Years of Victory in the Great Patriotic War 1941–1945" (2015) — for active participation in the patriotic education of citizens and addressing the socio-economic problems of veterans of the Great Patriotic War.
- For Service to the Fatherland Order (3rd degree) (1 June 2016, Azerbaijan) — for contributions to strengthening friendship between peoples and the development of the Azerbaijani diaspora.
- Decoration "For Beneficence" (12 February 2021) — for contributing to the implementation of the project to create the Rzhev Memorial to the Soviet Soldier.
- Elected Person of the Decade by the Mountain Jewish Community — for significant contributions to the development of the communal life of Mountain Jews in all countries and cities around the world.
- Dostlug Order (21 April 2022, Azerbaijan) — for contributions to strengthening friendship between peoples and the development of the Azerbaijani diaspora.
