= Zarakh Iliev =

Azerbaijani billionaire businessman

Zarakh Binsionovich Iliev
- Зарах Бинсионович Илиев
- Born: 8 September 1966 (age 59); Gyrmyzy Gasaba, Quba District, Azerbaijan SSR, Soviet Union
- Citizenship: Russian Federation, Commonwealth of Dominica
- Occupation: Property developer
- Known for: Billionaire property developer
- Children: Two

Zarakh Iliev (Russian: Зарах Бинсионович Илиев, born 8 September 1966) is a Russian–Azerbaijani billionaire property developer and co-owner of the Kievskaya Ploshchad. As of early March 2024, Forbes estimated his fortune to be $3.3 billion. Iliev is one of the wealthiest people in Russia and ranks 1027th in the ranking of the wealthiest people on the planet.

In 1992 Zarakh Iliev and his compatriot God Nisanov founded the Kievskaya Ploshchad Group of Companies. As of 2024, Kievskaya Ploshchad owns commercial, office, warehouse, and hotel real estate in Moscow, and Flotilla Radisson Royal on the Moskva River. Among its largest assets are the Sadovod market, the agricultural cluster Food City, Hotel Ukraina, the food court Depo, and the Olympic Stadium. According to Forbes and RBK, Kievskaya Ploshchad ranks among Russia's 100 largest private companies. It is also the most significant player in the Russian commercial property market.

Zarakh Iliev is known for his close connections with the Russian and Azerbaijani political elite. Ilham Rahimov, a former fellow student of Vladimir Putin, holds shares in many of Kievskaya Ploshchad's projects.

Following the full-scale invasion of Ukraine, the USA, the UK, and Ukraine placed Iliev on the sanction lists.

== Early life ==
Zarakh Iliev was born on 8 September 1966 in the village of Krasnaya Sloboda in the Azerbaijan SSR. The place is also known as the "Caucasian Jerusalem" as it is the only settlement of Mountain Jews in the post-Soviet space. They even have a unique language, Judeo-Tat, that is distinct to their community. Iliev's father, Binsion Iliev, was a shoemaker, while the mother was a housewife. Besides Zarakh, the family also had five other children – three sons and two daughters. From childhood, Binsion Iliev had been teaching them the craft of shoemaking. In his youth years, Zarakh Iliev created a small business in his native village Krasnaya Sloboda, making headgear and selling it in the neighboring city of Quba.

== Career ==
At the age of 17 Iliev moved to Moscow. There, together with his compatriot God Nisanov, he started wholesaling at the Cherkizovsky Market. In 1992 Iliev and Nisanov founded the Kievskaya Ploshchad Group of Companies, which focused on property development. Iliev's friendship with the market owner Telman Ismailov only facilitated the business.

Among Kievskaya Ploshchad's first projects were the shopping centers Elektronny Ray, Panorama, Grand, as well as the auto center Moskva. In 2005, the company made a significant acquisition by obtaining one of the Stalinist skyscrapers known as the Hotel Ukraina, which was later renamed Radisson Collection after undergoing reconstruction.

2009 marked the closure of the Cherkizovsky Market, where Iliev and Nisanov were junior partners of Telman Ismailov. However, their business only flourished since they began actively developing their project — the largest goods market in Moscow, Sadovod, which Iliev and Nisanov have owned since 2003. In the same year of 2009, Kievskaya Ploshchad opened the 8-story shopping and entertainment center Evropeyskiy, located near with the Moscow Kiyevsky railway station. Additionally, Iliev and Nisanov launched the Radisson Royal flotilla on the Moskva River.

In 2014 the agrocluster Food City, covering more than 120 hectares, was opened. In 2015, the Moskvarium, an Oceanography and Marine Biology Center, was opened at the Exhibition of Achievements of National Economy, becoming the largest educational center with an aquarium in Europe.

In 2017 the company purchased the Olympic Stadium from the Alliance Group.

In the spring of 2019 Kievskaya Ploshchad opened the food court Depo near the Belorusskaya metro station.

In September 2021 Kievskaya Ploshchad acquired a 9.8% stake in Samolet, one of the largest mass housing developers in Russia. In 2023, Samolet announced it would develop 28.4 hectares of residential and commercial real estate in the Vostochnoe Biryulevo area. That land previously belonged to the Emeral market, also owned by Kievskaya Ploshchad.

Kievskaya Ploshchad is among the top hundred in Forbes' ranking of the "200 largest private companies in Russia," ranking 65th in the latest 2021 list. It reported a revenue of 160 billion rubles (more than $2 billion). In 2024, Kievskaya Ploshchad claimed the top position in the Forbes ranking of "Kings of Russian Real Estate," with a reported rental income of $1.7 billion.

The Sadovod market and the agrocluster Food City are widely known for their large-scale illegal cash turnover. Sadovod has long been the most significant center in Moscow for cryptocurrency transactions. The stability of Kievskaya Ploshchad's business is manifested through close ties with high-ranking Russian officials, including Sergey Naryshkin, the director of the Foreign Intelligence Service, Dmitry Rogozin, the former head of Roscosmos, and Sergey Sobyanin, the Mayor of Moscow. Iliev and Nisanov's key partner is Ilham Rahimov, who is also Vladimir Putin's former classmate.

== Wealth ==
Zarakh Iliev has been one of the wealthiest people in Russia for two decades, ranking 71st in the list of the richest people in 2005 with an estimated fortune of $400 million. In the 2023 ranking, he held the 43rd position with a fortune of $2.7 billion. As of March 2024, global Forbes estimated his fortune to be $3.3 billion.

== Sanctions ==
On 26 September 2022, following Russia's invasion of Ukraine, Iliev was added to the UK's sanction lists. This action was taken in response to the Russian regime's conduct of 'fake referendums,' indicating Iliev's support or benefit from the Russian government. It was noted that "Putin continues to rely on a clique of oligarchs and selected representatives of the elite to finance his war."

On 19 October 2022 Iliev was included in Ukraine's sanctions list on the ground of "providing a significant source of income for the government of Russia, which initiated military actions and genocide against the civilian population in Ukraine." On 12 December 2023, he was included in the US sanctions list. Iliev was seen as "providing a significant source of income for the government of Russia, which initiated military actions and genocide against the civilian population in Ukraine." The U.S. sanctions affected Kievskaya Ploshchad and all the affiliated organizations in which the parent structure, Iliev, or Nisanov, directly or indirectly own a stake of 50% or more.

== Philanthropy and public activities ==
Iliev donated to several charity organizations, including Liniya Zhizni (Russian: Линия Жизни), Podari Zhizn (Russian: Подари Жизнь), Bumagniy Guravlik (Russian: Бумажный Журавлик), Kray Dobra (Russian: Край Добра), and Oxana Fedorova's charity foundation. Iliev's donations have funded the renovation of the interior of the temple at the artistic and production enterprise Sofrino. He has also made charitable contributions to the Dynamo Sports Club, renovated the cafeteria at Moscow State University, and facilities at the Petrovskaya Academy of Sciences and Arts. Together with Nisanov, they funded the construction of a sports complex for students of the Saint Petersburg State Marine Technical University.

Zarakh Iliev is a prominent figure in the Russian Jewish community and the mountain Jewish diaspora in Moscow. In 2014, together with God Nisanov, they invested in the construction of the Jewish school Cheder Menahem in Moscow. They also initiated the opening of the Community Center for the Association of Mountain Jews of Moscow in 2019. Iliev and Nisanov also provide assistance to their native village of Krasnaya Sloboda. In 2020, they contributed to the opening of the world's first Museum of Mountain Jews in the village.

== Recognition ==
In 2015 Iliev's contribution was recognized with the Skripach na Kryshe award by the Federation of Jewish Communities of Russia in the category of "Charity." Additionally, in the same year, Iliev was awarded the title of Honorary Builder of Russia.

== Personal life ==
Zarakh Iliev is married and has two sons: Ben-Zion and Vadim.

Iliev purchased "golden passports" from the Dominican Republic to bypass international sanctions for himself, his sons, and three other relatives. According to Al Jazeera, in 2018, Iliev could have obtained a "golden passport" from Cyprus as well.

Iliev is interested in painting and also enjoys fishing. Along with the Hotel Ukraina, Iliev and Nisanov acquired a collection of 1,200 socialist realism paintings. These paintings were part of the acquisition, and included the works by Aleksandr Deyneka, Aristarkh Lentulov, Dmitry Nalbandyan, Nikolai Romadin, Mikhail Suzdaltsev, the collective of Kukryniksy, and other artists. These paintings were restored with the entrepreneurs' personal funds. Iliev's personal office is also located at the Hotel Ukraina.

Iliev also holds several patents for inventions, including a patent for the rotating logo of the shopping and entertainment center Evropeyskiy.
