= Sergei Roldugin =

Russian oligarch (born 1951)

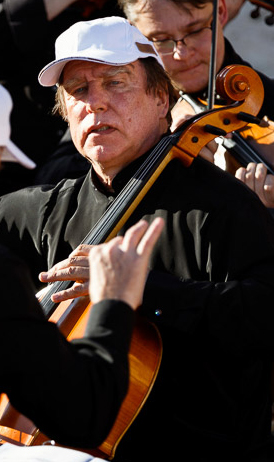
- Roldugin in Palmyra, May 2016
- Born: Sergei Pavlovich Roldugin; 28 September 1951 (age 74); Sakhalin, Russian SFSR, Soviet Union
- Occupations: Cellist and businessman
- Known for: Panama Papers
- Spouses: Irina Nikitina; Elena Mirtova

Sergei Pavlovich Roldugin (Russian: Сергей Павлович Ролдугин, born 28 September 1951 Sakhalin) is a Russian cellist and businessman based in St Petersburg. He is a close friend of Vladimir Putin. He has been implicated in several money laundering and offshore wealth schemes for Russian elites. Following the Russian invasion of Ukraine in 2022, the European Union sanctioned Roldugin.

== Early life ==
Roldugin was born in Sakhalin where his father, a military man, was stationed. While he was young, his parents moved to Riga, Latvia, where he studied and became fluent in Latvian at Latvian School. He has relatives in Riga where his parents are buried.

During his mandatory enlistment with the Soviet Army at a base in Leningrad, he went AWOL from the base and met Vladimir Putin using the phone number that his older brother the KGB agent Evgeny Roldugin, who had attended KGB school with Putin, gave to Sergei.

== Career ==
He was awarded the 1980 Prague Spring International Music Festival Competition's 3rd prize. In 1984 Roldugin was appointed the Kirov Opera Theatre Orchestra's principal cellist. He subsequently held a professorship at the Saint Petersburg Conservatory, where he was the rector from 2002 to 2005. The Mariinsky Theatre Orchestra's guest conductor, he has been named a People's Artist of Russia.

Since the 1990s, Roldugin has been engaged in the oil and media business. He is known for having initiated the renovation of the decayed Alexis Palace as a music school and for having performed at the ruins of Palmyra a month after the site was reconquered from the ISIL. Roldugin plays the Stuart cello made by Antonio Stradivari in 1732; the instrument cost him $12 million.

== Relationship with Vladimir Putin ==
Sergei Roldugin is a godfather to Maria Vorontsova (b. 1985), Vladimir Putin's older daughter. Roldugin introduced both of Putin's daughters, Katya and Masha, to playing the piano and the violin. He has been friends with Putin since the late 1970s. In March 2016 The Guardian described Roldugin as "Putin's best friend". It was Roldugin who introduced Putin to Lyudmila, his future wife.

In connection with the Panama Papers, the Organized Crime and Corruption Reporting Project described Roldugin as the "secret caretaker" of Putin's hidden wealth through his participation in transactions with Mossack Fonseca and Dietrich, Baumgartner & Partner, who are Swiss lawyers in Zurich, to various offshore companies including Panama registered International Media Overseas, British Virgin Islands (BVI) registered Sonnette Overseas, Sunbarn Ltd and Sandalwood Continental, and the BVI registered Ove Financial Corp.

== Wealth ==
In September 1992, Nikolai Egorov, who is closely associated with Ilham Rahimov and the Antipinsky Refinery, co-founded the company CJSC JV "Petrointeroil" (Russian: АОЗТ/ЗАО СП "Петроинтеройл") together with Sergey Roldugin, Nikolay Khrameshkin, Vladimir Dmitrievich Yakovlev, Andrey Bulutanov and the other co-founders: the Swedish company Arne Larsson & Partners, Kronstadt Terminal JSC, Tyumenpetroleum JSC, the Baltika Trading House, and St. Petersburg Intertrade LLP (SPb Intertrade) (Russian: ТОО "Санкт-Петербург Интертрейд" ("СПб Интертрейд")), which Egorov founded in January 1992 placing Andrey Bulutanov as general director and gave Egorov a 17% stake with the controlling 50% stake held by the Vladimir Putin headed and Saint Petersburg based Mayor's Committee on Foreign Relations.

In 2008 under Sergey Skvortsov's leadership, Troika Dialog spearheaded the alliance of AvtoVAZ-Renault-Nissan and the partnership among KAMAZ OJSC, Daimler AG Concern and Rostec. In early April 2008, Rubin Vandaryan stated that Troika Dialog through Avtoinvest and Kamaz-Capital had the controlling stake in KamAZ. Since March 2008 through a deal with the Republic of Tatarstan, Troika Dialog was the nominal owner of AvtoVAZ and KamAZ for the beneficial owner Sergei Roldugin.

Roldugin has maintained close financial ties with the Cyprus-based RCB Bank which is a subsidiary of VTB Bank, Yuri Kovalchuk of Rossiya Bank, Oleg Gordin who owns Sandalwood Continental as the legal representative of Roldugin through Roldugin's sole ownership of International Media Overseas and is a St Petersburg businessman with Rossiya Bank, Aleksander Plekhov who owns Sunbarn Ltd as the legal representative of Roldugin through Roldugin's sole ownership of Sonnette Overseas and is a St Petersburg businessman with Rossiya Bank, Yevgeny Malov who is a partner of Gennady Timchenko and one of the founders of the oil trader Gunvor, the Rotenberg family (Arkady, Igor, and Boris), Suleyman Kerimov, Alexei Mordashov, and other Russian oligarchs.

Established by Mikhail Lesin in the early 1990s, Video International (VI) is one of Russia's largest television advertising firms which Roldugin has a large stake through the Cyprus-based Med Media Network which is solely owned by Roldugin's International Media Overseas. In 2003, Roman Abramovich, who is the beneficial owner of Sara Trust Settlement which, through its ownership of several shell companies, owned both Finoto Holdings and Grosora Holdings which were established in early 2003, gained a 25% stake in Video International through his beneficial ownership of two firms Finoto Holdings and Grosora holdings which each gained an 12.5% stake in Video International for only $130,000 for each stake and was well below the fair market value of each stake in Video International. On 10 September 2003, Yuri Zapol, who is a friend of Mikhail Lesin, owned a 41.5% stake in Video International and sold a 25% stake in Video International to Abramovich for only 8 million rubles. Vladimir Milov, who is an active opposition figure, has been declared a "foreign agent" by Russian authorities, and is a former deputy energy minister during President Putin’s first term, stated, "This package was clearly worth much more, by many orders of magnitude." In 2004, Abramovich received $1.8 million in dividends from his 25% stake in Video International. Later, in 2010, Abramovich sold his Video International stake of 12.5% held by Finoto Holdings for $20 million to Med Media Network, which is nominally owned by Sergei Roldugin, and sold his Video International stake of 12.5% held by Grosora Holdings for $20 million to Namiral Trading Ltd, which was later associated with Alexander Plekhov (Russian: Александр Плехов) who often acts in Rodulgin's interests. Plekhov's firms the Cyprus registered Namiral Trading Ltd and the British Virgin Islands registered Norma Group Ltd own a combined stake of 20% in Video International and have accounts with Gazprombank in Zurich, Switzerland, which often supports the interests of Rossiya Bank through the Swiss law firm Dietrich, Baumgartner & Partners which is located in Zurich as well.

In March 2019, Roldugin was implicated in a nearly $9 billion global money laundering scheme allegedly constructed by Sberbank CIB (formerly known as "Troika Dialog"), in which Roldugin received $69 million. The money laundering scheme is known as ŪkioLeaks or the Troika laundromat.

== 2016 United States elections hacking ==
According to Andrei Soldatov, the 3 April 2016 release of the Panama Papers, which is known in Russia as OffshoreGate (Russian: "Офшоргейта"), and, in particular, information about Roldugin's nearly $2 billion in assets, which are closely associated with Vladimir Putin's assets, directly led to a quid pro quo or a tit for tat with Putin ordering hacks of Hillary Clinton, her party and others to support Donald Trump's 2016 Presidential campaign and his party. (Note: In November 2014, Russians hacked into the United States Democratic Party's computer system, but United States authorities took no action. During April 2016, Vladimir Putin's close inner circle talked to persons close to Donald Trump. They had been talking to each other beginning in 2015.) (Note: The 3 April 2016 release date of the Offshoregate was just before Vladimir Putin's largest annual press conference, the All-Russian Popular Front (ONF) "Truth and Justice" in St. Petersburg (Russian: Медиа-форум Общероссийского народного фронта (ОНФ) «Правда и справедливость» в Санкт-Петербурге) which was held 4–7 April 2016. During this press conference, Vladimir Putin stated that Julian Assange's WikiLeaks told him that George Soros and his Open Society Foundations had provided funding for Offshoregate and, on behalf of the Kremlin, Dmitry Peskov stated that Offshoregate was intended to denigrate (Russian: "вброс") "Putin and Russia personally".) Dmitri Alperovitch, one of the founders of CrowdStrike, stated, "They ([hackers]) cast a wide net without knowing in advance what the benefit might be," and Andrei Soldatov said, "It was a series of tactical operations. At each moment, the people who were doing this [hacking] were filled with excitement over how well it was going, and that success pushed them to go even further."

== Sanctions ==
After Russia's 2022 invasion of Ukraine, the European Union and the United Kingdom sanctioned Roldugin in March.

Then in June 2022, the US sanctioned him pursuant to Executive Order 14024, and others like Severstal chairman Alexey Mordashov, Yury Slyusar, president of United Aircraft Corporation; Vitaly Savelyev, Russia’s transport minister; Maksim Reshetnikov, the country’s minister of economic development; Irek Faizullin, the minister of construction, housing, and utilities; Dmitry Grigorenko, the deputy prime minister and chief of the government staff; and Maria Zakharova, the spokesperson of the Russian Foreign Ministry.

Early in March 2023, four Gazprombank Switzerland employees in Zurich were put on trial for the help provided to Roldugin to evade money laundering laws, prior to 2016 and found guilty. The trial has significance. For the first time any allegations against Sergei Roldugin found legal ground and a court recognized that he did not act in his own interest.

== Personal life ==
Roldugin's first spouse was Irina Nikitina, President of the Musical Olympus Foundation. His current spouse is Elena Mirtova (opera singer, soprano).

=== Yevgeny Roldugin ===
Yevgeny Roldugin, Segei Roldugin's older brother, attended the KGB training school with Putin in the 1970s and later returned to the Latvian SSR and worked as KGB. (Note: In the Latvian KGB branch with Yevgeny Roldugin, Yuri Simonkov (also spelled Yuri Simonenkov) owned the business Skonto with other KGB officials; Multibank until 2008, the bank was under sanctions in the United States in 2005; a joint business until 2016 with Sergey Nosov who is a close advisor to Vladimir Putin; and, through Simonenkov's wife, he owns Sigmen, a Latvian rails provider with factories through Evraz and ArcelorMittal in Russia and Spain, that since February 2019 provides nearly all the rails for Lithuanian Railways, LG (Lithuanian: Lietuvos Gelezinkeliai) which is building the Rail Baltica railways network in the Baltic to connect with European railway providers in the European Union.) On 15 November 2020, Yevgeny Roldugin died from COVID-19 in Riga, Latvia. In Riga, Yevgeny had been head of Gazprom in Latvia since 6 April 2009 when Gazprom opened its Latvian office. Previously, he was at Latvijas Gaze as head of the industrial safety and labor protection department.
