= Nikolay Korolyov (nationalist) =

Russian nationalist (born 1981)

- Born: Nikolay Valentinovich Korolyov; 31 March 1981 (age 45); Moscow, Soviet Union
- Other names: Nicola, the 55th
- Conviction: Terrorism
- Penalty: Life imprisonment

Details
- Victims: 13
- Country: Russia
- Weapon: Improvised explosive

Nikolay Valentinovich Korolyov (Russian: Николай Валентинович Королёв) (born 31 March 1981 in Moscow) is a Russian radical nationalist, old believer, cossack, and leader of the Neo-Nazi terrorist organization Spas (Russian: Спас). He was sentenced to life in prison for organizing and committing a number of particularly serious crimes. Korolyov was one of several people originally suspected of orchestrating the explosion at Cherkizovsky Market, including also Oleg Kostyrev, Ilya Tikhomirov, and Valery Zhukovtsov. According to the Moscow prosecutor's office, Korolyov had already been charged with the murder of two or more people on the grounds of ethnic, racial, and religious hatred.
