= Ilham Rahimov =

Azerbaijani and Russian legal scholar and entrepreneur (born 1951)

Ilham Rahimov İlham Rəhimov

Personal details
- Born: January 14, 1951 (age 75) Garakhanly, Tovuz District, Azerbaijan SSR, Soviet Union
- Education: Saint Petersburg State University Faculty of Law
- Occupation: Legal scholar, entrepreneur

Ilham Mammadhasan oghlu Rahimov (Azerbaijani: İlham Məmmədhəsən oğlu Rəhimov; born on January 14, 1951, Azerbaijan Republic) is an Azerbaijani and Russian legal scholar, entrepreneur, and author of scientific works on criminology.

In 1988, Rahimov received a Doctor of Law degree from the Leningrad State University Faculty of Law. From 1992 to 1996, he headed the Azerbaijani Institute of Forensic Expertise and Criminology. From 1996 to 1999, he was the vice-rector of the Higher Diplomatic College in Baku.

Rahimov has been one of Vladimir Putin's closest friends since their joint studies at the Leningrad State University. In 1999, almost immediately after Putin was appointed as the Chairman of the Russian Government, Rahimov left his position as a vice-rector at the Higher Diplomatic College in Baku and started business in the commercial real estate sector. Up until 2018, Rahimov was a minority shareholder (10-15%) in several major projects of the holding company Kievskaya Ploshchad, including the shopping center Evropeyskiy, Hotel Ukraina, the market Sadovod, and other large-scale commercial areas in Moscow. In 2014, Rahimov was included in the Forbes list of the richest businessmen in Russia, with his wealth estimated at $500 million.

Rahimov is also associated with constructing major real estate objects for Vladimir Putin, including the "first dacha" in Parkove village near Yalta and "Putin's Palace" in Gelendzhik. In 2023, Ilham Rahimov was included in the Canadian sanctions list for contributing to Russia's invasion of Ukraine.

== Biography ==
Ilham Rahimov is one of the most discreet billionaires in Russia. He was born in 1951 in the village of Karakhanly in the Tovuz District in the northwest of Azerbaijan, near the border with Armenia. His uncle held a position of a local prosecutor.

At 19, Ilham Rahimov was enrolled in the Faculty of Law at Saint Petersburg State University, where he studied from 1970 to 1975. During that time, Rahimov became close friends with his classmate Vladimir Putin. Back then, Rahimov was the head of group YF-1, and Putin was in group YF-4. They attended classes and judo sessions together and became close family friends. From the few interviews and testimonies of their classmates, it is known that Rahimov often visited Putin's apartment in Saint Petersburg. In turn, Putin also visited Azerbaijan where he stayed at Rahimov's family house. Putin's and Rahimov's close circle of friends also included Victor Khmarin (future Rahimov's business partner and entrepreneur close to the government), Vitaly Mozyakov (a lieutenant general of justice), Nikolai Egorov (co-founder of the law firm "Egorov Puginsky Afanasiev & Partners" and entrepreneur), and Alexander Bastrykin (chairman of the Investigative Committee of Russia).

During his studies at the Faculty of Law, Rahimov specialized in criminal law and considered the head of the law department Nikolai Belyaev as his mentor. After graduating from the university, Rahimov continued his education on a postgraduate level at the Leningrad State University, while simultaneously working at the Leningrad Prosecutor's Office. In 1988, he received a Doctor of Sciences degree (equivalent to PhD).

After that, Rahimov moved to Baku. There he started working at Azerbaijan's Ministry of Justice. From 1992 to 1996, Rahimov was the head of the Azerbaijani Institute of Forensic Expertise and Criminology. In 1996, Rahimov was appointed vice-rector of the Higher Diplomatic College in Baku. In the early 90s, he became close friends with the future Prosecutor General of Azerbaijan, Eldar Hasanov. Although Vladimir Putin was building his career in the KGB at this time, Rahimov and he continued to communicate closely. Later, Rahimov stated that he has been friends with Vladimir Putin for more than "forty years."

Rahimov was a member of the opposition Azerbaijan Democrat Party. In 2002, he ran for a seat in the National Assembly of Azerbaijan from the Tovuz district but was not elected. Since then, he has not been actively involved in the country's politics.

== Business ==
After Vladimir Putin was appointed Prime Minister in November 1999, Ilham Rahimov began actively engaging in business and left his position as a vice-rector of the Higher Diplomatic College in Baku. Right after that, he appointed the legal department head at the oil company Lukoil-Azerbaijan.

=== Alleged real estate for Vladimir Putin ===
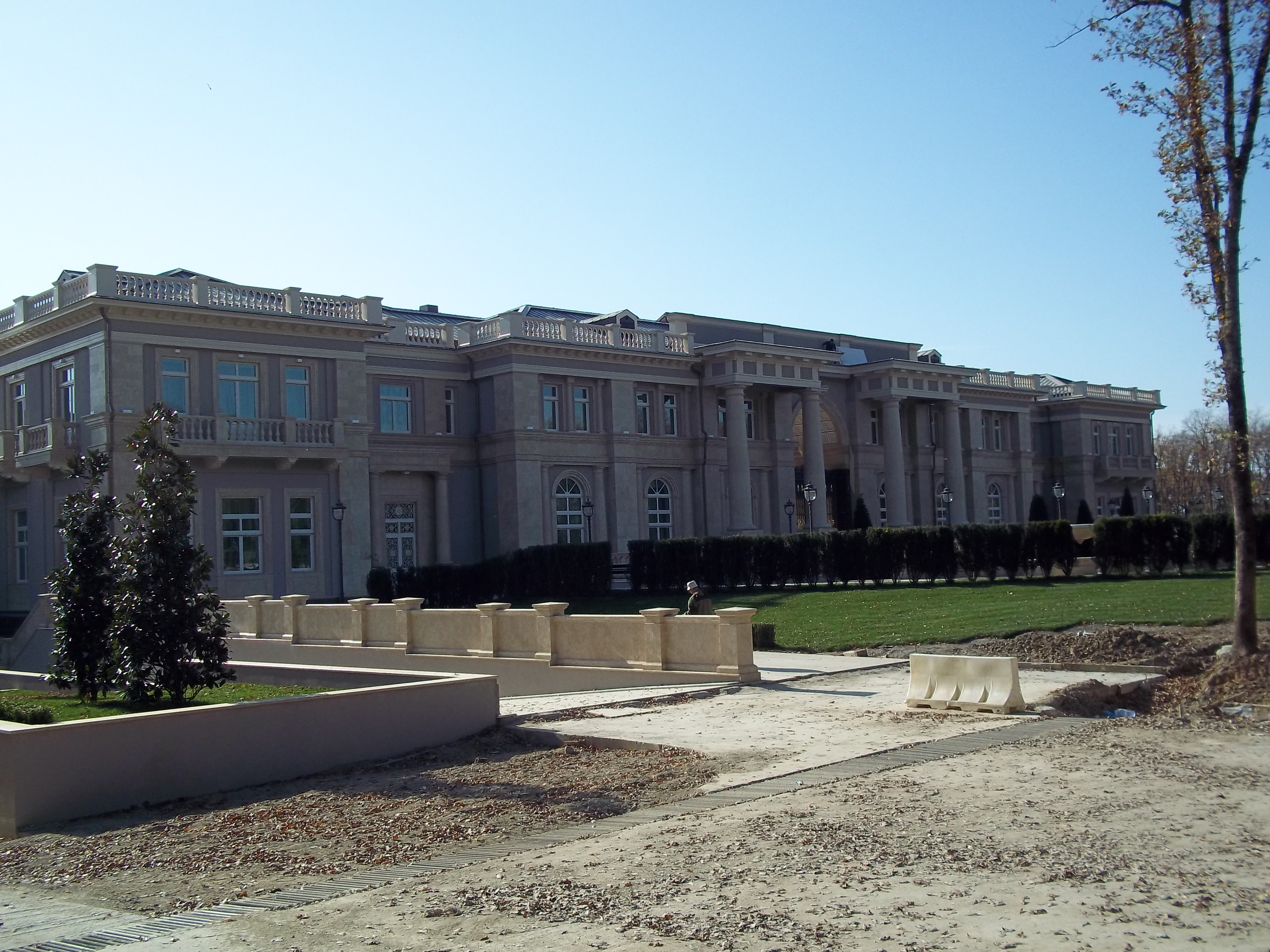
"Putin's Palace" in Gelendzhik, the construction of which was co-financed by Rahimov's firm

In 2002, Ilham Rahimov founded LLC "Rissko" in Moscow. In 2003, the company acquired 20 hectares in the village of Parkove, near Yalta. Soon, a large-scale construction of a luxury hotel started there. By the end of 2005, 26% of "Rissko"'s shares were transferred to LLC "Ozon," a subsidiary of "Gazprom Dobycha Orenburg." In 2007, LLC "Ozon" bought out "Rissko" from Rahimov for 2.3 billion rubles. In 2011, the hotel 'Crimean Breeze' was opened (Russian: Крымский бриз), comprising a complex of elite villas and apartments, with the cost of stay in 2014 ranging from 120 to 300 thousand rubles per night. Ukrainian media described the site in Parkove as one of Putin's first "palaces." During the construction of the hotel, numerous violations were identified: construction was carried out already at the design stage, and builders did tree cutting without any legal authorization.

In 2015, Ilham Rahimov, in partnership with two of his university classmates and friends of Vladimir Putin, Victor Khmarin and Nikolai Egorov, founded the company "Investment Solutions". An investigation by the Anti-Corruption Foundation revealed that in 2019, the company provided approximately 5 billion rubles to the St. Petersburg firm "Binom" (owned by oligarch Yury Kovalchuk) for the construction of "Putin's Palace" in Gelendzhik.

=== Shares in "Kievskaya Ploshchad" ===
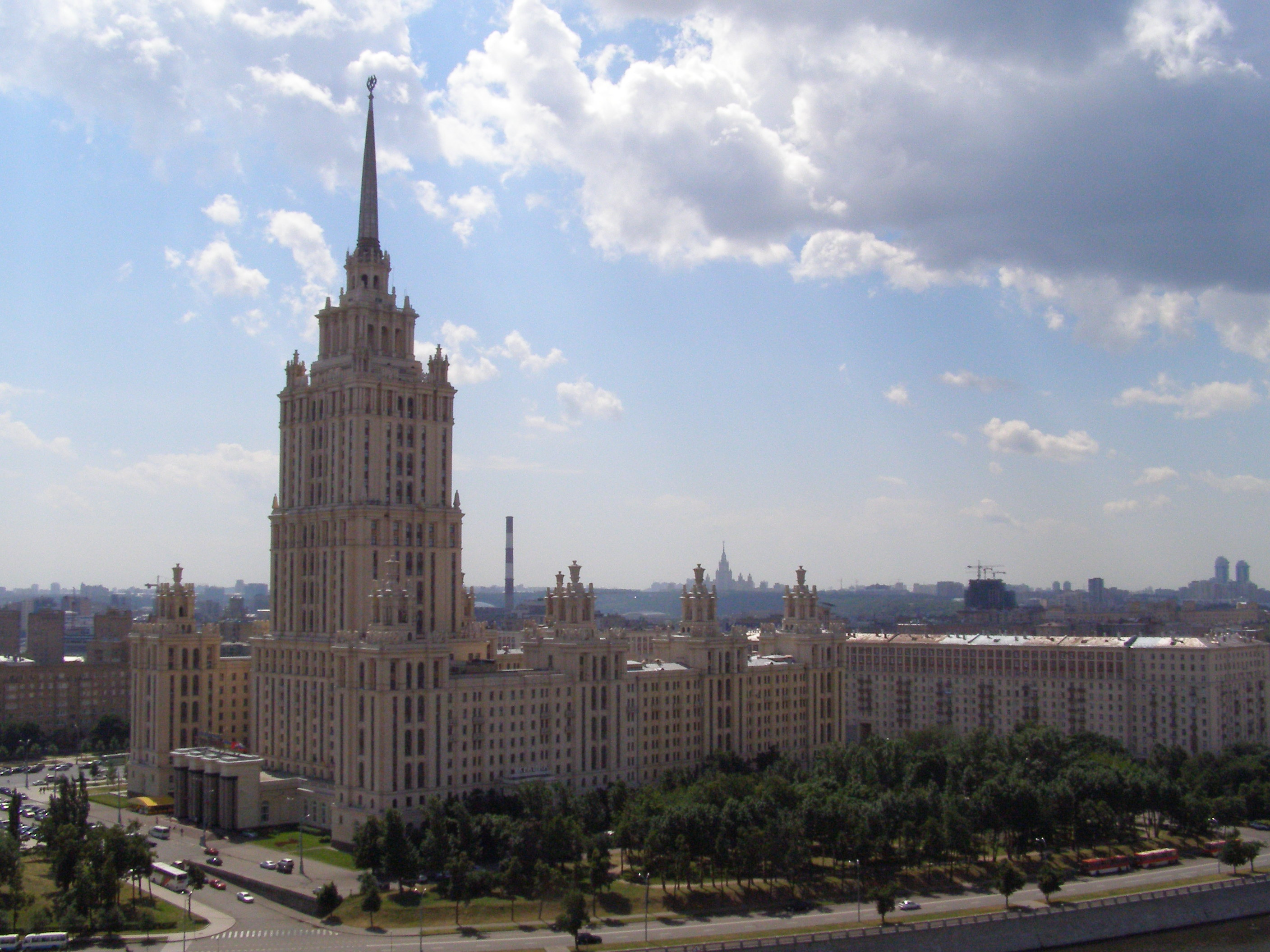
Ukraina Hotel in 2006

From the early 2000s until 2018, Ilham Rahimov had shares in the Kievskaya Ploshchad holding, owned by billionaires God Nisanov and Zarakh Iliev. According to the Forbes investigation, Rahimov met the Nisanov family while vacationing in the Kubinsky district of Azerbaijan. There, he became friends with Semyon Nisanov, the director of the local cannery and God Nisanov's father. Since 1999, the joint business of God Nisanov and Zarakh Iliev, which began with wholesale trading at the Cherkizovsky Market, has significantly expanded. By the early 2000s, Nisanov and Iliev became co-owners of the whole market.

Rahimov owned shares (approximately 10-15%) in each major holding project, managing leading Moscow markets, shopping centers, and hotels. Kievskaya Ploshchad holds leading positions in the commercial real estate market. Rahimov's assets included shares in such facilities as the Sadovod market, "Panorama" shopping center, Evropeyskiy shopping center, Hotel Ukraina, and the Central Market. The fortune of each of the holding's founders, Zarakh Iliev and God Nisanov, is estimated by Forbes in March 2024 at $3.3 billion. Meanwhile, the "Sadovod" market was also involved in significant flows of illegal cash and for a long time served as the largest center in Moscow for cashing out cryptocurrency, with Chinese traders being the main participants in the crypto business. As of 2019, monthly transactions for such operations could reach up to 600 billion rubles.

In 2008, Rahimov became the owner of the company "Grandtitul," (Russian: Грандтитул) which in 2004 acquired the "Grand" shopping center, a major furniture center in Moscow, as a part of the "Kievskaya Ploshchad" group. Before that, the "Grand" shopping center was one of the key elements in the high-profile case of smuggling italian furniture, known as the "Three Whales" case, that involved law enforcement and customs officials. Vladimir Putin personally intervened in 2004 to resolve the scandal. The company manages the "Grand" and "Grand-2" furniture shopping centers, and also became one of the developers of Moscow-City. In 2015, it was revealed that the company "Trade Investments," part of the "Kievskaya Ploshchad" structure and in which Rahimov also had a share, won a 4 billion rubles tender announced by Moscow authorities for the construction of multifunctional migration centers.

However, a representative of Nisanov and Iliev denied the accusations that Ilham Rahimov used his acquaintance with Vladimir Putin for business benefits.

In 2018, Rahimov left the group of co-owners of the "Kievskaya Ploshchad". A new business partner of Nisanov and Iliev became Rahimov's partner from the Azerbaijani law firm "Fina."

=== Antipinsky Refinery ===
In 2019, the media reported that Ilham Rahimov purchased a stake in the Antipinsky Refinery in Tyumen. In 2016, according to Forbes, the enterprise ranked 43rd in revenue among Russia's 200 largest private companies. Exact information about the co-owners is hidden through a chain of offshore companies in the Cayman and the British Virgin Islands. However, according to estimates by the Russian media "Kommersant," Rahimov owned no more than 7.4% of the refinery.

== Wealth ==
The exact net worth of Ilham Rahimov is unknown. However, in 2014, he was listed among the wealthiest entrepreneurs in Russia, with a fortune of $500 million. The estimation of his wealth was made solely based on the value of his shares in the real estate assets of "Kievskaya Ploshchad".

== Involvement in Azerbaijani-Russian relations ==
I communicate with Putin as if he were my classmate, not as a politician and the head of state... Yes, when we meet with Putin, we talk about it, I convey to him my personal position. Naturally, as an Azerbaijani, the Karabakh issue is also my pain.

— Interview with Ilham Rahimov

Being Azerbaijani, Ilham Rahimov actively advocated for the annexation of Nagorno-Karabakh to Azerbaijan. In 2020, amid the escalation in Nagorno-Karabakh, an incident known as the "apricot war" occurred at the "Food City" market, controlled by "Kievskaya Ploshchad". Then, Armenian exporters were prohibited from selling their products on the territory owned by Azerbaijanis. Later, in an interview with the Azerbaijani media Musavat, Rahimov stated that the damage inflicted on the Armenian side amounted to "hundreds of millions" (rubles).

Prior to that, in 2010, Rahimov visited Ramil Safarov in prison. Safarov is an Azerbaijani officer convicted of murdering Armenian Gurgen Margaryan during language courses in Hungary. Additionally, together with Eldar Hasanov and Victor Khmarin, Rahimov participated in the activities of the "International Fund for Cooperation and Partnership of the Black and Caspian Seas," engaging in various projects, including the development of feed additives.

== Personal life ==
Little is known about Ilham Rahimov's personal life. It is believed that Sevinj Ilham qizi Rahimova is Rahimov's daughter. She also owns shares in the "Kievskaya Ploshchad" holding. As of 2019, Rahimova lived in Moscow on Klimashkina Street in an apartment previously belonging to the founder of "Capital Group" Vladislav Doronin. It is the same building where Alina Kabaeva also had an apartment.

Azerbaijani media reported that Rahimov was one of the first in Baku to start driving a Maybach car. After the death of his wife, he built a hospital in her memory in his native village of Jilovdarly in the Tovuz district of Azerbaijan.

== Sanctions ==
After the Russian invasion of Ukraine, the National Agency on Corruption Prevention of Ukraine proposed introducing international sanctions against Rahimov. The justification states that Rahimov conducts "commercial activities in sectors of the economy that provide a high revenue part of the budget of the Russian Federation, which is responsible for the war in Ukraine, i.e., is a significant source of income for waging war."

In April 2023, Canada included him in its sanctions list.

== Selected academic publications ==
- "The theory of prediction" (Russian: Теория судебного прогнозирования) (Baku, 1987)
- "The philosophy of punishment and determination of its amendment " (Baku, 1999)
- "Philosophy of Crime and Punishment" (Russia, Moscow, 2012; Turkish, Istanbul, 2014, English 2015)
- "Crime and Punishment" (Russian: Преступность и наказание) (Moscow, 2012)
- "On the Morality of Punishment" (Russian: О нравственности наказания) (Saint Petersburg, 2016 in Russian). The book is a continuation of the author's reflections on the philosophical essence of punishment, previously outlined in the books "Crime and Punishment" (Moscow, 2012), "Philosophy of Crime and Punishment" (Saint-Petersburg, 2013)
- "Theoretical and Practical Problems of Correctional Labor Impact" (Russian: Теоретические и практические проблемы исправительно-трудового воздействия) (Baku, 1981);
- "The Immortal Death Penalty" (Russian: Бессмертная смертная казнь) (Saint Petersburg, 2017);
- "The Modern State in the Era of Global Transformations" (Russian: Современное государство в эпоху глобальных трансформаций) (Saint Petersburg, 2019).

== Awards and Honorary Titles ==
- "Honored Lawyer of the Republic of Azerbaijan" (2011);
- The International Order of the "Crescent and Star" of the first degree and the title of Knight of the International Order of the "Crescent and Star" by the French International Association "International Committee for the Protection of Human Rights" (2011);
- Award of the International Fund for Cooperation and Partnership of the Black Sea and the Caspian Sea (IFCPS) "For Special Contribution to the Development of IFCPS Activities" (March 2014);
- Honorary doctorate degree (honoris causa) from the Bulgarian Academy of Sciences (November 2014);
- Russian "Themis — 2014" award in the category "International Cooperation" (February 2015);
- Title of Honorary Professor of the Academy of the Investigative Committee of Russia (2016);
- The Mahmoud Kashgari International Foundation Award for contributions to deepening Russian-Azerbaijani and Turkish-Azerbaijani relations (September 2017);
- Honorary Professor of the Smolny Institute of the Russian Academy of Education (2019);
- Honorary Professor of the Institute of Legislation and Comparative Law under the Government of the Russian Federation (2021);
- Foreign Member of the Russian Academy of Sciences (2022).
