= Hotel Ukraina, Moscow =

Hotel in Moscow, Russia

Hotel Ukraina
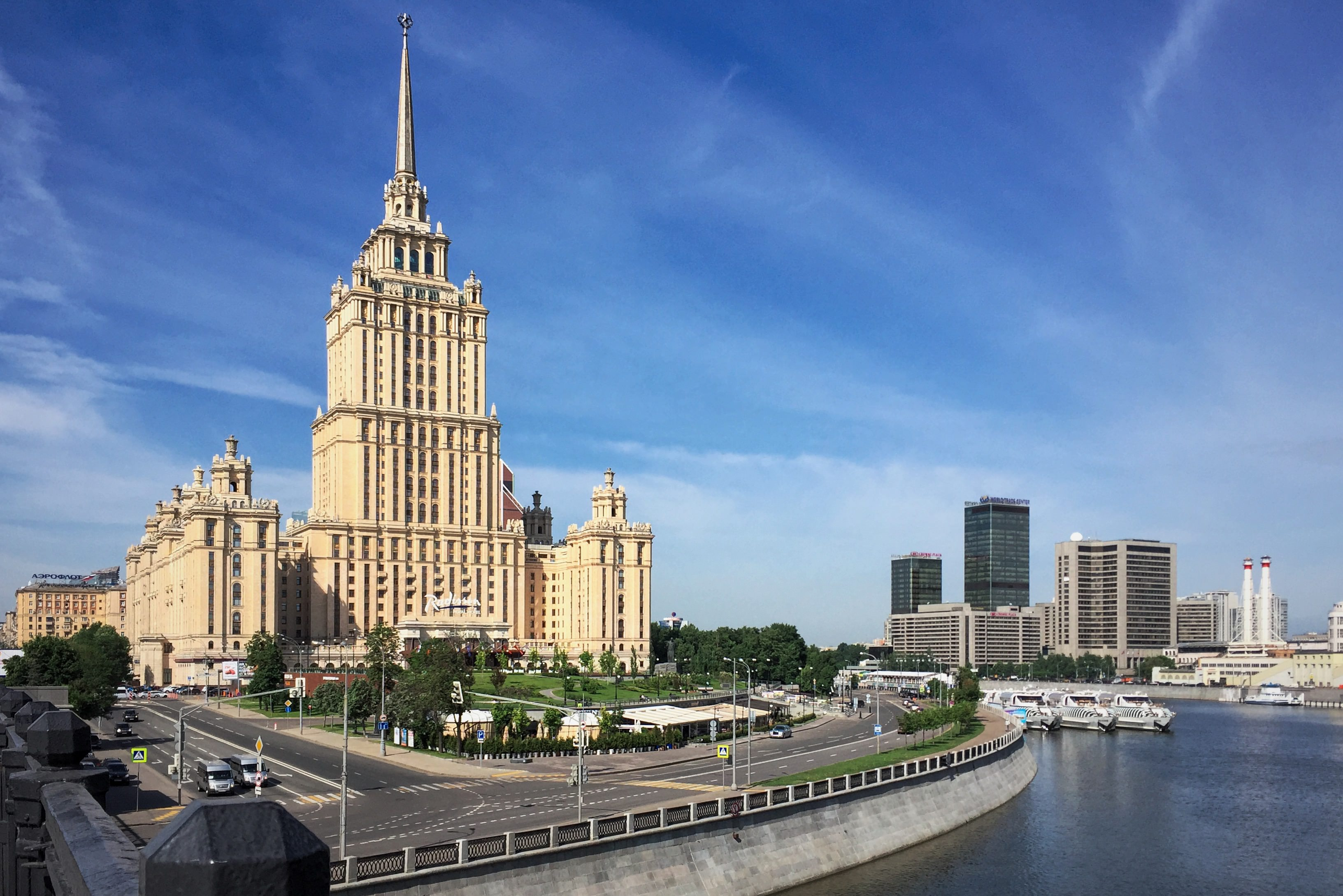
- Interactive map of the Hotel Ukraina area
- Alternative names: Radisson Collection Hotel, Moscow
- Hotel chain: Radisson Collection

General information
- Architectural style: Stalinist style
- Location: Moscow, Russia, 2/1 Kutuzovsky Prospekt
- Coordinates: 55°45′06″N 37°33′58″E
- Opened: May 1957
- Renovated: 2007–2010
- Owner: God Nisanov and Zarakh Iliev
- Operator: Radisson Hotel Group

Height
- Height: 206 m (676 ft)

Technical details
- Floor count: 34

Design and construction
- Architects: Arkady Mordvinov; Vyacheslav Oltarzhevsky

Other information
- Number of rooms: 497
- Number of suites: 38
- Number of restaurants: 5

Website
- https://www.ukraina-hotel.ru/en/

Hotel Ukraina (Russian: Гостиница Украина, romanized: Gostinitsa Ukraina), also known as the Radisson Collection Hotel, Moscow (Russian: Рэдиссон Коллекшен Отель, Москва), is a five-star luxury hotel in Moscow, situated on a bend of the Moskva River. The hotel is one of the "Seven Sisters", a group of Stalin-era skyscrapers of Moscow, and stands 206 metres (676 ft) tall. It is the tallest hotel in Russia, the tallest hotel in Europe, and the 42nd-tallest hotel in the world. It is a Radisson Collection hotel.

== History ==
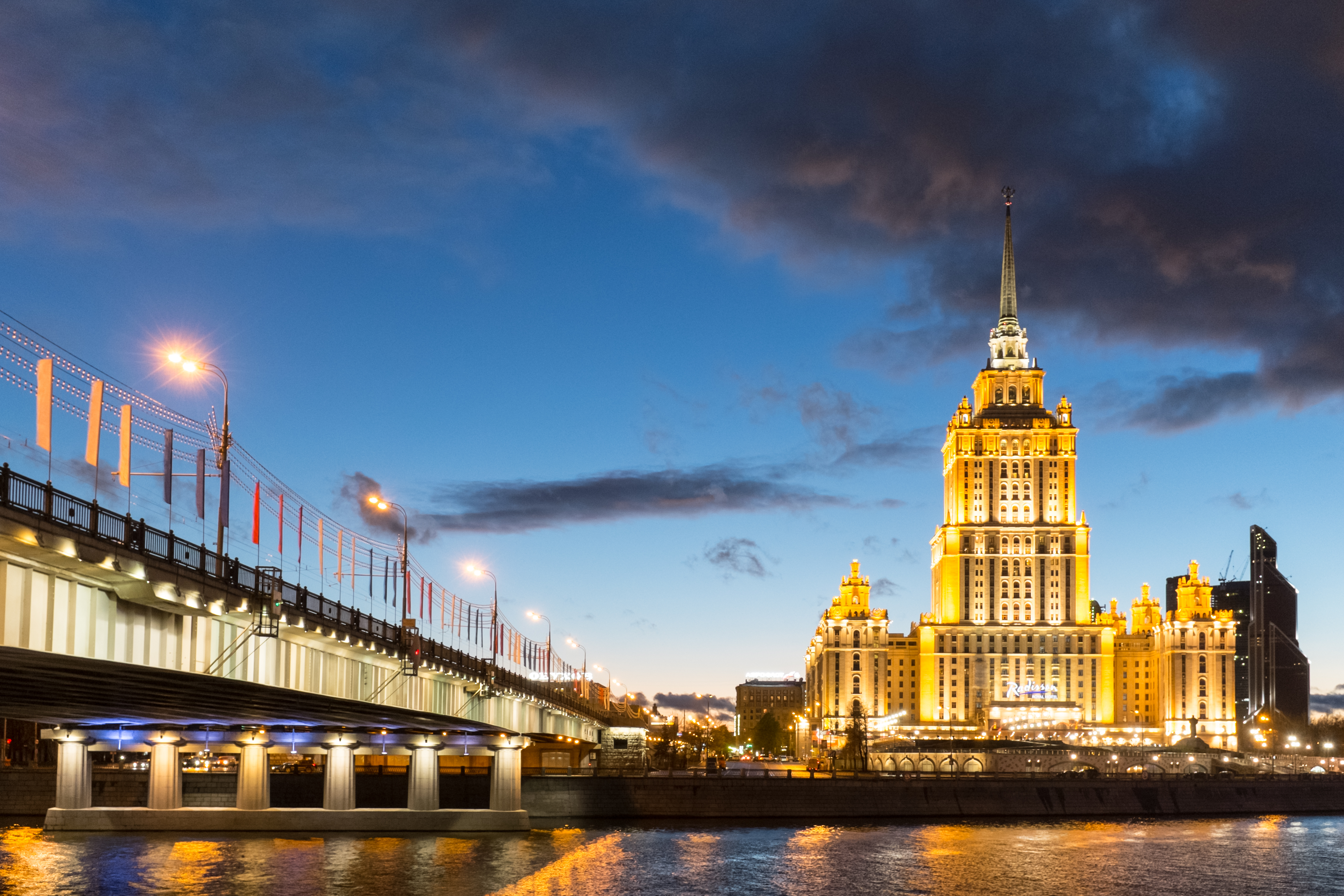
Novoarbatsky Bridge and Hotel Ukraina

Hotel Ukraina was commissioned by Joseph Stalin. It was designed by Soviet architects Arkady Mordvinov and Vyacheslav Oltarzhevsky, and is the second-tallest of the neoclassical Stalin-era "Seven Sisters", with 34 stories. Construction of the building was completed in 1957. It remained the tallest hotel in the world for 21 years, from its completion until the opening of the Westin Peachtree Plaza Hotel in Atlanta, Georgia, United States, in 1976.

=== Background ===
Following the 1917 revolution, domestic architects in Moscow initiated discussions regarding the construction of high-rise buildings. Shortly thereafter, there were a number of proposed projects like the skyscraper project of the Supreme Economic Council building on Lubyanka Square, designed by Vladimir Krinsky in 1923. In the same year, the Vesnin brothers proposed a project for the Palace of Labor, whose high-rise building was a tower 132 metres (433 ft) high.

The government supported the architects' aspirations to reconstruct the capital of the Soviet Union. In 1940, architect Dmitry Chechulin unveiled a draft for a 24-story public building on the Dorogomilovsky Bend of the Moskva River, where Hotel Ukraina was later erected. The sketches were featured in the magazine "Construction of Moscow". However, all the preparatory work for this project advanced at a sluggish pace, and with the Third Reich's declaration of war on the USSR during World War II, the project was entirely put on hold.

=== High-rise project ===
On January 13, 1947, Joseph Stalin, as the Secretary of the Central Committee of the CPSU, signed the resolution of the Council of Ministers of the USSR titled "On the Construction of High-Rise Buildings in Moscow". The resolution specified the construction of a 26-story building with a hotel and residences on the Leningradskoye Highway near the Dynamo Stadium. Mordvinov, acting as a representative of the Committee on Architectural Affairs, presented the construction plan to the government for approval. Subsequently, the construction work was delegated to the Ministry of Construction of Heavy Industry Enterprises.

In subsequent development, the government opted to relocate the construction project to the Dorogomilovskaya settlement, an area characterized by barracks and wooden houses. This decision stemmed from the intention to establish a prominent high-rise structure at the junction of the Moskva River embankment and the strategically significant Kutuzov Avenue. In their planning, the designers considered not only the positioning of the roads but also incorporated the creation of a pier for the river fleet in close proximity to the hotel.

During the same period, the Stalinist skyscrapers were not constructed in isolation but were predominantly dispersed throughout the historical center of the capital. The intention behind these new high-rises was to act as architectural focal points of the city, akin to the role played by church bell towers and domes in pre-revolutionary Moscow. Dmitry Chechulin, the chief architect of Moscow, also considered the possibility that future skyscrapers could visually complement and "overlap" with each other in the cityscape.

== Construction ==
Like all skyscrapers constructed during the Stalinist era, the ceremonial laying of the first stone for the hotel took place on September 7, 1947, coinciding with the 800th anniversary of Moscow. However, actual construction did not commence until 1953. The construction of high-rise buildings in Moscow faced challenges stemming from three main factors. The initial issue revolved around the weak Moscow soil, primarily sandy loam, necessitating the construction of robust foundations. The second obstacle was the lack of relevant expertise among Soviet experts, with only a few architects like Oltarzhevsky possessing the required knowledge. Lastly, the country lacked the essential technical infrastructure to support such ambitious construction projects.

Given Stalin's close involvement in the project, significant advancements in technologies and mechanisms were developed or refined for high-rise construction. Specifically for Stalin's skyscrapers, a "box foundation" was devised, enabling the erection of the building without the need for massive reinforced concrete structures and vertical sedimentary joints. Workers were equipped with a concrete pump capable of delivering fresh mortar to a height of 40 m (130 feet), as well as with a UBK tower cranes with a lifting capacity of 15 tons that could ascend from floor to floor as the building progressed. These cranes were instrumental in constructing walls and installing large reinforcement blocks during the hotel's construction.

Specialized factories in Lyubertsy and Kuchin were established to manufacture reinforced concrete slabs, while the introduction of a metal frame necessitated the development of new wall materials such as "multi-hole" bricks and hollow ceramic stones. A facility in the village of Kudinovo was established to produce these materials.

As the hotel's construction followed that of other Stalinist skyscrapers, engineers and workers leveraged past experiences to streamline workflow processes. Mechanization played a key role at the construction site, with most cargo delivery operations being automated from arrival at the facility to transportation to the designated work areas. Due to its proximity to the Moskva River, additional efforts were required to drain the soil surrounding the future foundation of the building.

Well before the completion of the construction, it was decided, under the directive of Nikita Khrushchev, the first secretary of the Central Committee of the CPSU, that the hotel would be named "Ukraine" instead of its original design name, "Dorogomilovskaya" (meaning the "Hotel building in Dorogomilov"). This decision was made to symbolically commemorate the tercentenary of the Reunification of Ukraine with Russia in 1954.

=== Opening and operation ===
The grand opening of the hotel on Dorogomilovskaya Embankment took place on May 25, 1957. In early June, the newspaper "For the Cultural Trade" reported that Hotel Ukraina recognized as the largest hotel in Europe, boasted a total of 1,026 rooms. The hotel was esteemed for its prestige and primarily catered to accommodating foreign guests.

In 1964, a 10-meter monument commemorating the Ukrainian poet Taras Shevchenko was erected in the square in front of the main facade of the building. Sculptors Mikhail Gritsyuk, Yu. L. Sinkevich, A. S. Fuzhenko, along with architects A. A. Snitsaryov and Yu. A. Chekanuk, collaborated on the monument.

== Architecture and style ==
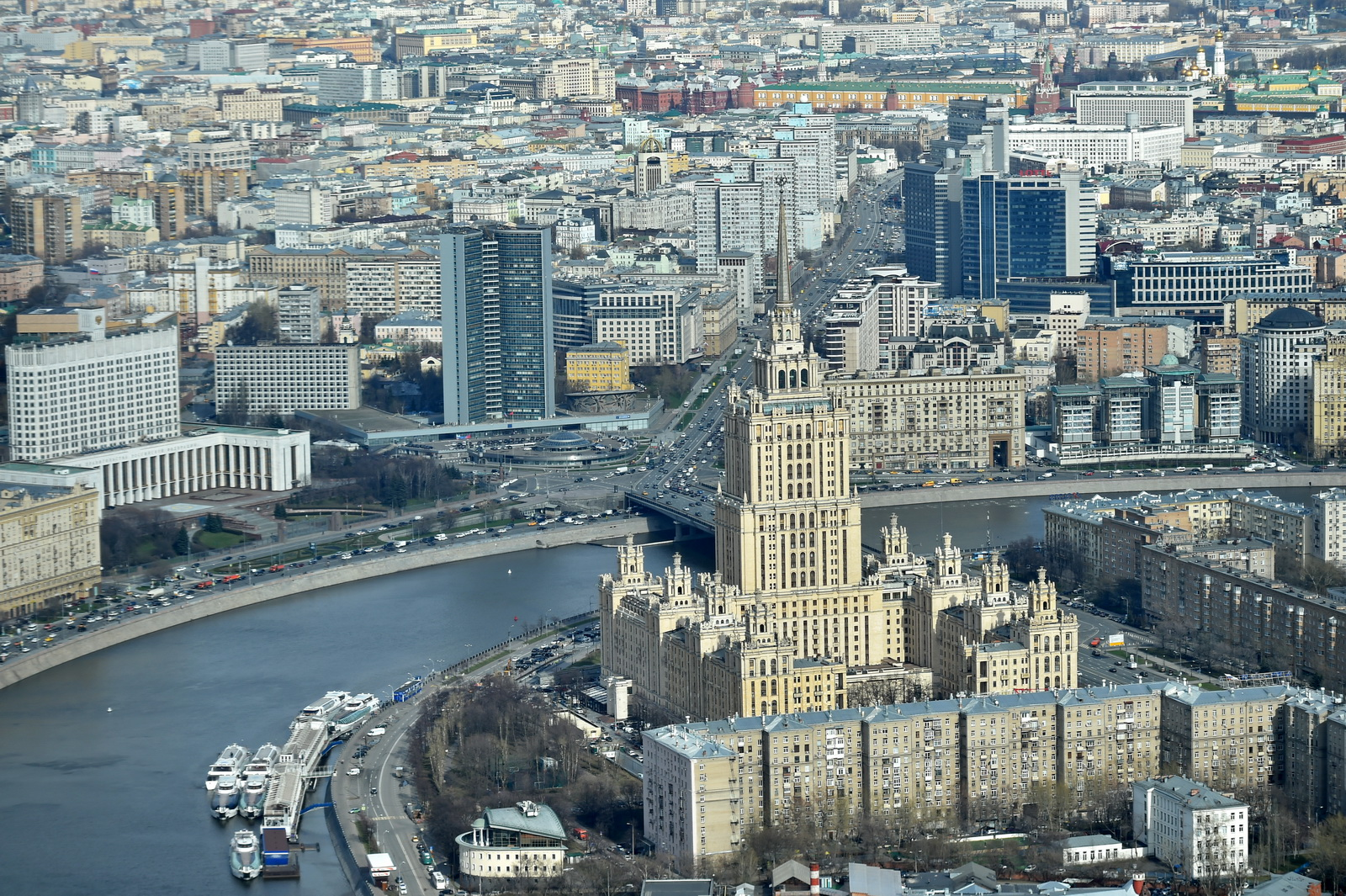
View of the Hotel Ukraina from the observation deck of the Federation Tower on the 89th floor.

In the 1930s, a new architectural style was formed in the Soviet Union, later called the Stalinist Empire style or simply Stalinist style. The distinctive traits of the buildings included their substantial size and decorative elements which extend to residential structures. The ornamentation blended classical orders with contemporary symbols like sickles, five-pointed stars, and stylized depictions of Soviet workers. Reflecting the opulence and style of the architectural design, the hotel stood as a monument of the Stalin era, attributed to the architect Oltarzhevsky.

With the inclusion of a 73-meter (240 ft) spire, the total height of the building reaches 206 meters (676 ft). The hotel is designed in a U-shaped configuration. The central section houses the hotel itself, while the side wings, varying in height from 9 to 11 floors, accommodate 255 apartments featuring 2–4 rooms each. Additionally, two five-room apartments are situated within the building. The central tower comprises 34 floors.

The hotel has intricate decoration throughout. Initially, the rooms varied in size and luxury, ranging from single 12 m^{2} (130 sq ft) rooms to three-room suites, each complete with a living room and two ensuite bedrooms. A notable feature of the hotel was the winter garden with a fountain located on the second floor. Within the hotel premises, amenities included a post office, telegraph services, a savings bank, as well as several shops offering books, flowers, and theater-related items. Following the hotel's inauguration, an exclusive cafe operated on the upper levels, surrounded by an open terrace providing panoramic views of the city. The hotel staff consisted of 800 employees.

The building featured advanced engineering systems for the time, including centralized air conditioning in addition to the ventilation system. A centralized dust removal system was implemented throughout the entire building, with brushes and hoses in each room and apartment. Dust collected in these systems was directed through pipes to a vacuum cleaner station in the basement, where it was filtered and discharged into the sewage system, while the purified air was released back outside. Hand-held vacuum cleaners were also provided in the hotel. For heating, boilers were installed in the basement of the building. Furthermore, a telephone station with 10,000 numbers was housed within the hotel premises.

== Ownership ==
The hotel was acquired by billionaire property investor God Nisanov for £59 million during an auction in 2005. He co-owns it with Zarakh Iliev.

It closed in 2007 for a renovation and restoration. In 2009, the owners entered into an agreement with the Rezidor Hotel Group to oversee the management of the hotel under the name Radisson Royal Hotel, Moscow. Despite this, the hotel retains its original name for certain purposes.

== Restoration ==
Following a comprehensive three-year renovation, the hotel reopened on April 28, 2010. The restoration work preserved the façade while integrating modern technologies such as multi-level water cleaning systems and air circulation systems. The hotel moved to Radisson's elite Radisson Collection division in January 2019, and was renamed Radisson Collection Hotel, Moscow.

The hotel currently comprises 505 rooms, 38 apartments, 5 restaurants, a conference center, an executive floor, a banquet hall, a library, a spa & wellness center featuring a 50 m (160 ft) indoor swimming pool, and a fleet of Moskva River yachts.

The hotel houses approximately 1,200 original paintings by Russian artists of the first half of the 20th century, and on the first floor, there is a diorama titled Moscow – Capital of the USSR in a 1:75 scale, depicting the historical center of Moscow and its surroundings from Luzhniki to Zemlyanoi Val as they appeared in 1977, the year the artwork was created.

== Bibliography ==
- Dobrenkaya, M. (2013). Stalin skyscrapers in photographs: the construction and existence in the light of ideology. Messenger of the RSUH.
- Gatsunayev, K. (2015). Heroic-patriotic motifs in Moscow architecture 1940-1950. Moscow State Civil Engineering University.
- Ikonnikov, A. (1984). Architecture of Moscow. Twentieth century. Moscow Worker.
- Khazanova, V. (1963). From the history of Soviet architecture of 1917-1925. Academy of Sciences of the USSR.
- Kruzhkov, N. (2014). High-rise Stalinist Moscow. Tsentrpoligraf.
- Oltarzhevsky, V. (1953). Construction of high-rise buildings in Moscow. State publishing house of literature on construction and architecture.
- Vostryshev, M. (2011). All of Moscow from A to Z. Encyclopedia. Algorithm.
