= Troika laundromat =

Russian money laundering scheme

- Date: 2003–2013
- Location: Russia, Lithuania, European Union, and the United States
- Also known as: ŪkioLeaks
- Type: Money laundering, fraud
- Cause: Capital flight and laundering of illicit funds (including Sheremetyevo airport fuel fraud and tax rebate scam uncovered by Sergei Magnitsky)
- First reporter: OCCRP and 21 media partners
- Organized by: Troika Dialog
- Participants: Troika Dialog; Ūkio bankas; At least 75 offshore shell companies; Multiple European banks (including Deutsche Bank, Raiffeisen Bank International, ING Group, ABN AMRO, Rabobank)
- Outcome: Exposure of $4.8 billion paid into network ($8.8 billion in total transactions); Major stock declines and anti-money laundering (AML) regulatory scrutiny across European banks
- Deaths: 1 (Erich Rebasso)
- Website: www.occrp.org/en/project/the-troika-laundromat

Troika laundromat or ŪkioLeaks is a money laundering scheme organized by Russia's former largest investment bank Troika Dialog. This scheme allowed the flow of some $4.8 billion of funds from Russian companies and figures into Europe and the US between 2003 and early 2013. It was discovered by the Organized Crime and Corruption Reporting Project (OCCRP) with 21 media partners from Europe, North America, and South Korea in 2019.

== Investigation ==
The scheme was discovered in a large set of transactions and other documents collected by OCCRP and 20 media partners including 15min.lt. The findings draw on a massive – possibly the largest ever – leak of bank records, emails and contracts. Investigative journalists sifted through 1.3 million bank transactions between 233,000 companies and individuals, with a total value over $470 billion, dated between 2006 and 2012.

The scheme relied heavily on the now-defunct Lithuanian bank Ūkio Bankas, which hosted accounts for at least 35 of the shell companies. Troika Dialog "spun" money through multiple accounts to disguise its sources before transferring it to Ūkio Bankas, which facilitated further transfers. The investigation highlighted the brazen use of these funds, not only for financial concealment but also to purchase luxury assets and gain influence in high society across Europe.

=== Erich Rebasso ===
Between December 2006 and February 2008, Erich Rebasso, an Austrian lawyer used 150 individual transactions to send almost $96 million to laundromat accounts at Ūkio Bankas, a Lithuanian bank. Eventually, he stopped his involvement, but faced new troubles. When victims demanded repayment, Rebasso sought help from his Russian partners, but no assistance came.

In 2008, Rebasso sent a letter to the main Vienna headquarters of the Federal Criminal Police, the country's top law enforcement agency. In his five-page letter he confess that he has been used for criminal purposes and is willing to submit the matter to the required criminal review.

Rebasso's confessional letter had little effect. While police looked into the matter, it was two years later when they informed him that they had stopped the proceedings because they believed any potential crime had happened outside their jurisdiction and been committed by foreigners.

On July 26, 2012, two former police officers from Russia Pavel V. (35) and Alexander M. (31) ambushed Rebasso in Georg-Coch-Platz underground car park. Three months later, on October 20, 2012, his body was discovered in a forest near Vienna. The forensic report states Rebasso died from a broken thyroid cartilage, likely due to a headlock, possibly during his kidnapping. Whether the killing was intentional or the exact time of death couldn't be determined.

=== Sergei Magnitsky ===
More than $130 million was transferred through the Troika Laundromat by companies involved in the fraud that Magnitsky uncovered.

Sergei Magnitsky was detained in 2009 and died in custody after informing the authorities of the crime.

=== Sergei Roldugin ===
Sergei Roldugin, a Russian cellist, who was a childhood friend of Vladimir Putin, received a minimum of $69 million from companies associated with the Troika Laundromat. Additionally, he earned $11.6 million in cancellation fees from a series of 16 consecutive stock transactions.

== Scheme ==
A Russian investment bank named Troika Dialog (now known as Sberbank CIB) was established in the 1990s. In 2012, it was acquired by state-owned Sberbank. At least 75 companies were registered in tax haven British Virgin Islands by Troika Dialog. They were additionally incorporated under shell corporations in different tax havens.

In total, over $4.8 billion was paid into Troika network, however the value of transactions between the companies managed by Troika Dialog was an estimated $8.8 billion, suggesting money was spun around for a number of cycles before exiting.

In order to protect themselves, the organizers of this system used the identities of poor people such as Armenian workers in Moscow as unwitting signatories in the secretive offshore companies that ran the system. Those shell companies did operations with fake paperwork.

The laundromat let oligarchs and politicians to secretly buy from state-owned companies, to buy real-estates both in Russia and abroad, to buy yachts, to hire music superstars for private parties etc.

=== Connection with European banks ===
The Troika Laundromat implicated several European banks for lax anti–money laundering (AML) controls. At least 35 of total shell corporations had accounts in Lithuanian defunct bank – Ukio Bankas. But Western banks were also involved:

- According to German newspaper Süddeutsche Zeitung, over $889 million moved from Deutsche Bank accounts to Laundromat accounts between 2003 and 2017. This followed Deutsche Bank’s scrutiny in the Danske Bank scandal, raising questions about its AML compliance.
- Austria’s Raiffeisen Bank International was accused of ignoring red flags, with $634 million transferred from Ūkio Bankas and Danske Bank’s Estonian unit. The bank’s shares dropped significantly after the revelations, prompting an internal investigation.
- Dutch media, including Trouw and De Groene Amsterdammer, reported that hundreds of millions of euros passed through ING’s Moscow branch, while a former ABN Amro unit moved €190 million. Rabobank accounts received €43 million for a Dutch luxury yacht builder Heesen Yachts.
- German bank Commerzbank was noted for neglecting AML obligations, though specific transaction details were less documented.

=== Ruben Vardanyan ===
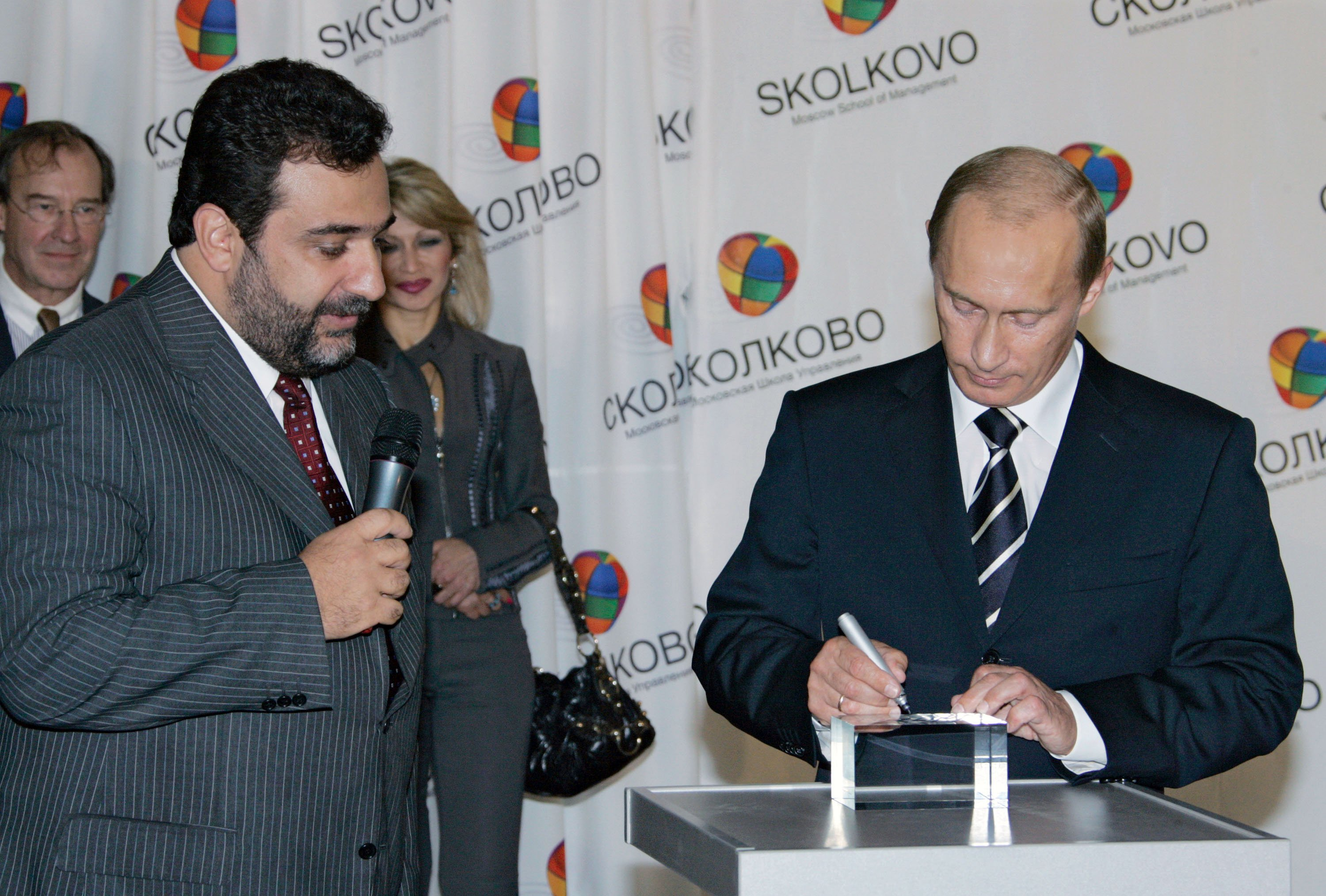
Vardanyan and Putin at the ceremony for beginning the construction of the Moscow School of Management in 2006

Ruben Vardanyan was the head of Troika Dialog at the time. He was a former adviser to Vladimir Putin and has close ties to him. Vardanyan has been listed by Forbes magazine as one of the richest persons in Russia. He supposedly provided a loan to a business that was a part of the plan, according to one document that bears his signature, but the OCCRP claims there is no "definitive evidence" that he was aware of the fraud.

According to Vardanyan, who was mentioned by the OCCRP, his bank did not do anything improper and was run similarly to other investment banks at the time. He also stated that he "couldn't possibly know" about every transaction carried out on behalf of clients. Vardanyan denied any wrongdoing and criticized the investigation as inaccurate and taken out of context. According to OCCRP, there is no evidence that he was investigated or charged in connection with the scheme.

Data shows that shell company named Quantus sent nearly $500,000 to pay Vardanyan's credit card bills. Other than that, his wife and mother-in-law received 935,000 euros and 900,000 euros respectively.

== Origins of money ==
OCCRP notes that at least money was of illegal origin.

=== Sheremetyevo airport fuel fraud ===
Sheremetyevo International Airport – the busiest airport in Moscow purchased fuel from a broad network of middlemen between 2003 and 2008, which greatly increased the price. Court records show that just in 2006 and 2007, phantom corporations made at least $200 million in pointless markups. The scam cost the Russian government approximately 1 billion rubles ($40 million) in missing tax income. The cost of fuel increased, which also increased the cost of airline tickets for the regular people.

=== Magnitsky fraud ===
The $230 million tax theft exposed by Magnitsky was partially laundered through the scheme, with $130 million traced to Laundromat accounts. The scheme enabled Russian elites to evade taxes, hide assets, and bypass restrictions, contributing to Russia’s wealth inequality, as noted by economist Thomas Piketty.

== See also ==
- Troika Dialog
- OCCRP
