= Sberbank CIB =

Multinational banking firm

- Formerly: Troika Dialog
- Type: Subsidiary
- Industry: Financial services
- Founded: 1991
- Headquarters: Moscow, Russia
- Number of locations: 3 countries
- Key people: Ruben Vardanyan (President)
- Products: Investment Banking
- Net income: $200 million
- Parent: Sberbank
- Website: Sberbank-cib.ru

Sberbank CIB is a multinational investment banking and asset management firm headquartered in Moscow, Russia, and a subsidiary of Sberbank. It was founded in Moscow in 1991, and was formerly known as Troika Dialog.

Sberbank CIB's core lines of business are securities sales and trading, investment banking, private wealth and asset management, retail distribution and alternative investments. The company focuses on markets in Russia and other CIS countries. It operates in more than 20 cities in Russia plus offices in Almaty, and Nicosia. Offices in London, New York City and Kyiv were closed in 2022, Troika Dialog's clients include leading Russian and international companies, financial institutions, government agencies and high-net-worth individuals.

== History ==
Troika Dialog was co-founded by the American Peter Derby (Russian: Петр Дерби; born August 1960 United States) (through his Troika Capital Corporation) and DialogBank in 1991. (Note: In 1983 after graduating from the New York University with a bachelors degree, Peter Derby (Russian: Петр Дерби; born 18 August 1960 United States) became an auditor at Chase Manhattan Bank in New York where he remained until 1985 when he took a job at National Westminster Bank as the director of corporate finance. He lived in Russia from 1990 until May 1998 when he returned to the United States and joined Irvington, New York's board of trustees. From April 2003 until May 2005, he served as Managing Executive for Operations and Management at the SEC.) He served as president and CEO of Troika Dialog from 1991 to 1996 and as chairman from 1996 to 1997. Previously, he helped found Dialog-Bank (Russian: Диалог-банка), which was the first licensed private Russian bank for international banking, serving as CFO of Dialog-Bank in 1990, becoming president and CEO from 1991 to 1997, and was chairman from 1997 to 1998 when the bank failed during the Russian financial crisis.

In 1997, Bank of Moscow (Russian: Банк Москвы) became a shareholder of the Troika Dialog owning 80% stake until 8 April 2002 when the Bank of Moscow sold its stake to the Troika Dialog's management. As founder and president of Bank of Moscow from 1995 until 2011 when VTB obtained control of Bank of Moscow, Andrei Borodin controlled the Troika Dialog.

From 1997 to 2002, its executive director was Andrei Andreivich Movchan and its managing director for investment banking was Sergey Viktorovich Skvortsov. (Note: Sergey Viktorovich Skvortsov (Russian: Сергей Викторович Скворцов; born 29 February 1964 Moscow, Soviet Union) graduated from Moscow State Institute of International Relations in 1986 with a PhD degree (Candidate of Economic Sciences) in International Economic Relations and established and headed Moscow Business Consultants (MBC) in 1988 leading it until 1997 while he advised 30 large scale projects receiving direct foreign investments in the Soviet Union and later Russia. He took an investments in emerging markets course at Merrill Lynch in the United States in 1992 and studied at the Advanced Management Program at the Institut européen d'administration des affaires (INSEAD) at Fontainebleau near Paris in 2005. While Sergey Skvortsov studied at Merrill Lynch in 1992, Rubin Vardanyan spoke with Skortsov and later while Skortsov returned to Moscow, he and Vardanyan became close. He worked at Troika Dialog from 1998 until 2013 and in March 2013 began working closely with Sergey Chemezov at Rostec. He is on the boards of OJSC KAMAZ (2006), Nestle Russia (2007), OJSC AvtoVAZ (June 2008) and Russian Helicopters. After Sergey Chemezov and Chairman of the Board Carlos Ghosn stepped down from the board of AvtoVaz on 23 June 2016, Skvortsov, who was deputy director of the Chemezov led Rostec, became Chairman of the Board of AvtoVaz.)

In May 2002, Alexander Mamut became a director. From 2003 to 2006, its executive director was Sergey Skvortsov.

From July 2007 until 2010, Andrey Vladimirovich Sharonov (Russian: Андрей Владимирович Шаронов) was chairman of the board and managing director of Troika Dialog. From April 2006 to March 2013 when he became a managing director for investments of the State Corporation Russian Technologies (Rostec) in April 2013, Sergey Skortsov was Troika Dialog's main partner and the president of Troika Capital Partners, which manages private equity and venture capital funds as well as Troika Dialog's own investments In 2008 under Skvortsov's leadership, Troika Dialog spearheaded the alliance of AvtoVAZ-Renault-Nissan and the partnership among KAMAZ OJSC, Daimler AG Concern and Rostec. In early April 2008, Rubin Vandaryan stated that Troika Dialog through Avtoinvest and Kamaz-Capital had the controlling stake in KamAZ. Since 2008, Troika Dialog was the nominal owner of AvtoVAZ and KamAZ for the beneficial owner Sergei Roldugin.

Troika Dialog has been privately owned by 109 employee partners. In March 2009, the company announced a strategic alliance with Standard Bank Group under which Standard Bank will become a 36% shareholder in Troika Dialog. In March 2011, Sberbank agreed to acquire Troika Dialog for US$1 billion, through the purchase of a 63.6 percent stake held by a shareholder group led by Ruben Vardanyan, and a 36.4 percent stake held by South Africa's Standard Bank. In 2012 the brokerage firm has been acquired by Russia's biggest bank, Sberbank, for US$1bn and continued operation as a part of its investment banking division.

=== Troika Laundromat ===
Also known as ŪkioLeaks, Troika Laundromat was a collection of 70 offshore shell companies whose controllers used them to move billions of dollars of private wealth from Russia to the west. About $4.6bn was paid into the Troika network, and a similar sum was paid out of it. It was operated by staff at an independent arm of the Russian investment bank Troika Dialog, which has now been merged with one of Russia's two big state-owned banks. The network was like a washing machine: money arrived from many sources. Most transfers were at Lithuania's Ukio Bank, closed by the authorities in February 2013.

== Operations ==
=== Capital markets ===
Equities. The company is active in Russian equity sales and trading.

Fixed Income. The company is an operator on the secondary ruble bond market and participant in the secondary Eurobond market. The company provides its clients with custody and clearing services for debt instruments, including settlement and clearing facilities DVP Euroclear.

Derivatives and Structured Products. The company, as the founding trading member of the RTS-FORTS index futures, continues to develop its role in the Derivatives marketplace.

Treasury. The company Treasury's key line of activity is hedging currency, interest rate and commodity risks faced by clients.

=== Research ===
The company's analysts actively monitor over 300 companies.

=== Investment banking ===
The company provides M&A services, including mergers, sell and buy-side advisory, leveraged buyouts, joint ventures, strategic alliances, and fairness opinions. It provides clients with services including arranging and leading primary bond issues and secondary market trading and in-depth Fixed Income market research. Troika has managed and been involved in transactions by Western and Russian companies, both blue chip and rapid growth issuers, such as RAO UES of Russia, Russian Railways, AvtoVAZ, KamAZ, Sukhoi Aviation Corporation, Novorossiysk Commercial Seaport, Power Machines, NOVATEK, URSA Bank, Vozrozhdenie Bank, Vimpelcom, IBS, Pharmacy Chain 36.6, Wimm-Bill-Dann, Nidan, World Class, Fortum.

=== Asset management ===
Founded in 1996, Troika Dialog Asset Management (TDAM) is a Russian asset manager.

=== Personal investments and finance ===
The company provides customer service to wealthy mass clients, offering a range of products.

=== Alternative investments ===
Troika Capital Partners (TCP) is an alternative investment business.

== The Russia Forum ==
Since 2008 Troika Dialog organizes an annual three-day forum held in Moscow – “The Russia Forum”. The Forum follows a similar format to that of the Davos meeting of the World Economic Forum (WEF) in bringing together representatives of the international investor's community, Russian political and business leaders, public figures, celebrities and media to discuss Russia's involvement in the challenges facing Russia and the global economy.

== US, EU, Switzerland, and Ukraine sanctions: 2014–2022 ==
After the annexation of the Crimean Peninsula by Russia in 2014, the Obama administration imposed sanctions on 12 September 2014, through the US Department of Treasury's Office of Foreign Assets Control (OFAC) by adding Sberbank and other entities to the Specially Designated Nationals List (SDN). This was done in concert with 31 July 2014 addition of Sberbank to the European Union sanctions list. Sanctions consist of access restriction to the EU and US capital markets.

On 27 August 2014, Switzerland imposed sanctions on Sberbank, its subsidiaries, and other Russian financial institutions.

On 22 December 2015, the United States imposed additional sanctions on Sberbank and its subsidiaries.

On 17 October 2016, Ukraine imposed sanctions against Sberbank Russia, Sberbank Leasing, and their payment systems Kolibri (Hummingbird), formerly Blitz (Ukrainian: «Колибри» стара назва – «Блиц») and Sberbank subsidiaries.

On 15 March 2017, the president of Ukraine imposed sanctions on Sberbank and its subsidiaries (and other Russian state-owned banks operating in Ukraine: VTB Bank, BM Bank, Prominvestbank, and VS Bank (Ukrainian: ВіЕс Банк)) as part of its continued sanctions on Russia for its annexation of Crimea and involvement in the War in Donbas.

On 25 February 2022 the banking licence of Sberbank in Ukraine was revoked.

On 1 April 2022 Sberbank CIB (UK) Limited went into Administration.

The affairs of Sberbank CIB USA, Inc were placed into wound down from April 2022.

== Sources ==
- SEC Press-release
- Troika's press-release
- Article in Vedomosti (in Russian)
