= 2006 Moscow market bombing =

2006 racist and nationalist terrorist attack in Moscow, Russia

- Cherkizovsky Market in 2008

- 2006 Moscow market bombing (Moscow Ring Road) 2006 Moscow market bombing (European Russia) 2006 Moscow market bombing (Russia)
- Location: 55°48′00″N 37°45′09″E; Izmaylovo District, Moscow, Russia
- Date: 21 August 2006
- Target: Market frequented by immigrants
- Attack type: Time bombing, right-wing terrorism
- Weapon: Improvised ammonal bomb
- Deaths: 13
- Injuries: 47
- Perpetrator: The Saviour

On 21 August 2006, a bombing took place at Cherkizovsky Market in Moscow, Russia. Thirteen people were killed and 52 were injured. In 2008, eight members of the Neo-nazi organization The Saviour (Спас) were sentenced for their roles in the attack.

Many traders at the market were from Asia and the Caucasus. As of 3 October 2006, 13 persons were confirmed dead: six citizens of Tajikistan, three citizens of Uzbekistan, two citizens of Russia, a citizen of Belarus, and a citizen of China. Eight people died at the scene, two in the hospital on the same day as the bombing, and three at a later date. The last person to die from the bombing was a man who was a citizen of Tajikistan, who died on 28 September 2006, in a hospital.

== Perpetrators and prosecutions ==
Two ethnic Russian suspects were arrested, and the general prosecutor of Moscow Yuri Syomin charged them with a racially motivated murder. The prosecutor's office officially indicted three university students, Oleg Kostyrev, Ilya Tikhomirov (both 20 years old) and Valeri Zhukovtsev (18 years old) on a racially motivated murder charge on 22 August.

According to the investigation, Kostyrev, Tikhomirov and Zhukovtsev were members of the nationalistic club The Saviour. The leader of the club, Nikolay Korolyov, and two more club members, Sergei Klimuk (a former FSB officer) and police academy student Nikita Senyukov, were co-indicted with Kostyrev, Tikhomirov and Zhukovtsev on the charges of murder, terrorism, organizing a criminal gang and illegal production and storage of explosives. Senyukov was also indicted for murder of an Armenian student on a subway. Allegedly, the conspirators have performed numerous explosions before, without any victims, blowing up Azerbaijani-owned stores, an Armenian refugee hostel and an office of a Georgian-born fortune teller.

On 15 May 2008, after a guilty verdict in the jury trial, Korolyov, Klimuk, Tikhomirov and Kostyrev received a sentence of life imprisonment. Zhukovtsev received 20 years in prison, Senyukov 13 years and the two students who actually delivered the bomb to the market, Dmitri Fedoseyenkov and Nikolai Kachalov only 2 years (the court decided they were not a part of the "criminal enterprise"). Later the same month, an appeal was filed with the Supreme Court by the convicted. Fedoseyenkov and Kachalov were released from prison on 20 March 2009 after serving their sentence. Other convict's appeals were still underway as of that time.

In August 2010, it was announced that Korolyov and Kostyrev were also suspects in the murder of a Chinese citizen by stabbing in Moscow on 19 May 2006.
