= Ūkio bankas =

Company in Lithuania

AB Ūkio bankas
- Company type: Public company
- Traded as: Nasdaq Baltic: UKB1L
- Industry: Financial services
- Founded: 1989
- Defunct: 2013
- Headquarters: Kaunas, Lithuania
- Key people: Gintaras Ugianskis (Chairman of the Board)
- Products: Retail banking, mortgage loans, corporate banking

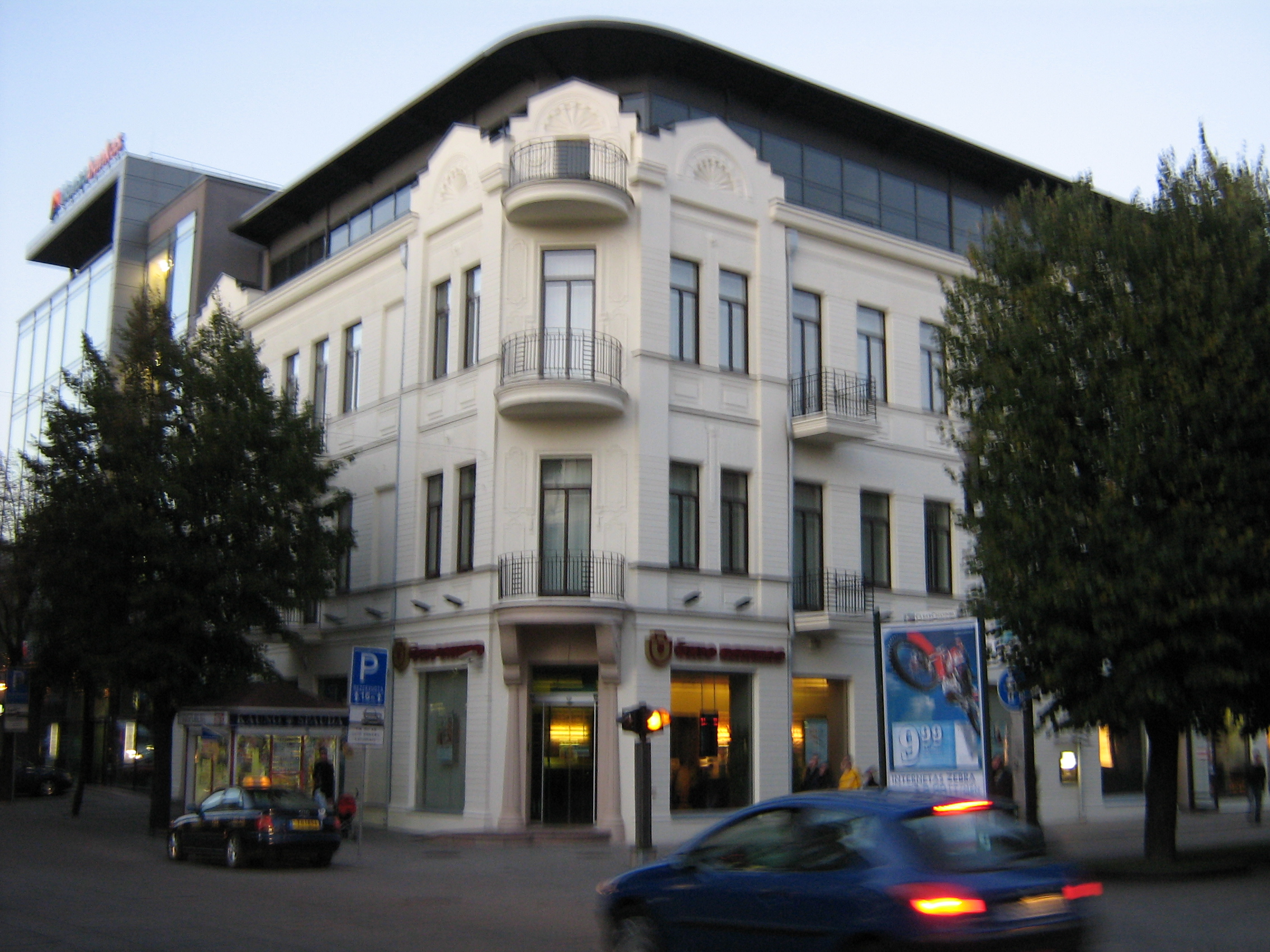
Ūkio Bankas branch in Laisvės Alėja, Kaunas

Ūkio Bankas was a Lithuanian commercial bank based in Kaunas. More than 50% of shares are owned by Lithuanian businessman Vladimir Romanov who therefore was in the control of the bank. It was the fifth largest and oldest private bank in Lithuania.

In October 2006, during an internet conference on the news portal Delfi.lt Vladimir Romanov announced his plans to sell his shares to the strategic investor. GE Money, a branch of General Electric, as one of the possible buyers was mentioned by Romanov.

In common with other banks Ūkio Bankas suffered from the effects of credit crunch and on 26 August 2008, rating agency Standard & Poor downgraded the banks status from stable to negative.

The organisation sponsored the Lithuanian football club FBK Kaunas and the Scottish team Hearts. Romanov was the owner of Hearts and a board member of FBK Kaunas.

Ūkio bankas has been associated with money laundering known as the ŪkioLeaks or Troika Laundromat. Reported by Organized Crime and Corruption Reporting Project (OCCRP) as the Russian Laundering Machine on 22 November 2011, Ūkio bankas used stolen Hermitage Capital Management subsidiaries (Note: Diron Trade LLP, a stolen company with a Great Britain postal box, assisted in $5.8 billion in money laundering transfers between Swedbank's baltic subsidiaries and Danske Bank's branch in Tallinn during 6 months in 2010 and 2011 according to SVT.) HSBC Guernsey Ltd, (Note: The Hermitage Capital Management owned company HSBC Guernsey Ltd was stolen in autumn 2007 by the Kazan, Tatarstan company OOO Pluton owned by Viktor Markelov.) OOO Rilend, OOO Parfenion, and OOO Markhaon (Note: Magnitsky maintained that the three Russia-based companies OOO Rilend, OOO Parfenion, and OOO Markhaon were stolen by Pluton Ltd. Viktor Markelov became owner of Pluton Ltd. in July 2007. The Hermitage Capital Management owned Cyprus-based subsidiaries, Glendora Holdings Ltd. and Kone Holdings Ltd., had 100% ownership of Riland Ltd. and Parfenion Ltd., and Makhaon Ltd., respectively.) to finance through Bristoll, Nomirex and Tormex, Al-Shabaab's Russian weapons built by Ukraine and pro Kremlin South Sudan militants weapons transfers from Ukraine. (Note: Under pro Russia, pro Kremlin, and pro Putin Viktor Yanukovych's second government, three weapons shipments were authorized for Mombasa, Kenya and the Kenyan military of 110 Ukraine built T-72 tanks and their shells, Grad rocket launchers, artillery pieces, anti aircraft guns, RPG-7 grenade launchers, ammunition, and five containers of AKM assault rifles. However, one shipment was hijacked by Al-Shabaab militants associated with Somali pirates and all three shipments' cargoes were sent to forces close to the pro Kremlin South Sudan militants. In September 2008, the MV Faina sailed from the Port of Oktyabrsk in Korabyelniy Raion (Ukrainian: Корабельный район) near Mykolaiv, Ukraine with armaments bound for Mombasa for the Kenya Defense Forces but the ship was hijacked by Somali pirates. It arrived in October 2007. On 12 December 2007, the MV Beluga Endurance with Phoenix Transport Services of Ukraine sailed from Oktyabrsk and arrived in Mombasa on 12 January 2008. In 2008, two arms shipments from Ukraine were intended to support pro Russia pro Kremlin, pro Putin forces in South Sudan during the civil war in South Sudan, but Ukrainian leaders lied about the destination of the armaments which United States diplomats denounced.) Sergei Roldugin was a client during this money laundering scheme.

Arnis Lagzdins was the compliance official at Ūkio Bankas during the money laundering and had previously held the same position at Parex Bank in Latvia when enormous sums were money laundered allegedly through Parex Bank and its sister firm Overseas Services by Vladimir Putin, Yuri Chaika, and the Russian Mafia including the Tambovskaya Organized Crime Group which looted various governments according to Spanish prosecutors.

In February 2013, the bank was revealed to have poor asset quality, weak risk management and a lack of proper operating data. The check also revealed that the bank had ignored the central bank's recommendation to reduce operating risks. On 12 February, the Bank of Lithuania in accordance with Art. 76 of the Law on Banks of the Republic of Lithuania (the “Law on Banks”) announced a partial and temporal restriction on activities (the “Moratorium”) of AB Ūkio bankas. Ūkio bankas was removed from the Lithuanian stock exchange later that month, with many of its assets and liabilities transferred to Šiaulių bankas.

== See also ==
- Economy of Lithuania
- Parex Bank
- Troika laundromat
- List of banks in Lithuania
