= The Savior (paramilitary organization) =

Defunct Russian militant organization

The Saviour (Russian: Спас, romanized: Spas, also translated as Salvation or The Redeemer) was a militant nationalist organization which claimed credit for the August 2006 Moscow market bombing. Media reports indicate that the market, located near Cherkizovsky, was targeted due to its high volume of Central Asian and Caucasian clientele.

Four members of The Saviour were sentenced to life imprisonment, while four others received lesser prison terms.

== See also ==
- Combat Organization of Russian Nationalists
- Combat Terrorist Organization
- NS/WP Crew
- National Socialist Society
- Primorsky Partisans
