= Kuchin =

Kuchin, feminine: Kuchina (Russian: Кучин, Кучина) is a Russian-language surname. The name is derived from the nickname Kucha (куча, literally: "heap", "pile", a reference to a big man) of the founder of the noble Russian Kuchin family of Polish descent.

Notable people with this surname include:

- Alexander Kuchin (1888–c.1913), Russian oceanographer
- Artyom Kuchin (born 1977), Kazakhstani football referee
- Mariya Kuchina (born 1993), Russian high jumper
