= Qaraxanlı, Aghjabadi =

Qaraxanlı
- Municipality
- Location within Azerbaijan Location within Karabakh Economic Region
- Coordinates: 40°04′29″N 47°07′48″E
- Country: Azerbaijan
- Rayon: Aghjabadi

Population
  - Total: 900
- Time zone: UTC+4 (AZT)
  - Summer (DST): UTC+5 (AZT)

Qaraxanlı (also, Qaraxanli and Karakhanly) is a village and municipality in the Aghjabadi Rayon of Azerbaijan. It has a population of 900.
