= Mardan Palace =

Luxury hotel in Antalya, Turkey

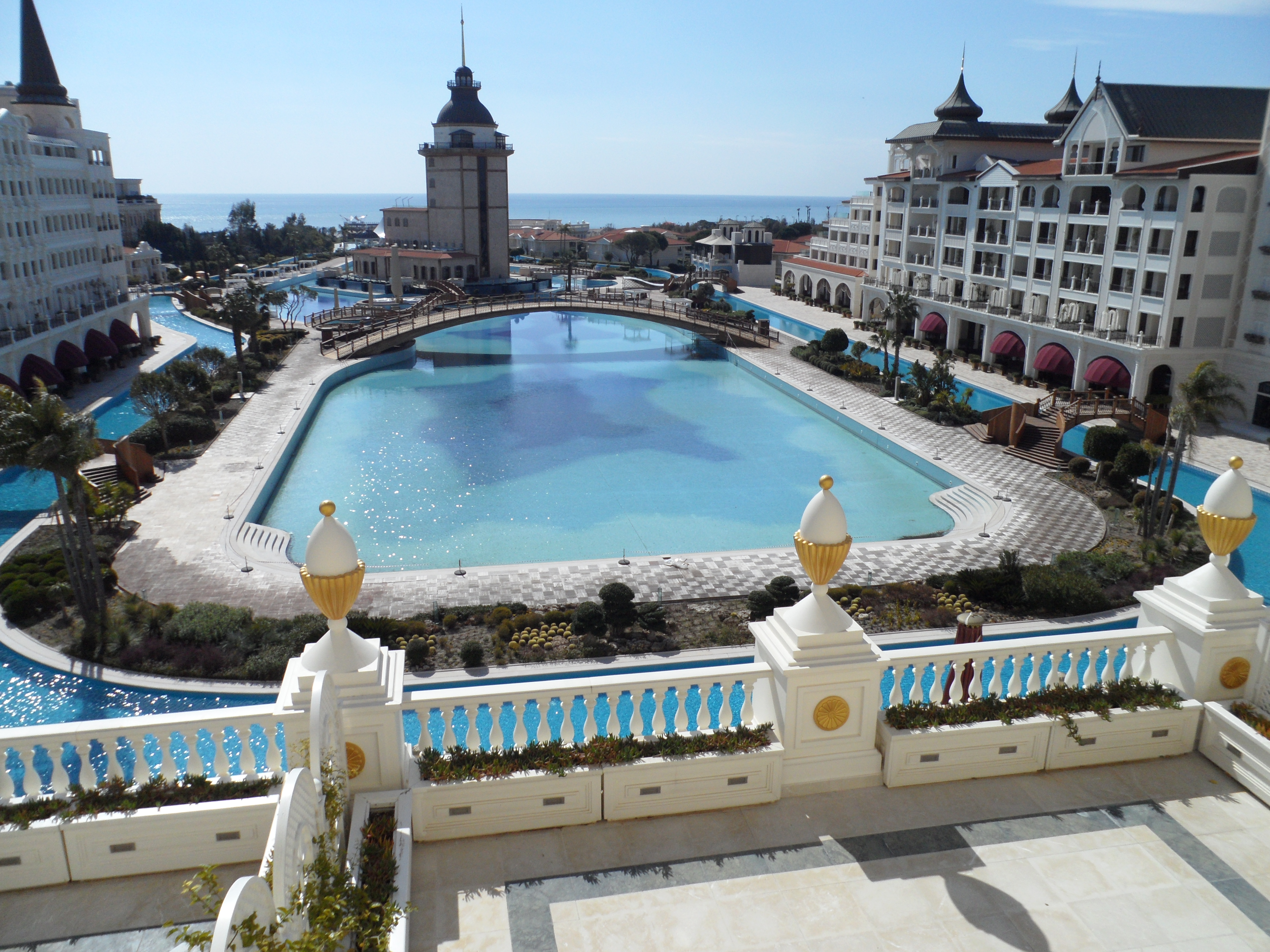

- Location within Turkey Mardan Palace (Europe)

General information
- Location: Lara, Antalya, Turkey
- Coordinates: 36°51′25.8″N 30°55′12.36″E
- Opening: 23 May 2009; 16 years ago
- Cost: $1.4 billion
- Owner: Telman Ismailov (2009-2015); Halkbank (2015- present)

Design and construction
- Architect: Hasan Sökmen

Other information
- Number of rooms: 560

Website
- mardanpalace.com

Mardan Palace is a luxury hotel in Lara, Antalya, Turkey, built by Azerbaijani businessman Telman Ismailov. It has been called Europe's and the Mediterranean's most expensive luxury resort. After the bankruptcy of owner Telman Ismailov (2015) the hotel was leased and being operated by Titanic Hotels and Resorts 2018-2026, later acquired by Swandor Hotels in early 2026.

== History ==
It was opened on 23 May 2009 and attended by Mariah Carey, Kendall Jenner, Sharon Stone, Richard Gere, Monica Bellucci, Paris Hilton, Seal, Tom Jones, and the Kazakhstani President Nursultan Nazarbayev. Some football clubs like Shakhtar Donetsk and Steaua Bucharest, 2011 and respectively 2012, were guests of honor. The teams held their training camps in Antalya at the invitation of Telman Ismailov, who supported all the costs. The corporate identity and website for the hotel was created by Brash Brands in Dubai, winning it an International Design Award. It is also known as Mardan Khan because of its luxury and according to Telman Ismailov at the time of its establishment. Its pool is one of the largest in Europe and its aquarium with more than 2,400 fish is one of the largest in Europe. In December 2018, it was announced that Titanic Hotels, whose properties include Beach Lara and Deluxe Belek, would take over the hotel. It is unconfirmed when the hotel will reopen.

== Cost ==
Mardan Palace's reported cost is $1.4 billion. It has the Mediterranean's largest swimming pool within which is a sunken aquarium containing 2,400 fish. The hotel has 560 rooms, a 12,000 sq ft (1,100 m^{2}) spa, and its own beach containing 9,000 tons of sand imported from Egypt. 10,000 m^{2} of gold, 500,000 crystals, 23,000 m^{2} of Italian marble were used in the construction of the hotel.

The hotel was sold to Halkbank for just $124 million in late 2015.

== Facilities ==
The hotel boasts a 5-acre pool and at the center of it is their seafood restaurant. The restaurant is surrounded by 4 aquariums that host over 3,000 varieties of fish.
