= Telman Ismailov =

Azerbaijani businessman (born 1956)

- Born: Telman Mardanovich Ismailov; 26 October 1956 (age 69); Baku, Azerbaijan SSR
- Other name: Key Relatives: Asher Danilov Yakov Yakubov God Nisanov Zorik Yusufov Zaur Yusufov Yusuf Yusufov Ari Yusufov Tamir Danilov Zaur Yusufov
- Occupations: Businessman and entrepreneur
- Known for: AST Group
- Children: Sarkhan and Alekper (sons)
- Website: AST Group Website

Notes
- Peak net worth: 2008 - $12 Billion

Telman Mardanovich Ismailov (Azerbaijani: Telman Mərdan oğlu İsmayılov, Russian: Те́льман Марда́нович Исмаи́лов; born 26 October 1956) is an Azerbaijani-born Russian businessman and entrepreneur of Mountain Jewish origin. Since Azerbaijan does not allow dual citizenship, he holds Russian-Turkish citizenship. He is the chairman of the Russian AST Group of companies, which is active in many countries. Until 2009, Ismailov owned the Europe's then-largest marketplace, Cherkizovsky Market, located in Moscow, Russia.

== Early life and family ==
Telman Ismailov was born in Baku, USSR in 1956, to a business family from Baku. He is the tenth of 12 children. Both his father's and mother's side were Mountain Jews.

== Business career ==
In 1989, he registered the brand "AST" (initials of his two sons (Alekper, Sarkhan) and himself). (Note: Telman Ismailov is a co-owner and founder of the 1989 established AST Group which is an abbreviation of the names Alekper-Sarkhan-Telman (Russian: «АСТ» (аббревиатура от имён Алекпе́р-Сарха́н-Те́льман)). Since 2002, the AST Group owns the "Moscow Printing House" (Russian: «Московский полиграфический дом»). As of 2009, The AST Group is engaged in hotel (AST-Gof), construction (AST-Kapstroy), printing services (AST-Moscow Printing House), transport (AST-TransService), restaurant (Prague-AST), security and jewelry (AST-Gold) business, its annual turnover is about 2 billion dollars. "AST" owns the Cherkizovsky and Varshavsky markets, the Moscow restaurants "Prague" and "Mayak", the store "Voentorg", the travel agency "AST-TOUR" as of June 2009.)

After the lavish opening of a hotel resort, the Mardan Palace, in Antalya, Russia's prime minister Vladimir Putin was reportedly enraged that Ismailov invested so much abroad and flaunted his riches while Russia was being hit by a credit crunch. In retaliation, the angry Putin ordered the closing of Cherkizovsky Market in August 2009, causing 100,000 traders at the famous bazaar to lose their jobs.

== Lifestyle ==
Known for his extravagant lifestyle, Ismailov is famous for spending millions of dollars on singers like Jennifer Lopez, Mariah Carey, Tom Jones, and others. Ismailov paid Lopez $1.4 million for her to sing 10 minutes' worth of songs. The video of her singing "Happy Birthday" song to him is available on YouTube. Ismailov befriended plenty of other celebrities such as Sharon Stone, Richard Gere, Monica Bellucci, Paris Hilton, and numerous other performers just to appear at his lavish parties.
