= Qaraxanlı, Tovuz =

Qaraxanlı
- Municipality
- Location within Azerbaijan
- Coordinates: 41°02′N 45°38′E
- Country: Azerbaijan
- District: Tovuz

Population
  - Total: 3,166
- Time zone: UTC+4 (AZT)
  - Summer (DST): UTC+5 (AZT)

Qaraxanlı (also, Garakhanly) is a village and municipality in the Tovuz District of Azerbaijan. It has a population of 3,166.
