= Cherkizovsky Market =

Formerly Europe's largest marketplace - in Moscow, Russia

Coordinates: 55°48′00″N 37°45′09″E

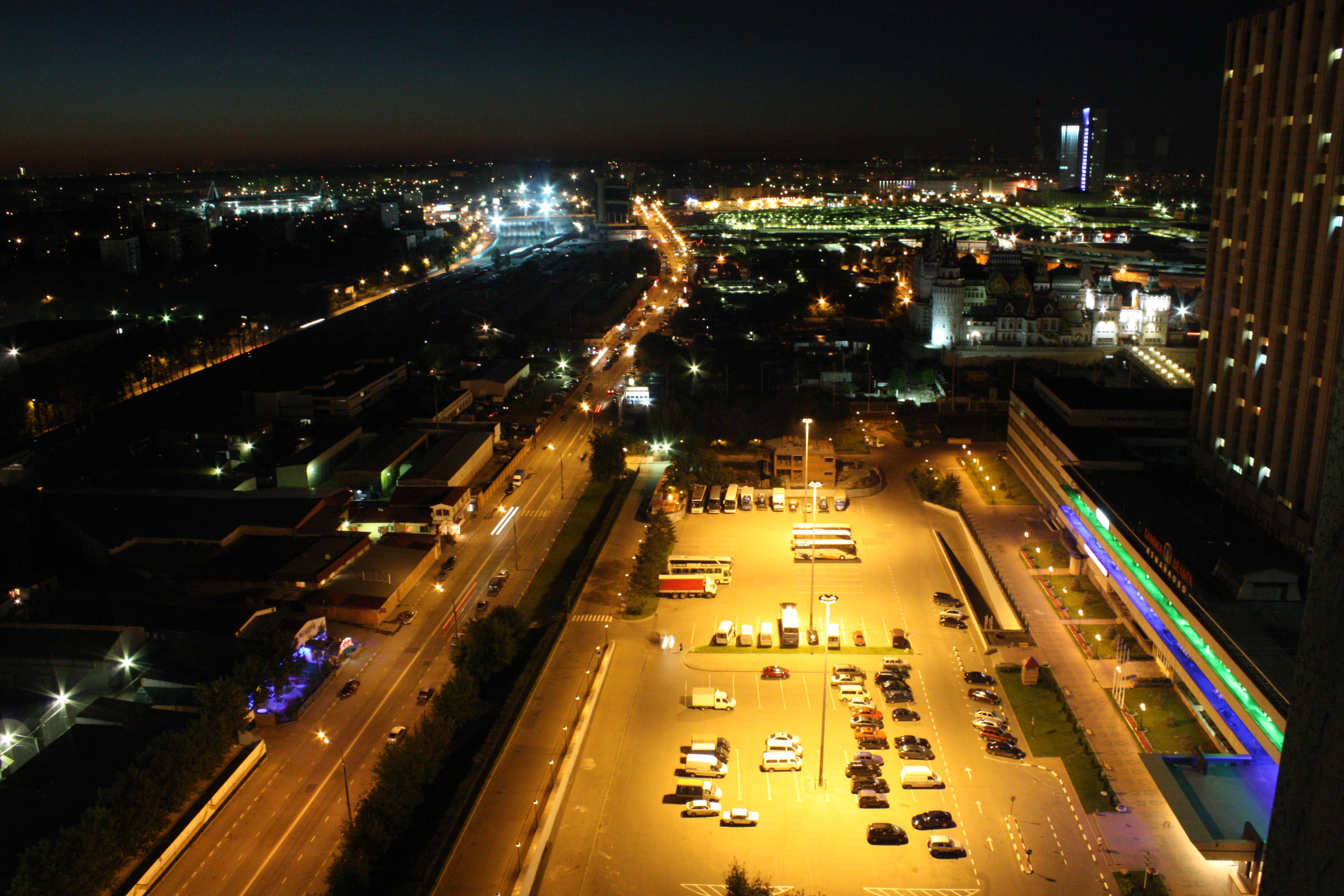
A nighttime view of Cherkizovsky Market from a hotel window

The Cherkizovsky Market (Russian: Черкизовский рынок), also known as Cherkizon (Russian: Черкизон) and Domed Market (Vietnamese: Chợ Vòm), was Europe's largest marketplace, located in Izmaylovo District, Moscow, Russia, near the Lokomotiv Stadium and Cherkizovskaya Moscow Metro station. Owned by Telman Ismailov's AST Group, in its heyday the market generated employment for an estimated 100,000 workers, mostly Vietnamese, Chinese and Central Asian immigrants. Moscow city authorities closed the market down on June 29, 2009 on grounds of numerous violations of regulations and illegal activities. In July 2009, Moscow authorities confirmed that a Chinatown would replace the market, though the project had never materialized.

== History ==
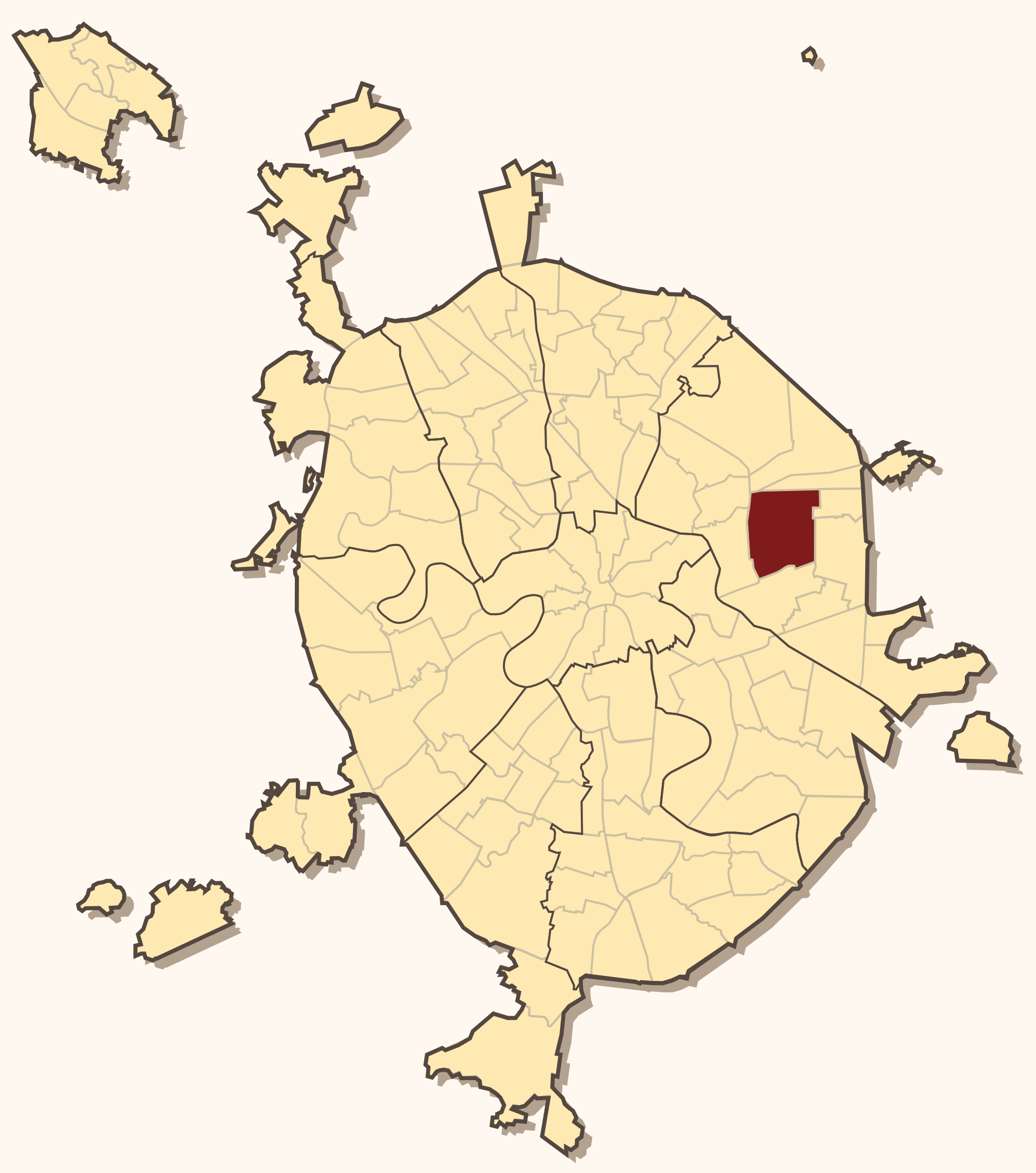
The green dot which represents the location of Cherkizovsky Market

The market was founded in the early 1990s. With an area around 300 hectares, it was the largest market in Russia, and one of the largest in Europe. Thousands of migrants from China, Vietnam and Central Asia worked and lived there, many without valid documents. However, Moscow city authorities, in an effort to curb the spread of counterfeit goods and protect Sino-Russian trade, declared their intention to shut down the market several times since 1999.

On August 21, 2006, a blast hit the marketplace, killing 14. The bombing was carried out by members of the radical nationalist group Spas. Eight group members were later found guilty of the attack along with some other bombings carried out by the Moscow city court in May 2008, and given prison sentences ranging from 2 years to life imprisonment.

=== Closure ===
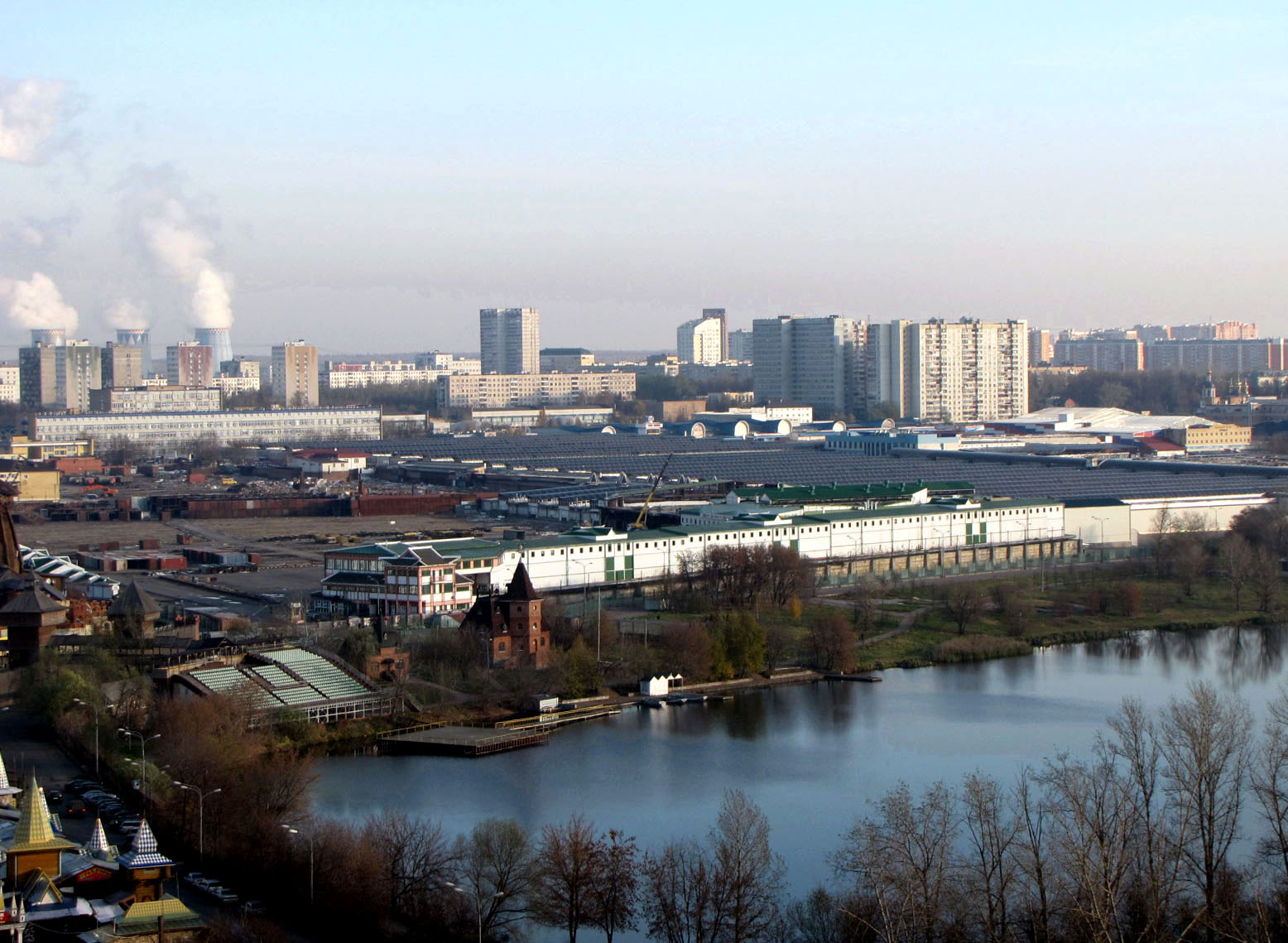
Cherkizovsky market, 2010

On June 1, 2009, Prime Minister Vladimir Putin complained at a government meeting that last year's large-scale confiscation of smuggled Chinese goods on the Cherkizovsky market hadn't resulted in convictions. According to The Independent, The Sunday Times and others, Putin was furious that Telman Ismailov in late May threw a lavish party in Turkey, celebrating the opening of an opulent resort hotel there, despite him having made his fortune in Russia.

On June 18, 2009, Russian authorities said they would destroy more than 6,000 containers holding an estimated $2 billion worth of pirated and smuggled goods which entered into Russia through the practice of gray customs clearance.

On June 25, Alexander Bastrykin, head of the Investigative Committee of the Prosecutor General's Office turned on the market, demanding its shutdown. State-run Rossiya TV channel aired a programme investigating the smuggling connected to the marketplace and attacking Ismailov. Moscow mayor Yuri Luzhkov, despite being a close friend of Ismailov, pledged to remove the market.

On June 29, The market was temporarily shut down by Russia's consumer watchdog Rospotrebnadzor after a series of checks revealed 464 violations of fire safety regulations. The complete list of violations included poor sanitary conditions, concerns over how goods were stored, and concerns over the living conditions of thousands of the market’s employees.

On July 15, Mayor Luzhkov made it clear that the closure was permanent, and the dismantling of the market began the following September.

=== Aftermath ===
Cherkizovsky market, 2008

The sudden shutdown of the market left tens of thousands of workers, many of them illegal immigrants, jobless and in financial trouble because they were unable to sell their goods. China was worried by the situation around the market and in late July sent a MOFCOM delegation headed by Chinese Vice Minister of Commerce Gao Hucheng to negotiate the fate of the Chinese vendors. Moscow's consumer department cooperated with the Chinese coordination group and agreed to allow Chinese merchants to clean up their stalls and ship out their merchandise from the closed market during a specific period of time every day.

Gao said China had no objections to Russia's crackdown on illegal trade, but that the Russian side should try its best to keep the economic losses of the Chinese business people to a minimum. Some Chinese analysts noted that Russia's cracking down on smuggling and rectifying its domestic markets would help regulate trade channels, improve trade environment, and therefore be overall beneficial to the sustained and sound development of bilateral trade between the two countries in the long run.

For Vietnamese merchants, most moved to other well-known marketplaces in Moscow, namely the Moskva trade fair center in Lyublino district, while others returned to their home country.

A poll conducted by the Levada Center showed that among the 94% of Moscow citizens who knew about the closure, 67% supported the move. An online poll conducted by the newspaper Izvestia also showed that over 80% of respondents were in favor of the shutdown.
