= Battle of Erpeli =

1823 Caucasian War battle

- Part of Caucasian War
Date	July 30, 1823
Location	Erpeli, present-day Buynaksky District, Dagestan, Russia
Result	Kumyk-Avar victory

Belligerents
Russian Empire	Kumyks: Erpeli clan; Karani clan; Avars: Koisu-Bulins

Commanders and leaders
(Russian Empire) Major General Karl Krabbe	Umalat-bek Buynaksky

Strength
Unknown	Unknown

Casualties and losses
Unknown, but more	Unknown

The Battle of Erpeli took place in 1823 in the village of Erpeli (present-day Buynaksky District in Dagestan, Russia) between Russian Imperial troops led by Major General Karl Krabbe and a coalition of rebellious Kumyks and Avars under the leadership of Umalat-bek Buynaksky.

== Background ==
The Russian Empire was steadily expanding its influence in Dagestan, aiming to establish strongholds in the Caspian region. To reinforce its authority, Russia constructed the Bournaya fortress near the capital of the Tarki Shamkhalate. By suppressing local feudal rulers, such as the destruction of the Mehtuli Khanate in 1819, Russian commander Aleksey Yermolov built a loyal network of regional elites. Yermolov claimed that "there are no longer resisting peoples in Dagestan." However, unrest grew among the uzdens (noble commoners) dissatisfied with both their feudal overlords and the Russian administration.

Tensions also grew due to rivalry among local noble houses. The Avar Khan Ahmed Khan, linked by blood to the Mehtuli khans, attempted to place Umalat-bek on the throne of the Shamkhalate, replacing the unpopular Mehti II. The situation escalated when Umalat-bek assassinated Colonel Verkhovsky, a senior Russian official in Dagestan. The unrest soon spread to Tarki, where locals killed a Russian overseer and two Cossacks, then attempted to storm the fortress with 3,000 men. In the Kumyk villages of Erpeli and Karani, the Russian official known for abuses was also killed. This led to a punitive expedition ordered by the Russian command under Maj. Gen. Krabbe.

== Battle ==
Krabbe led a detachment supported by the cavalry of Shamkhal Mehti II. The Kumyk villages sought reinforcements from the Koisu-Bulin Avars, known for their resistance to Russian control. On July 29, 1823, Krabbe captured and burned the village of Upper Karani. The main rebel force had gathered in Erpeli, located in forested terrain which limited Russian artillery effectiveness.

On July 30, Krabbe launched an assault on Erpeli. Despite early successes, including the capture of half the village, Russian troops faced fierce resistance. By evening, they were forced to retreat under heavy pressure from the mountaineers, pursued all the way to Temir-Khan-Shura (modern Buynaksk). Although Krabbe later claimed that the rebels had been annihilated and the villages destroyed, historian Nikolai Pokrovsky and military chronicler Vasily Potto both described the campaign as a major defeat for the Russian forces. British historian J. F. Baddeley also emphasized the failure.

== See also ==
- Caucasian War
- History of the Kumyks
- Russo-Kumyk wars

== Sources ==
- Pokrovsky, N. I. (2000). Kavkazskie voyny i imamat Shamilya [Caucasian Wars and the Imamate of Shamil] (in Russian). Moscow. p. 511.
- Baddeley, J. F. (2011). The Russian Conquest of the Caucasus. Cambridge University Press. p. 351.
- Dubrovin, N. F. Istoriya voyny i vladychestva russkikh na Kavkaze [History of the War and Russian Rule in the Caucasus] (in Russian). Vol. 6. p. 756.
- Akty, sobrannye Kavkazskoy arkheograficheskoy komissiyey [Acts Collected by the Caucasian Archaeographic Commission] (in Russian). Vol. 6, part 2. p. 950.
- Potto, V. A. Kavkazskaya voyna [The Caucasian War] (in Russian). Vol. 2. p. 324.
