= Manasaul =

Manasaul Манасаул
- Selo
- Location within Republic of Dagestan Location within Russia
- Coordinates: 42°45′N 47°02′E
- Country: Russia
- Region: Republic of Dagestan
- District: Buynaksky District
- Time zone: UTC+3:00

Manasaul (Russian: Манасаул) is a rural locality (a selo) and the administrative centre of Manasaulsky Selsoviet, Buynaksky District, Republic of Dagestan, Russia. The population was 629 as of 2010. There are 22 streets.

== Geography ==
Manasaul is located 13 km southwest of Buynaksk (the district's administrative centre) by road, on the left bank of the Akleozen River. Agachkala is the nearest rural locality.
