= Nizhneye Ishkarty =

Nizhneye Ishkarty Нижнее Ишкарты
- Selo
- Location within Republic of Dagestan Location within Russia
- Coordinates: 42°50′N 46°58′E
- Country: Russia
- Region: Republic of Dagestan
- District: Buynaksky District
- Time zone: UTC+3:00

Nizhneye Ishkarty (Russian: Нижнее Ишкарты) is a rural locality (a selo) and the administrative centre of Selsoviet, Ishkartinsky Selsoviet, Buynaksky District, Republic of Dagestan, Russia. The population was 998 as of 2010. There are 22 streets.

== Geography ==
Nizhneye Ishkarty is located 15 km northwest of Buynaksk (the district's administrative centre) by road. Verkhneye Ishkarty is the nearest rural locality.
