= Durangi =

Durangi Дуранги
- Selo
- Location within Republic of Dagestan Location within Russia
- Coordinates: 42°38′N 47°13′E
- Country: Russia
- Region: Republic of Dagestan
- District: Buynaksky District
- Time zone: UTC+3:00

Durangi (Russian: Дуранги) is a rural locality (a selo) in Buynaksky District, Republic of Dagestan, Russia. The population was 550 as of 2010. There are 14 streets.

== Geography ==
Durangi is located 28 km southeast of Buynaksk (the district's administrative centre) by road, on the left bank of the Markisal River. Chabanmakhi and Arykhkent is the nearest rural locality.
