= Vanashimakhi =

Vanashimakhi Ванашимахи Ванашимахьи
- Selo
- Location within Republic of Dagestan Location within Russia
- Coordinates: 42°38′N 47°16′E
- Country: Russia
- Region: Republic of Dagestan
- District: Buynaksky District
- Time zone: UTC+3:00

Vanashimakhi (Russian: Ванашимахи; Avar: Ванашимахьи) is a rural locality (a selo) in Karamakhinsky Selsoviet, Buynaksky District, Republic of Dagestan, Russia. The population was 281 as of 2010. There are 4 streets.

== Geography ==
Vanashimakhi is located 36 km southeast of Buynaksk (the district's administrative centre) by road. Chabanmakhi is the nearest rural locality.
