= Atlanaul =

Atlanaul Атланаул Атлан-авул
- Selo
- Location within Republic of Dagestan Location within Russia
- Coordinates: 42°48′N 47°09′E
- Country: Russia
- Region: Republic of Dagestan
- District: Buynaksky District
- Time zone: UTC+3:00

Atlanaul (Russian: Атланаул; Kumyk: Атлан-авул, Atlan-avul) is a rural locality (a selo) in Buynaksky District, Republic of Dagestan, Russia. The population was 2,375 as of 2010. There are 58 streets.

== Geography ==
Atlanaul is located 4 km southeast of Buynaksk (the district's administrative centre) by road. Buynaksk is the nearest rural locality.
