= Verkhny Karanay =

Verkhny Karanay Верхний Каранай Тӏасияб Гъарани
- Selo
- Location within Republic of Dagestan Location within Russia
- Coordinates: 42°49′N 46°54′E
- Country: Russia
- Region: Republic of Dagestan
- District: Buynaksky District
- Time zone: UTC+3:00

Verkhny Karanay (Russian: Верхний Каранай; Avar: Тӏасияб Гъарани) is a rural locality (a selo) and the administrative centre of Verkhnekaranayevsky Selsoviet, Buynaksky District, Republic of Dagestan, Russia. The population was 735 as of 2010. There are 26 streets.

== Geography ==
Verkhny Karanay is located 23 km west of Buynaksk (the district's administrative centre) by road. Nizhny Karanay is the nearest rural locality.
