= History of the Jews in Buynaksk =

Buynaksk Jews
יהודים בוינאקסק Буйнакские евреи
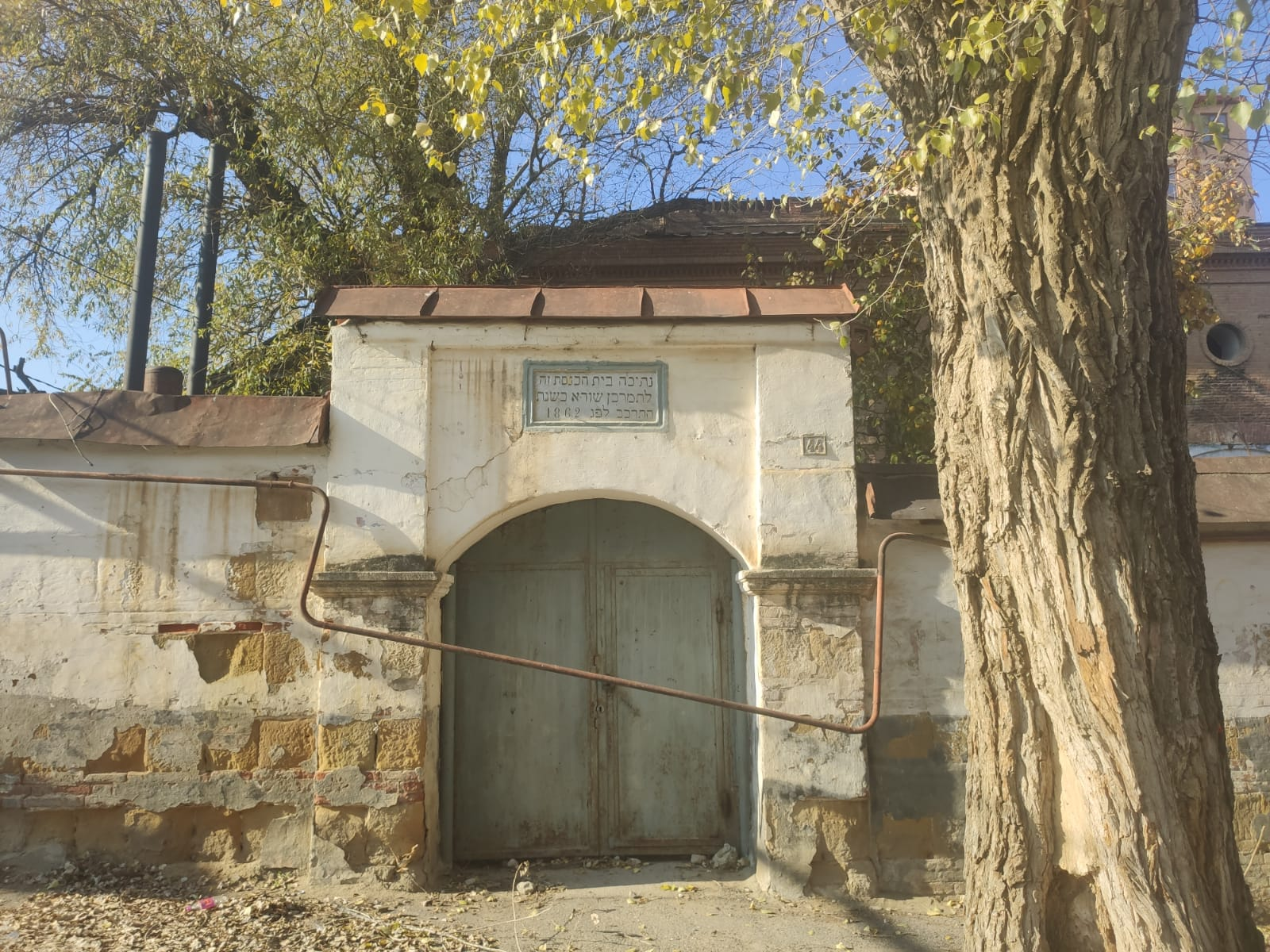
- Main entrance of the Buynaksk Synagogue, 2024

Total population
- 5–10

Languages
- Hebrew (in Israel), Judeo-Tat, Russian

Religion
- Judaism

Related ethnic groups
- Mountain Jews, Ashkenazi Jews.

The Jewish community in Buynaksk, in the Republic of Dagestan, is one of the oldest in the North Caucasus. After Dagestan was annexed to the Russian Empire, many fortresses were built, around which cities later grew. One of them was Temir-Khan-Shurá, which was renamed Buynaksk in 1922. By 1850, in addition to military personnel, Russian and Armenian traders and several families of Mountain Jewish artisans already lived there. Until the February Revolution of 1917, Mountain Jews and Ashkenazi Jews together constituted most of the city’s population. Under the Soviet Union and in post-Soviet Russia, the Jewish community in Buynaksk primarily consists of Mountain Jews.

== History ==
=== 19th century ===
During the Caucasian War, a significant number of Jews living in the highlands were killed by Imam Shamil’s companions. Those who agreed to accept Islam and join the gazavat that Shamil waged against the Russian Empire survived, as did those who, through the efforts of Jewish leaders, were evacuated to the Chir-Yurt fortress under the protection of Russian troops and survived the assault undertaken by the highlanders. After the danger had passed, a small group of Jews moved from Chir-Yurt to the Temir-Khan-Shurá fortress. Ashkenazi Jews who had served their terms in the Russian Empire’s army were also allowed to settle in Temir-Khan-Shurá. Mountain Jews and Ashkenazi Jews lived in the fortress in two different quarters, each of which had its own synagogue. After the end of the Caucasian War, the Mountain Jews of Temir-Khan-Shurá received permission to build a synagogue. The Ashkenazi synagogue, built in 1862, still survives.

The majority of the Jews in Temir-Khan-Shurá were Ashkenazi Jews, most of whom were members of the city’s merchant guild and were engaged in supplying the Russian army.

- In the mid-19th century, the Mountain Jewish community was led by Sholem-Melech Mizrachi.
- In 1858, Temir-Khan-Shurá had 200 residents, 89 of whom were Mountain Jews.
- In 1866, the Russian Empire traveler-ethnographer Judah Chorny (1835-1880), known for his study of the Jews of the Caucasus, identified the local Jewish population as consisting of 290 Jews (of which 170 were Mountain Jews) living in 35 houses.

In the same year, 1866, there were two synagogues in the city - Mountain and Ashkenazi.

- In the 1860s, the rabbi was Mordechai-Leib Rassentsov.
- In 1873, 406 Jews lived in the city.
- Since 1875, the rabbi of the Mountain Jews was Hezekiah Mushailov.
- In 1886, the ethnographer Ilya Anisimov (1862-1928) registered 64 Jewish houses in the city, in which there were 164 men and 170 women.

According to the 1897 census, there were about 100,000 residents in the Temir-Khan-Shurá district, including 2,795 Jews. The city itself had more than nine thousand residents, including 1,199 Jews (13% of the city's population).

- In the 1890s, the Ashkenazi rabbi was Toviy Naumovich Gorodetsky.
- Since 1891, there has been an official synagogue.
- In 1899, 1,950 Jews lived in the city.
- At the end of the 19th century, there were 9,089 residents in the city, of whom 1,950 were Jews.

=== 20th century ===
- At the beginning of the 20th century, 1,800 Jews lived in the city, making up 28% of the city’s population.
- In 1910, 1,317 Jews lived in the city. That same year, in addition to two synagogues, the city also had a Jewish cemetery and a Jewish primary public school.

The majority of the city's Mountain Jews were engaged in trade.

- In 1912, there were 1,930 Jews in Temir-Khan-Shurá, of which 1,200 were Mountain Jews.
- In 1915, there were 3 synagogues in the Temir-Khan-Shurá District (excluding Temir-Khan-Shurá).
- During the Civil War, 150 Jewish families moved to the city.
- In 1926, 1,471 Jews lived in the city, making up 15.5% of the city’s population, including 980 Mountain Jews.
- In 1932, the Mountain-Jewish collective farm (Russian: Новый быт) - "New Life" was created in the Buynaksk District with 170 people.
- In 1939, only 196 Jews lived in the city.

During the Great Patriotic War, the number of Ashkenazi Jews in Buynaksk increased due to evacuees.

- In 1945, the synagogue resumed its work, and up to 120 Jews would gather for holiday services.
- Until 1951, the city's rabbi was Meir Khanukaevich Rafailov.

On August 9, 1960, the Buynaksk newspaper Communist (Russian: Коммунист) published an article titled (kum: "Аллаха да ел еркин") - "Even without God, the road is open" by Daaya Marmudov, a deputy of one of the local village councils, which contained a blood libel against the Jews, claiming they drank Muslim blood:

Jews, according to their religion, believe that drinking Muslim blood once a year was beneficial. Some Jews accordingly purchased from 5 to 10 grams of Muslim blood, which they mixed with water in a large barrel and sold as water that had been in contact with the blood of a Muslim.

This slander caused protests in Western Europe and from the Mountain Jews of Dagestan. The Soviets had to issue a refutation, strip D. Marmudov of his parliamentary powers, and fire the editor-in-chief of Communist.

The Jewish community had a Hebrew school, a library, and a youth club. The community also provided humanitarian aid, including the distribution of matzah for the holiday of Passover.

- In the 1980s, there was a synagogue in the city, whose rabbi also served as a shochet. A minyan was held regularly, and there was a Jewish cemetery.
- In the early 1990s, a Jewish school was opened, and the religious community of Buynaksk was headed by Daniil Kazakov.
- In the early 1990s, the Jewish religious community of Buynaksk was headed by Naftali Naftaliev.

=== 21st century ===
The Buynaksk synagogue is in a state of disrepair, which is why it is not used.

- In 2012, about 20 Mountain and Ashkenazi Jewish families lived in Buynaksk.

There were cases of anti-Semitism in Buynaksk.

The Mountain Jews call this city "Shuro".

The Buynaksk District Rabbi is Chaim Friedman.

The chairman of the Buynaksk community is Rafik Borisovich Pashayev.

- In 2019, the Buynaksk Museum of Local History opened exhibition-research "The History of the Jewish Community of Buynaksk in Faces".
- In 2021, the Buynaksk City Court in Dagestan sentenced local resident Artur Abdullaev to 10 years in a special regime penal colony on charges of murdering the chairman of the city’s Jewish community.

According to the results of the All-Russian Population Census of 2020, there are currently a small number of Jews left in Buynaksk. Some of them moved to other regions of Russia, while many immigrated to Israel and other countries.

== Notable Jews of Buynaksk ==
- Arnold Aleksandrovich Shalmuyev (b. 1968) - Russian statesman, vice-governor of the Novgorod region, first deputy head of the Novgorod region, candidate of economic sciences.
- Israel Borisovich Razgon (1892-1937) - Soviet military leader

== See also ==
- Buynaksk Synagogue
- Judaism in Dagestan
- Judeo-Tat
- Judeo-Tat literature
- Judeo-Tat theatre
- Mountain Jews
- Buynaksk Affair
