= Kafyr-Kumukh =

Kafyr-Kumukh Кафыр-Кумух Кафыр-Къумукъ
- Selo
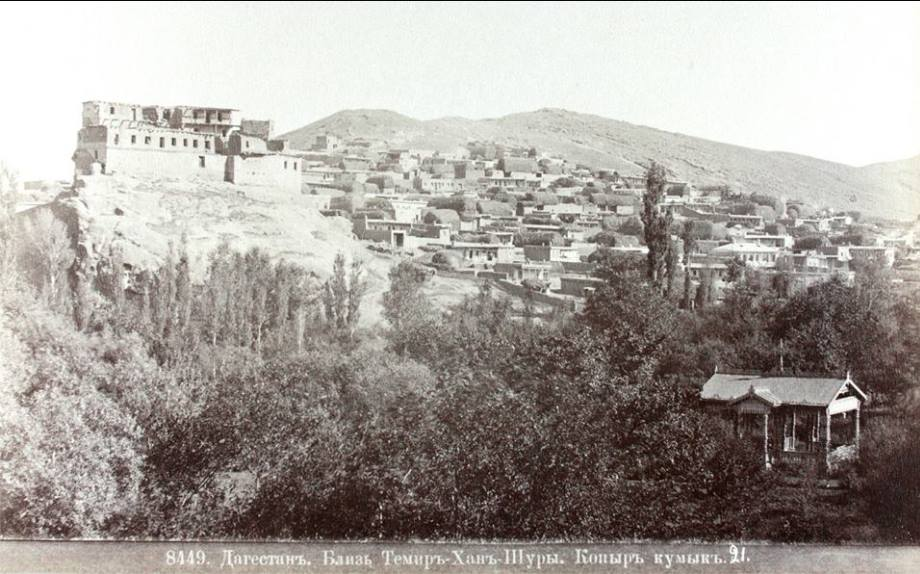
- The palace of the Shamkhal of Tarki

- Location within Republic of Dagestan Location within Russia
- Coordinates: 42°50′N 47°09′E
- Country: Russia
- Region: Republic of Dagestan
- District: Buynaksky District
- Time zone: UTC+3:00

Kafyr-Kumukh (Russian: Кафыр-Кумух; Kumyk: Кафыр-Къумукъ, Kafır-Qumuq) is a rural locality (a selo) in Buynaksky District, Republic of Dagestan, Russia. The population was 5,107 as of 2010. There are 47 streets.

== Geography ==
Kafyr-Kumukh is located 3 km northeast of Buynaksk (the district's administrative centre) by road, on the right bank of the Shuraozen. Khalimbekaul is the nearest rural locality.
