= Verkhny Dzhengutay =

Verkhny Dzhengutay Верхний Дженгутай
- Selo
- Location within Republic of Dagestan Location within Russia
- Coordinates: 42°40′N 47°14′E
- Country: Russia
- Region: Republic of Dagestan
- District: Buynaksky District
- Time zone: UTC+3:00

Verkhny Dzhengutay (Russian: Верхний Дженгутай) is a rural locality (a selo) in Buynaksky District, Republic of Dagestan, Russia. The population was 2,144 as of 2010. There are 36 streets.

== Geography ==
Verkhny Dzhengutay is located 23 km southeast of Buynaksk (the district's administrative centre) by road, on the left bank of the Arkaslyor River. Dorgeli is the nearest rural locality.
