= Ekibulak =

Ekibulak Экибулак
- Selo
- Location within Republic of Dagestan Location within Russia
- Coordinates: 43°02′N 47°04′E
- Country: Russia
- Region: Republic of Dagestan
- District: Buynaksky District
- Time zone: UTC+3:00

Ekibulak (Russian: Экибулак) is a rural locality (a selo) in Erpelinsky Selsoviet, Buynaksky District, Republic of Dagestan, Russia. The population was 114 as of 2010.

== Geography ==
Ekibulak is located 33 km north of Buynaksk (the district's administrative centre) by road. Novaya Urada and Uchkent are the nearest rural localities.
