= Yangikent, Republic of Dagestan =

Yangikent Янгикент Янгыгент Йагъиккент Нуьгеди
- Village
- Location within Republic of Dagestan Location within Russia
- Coordinates: 42°12′N 47°49′E
- Country: Russia
- Region: Republic of Dagestan
- District: Kaytagsky District

Population (2021)
  - Total: 1,154 people
- Time zone: UTC+3:00

Yangikent (Russian: Янгикент; Kumyk: Янгыгент, Yañıgent; Kaitag: Йагъиккент, Judeo-Tat: Нуьгеди) is a rural locality (a selo) and the administrative center of Yangikentsky Selsoviet, Kaytagsky District, Republic of Dagestan, Russia. There are 23 streets.

== Geography ==
Yangikent is located 12 km north of Madzhalis (the district's administrative center) by road, on the Yangichay River. Chumli and Gulli are the nearest rural localities.

== History ==
=== Establishment of the village ===
The village of Yangikent was burned three times: in 1277, 1818 and 1877, and was restored the same number of times to be called Yangikent each time. Most of the residents are Karapapakhs people by origin. Many of the inhabitants of the first village were Mountain Jews and Muslims, descended from the (Russian: чагар) - Chagar settled by the (Russian: Уцмий) - Utsmi. According to legend, after the founding of Madzhalis (late 16th century), Mountain Jews from (Russian: Дерей Гъэте) - Derey Gaete gradually moved to a new village. Later, some of them moved to the village of Yangikent, which Mountain Jews call Nyugedi (Nuge-dig “New Village”, a translation from the Kumyk name). Initially, the village served as a country residence for the feudal lords of the Utsmi house living in Bashlykent.

The Mountain Jews of the village of Nyugedi were engaged in trade and were tanners.

== Population ==
According to family lists of 1843, 125 Mountain Jews lived in the village at that time, of which 66 were men and 59 women. In total there were 45 houses.

In 1866, the famous traveler Judah Chorny registered in Yangikent 100 houses of the Mountain Jews. In the same year, Ilya Anisimov submitted information that in the village were 103 houses of the Mountain Jews, consisting of 360 men and 324 women.

Before the start of the World War I, 684 Jews lived in the village.

In 2010, in Yangikent lived 1,248 people. In 2021, the total population was 1,154.

== Nationalities ==
Kumyks and Dargins live there.
