= Takalay =

Takalay Такалай
- Selo
- Location within Republic of Dagestan Location within Russia
- Coordinates: 42°53′N 47°10′E
- Country: Russia
- Region: Republic of Dagestan
- District: Buynaksky District
- Time zone: UTC+3:00

Takalay (Russian: Такалай) is a rural locality (a selo) in Khalimbekaulsky Selsoviet, Buynaksky District, Republic of Dagestan, Russia. The population was 415 as of 2010. There are 2 streets.

== Geography ==
Takalay is located 11 km southeast of Buynaksk (the district's administrative centre) by road, on the Shuraozen River. Khalimbekaul and Kafyr-Kumukh are the nearest rural localities.
