= Jewish Quarter of Grozny =

Jewish quarter of Grozny
הרובע היהודי של גרוזני Еврейский квартал в Грозном
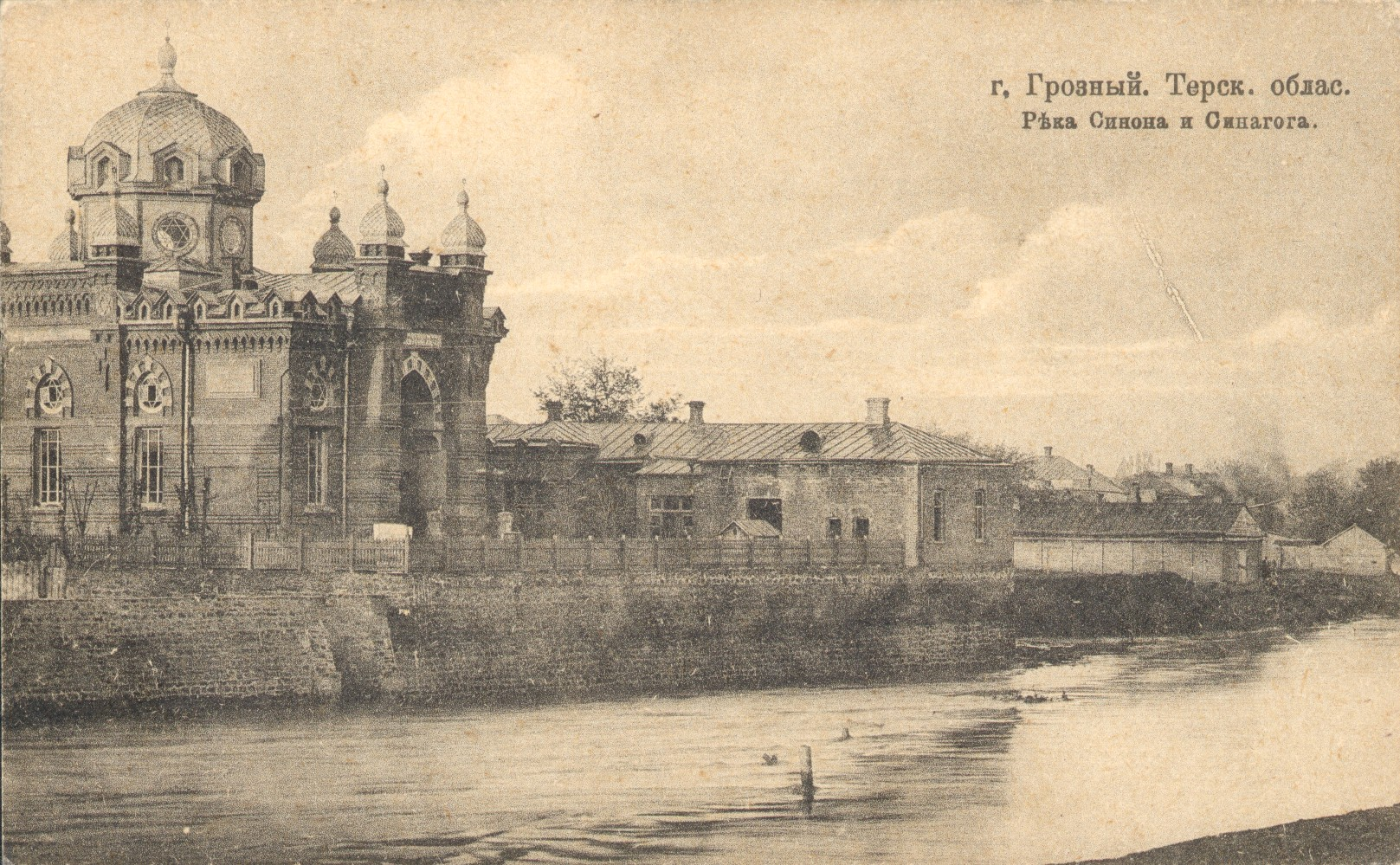
- Grozny synagogue, 1910

Total population
- 0

Languages
- Hebrew (in Israel), Judeo-Tat, Russian

Religion
- Judaism

Related ethnic groups
- Mountain Jews, Ashkenazi Jews

The Jewish Quarter of Grozny was located in the central part of the city of Grozny, Chechnya, Russia, and was mainly inhabited by Jews. It once had a thriving Jewish community and multiple synagogues, but the community was largely displaced during the first and second Chechen wars.

== Geography ==
The area where Jews lived was in the northern part of central Grozny, on the right bank of the Sunzha River, within the Akhmatovsky district. The main streets of the district are Moskovskaya and Viktor Kan-Kalika, formerly known as Subbotniks.

== History ==
The "Jewish quarter" was a district where the Jewish community traditionally lived, one of the old quarters of Grozny. The first Mountain Jewish community moved to the area of the Grozny fortress in the second half of the 19th century from the trading village of Endirey in Dagestan. In the pre-Soviet era, the Jewish quarter was called the Jewish suburb.

The quarter was also known as the Red Jewish settlement because the roofs of the houses in this district were traditionally covered with red tiles, in contrast to the Cossack houses, which were covered with straw.

In 1869, Grozny was granted city status, which led to an influx of new settlers into the district.

- In 1866, 928 Jews lived in Grozny.
- In 1869, there were 995 Jews.
- In 1874, there were 1,260 Mountain Jews, with a total city population of 8,450 people.
- In 1874, there were 1,259 Jews, making up 14.9% of the total city population.
- In 1890, there were 1,594 Jews.
- In 1897, there were 1,711 Jews, comprising 10.9% of the total city population.
- In 1900, there were 2,310 Jews, making up 14% of the total city population.
- In 1910, there were 2,474 Jews, comprising 9.5% of the total city population.
- In 1926, there were 2,787 Jews, making up 2.9% of the total city population, including 1,475 Mountain Jews.
- In 1939, there were 3,992 Jews.
- In 1970, there were 4,791 Jews, including 202 Mountain Jews, 13 Krymchaks, and 2 Karaites.
- In 1979, there were 3,758 Jews, comprising 1% of the total population of the city.

The main occupations of the community's residents were arable farming, gardening, cattle breeding, crafts, trade and leather tanning. In 1866, they owned 155 huts, 4 gardens and vineyards, and 27 shops. The district consisted of several quarters. Later, the Belikovsky Bridge was built, connecting the settlement with the central part of the city, which influenced the economic development of the area.

Nikolai Kharuzin (1865-1900), Russian ethnographer, wrote about the life of Jews in Grozny in his article, Across the Mountains of the North Caucasus. Travel Essays. Vestnik Evropy, No. 10. 1888:

What do you see when entering Grozny? You pass a bridge: on the bridge stands a group of Mountain Jews who moved to Grozny from the mountains; even though the Mountain Jews left Palestine from time immemorial (long before the birth of Christ), they have retained the typical features of their compatriots living in Poland and Russia; a dark yellow complexion and sad black eyes. Having lived many centuries in the mountains, the Jews have not lost the commercial spirit inherent in their compatriots, and now they control the trade of Grozny and Nalchik. Some of the Jews wear European costume, others - cherkeskas. But life in the mountains has nevertheless left its mark on them: many of them are excellent horsemen and fearless horsemen.

In 1893, large oil deposits were discovered in Grozny, leading to the rapid development of the city. Ashkenazi Jews from central Russia began to arrive in Grozny. The first prayer house was built in 1875, and in 1902 it was replaced by a large domed synagogue, built of brick, located between the Persian mosque and the Mitnikov bathhouse. As of 1883, Grozny had two synagogues. The Ashkenazi synagogue was built in 1863, and the one for Mountain Jews in 1865. Around 1928, by decision of the Soviet government, the synagogue was closed during the period of religious persecution. Later, the synagogue building was occupied by a music school.

The diaspora had its own separate quarter, which was destroyed during the Russian Civil War (1917–1922). Nevertheless, at this time, the Jewish quarter of Grozny was expanding, and Jewish refugees from neighboring villages were flocking to the city. On the left side of the block was Kirov Park and the Baronovsky District, populated mainly by the Armenian diaspora, and on the right side of the block was an old tram line that ran through the entire block.

Some facts from the life of the Jews of Grozny:

- Since 1847, the rabbi of Grozny was Moshe Tsarnees.
- In the 1860s, one of the rabbis was Shaul Binamini.
- From 1875, the rabbi was Israel ben Asher.
- In 1900, 13 children were learning the Talmud and Torah. Local Zionists were collecting money to establish a library.
- In 1900, Matatyagu Bogatyrev from Grozny participated in the 4th World Zionist Congress in London.
- In the early 1900s, the Poalei Zion organization operated in Grozny.
- In 1906, a Mountain Jewish school with instruction in Russian was founded in Grozny. The first director of the school was Akim Ishayatovich Isakovich, an active participant in the Zionist movement in Grozny.
- In 1909, 64 families from Grozny moved to Mandatory Palestine and founded a community of Mountain Jews in Jerusalem. At the end of the 19th and beginning of the 20th century, there was a Karaite community in Grozny that practiced Karaite Judaism.
- In March 1917, a group of Grozny Jews led by Ilya Anisimov appealed to the Jews of the Caucasus to hold a congress in support of the Russian Provisional Government.
- In 1925, the director of the Jewish school, writer Zakoy Yukhanovich Khudainatov (1889-1939), initiated the Latinization of the Judeo-Tat language.
- In the second half of the 1920s, a club for Mountain Jews operated in the building of the former synagogue.
- In 1963, the synagogue was closed in Grozny.

On Subbotniks Street (formerly Belikovskaya) was the educational institution School No. 22. In the late 1980s, the population of the district was about 4,000 people. With the beginning of the first and second wars in Chechnya, almost the entire Jewish population left Grozny, emigrating to Israel and to cities in Russia, primarily to those in the North Caucasus not affected by the war, such as Mozdok, Vladikavkaz, Pyatigorsk, and Stavropol.

== See also ==
- Grozny synagogue
- Judeo-Tat
- Judeo-Tat literature
- Judeo-Tat Theatre
- Mountain Jews

== Literature ==
- Satsita Israilova. Stories told by the temple: temples in the territory of Grozny // Archival Bulletin. - 2017. No. 5. ISSN: 978-5-6040381-2-3.
- Judah Chorny. Mountain Jews // Collection of information about the Caucasian highlanders. Issue III. Tiflis, 1870.
- Ilya Anisimov. "Caucasian Mountain Jews", 1888.
- Kazakov A. I., "The City of Grozny". Popular essays and histories of Checheno-Ingushetia. Publ. 1984.
- Elizarov Mikhail (Moisey) Shavadovich. Community of * Mountain Jews of Chechnya. Israel: Mirvori, 2012. p. 232.
- Havan D. M, Cherny I. Ya. From the cultural past of the Caucasian Jews. Jews in Chechnya. Grozny: Publ. Book, 1992. p. 48.
