= Grozny Synagogue =

Former place of worship in the Chechen capital

- Russian: Ашкеназская синагога
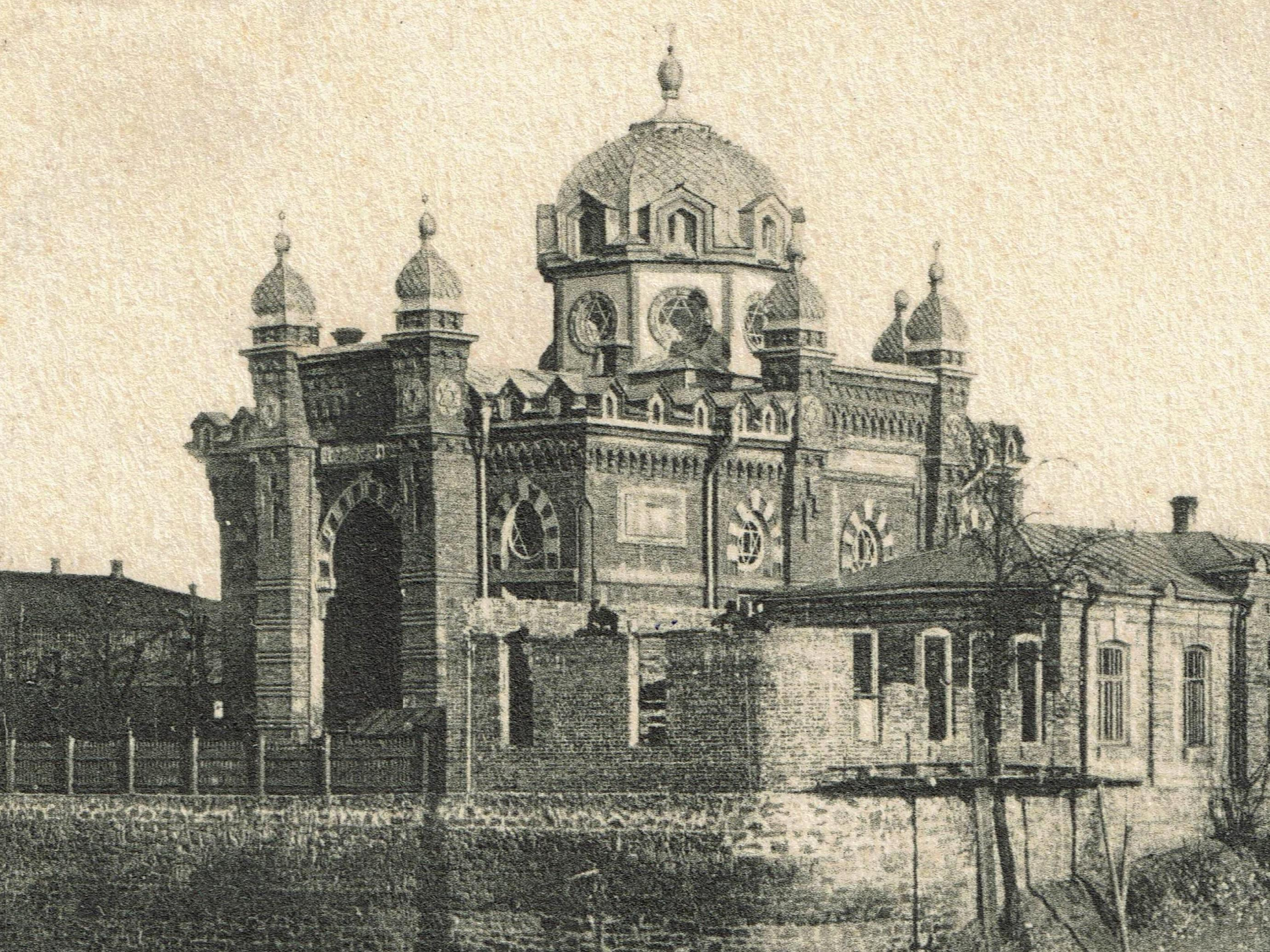
- The synagogue in 1910, prior to its destruction

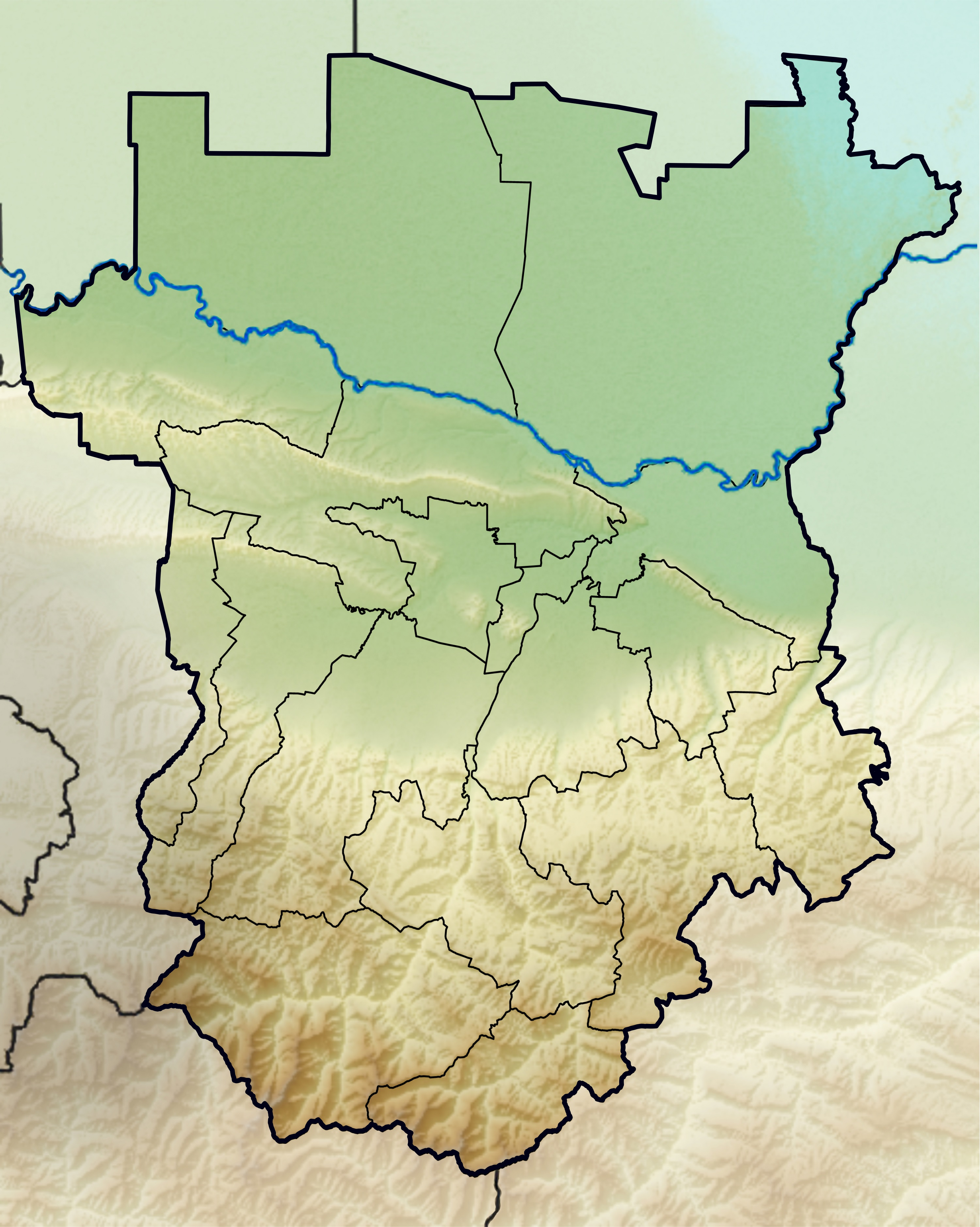
- Location of the destroyed synagogue in Chechnya

Religion
- Affiliation: Orthodox Judaism (former)
- Ecclesiastical or organizational status: Synagogue
- Status: Destroyed

Location
- Location: Grozny, Chechnya, North Caucasus
- Country: Russia
- Interactive map of Grozny Synagogue
- Coordinates: 43°18′54″N 45°41′38″E

Architecture
- Type: Synagogue architecture
- Funded by: The congregation of Ashkenazi Jews
- Groundbreaking: 1900
- Completed: 1902; rebuilt in 1930s
- Materials: brick blocks

The Grozny Synagogue (Russian: Ашкеназская синагога; Hebrew: בית הכנסת בגרוזני) was an Ashkenazi Orthodox Jewish synagogue located in the city of Grozny in the Chechen Republic, North Caucasus, Russia. In 1929, the synagogue was closed, later rebuilt, and repurposed for secular uses.

== History ==
In the mid-19th century, a settlement of Mountain Jews, likely migrated from Dagestan, appeared in Grozny on the right bank of the Sunzha River. By 1866, 453 men and 475 women of Jewish origin lived there. In 1863, an Ashkenazi synagogue was built, and in 1865, a synagogue for Mountain Jews. In 1875, a prayer house was built in the settlement, almost on the riverbank. In 1900, a flood destroyed the prayer house. That same year, construction of a synagogue began on the same site, which was completed two years later, in 1902. It was replaced by a large domed synagogue, built of brick, located between the Persian mosque and the Mitnikov bathhouse. As of 1883, there were two synagogues in Grozny.

In the early 1930s, during the period of religious persecution, the Soviet government closed the synagogue. The building was then rebuilt, adding a second floor. In 1937, a music school was opened in this building. The dome of the building was subsequently demolished.

In 1963, the synagogue in Grozny was closed.

From the 1970s to the 1990s, a music college occupied the synagogue. The building was destroyed during the First Chechen War.

Names of the rabbis of the Grozny synagogues:

- Since 1847, the rabbi of Grozny was Moshe Tsarnees.
- In the 1860s, one of the rabbis was Shaul Binamini.
- Since 1875, the rabbi was Israel ben Asher.

== See also ==
- Jewish Quarter of Grozny
- History of the Jews in Russia
- List of synagogues in Russia

== Literature ==
- Satsita Israilova. Stories told by the temple: temples in the territory of Grozny // Archival Bulletin. - 2017. No. 5. ISSN: 978-5-6040381-2-3.
- Judah Chorny. Mountain Jews // Collection of information about the Caucasian highlanders. Issue III. Tiflis, 1870.
- Ilya Anisimov. "Caucasian Mountain Jews", 1888.
- Kazakov A. I., "The City of Grozny". Popular essays and histories of Checheno-Ingushetia. Publ. 1984.
- Elizarov Mikhail (Moisey) Shavadovich. Community of * Mountain Jews of Chechnya. Israel: Mirvori, 2012. p. 232.
- Havan D. M, Cherny I. Ya. From the cultural past of the Caucasian Jews. Jews in Chechnya. Grozny: Publ. Book, 1992. p. 48.
