= Gergentala =

Gergentala Гергентала
- Selo
- Location within Republic of Dagestan Location within Russia
- Coordinates: 42°43′N 47°03′E
- Country: Russia
- Region: Republic of Dagestan
- District: Buynaksky District
- Time zone: UTC+3:00

Gergentala (Russian: Гергентала) is a rural locality (a selo) in Manasaulsky Selsoviet, Buynaksky District, Republic of Dagestan, Russia. The population was 27 as of 2010.

== Geography ==
Gergentala is located 14 km southwest of Buynaksk (the district's administrative centre) by road. Manasaul is the nearest rural locality.
