= Buynaksk Synagogue =

Abandoned synagogue in the city of Buynaksk, Russia

- Russian: Буйнакская синагога
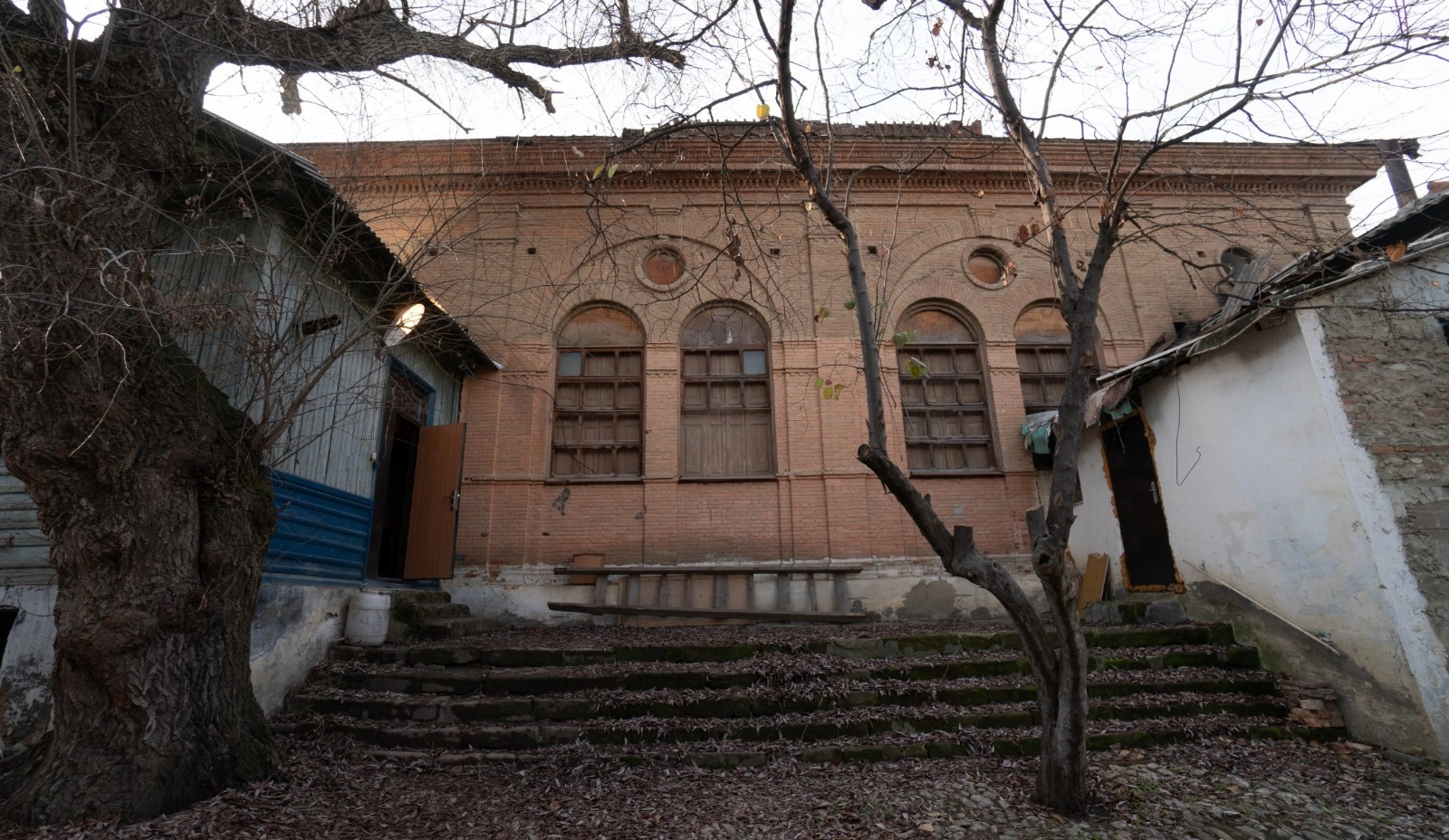
- The facade of the Buynaksk Synagogue. 2022

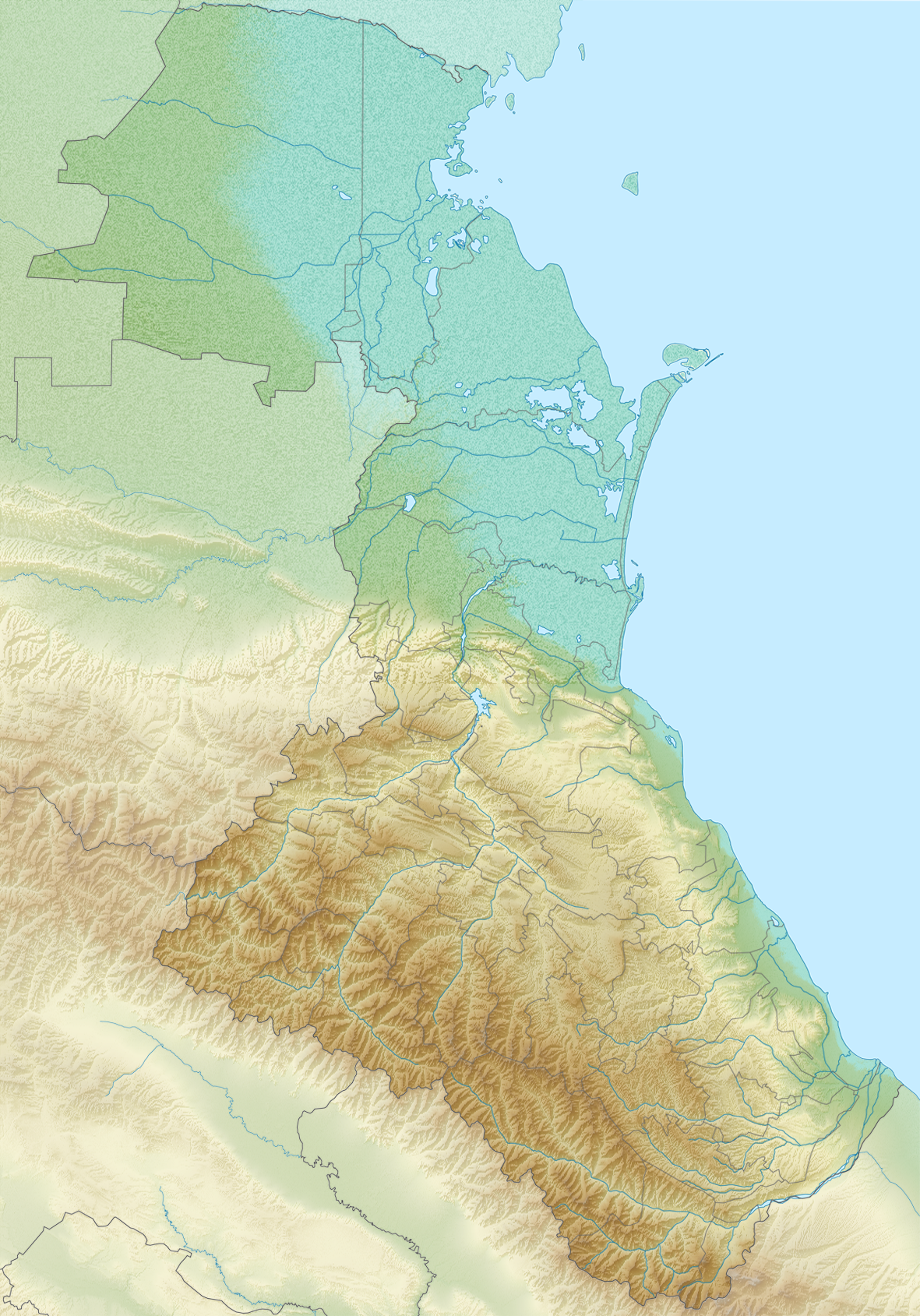
- Location of the abandoned synagogue in Dagestan

Religion
- Affiliation: Orthodox Judaism (former)
- Ecclesiastical or organizational status: Synagogue
- Status: Abandoned

Location
- Location: 44 Korkmasov Street, Buynaksk, Dagestan, North Caucasus
- Country: Russia
- Interactive map of Buynaksk Synagogue
- Coordinates: 42°49′N 47°07′E

Architecture
- Type: Synagogue architecture
- Funded by: The Jewish congregation
- Groundbreaking: 1860
- Completed: 1862
- Materials: Limestone blocks

Buynaksk Synagogue (also known as the Temir-Khan-Shurá Synagogue) (Russian: Буйнакская синагога "Темир-Хан-Шура"; Hebrew: בית הכנסת בוינאקסק) was a former Orthodox Jewish congregation and synagogue, located at 44 Korkmasov Street, in the city of Buynaksk in the Republic of Dagestan, in the North Caucasus of Russia. The building dates back to the 19th century and is a historical relic of the Jews of the Caucasus, built in 1862. It served the Jewish community for over a century. This is the only synagogue that has survived from the four that existed in the city at the beginning of the 20th century. Nowadays, the synagogue is closed and has ceased to perform its functions.

== History ==
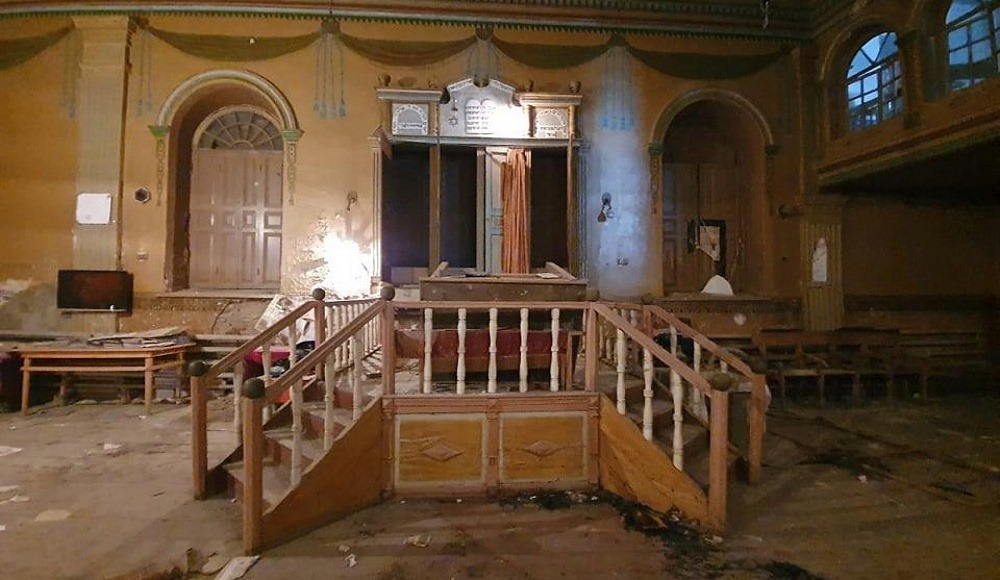
The interior of the Buynaksk Synagogue. 2022

During the Caucasian War, Jews found refuge in fortified fortresses built by soldiers of the tsarist army. In one of these fortresses, in Temir-Khan-Shurá (now Buynaksk), Jews moved from different villages such as Madzhalis, Dorgeli, Erpeli, as well as from Qırmızı Qəsəbə and Derbent.

In the 1850s, a community of Mountain Jews arose in the fortress, whose rabbis sent a petition to the tsar to build a synagogue. Permission was received, and in 1860, with funds collected by the entire community, construction began on a building according to a project sent from Lithuanian Kovno, now Kaunas. Not only residents helped, but also wealthy Jews from Derbent and Qırmızı Qəsəbə. By the holiday of Passover in 1862, the community celebrated the opening of the synagogue.

Some historians think that this synagogue was initially built by Ashkenazi Jews.

Historian Igor Semenov wrote:

"...the majority of the Jews of Temir-Khan-Shurá were not Mountain Jews, but Ashkenazi Jews, most of whom were members of the city’s merchant guild and were engaged in supplying the Russian army. Interestingly, until the February Revolution of 1917, Mountain Jews and Ashkenazi Jews together constituted the majority of the city’s population. However, these groups of Jews lived separately, and each had its own synagogue. One of them, the Ashkenazi synagogue, has survived to this day..."

The synagogue building served the Jewish community for over a century. In the 1990s, Mountain Jews began to leave Buynaksk, which led to the closure of the synagogue. Since the building is not in use, it is constantly exposed to sudden temperature changes and therefore inevitably deteriorates and collapses.

Acts of vandalism were committed against the synagogue building: windows were repeatedly broken, property was destroyed, and arson was committed. In 1995, an explosive device was placed under the gates of the synagogue. In 2021, Molotov cocktails were thrown into the windows of the synagogue. On May 21, 2022, another arson attack occurred. As a result, the walls of the building and its original interior decoration, including characteristic ornaments and stained-glass windows, are under threat of complete destruction.

Jewish organizations in Russia, along with local and republican authorities, discussed the restoration of the synagogue, but the issue was never resolved.

== See also ==
- History of the Jews in Buynaksk
- Judaism in Dagestan
- History of the Jews in Russia
- List of synagogues in Russia
