= Buynaksk Affair =

1960 incident of antisemitism in the Soviet Union

- Native name: Буйнакское дело
- Date: 1960/08/09
- Location: Buynaksk, Dagestan, Soviet Union
- Motive: blood libel against Jews, antisemitism
- Target: Jews
- Organised by: newspaper “Kommunist” in Buynaksk
- Outcome: Scandal in Western Europe, the United States, and Israel

The Buynaksk Affair was a scandal connected with the publication in the newspaper “Kommunist” in Buynaksk on 9 August 1960 of an article containing a blood libel against Jews — an accusation that Jews used the blood of non-believers in religious rituals.

After the publication, which was perceived as reflecting official policy, interethnic tensions in Dagestan intensified. Complaints from Jews did not lead to any serious measures being taken; however, following the scandal in the Western world, the authorities punished those involved in the publication and conducted a special campaign aimed at convincing Western public opinion that there was no antisemitism in the Soviet Union.

== Publication ==
On 9 August 1960, the newspaper “Kommunist”, published by the CPSU city committee of Buynaksk, printed an anti-religious article in the Kumyk language signed by a certain Daaya Marmudov. According to one version, he was a deputy of a local village council; according to another, an ordinary “non-party collective farmer”. The article was titled (kum: "Аллаха на да ел еркин"), which may be translated as “Even without God, the road is open” or “Without God, the road is also wide.” It contained, in particular, the following passage:

“They [the Jews] believed, according to their religion, that drinking Muslim blood once a year was beneficial. Some Jews accordingly purchased from 5 to 10 grams of Muslim blood, which they mixed with water in a large barrel and sold as water that had been in contact with the blood of a Muslim.”

== Jewish Reaction ==
As historian Semyon Charny wrote, the article had the effect of “a bombshell”. Published in the city’s main newspaper, it was perceived by the population as reflecting the official policy of the authorities. The situation was further aggravated by the fact that Buynaksk was the religious centre for all Muslims of the North Caucasus. It was therefore unsurprising that the publication of the article led to the widespread dissemination of anti-Jewish sentiment, and Jews feared pogroms.

The Mountain Jews, against whom the article had in fact been directed, immediately appealed to the Buynaksk city executive committee and to the chairman of the Spiritual Administration of the Muslims of the North Caucasus, Mufti Magomed Kurbanov, requesting a refutation of such grave accusations. However, the recipients of the appeal did not respond, no retraction was issued, tensions continued to escalate, and the Mountain Jews were forced to send a delegation to the capital of the Dagestan ASSR, the city of Makhachkala, to meet with the First Secretary of the Dagestan Regional Committee of the CPSU, Abdurakhman Daniyalov. On 17 August 1960, seven delegates representing the four largest Jewish communities of Derbent, Buynaksk, Khasavyurt, and Makhachkala departed in search of a solution to the crisis. In Makhachkala, the delegates were refused an audience with Daniyalov.

The following day, the newspaper published a notice stating that the author of the notorious article had been demoted and reassigned as a rural correspondent. The delegation continued to demand a meeting with the First Secretary, and on 29 August they were received by one of his aides, who promised that measures would be taken against those responsible for allowing the defamatory article to be published.

The delegates considered this insufficient, but opinions differed regarding further action. Three delegates, concluding that nothing more could be achieved, returned home, while four others, including Ashil Shamilov, Ilya Alkhasov, and Nison Shabayev, departed for Moscow on 5 September in an attempt to seek justice. In Moscow they appealed, among others, to the famous poet Ilya Ehrenburg. He later claimed that he had attempted to assist them, but without success. The delegates failed to secure meetings with Mikhail Suslov and Leonid Ilyichev, who served as Central Committee secretaries for agitation and propaganda, as well as with Politburo member Anastas Mikoyan and the Chairman of the Soviet of Nationalities of the USSR, Jānis Peive. The highest-ranking official who agreed to receive them was V. F. Ryazanov, deputy chairman of the Council for Religious Affairs. On 3 October, the delegates departed back for Makhachkala.

== Scandal in the West and Moscow's Reaction ==
At the same time, the Buynaksk article reached the West, where it caused widespread public reaction and was regarded as a vivid example of Antisemitism in the Soviet Union. The central Soviet leadership was inundated with indignant responses from representatives of the international public.

The authorities were forced to take urgent measures to contain the scandal. Their first priority was to reassure the Mountain Jews. To this end, the author of the article, Marmudov, was stripped of his deputy mandate. The editor-in-chief of “Kommunist” and the literary editor who had prepared Marmudov’s article for publication, Kh. Ataev, were dismissed. The leadership of the Buynaksk city executive committee received severe reprimands “for a lack of vigilance and political oversight”. In the 6 September 1960 issue of “Kommunist”, a retraction was published in which the article “Allahga da yol erkin” was described as “a gross political mistake” and “a wild and base slander” intended to “revive hatred toward Jews”.

In order to calm public opinion in Western Europe, the United States, and Israel, Agitprop was compelled to devise two separate operations. According to the first, information concerning state antisemitism in the USSR was to be refuted by an independent and respected observer in the West. For this role, André Blumel, a member of the presidential council of the “USSR–France” Society, was selected. On 8 October 1960, he met in Moscow with Ryazanov, deputy chairman of the Council for Religious Affairs, and Zadorozhny, an employee of the Council’s European Department. Ryazanov and Zadorozhny explained the appearance of articles such as Marmudov’s as excesses of anti-religious propaganda. Ryazanov assured Blumel that the Council and the Central Committee of the CPSU were firmly combating manifestations of antisemitism in the press, citing the “Buynaksk Affair” and the punishment of the responsible “scapegoats” as examples. Ryazanov’s arguments, together with the statement by Soviet Minister of Culture Yekaterina Furtseva — “there are around 220 million inhabitants in the USSR, and among them there are naturally several fools” — completely convinced Blumel that antisemitism in the Soviet Union was a marginal phenomenon which was not only unsupported by the authorities but actively persecuted by them. He later conveyed this view in a letter to I. Rabinovich, president of the Association of Former Citizens of the Soviet Union in Israel, who had been actively involved in campaigns exposing state antisemitism in the USSR, asserting that in France it would have been far more difficult to punish the author of an article similar to the one published in “Kommunist”.

The second operation was designed specifically to pacify the influential Jewish community in the United States. In a letter from Leonid Ilyichev to Central Committee Secretary for Ideology Pyotr Pospelov, it was proposed that a prepared letter be sent to the New York Herald Tribune, which had been among the most active newspapers discussing the situation of Jews in the USSR. The letter was to be transmitted through S. Rabinovich, the Moscow correspondent of the newspaper “Morgen Freiheit”, and signed by prominent Mountain Jews refuting claims of state antisemitism in the Soviet Union, in order to “repel the slanderous campaign undertaken by reactionary circles in the United States”.

The letter, signed by collective farmer and deputy of the Dagestan ASSR Gyulboor Davydova, writers Hizgil Avshalumov and Mishi Bakhshiev, Derbent depot locomotive engineer Khanuko Gadmilov, Buynaksk City Hospital physician Girshun Babaev, and collective farm chairman Shabotei Abramov, was primarily directed against an article by Joseph Newman published in the New York Herald Tribune on 4 November 1960 concerning the Mountain Jews. Newman argued, partly on the basis of the article published in “Kommunist”, that the Mountain Jews in the USSR existed in the position of a discriminated minority.

Newman’s article was described as “a gross distortion of the actual state of affairs”, and Newman himself was accused of misleading readers of the New York Herald Tribune. In contrast to Newman’s article, the life of the Mountain Jews was depicted in highly positive terms, the list of signatories itself being presented as proof. According to the authors of the letter, the article “Allahga da yol erkin” had been “an exceptional case … a mistake by irresponsible journalists made without any malicious intent”. The authors declared that “nothing of the sort has ever happened and, we are confident, never will happen”, and assured readers that those responsible for the publication of the article had received appropriate punishment. Inconvenient facts were omitted or distorted in the letter. For example, it failed to mention that the retraction of Marmudov’s article and the punishment of those responsible — in reality, merely “scapegoats” — had occurred not on 10 August, as the letter claimed, but only on 6 September, nearly a month later and only after angry protests from international public opinion.

== Subsequent Events ==
The Buynaksk blood libel became the most well-known case of its kind in the USSR. Although the authorities succeeded in containing the scandal, its repercussions spread to Central Asia and the South Caucasus, where, beginning in 1961, a number of new blood libel incidents involving local populations occurred: in Margilan (1961 or 1962), Tashkent (1962 or 1964), Tsqaltubo (1963), Zestaponi (1964), and Kutaisi (1965).

== See also ==
- History of the Jews in Buynaksk
