= Erpeli =

Erpeli Эрпели
- Selo
- Location within Republic of Dagestan Location within Russia
- Coordinates: 42°48′N 46°58′E
- Country: Russia
- Region: Republic of Dagestan
- District: Buynaksky District
- Time zone: UTC+3:00

Erpeli (Russian: Эрпели) is a rural locality (a selo) and the administrative centre of Erpelinsky Selsoviet, Buynaksky District, Republic of Dagestan, Russia. The population was 3,412 as of 2010. There are 33 streets.

== Geography ==
Erpeli is located 14 km west of Buynaksk (the district's administrative centre) by road, on the Shuraozen River. Verkhny Karanay and Nizhneye Ishkarty are the nearest rural localities.
