= Goodbye Japan =

1942 book by Joseph Newman

- Title page for Goodbye Japan (1942)
- Author: Joseph Newman
- Language: English
- Genre: Non-fiction
- Publication date: 1942
- Publication place: United States

Goodbye Japan is a non-fiction book on Japan written by an American journalist Joseph Newman published in 1942. It was intended to reveal the position and intentions of that country just before the attack on Pearl Harbor.

== Overview ==
At the time, many Americans sincerely believed that Japan was unjustly marked as an aggressor, a nation with friendly intentions to make peace and to help with the progress of Asian neighbors. They also thought that it was a good business partner and a force for the maintenance of order in its sphere of influence. The purpose of the book was to alert the American public to the real Japanese intentions.

== Synopsis ==
From his experience in Japan, Joseph Newman exposed to the Americans the hidden Japanese plans of conquest and the extremes of Japanese militarism. He presented the actual state of life in Japan during the war, totally different from the beautiful image presented in Japanese propaganda, and through Radio Tokyo or the Domei Tsushin Press Agency.

Newman obtained permission from the General Director of New York Herald Tribune, George Cornish, to use material he had gathered while working in Japan before 1941. The book was printed in New York City in 1942.

== Detailed synopsis ==
The original edition has 246 pages and is divided into ten chapters. After a preface explaining the intention of the book and giving some comments on Japanese thinking, in the first chapter the author explains in detail the real nature of the Japanese establishment, its history and the real location of political and military power in then nation. The second chapter exposes the Japanese conquest plan. The third chapter talks of the indoctrination of Asian leaders using material from visits Newman made, accompanied by other journalists and with some restrictions, to Chinese occupied lands and Manchukuo.

The next two chapters cover the Japanese control of mass media, strict press censorship and the difficulty faced by foreign correspondents and journalists. The next chapter covers difficulties Japanese faced during Sino-Japanese War and pre-war 1941 period before Pearl Harbor strike. In the next two chapters Newman discusses the complicated political infighting and factionalism.

The next chapter tells of the growth of local xenophobic action against foreigners, and local political movements and Japanese aggression against Western powers in East Asia. The final chapters refer to the latest political-military local actions, diplomatic movements, the hostility between Japan and United States, the proposal of a Japanese invasion plan against the Soviet Union in Eastern Siberia taking advantage of the German attack on European Russia, the last working days of foreign journalists (including Newman himself) and the evacuation of the last Americans and other foreign residents, just a short time before the Pearl Harbor Attack, and the return to San Francisco via Hawaii.

The book is an interesting historical source about political environment and everyday life in the Japanese Empire in the 1940s.

== Additional bibliography ==
"Japanese inner politics and pre-war and wartime lifestyle (1930s–41)"

- John Whitney Hall,"The Japanese Empire", published in 1967
- Frederick Moore,"With Japan's Leaders", New York, 1942
- Joseph Newman,"GoodBye Japan", published in New York, March 1942
- Edward Behr,"The Last Emperor", published by Recorded Picture Co. (Productions) Ltd and Screenframe Ltd, 1987

"Japanese actions in Chinese-Japanese conflict (1937–45)"

- Agnes Smedley,"Battle Hymn of China"
- Chiang Kai Shek,"The Soviet Russia in China"
- Wego W.K. Chiang,"How the Generalissimo Chiang Kai Shek gained the Chinese- Japanese eight years war, 1937–1945"
- Alphonse Max,"Southeast Asia Destiny and Realities", published by Institute of International Studies, 1985.

"Japanese actions in Pacific conflict (1941–45)"

- Robert Laffont,"Le Deferlement Japonaise"(Vol I and II), published in France, 1968
- Robert Leckie,"Challenge for the Pacific"
- Donald Macintyre,"The Battle for the Pacific"
- Andrieu D'Albas,"Marine Imperiale"
- Frank Bernard,"L'Epopee du Pacifique"
- Friedrich Ruge,"Deer Seekrieg 1939–1945"
- R.Inoguchi and T.Nakajima,"Kamikaze Tokubetsu Kogeki Kai"
- Germain Roland,"Kamikaze"
