= Yaakov Yitzhaki =

Founder of Be'er Ya'akov, Israel

Rabbi Yaakov Yitzhakovich Yitzhaki
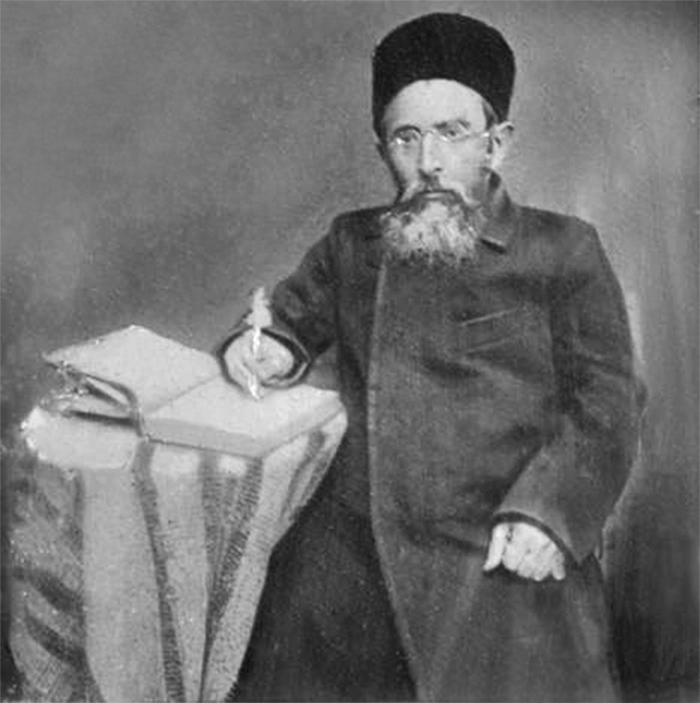
- Title: Crown rabbi of Southern Dagestan and Azerbaijan

Personal life
- Born: Yaakov Yitzhakovich Yitzhaki; September 1, 1846 Derbent, Caucasus Viceroyalty, Russian Empire
- Died: June 11, 1917 (aged 70) Jerusalem, Ottoman Empire
- Spouse: Chasida
- Children: 5
- Parent(s): Rabbi Yitzhak ben Yaakov, Naamah
- Education: yeshiva in Bila Tserkva
- Occupation: Rabbi
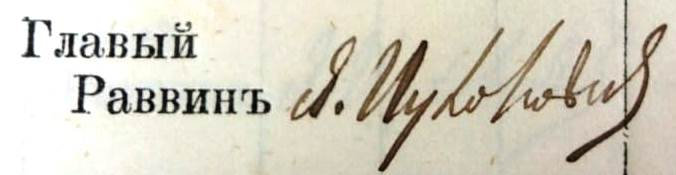
- Signature

Religious life
- Religion: Judaism
- Profession: Rabbi

Jewish leader
- Began: 1880

Yaakov Yitzhaki (Russian: Ицхаки, Я́ков Ицхоко́вич; Hebrew: יעקב יצחקי; September 1, 1846 – June 11, 1917) was a rabbi, scholar, religious Zionist and founder of the settlement of Be'er Ya'akov.

== Biography ==
Yaakov Yitzhaki was born in Derbent in present-day Dagestan, Russia, into a family of Mountain Jews. He received his religious education from his father, Rabbi Yitzhak ben Yaakov, and, like his father, at a yeshiva in Bila Tserkva. In 1868, when he was 22 years old, with the consent of the elders of the community, his father appointed him chief rabbi and religious judge of Derbent. Yitzhaki studied secular sciences and the Russian language in a realschule. He kept in touch with orientalists, including Abraham Harkavy and Judah Chorny.

In the 1880s, he was appointed by the tsarist government as crown rabbi of the Mountain Jews of Southern Dagestan and Azerbaijan.

Yitzhaki contacted Jewish communities in Poland, Romania, Lithuania, Turkey, Bukhara, Persia, Kurdistan and Palestine. He was interested in literature, Jewish studies, religious studies and archeology. He was a member of the "Higher Education" organization, which wrote and published articles in the Historical Jewish Press: "Hamagid", "Recommended", "Lebanon", "The Collector", and other popular magazines.

He compiled the first Juhuri-Hebrew dictionary and a brief history of the Mountain Jews.

In 1876, Yitzhaki visited the Land of Israel for the first time, and in 1887 for the second time. In 1907 he moved there, where he organized a group of Jewish immigrants who founded the settlement of Be'er Ya'akov.

During the First World War, Yaakov Yitzhaki suffered from hunger and died of exhaustion in Jerusalem. He was buried on the Mount of Olives.

== Archive ==
In 1974 Yitzhaki's son Yitzhak Yitzhaki gave the part of his father's archive that he had preserved to the Central Archive of the History of the Jewish People in Jerusalem. The collection has been digitized and is available online at the archive's website.
