= Be'er Ya'akov =

Be'er Ya'akov בְּאֵר יַעֲקֹב بئر يعقوب
- City (from 2021)

Hebrew transcription(s)
  - ISO 259: Be'er Y'qob
  - Also spelled: Be'er Ya'aqov (official)
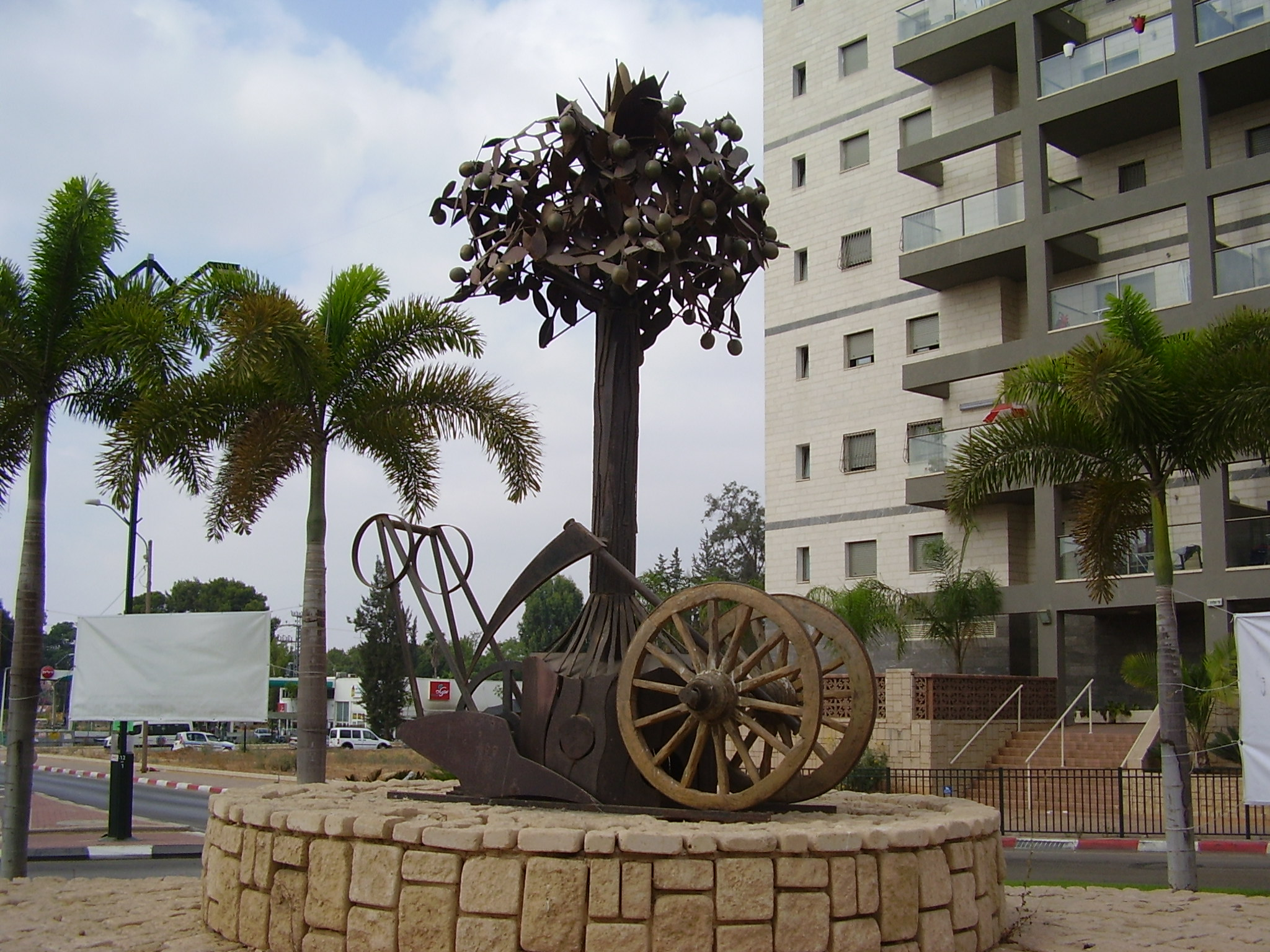

- Location within Central Israel
- Coordinates: 31°56′33″N 34°50′1″E
- Country: Israel
- District: Central
- Subdistrict: Ramla
- Natural Region: Ramla
- Founded: 1907

Government
  - Head of Municipality: Nissim Gozlan

Area
  - Total: 9,480 dunams (9.48 km^{2}; 3.66 sq mi)

Population (2024)
  - Total: 37,491
  - Density: 3,950/km^{2} (10,200/sq mi)
- Name meaning: Jacob's well
- Website: b-y.org.il

Be'er Ya'akov (Hebrew: בְּאֵר יַעֲקֹב, lit. 'Jacob's Well') is a city in central Israel, near Ness Ziona and Rishon Lezion. The town has an area of 8,580 dunams (~8.6 km^{2}), and had a population of 37,491 in 2024.

== History ==
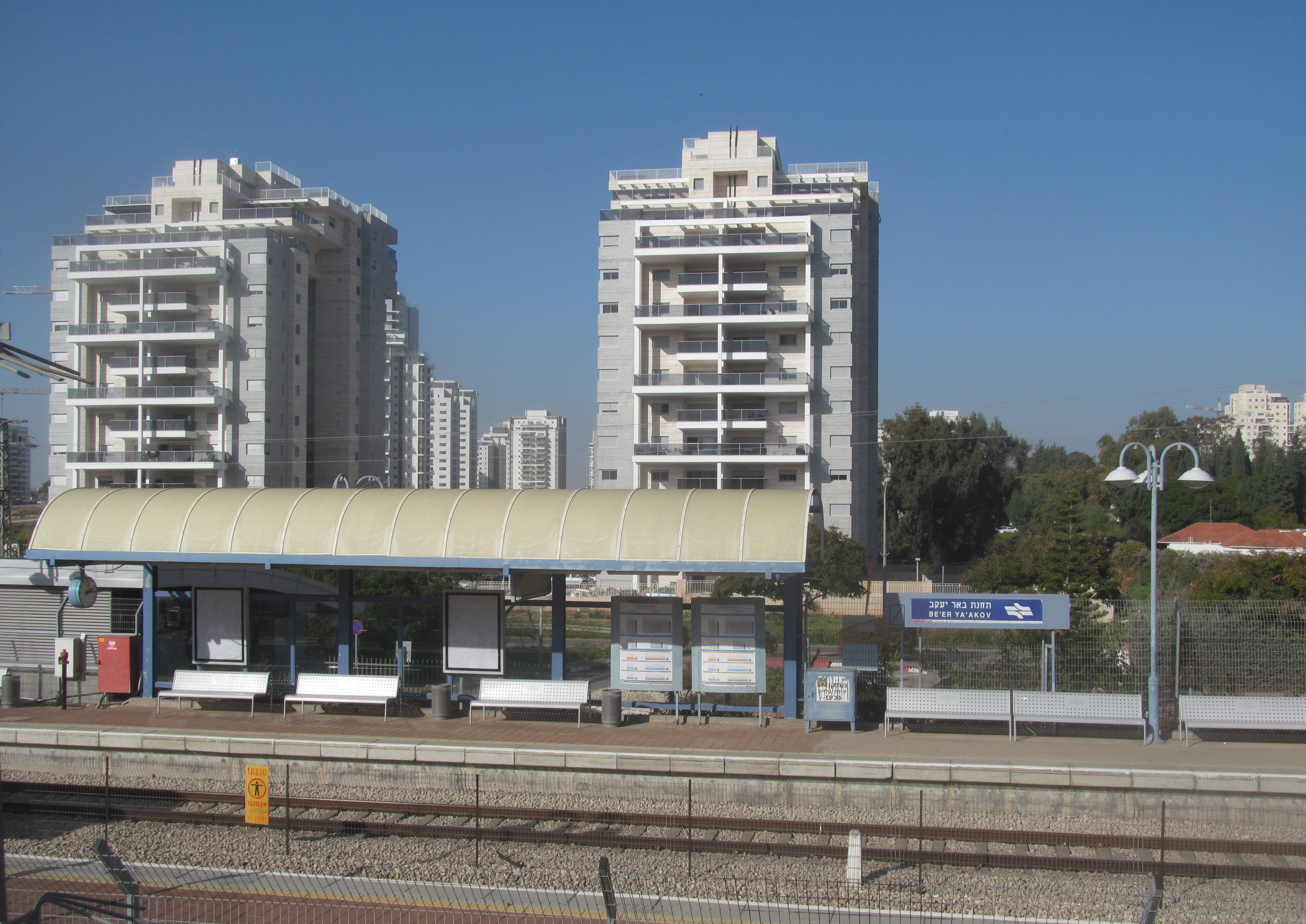
Be'er Ya'akov railway station

Be'er Ya'akov was established in 1907 on 2,000 dunams of land purchased by a company headed by Meir Dizengoff from a Lutheran German colony the previous year. It was divided into two sectors, one for immigrants from Russia, Poland, Romania, Bulgaria, Argentina, and Iran, and the other for Mountain Jews from Dagestan. It was named after Yaakov Yitzhaki, a rabbi and pioneer from the Mountain Jewish community. Yitzhaki headed the Mountain Jewish pioneers who settled there.

In 1909, 25 families were living in Be'er Ya'akov, and tensions existed between the Ashkenazi and Dagestani families. In 1910, the first elementary school was established. According to a census conducted in 1922 by the British Mandate authorities, Be'er Ya'akov had 131 inhabitants, which had increased in the 1931 census to 265 residents in 58 houses. By 1947, it had a population of 400. It achieved local council status in 1949.

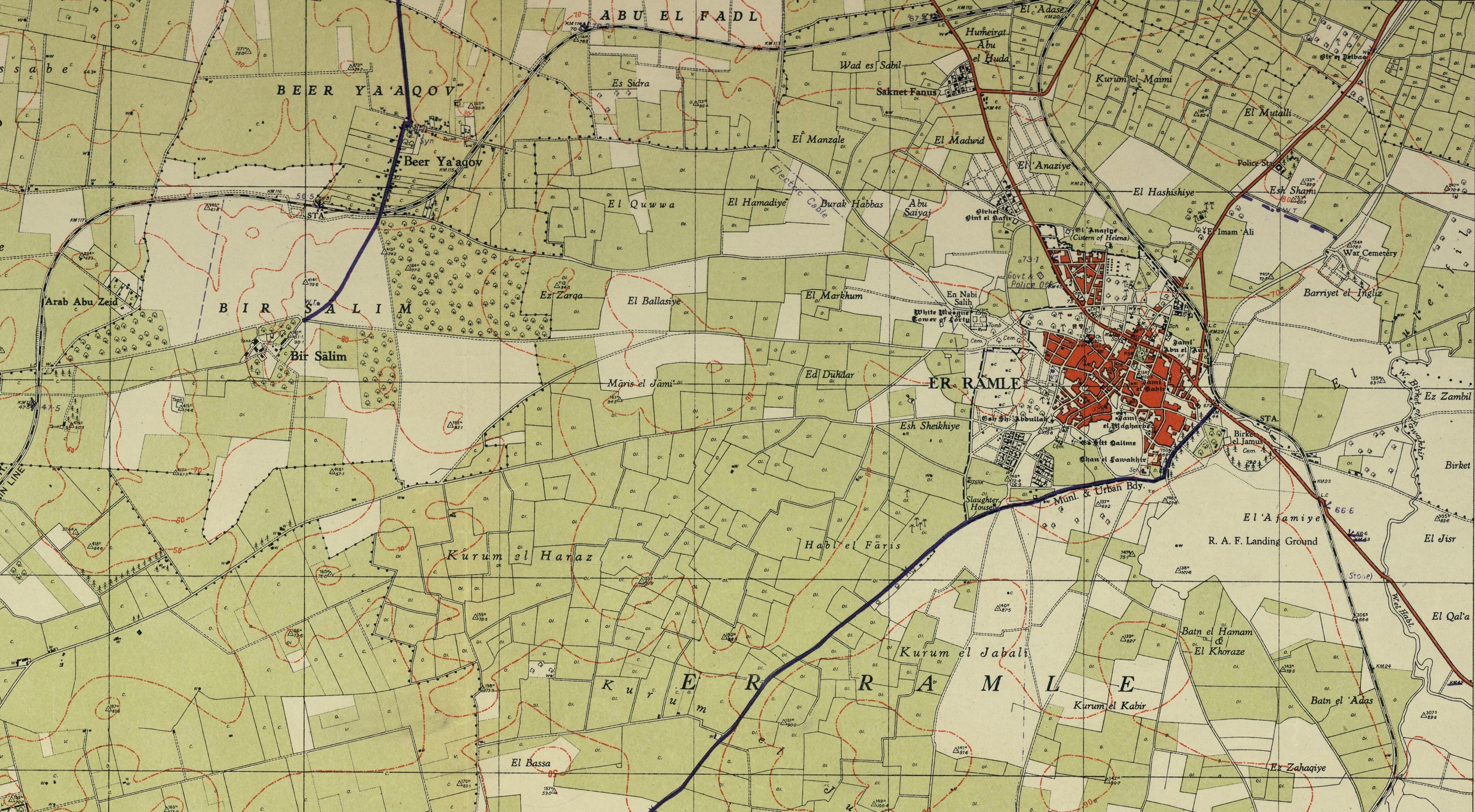
Be'er Ya'akov 1941 1:20,000

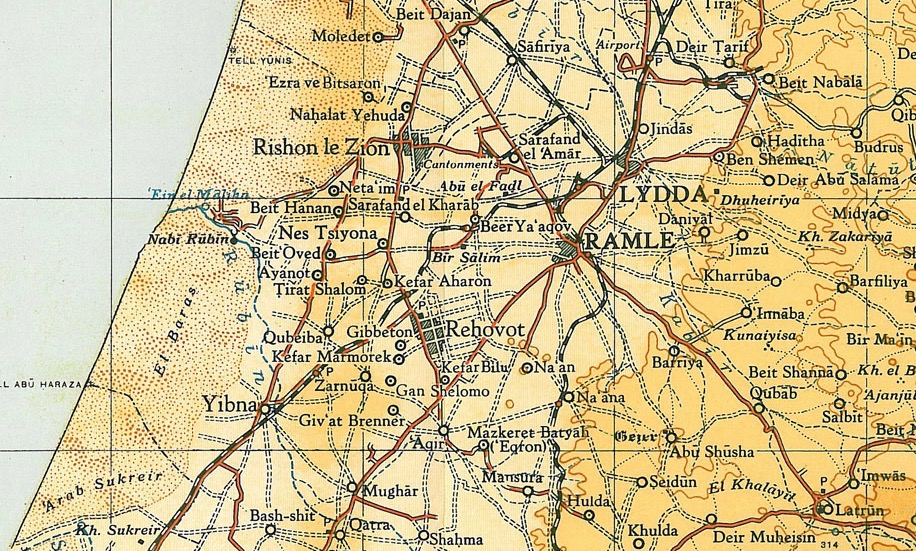
Be'er Ya'akov 1945 1:250,000

During the 1948 Arab–Israeli War, and until the Israeli capture of Ramla in July 1948, Be'er Ya'akov was on the front line. The population at that time was evacuated and a new settlement, Be'er Shalom, was established nearby by members of Kibbutz Buchenwald, the first pioneer training group formed in post-World War II Germany.

In 2017, a plan was approved to build on the land vacated by the Tzrifin military bases which are being relocated to the Negev. The plan envisions Be'er Ya'akov with a population of 100,000. Be'er Ya'akov is currently undergoing a construction boom, with numerous residential and commercial developments planned or under construction, along with numerous schools and daycare centers, cultural institutions, and a 1,000-seat sports arena. A metro system for the city which will terminate at Ben Gurion International Airport is also planned, with work scheduled to commence in 2028.

== Demographics ==
Year	Population
1972	4,100
1983	4,800
1995	7,500
2008	9,700
2022	31,439
2024	37,493

== Economy ==
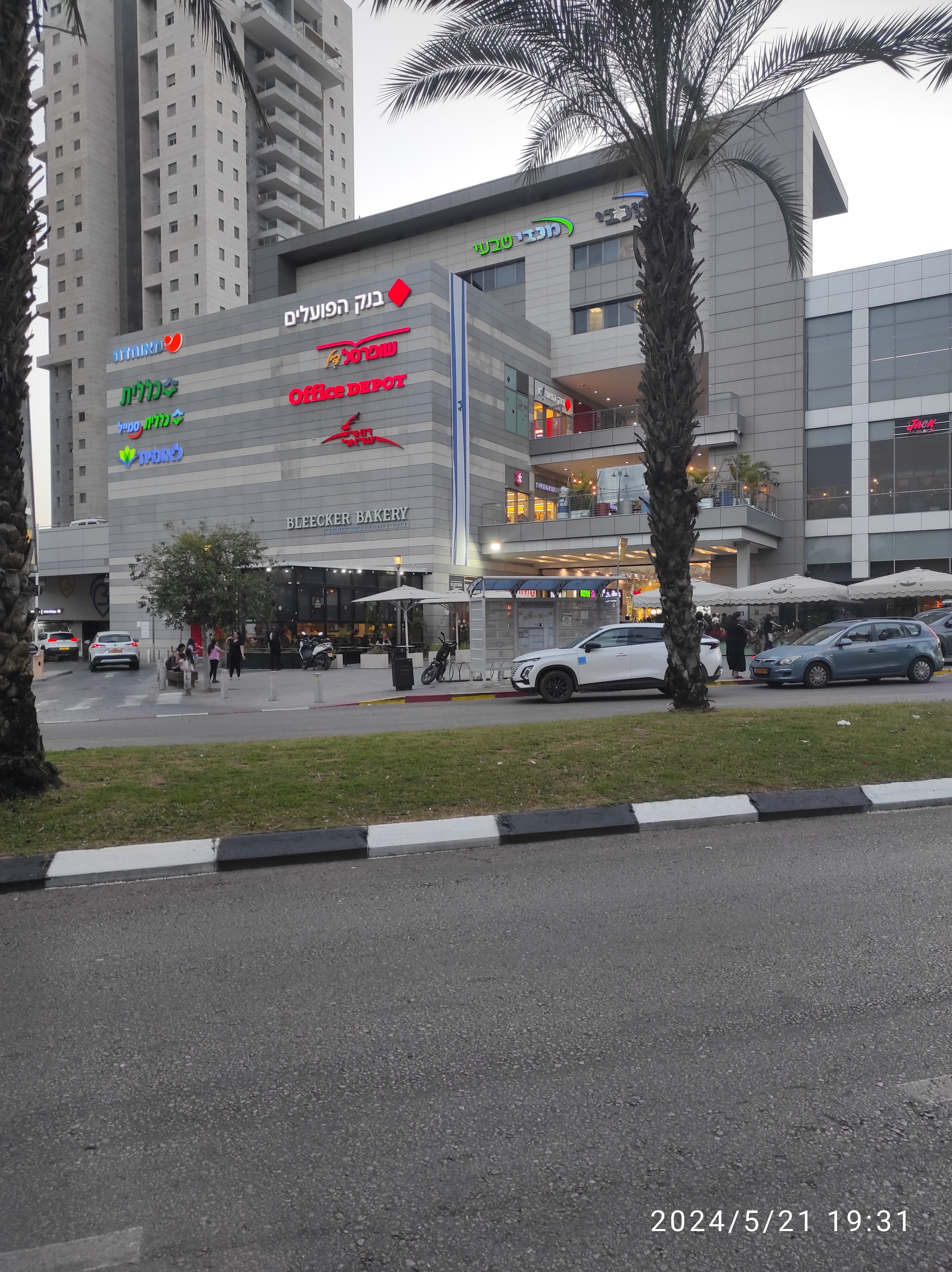
Be'er Ya'akov Shopping mall

IAI's MLM Division, Israel's main missile assembly facility is located in the south of Be'er Ya'akov. The Jericho and Arrow missiles and the Shavit launch vehicle are assembled there. The facility area is situated east of Diezengoff Street.

== Healthcare ==
Two hospitals are located in Be'er Ya'akov: Yitzhak Shamir Medical Center (near Tzrifin), and Shmuel HaRofe Geriatric Hospital.

== Sports ==
- Maccabi Be'er Ya'akov is the local football club.
- Maccabi Be'er Ya'akov B.C., the local basketball club, plays in Liga Leumit, the second tier.

== Transportation ==
Be'er Ya'akov is served by the Be'er Ya'akov Railway Station, for trains on the Binyamina-Ashkelon line.

== Voting Patterns ==
In the 2022 election, 57 percent of voters in Be'er Ya'akov voted for the right-wing coalition led by Benjamin Netanyahu, while 41 percent voted for the parties of the parties of the center-left coalition led by Yair Lapid and 0.1 percent voted for the Arab parties.

In the 2026 election, 50 percent of voters in Be'er Ya'akov voted for the parties of the right-wing coalition led by Benjamin Netanyahu, while 41 percent voted for the parties of the center-left coalition led by Gadi Eisenkot and 0.2 percent voted for the Arab parties. An additional 5.5 percent voted for the Reservists, and 2.5 percent voted for Amcha Yisrael. Voter turnout increased 41 percent from the 2022 election.

== Notable residents ==
- Ron Atias, taekwondo athlete who represented Israel at the 2016 Summer Olympics
- Noam Dar, professional wrestler
- Moshe Peretz, singer
- Yaakov Yitzhaki, founder of the settlement of the city Be'er Ya'akov
- Idan Zalmanson (born 1995), basketball player
