= Joseph Newman (journalist) =

Joseph Newman (11 December 1912 – 15 April 1995) was an American journalist and writer from New York City. He worked for the New York Herald Tribune under George Cornish as a Japan correspondent, living in Japan with his wife Mary.

== Japan ==
During his period of residence in Japan, he made contacts with other foreign residents, journalists and some important personalities linked with the Japanese government, and became known for his in-depth reporting on the local military-political establishment before the outbreak of the Pacific War.

He was acquainted with members of the German and Italian communities, and had connections in the Japanese Army and Navy ministries. From these sources he was able to file reports with the American media, later writing the book Goodbye Japan, where he related his experiences there. His knowledge about the regime made him mistrustful of the courteous and amicable words and agreeable speeches that the government produced for overseas consumption via its mouthpiece, Radio Tokyo, or the official press agency, Domei Tsushin. He knew that these "agreeable words" hid the real intentions of the ruling Imperial Way Faction (皇道派, Kōdōha), which were:

- The total defeat of the major powers in the area: United States, Great Britain, France, Dutch Indies and Soviet Union
- Total dominion of the West Pacific area
- The creation of an Asian political and economic bloc
- The extension of Japanese lifestyle, thinking and culture in conquered territories
- The expansion of Empire frontiers beyond present territories, including brief description of a large-scale imperial army operation against the Soviet Union in Eastern Siberia, taking advantage of the German attack in European Russia, prior to the attack on Pearl Harbor among the possible future fight with their current allies the Axis powers for total world dominion

Newman thought that if the American people understood the Japanese political-military movements from the Meiji period to the days before December 1941, it could have prevented the Pearl Harbor disaster and the outbreak of the Pacific War. Additionally he countered the statement made by some in the West that Japan was a victim of German Nazi movements, by showing from his observations in the country that Japan had been more aggressive in the Asian mainland that Germany had been in Poland.

=== Exodus ===
When the American State Department ordered all American residents to leave Japan because of hostility toward foreigners, Newman asked his boss for a leave of absence from Tokyo. He suspected he was constantly under police surveillance there. Later, his boss George Cornish gave him leave and Newman left for Yokohama aboard the Tatsuta Maru (one of three N.Y.K. vessels provided by the Japanese government to evacuate the Americans before the outbreak of hostilities). Thanks to his friends in the Japanese government, Newman obtained permission to leave the country, saying that he was taking a holiday in Hawaii.

Newman arrived in Honolulu for a month's vacation. He was surprised at the easy access to Pearl Harbor. It was possible for anyone to observe movements and take photographs. He contrasted this with the tight security he had observed in Japan. On 5 December at 12:30 pm, Newman and his wife boarded the luxury vessel SS Lurline for return to New York. At 10:00 am on 7 December the captain announced that the Japanese had bombed Pearl Harbor and advised the passengers of measures to take in the event of Japanese attack on the ship.

== USSR ==
Joseph Newman was also the chief correspondent for the Herald Tribune in Moscow after the war, and was host to John Steinbeck during his famous trip there.

== Later life ==
After leaving Moscow, Newman moved to Argentina for several years before moving to New York. just in his period in Buenos Aires, in 1943 he authorized the Editorial Poseidon, Sociedad de Responsabilidad limitada the publication of your book in Spanish under the title "Adios al Japon"; Eight years later he and his family settled in Washington D.C. where he remained until he died.

In 1993, the Asahi Shimbun republished 'Goodbye Japan,' translated into Japanese. They invited Newman to return to Tokyo for an opening ceremony for the book. It was the first time Newman had been in Japan in fifty years. The book is still available in both the United States and Japan today.

== See also ==
- Goodbye Japan, written by Joseph Newman
