= Karani =

Karani كاراني
- Village
- Location within Iran
- Coordinates: 25°38′25″N 61°00′56″E
- Country: Iran
- Province: Sistan and Baluchestan
- County: Chabahar
- Bakhsh: Central
- Rural District: Pir Sohrab

Population (2025)
  - Total: 226
- Time zone: UTC+3:30 (IRST)
  - Summer (DST): UTC+4:30 (IRDT)

Karani (Persian: كاراني, also Romanized as Kārānī) is a village in Pir Sohrab Rural District, in the Central District of Chabahar County, Sistan and Baluchestan Province, Iran. At the 2025 census, its population was 226.
