= Ilya Anisimov =

Russian Ethnographer

Ilya Sherebetovich Anisimov
- Илья Шеребетович Анисимов
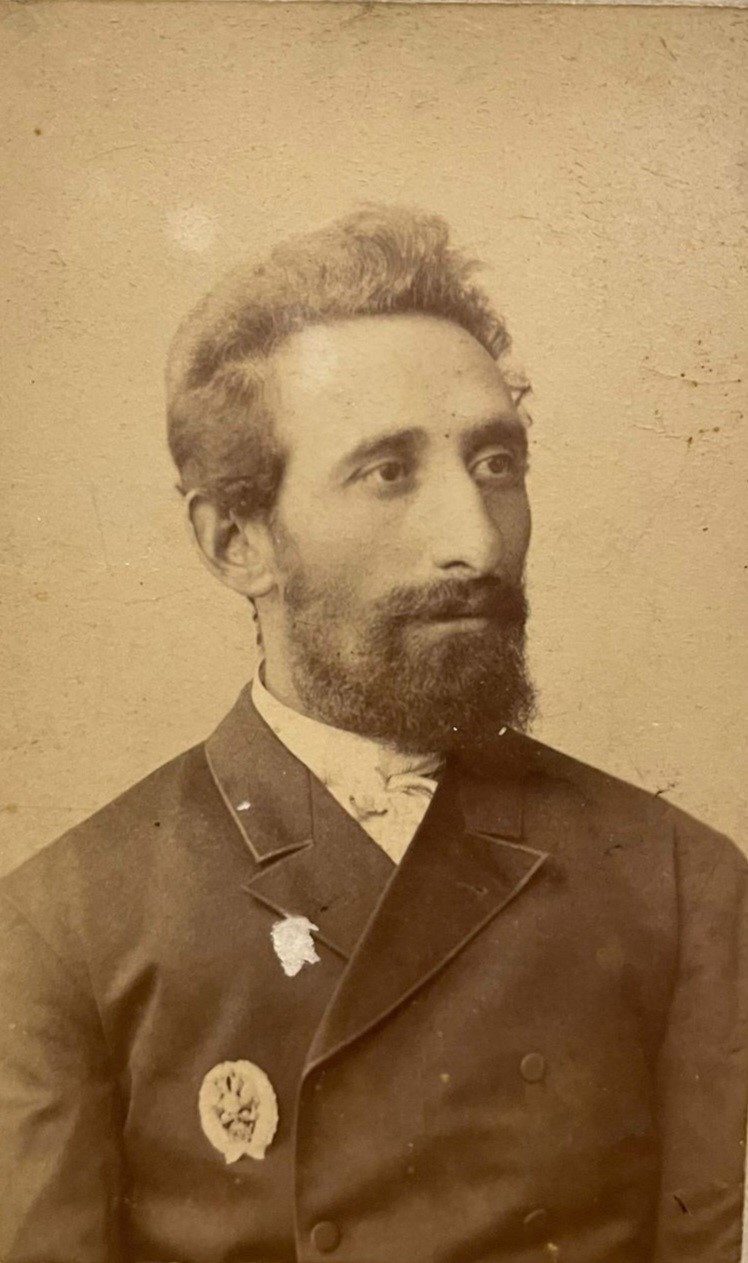
- Anisimov in 1896
- Born: 29 May 1862; Tarki, Dagestan Oblast, Russian Empire
- Died: 3 February 1928 (aged 65); Grozny, Chechen Oblast, Soviet Union
- Education: Imperial Moscow Technical School (1891)
- Scientific career
- Fields: Ethnography; ethnology; engineering

Ilya Sherebetovich Anisimov (Russian: Илья Шеребетович Анисимов; Judeo-Tat: Элиягу бен Шербет Нисим-оглы; Hebrew: איליה אניסימוב; 29 May 1862 – 3 February 1928) was a Russian ethnographer, ethnologist, and engineer, known for his ethnographic study on Mountain Jews. He was the first person of Mountain Jewish descent to receive higher education in the schools of the Russian Empire. Anisimov is the author of the famous work "Caucasian Mountain Jews" (Russian: Кавказские евреи-горцы). He was also a member of the Baku branch of the Society for the Promotion of Culture among the Jews of Russia.

== Biography ==
=== Lineage ===
Ilya Anisimov was born in the village of Tarki in the Temir-Khan-Shurinskiy district of the Dagestan Oblast. He was the second of five sons in his family.

According to Anisimov’s eldest daughter, Gul-Bike, he received the name Eliyahu (Ilya) in honor of the first rabbi of Derbent, Eliyahu ben Mushael (1781–1848), who was respected by all Mountain Jews. This rabbi founded the chief rabbinate of Mountain Jews in the city and made Derbent their spiritual capital.

His father, Sherebet Nisim-ogly, studied at the Volozhin Yeshiva and was known as one of the most educated rabbis of his time.

After studying at the Volozhin Yeshiva, Sherebet Nisim-ogly spent three years in Jerusalem. In 1884, he published the book "Antiquities of the Mountain Jews" (Russian: Древности горских евреев). In 1906, he returned to Dagestan, became the first rabbi in Tarki, where he opened a Jewish school, and later in Temir-Khan-Shurá.

=== Education ===
Having received a good home education thanks to his father, Anisimov was accepted directly into the sixth grade of the government city school (real school) in Temir-Khan-Shurá in September 1882.

In 1883, Anisimov entered the mountain department of the Stavropol gymnasium, where he completed a year of study. The certificate he received upon graduation from the gymnasium on 16 June 1884, confirmed that he had the right "to enter higher specialized schools, undergoing only a verification test." Anisimov had to work hard to study: his parents and relatives considered education unnecessary and, according to custom, wanted to marry him early to a girl to whom he had been engaged when he was only three years old. Thanks to the support of the school authorities (Anisimov studied at the state’s expense and received a scholarship from the Military-People’s Administration of the Caucasus Region), Anisimov managed to convince his parents that the authorities demanded he be sent to a gymnasium.

After graduating from the gymnasium in the summer of 1884, Anisimov left for Saint Petersburg.

In 1884, Anisimov entered the Imperial Moscow Technical School. He successfully graduated from it in 1891.

Anisimov managed to get a job in Moscow, but soon he left for Temir-Khan-Shurá, where he had to fully experience the consequences of the discriminatory laws adopted by the tsarist government in relation to the Jewish population of the Russian Empire.

=== Scientific work ===
On the advice of the chief rabbi of Southern Dagestan, Khazkel Mushailov, Anisimov began to study his people ethnographically, describing the wedding and funeral rites of the Mountain Jews. Anisimov enthusiastically took up the work, and in 1881, the essay “Caucasian Mountain Jews” appeared in the Russian-Jewish magazine "Rassvet" (Russian: Рассвет) in Saint Petersburg. Later, in a revised form, it was included in a monograph on Mountain Jews.

An acquaintance with the professor of Imperial Moscow University, the outstanding Russian scientist Vsevolod Miller, significantly influenced the future life of Ilya Anisimov. In June 1883, during a trip to the Caucasus, Miller visited the village of Nalchik, where he met Mountain Jews. During a conversation, one of the Nalchik rabbis, at Miller’s request, dictated to him several words and phrases in the Judeo-Tat language, which Miller wrote down in his notebook:

Interested in this unique Iranian dialect, which had not yet been studied from either the grammatical or lexical side, I was looking for an opportunity to get to know it more thoroughly. Such an opportunity presented itself to me in Moscow, thanks to my acquaintance with a Mountain Jew, a student at the Imperial Technical School, I. Sh. Anisimov, who was the first of the Caucasian coreligionists to receive an education in Russian educational institutions. Over the course of two years, with Anisimov’s help, I studied his native language and compiled an essay on grammar and a dictionary.

Having read Anisimov’s article in "Rassvet," Miller attracted Anisimov to active work in the ethnographic department of the Society of Devotees of Natural Science, Anthropology, and Ethnography (OLEAE), which he headed.

On 31 October 1885, Anisimov gave a report at a meeting of the ethnographic department of OLEAE, where he presented statistical information he had collected about the number of Mountain Jews, named the settlements where they lived, and introduced those present to the religious beliefs of the Mountain Jews, especially highlighting elements of paganism.

In March 1886, Anisimov was elected a member of the ethnographic department of the Society of Devotees of Natural Science, Anthropology, and Ethnography. At the same time, he gave another report in which he described in detail the wedding ceremonies of the Mountain Jews.

At Miller’s suggestion, the Moscow Archeological Society commissioned Anisimov to travel to the Caucasus to collect historical and ethnographic materials about the Mountain Jews. For this purpose, the Society allocated him 300 rubles. Anisimov visited 88 cities and villages in the Dagestan and Terek regions, as well as in the Baku and Elizavetpol Governorate.

In Temir-Khan-Shurá, Anisimov met with the chief rabbi of Southern Dagestan, Khazkel Mushailov. Mushailov, who was planning to leave Dagestan for Jerusalem soon, gave Anisimov his notes in Hebrew. He had been collecting historical legends about the arrival of Jews in the Caucasus and various periods of the ethnic history of the Mountain Jews for a long time. After familiarizing himself with these valuable materials, Anisimov noted that "they contained much that was not at all in my historical legends" (letter to Miller, 22 June 1886).

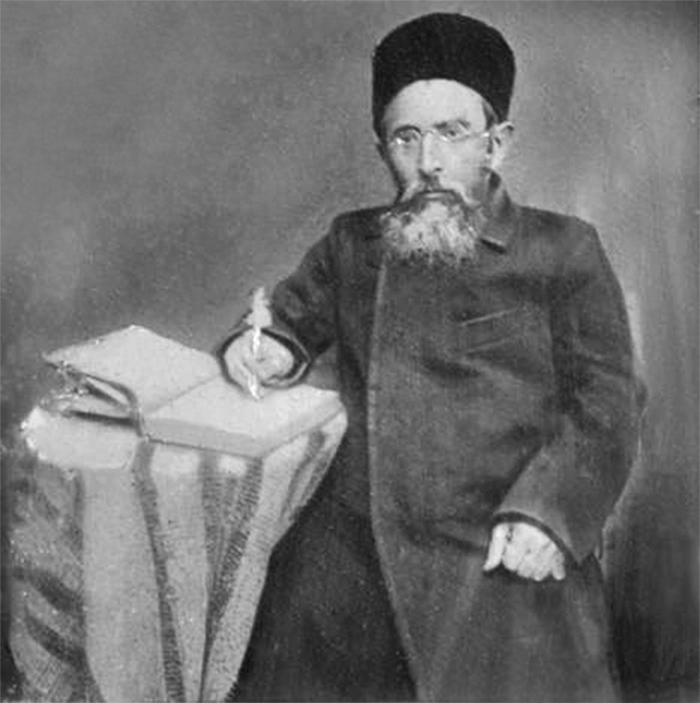
Yaakov Yitzhaki

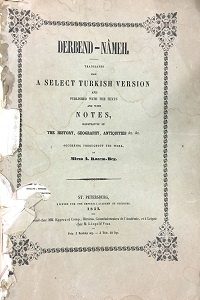
Derbend-Nama

The Chief Rabbi of Dagestan, Yaakov Yitzhaki, gave Anisimov his copy of the medieval manuscript “Derbend-Nama” (Russian: Дербенд-наме). Yitzhaki also provided him with some of his historical notes, which Anisimov used for his monograph on the Mountain Jews. During his expedition, Anisimov translated “Derbend-Nama” into Russian. In his opinion, this work could serve as a guiding star for compiling the history of the Mountain Jews.

The historical, ethnographic, and statistical information collected by Anisimov during the expedition served as material for his monograph “Caucasian Mountain Jews,” published with funds from the Natural Science Society in the Collection of Ethnographic Materials in Moscow in 1888. Anisimov dedicated this book to Miller.

In January 1905, Anisimov turned to Miller with a request for help:

One… cherished desire that I have been thinking about for a long time, but until now, being constantly busy with caring for my family, I could not find time to work on it. I am thinking of republishing the book in a significantly more widespread form, using for this purpose everything that is available in the literature on Mountain Jews, including, of course, placing in it many photographic illustrations from the life of Mountain Jews and the latest statistical data on them.

Miller’s response to his letter is unknown. Anisimov was not able to complete his work on a new version of his monograph, "Caucasian Mountain Jews."

In 1904, Anisimov moved to Grozny, where he continued to work as an oil engineer. For a long time, Anisimov headed the Committee of Mountain Jews of Grozny, which carried out extensive cultural and educational work among Grozny Jews. For several years, he was a member of the city council and also a member of the public self-government, heading the city oil commission.

In 1912–1913, Anisimov was a member of the Baku branch of the Society for the Promotion of Culture among the Jews of Russia.

The tragic events of the Civil War forced Anisimov to leave Grozny. For some time, he lived in Kislovodsk, where he took an active part in creating a cultural and educational circle of Mountain Jews. In the early 1920s, he settled briefly in Nalchik, and then in 1921, he left for Moscow.

Anisimov also wrote the play "In the Mountains of Dagestan" (Russian: В горах Дагестана).

After the death of his youngest daughter, Cecilia, Anisimov led a secluded life. Having lost his beloved wife and daughter, he was left completely alone.

Anisimov died on February 3, 1928. He was initially buried in the Grozny Jewish Cemetery. However, after some time, his children decided to rebury him in Moscow’s Donskoye Cemetery.

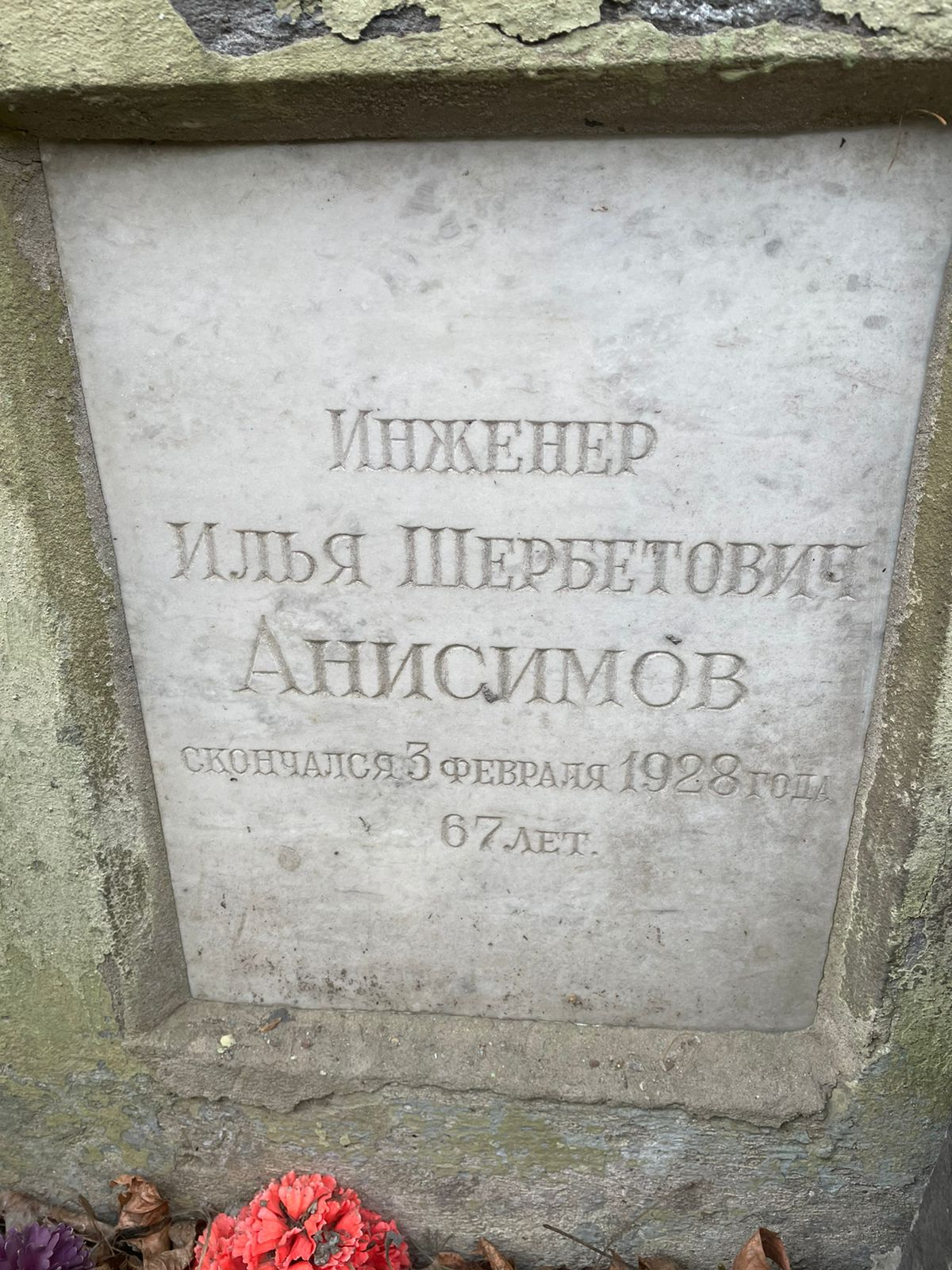
Grave of Ilya Anisimov at the Donskoy Cemetery, Moscow, Russia

== Family ==
On 1 July 1894, he married an Ashkenazi woman, Maria Savelyeva Weinshal. They met in Baku. Maria Weinshal kept her maiden name after marriage.

Maria Weinshal’s brother, Vladimir Savelyev Weinshal, was married to Karolina Lvovna Landau, the sister of Lev Landau’s father.

Maria Anisimov died of typhus, like her daughter, and was buried in Grozny.

The Anisimovs had four children: Leonid (1895-1955), Daniil (1896-1976), Gul-Bike (1898-1983), and Cecilia (1900-1927). In addition, Anisimov had an illegitimate son, Emmanuel, who lived with his mother in Makhachkala.

The three older children of the Anisimov family moved to Moscow when they grew up. The youngest daughter, Cecilia, married student Georgy Shpanin at the age of 21 and stayed to live in Baku. They had a son, Mikhail.

On 10 October 1927, at the age of 27, Cecilia Anisimova-Shpanina died of typhus.

== Legacy ==
Anisimov’s role as the founder of modern Mountain Jewish literature attracted significant attention, and books were written about him.

In 2002, an event was held to celebrate the 140th anniversary of Ilya Anisimov’s birth. The Moscow community of Mountain Jews played a special role in this event. The first reprint of the scientist’s widely known monograph “Caucasian Mountain Jews” was carried out under the editorship of Doctor of Philosophy S.I. Weinstein. Then, on the initiative of relatives, a personal exhibition of the artist Stanislav Shpanin, the scientist’s great-grandson, was held in the Israeli city of Netanya.

In the same year, Anisimov’s play “In the Mountains of Dagestan” was published.

Anisimov’s grandson, Mikhail Georgievich Shpanin (the son of his daughter Cecilia Ilyinishna Anisimova), wrote a book about him titled “Unknown about the Famous Mountain Jewish Ethnographer I. Sh. Anisimov.”

Yuri Isaevich Murzakhanov, a Russian ethnographer, also wrote a book about Anisimov.

On 18 December 2022, the Community Center of Mountain Jews in Moscow hosted historical and ethnographic readings dedicated to the 160th anniversary of Ilya Sherebetovich Anisimov. They discussed the scientific heritage of Ilya Anisimov and the importance of perpetuating the memory of the first Mountain Jewish scientist and ethnographer.

A separate exhibition was created in the Museum of Mountain Jews in Krasnaya Sloboda, where all of Anisimov’s works are presented.

== Works ==
- Кавказские евреи-горцы Caucasian Mountain Jews — М.: Типография Е.Г. Потапова, 1888.

== Literature ==
- Mordechai Altshuler // Ilya Anisimov – researcher of the Mountain Jews community — Moscow: Institute for Slavic Studies of the Russian Academy of Sciences - № 2 (4), pp. 19—32. 2020. ISSN 2658-3364 doc: 10.31168/2658-3364.2020.2.04
- Anisimov, Ilya Sherebetovich // Jewish Encyclopedia of Brockhaus and Efron. — Saint Petersburg, Vol. 2. Columns. 582-584. 1908-1913.
- Anisimova, Margarita Danilovna // The Tree of Life. — Moscow: Buki Vedi, pp. 606. 2024. ISBN 978-5-4465-4134-8
- Murzakhanov, Yuri Isaevich // Mountain Jewish ethnographer Ilya Sherebetovich Anisimov. Edited - S.I.Vainshtein. — Moscow: Science, pp. 39. 2002. ISBN 5-02-008842-0
- Shpanin, Mikhail Georgievich // Rereading the pages of our history: Unknown about the famous Mountain Jewish ethnographer I. Sh. Anisimov — London: Russian Media House, pp. 169. 2010.
