= Joseph Judah Chorny =

Russian traveller and scholar (1835–1880)

Joseph Judah Yakovlevich Chorny (Russian: Иосиф Иуда Яковлевич Чёрный; 20 April 1835 – 28 April 1880) was a Russian traveller and scholar.

His parents arranged for him to start working in the wine-growing industry, but his real passion was for travel and exploration, and he soon abandoned wine-growing. For eight years Chorny, with practically no finance, explored a great part of the Caucasus, Transcaucasia, and many Asiatic countries; studying everywhere the life, customs, and history of the inhabitants, and chiefly those of the Jews.

In 1875, on returning from his travels, he endeavored to publish his studies on the Jews of the countries he had visited, but failed to find the necessary money. He resumed the life of an explorer; and after five years of hardships and privations returned, in ill health and poverty, to Odessa, where he died, on 28 April 1880, shortly after his arrival.

Chorny was highly appreciated by the officials of the Russian government, and his studies on the Caucasus and Transcaucasia, published in various Russian papers, attracted the attention of the minister of the interior, Mikhail Loris-Melikov, who recommended Chorny to the protection of the governor-general of Odessa. The most noteworthy of Chorny's studies were:

- Kratkiya Istoricheskiya Svyedeniya o Gorskikh Yevreyakh Terskoi Oblasti, Terskiya Vyedomosti, 1869;
- Gorskie Yevrei, in Kavkaz, 1870, volume 3;
- On the Caucasian Jews, in Den, 1870, No. 38.

Chorny bequeathed his manuscripts to the Society for Promoting Culture Among the Russian Jews; and the latter commissioned Abraham Harkavy to edit them. They were published with Harkavy's notes under the title Sefer ha-Massa'ot (Book of Travels), at Saint Petersburg, in 1884.
