= Buynaksk =

Town in the Republic of Dagestan, Russia

Buynaksk Буйнакск
- Town

Other transcription(s)
  - Avar: Шура
  - Kumyk: Темирхан-Шура
  - Lak: ЩурахӀи
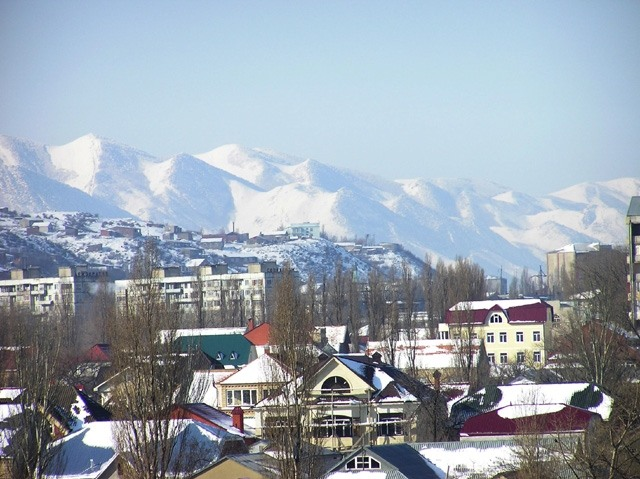
- Buynaksk in Winter

- Coat of arms
- Interactive map of Buynaksk
- Location of Buynaksk Buynaksk (Republic of Dagestan)
- Coordinates: 42°49′N 47°07′E
- Country: Russia
- Federal subject: Dagestan
- Founded: 1834
- Town status since: 1866
- Elevation: 490 m (1,610 ft)

Population (2010 Census)
  - Total: 62,623
  - Estimate (2024): 69,554 (+11.1%)
  - Rank: 255th in 2010

Administrative status
  - Subordinated to: Town of Buynaksk
  - Capital of: Buynaksky District, Town of Buynaksk

Municipal status
  - Urban okrug: Buynaksk Urban Okrug
  - Capital of: Buynaksk Urban Okrug, Buynaksky Municipal District
- Time zone: UTC+3 (MSK)
- Postal code: 368220
- OKTMO ID: 82705000001
- Website: buynaksk05.ru

Buynaksk (Russian: Буйнакск; Avar: Шура, romanized: Şura; Kumyk: Темирхан-Шура, romanized: Temirxan-Şura; Lak: ЩурахӀи, romanized: Schurahi) is a town in the Republic of Dagestan, Russia, located at the foothills of the Greater Caucasus on the Shura-Ozen River, 40 kilometers (25 mi) southwest of the republic's capital Makhachkala. Population: 62,623 (2010 census); 61,437 (2002 census); 56,783 (1989 Soviet census); 40,000 (1970).

== History ==
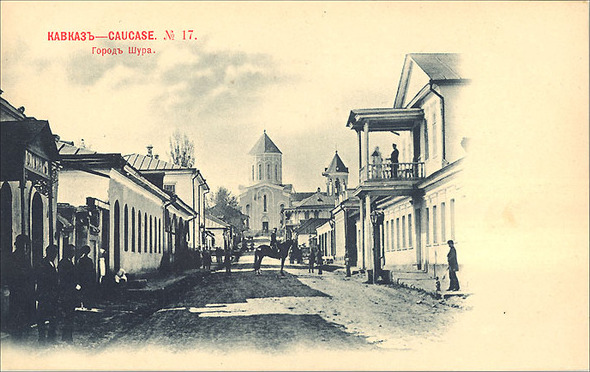
Temir-Khan-Shura in the 1900s

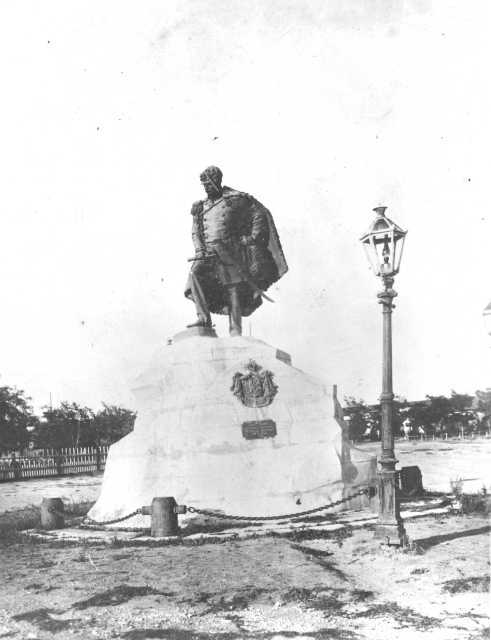
Monument to Moisey Argutinsky-Dolgoruky in Temir-Khan-Shura (founded in 1878, demolished in 1921)

Before 1922 Buynaksk was known as Temir-Khan-Shurá (Темир-Хан-Шура), that is, the lake or cliff of Tamerlane who is said to have camped here in 1396 after defeating Tokhtamysh during the Tokhtamysh-Timur war. It first appears in Russian annals in the 1590s when Muscovite ambassadors passed nearby on their way to Georgia. It remained a small town ruled by a Bek. In 1830 the Russians destroyed it when it sided with Kazi Mulla. In 1832 a Russian force under Klugenau camped here during Rosen's raid on Gimry. In 1834 Klugenau built a fort on the rock above the lake and it soon became the headquarters of the Apsheron Regiment and the most important Russian fort in the interior of Degestan during the Murid War. In 1849 Hadji Murad led a daring raid into the town. The place was unhealthy and Argutinsky drained the lake in 1858 to prevent the spread of disease. It was granted town status in 1866. During the Russian Empire, the settlement was the administrative capital of the Temir-Khan-Shurinsky Okrug and Dagestan Oblast. In 1920, it was the center of the ephemeral Mountainous Republic of the Northern Caucasus. On 13 November 1920, the government of the Russian SFSR declared Dagestan's autonomy during the congress of the Dagestani people, which took place in Temir-Khan-Shura. In 1922, the town was renamed Buynaksk in honor of Bolshevik revolutionary Ullu-biy Buynaksky. In May 1970, Buynaksk was badly damaged by an earthquake.

On 22 December 1997, a group of armed militants led by field commander Ibn al-Khattab raided the military town of the 136th Separate Guards Motor Rifle Brigade in Buynaksk. The attack resulted in a fierce firefight, the destruction of two T-72 tanks, a fuel tanker, and three trucks, while wounding two Russian servicemen.

In 1999, a car bomb outside an apartment building housing the families of military officers killed sixty-four people.

On 13 August 2009, Buynaksk was the site of two attacks associated with the growing violence throughout Dagestan and neighboring Chechnya. About ten men first opened fire with automatic weapons on a police post, killing four officers. The gunmen then entered a nearby sauna complex and killed seven female employees.

Three soldiers were killed, and thirty-two were wounded, in a suicide car-bombing at a military base in the city on September 5, 2010. The driver of a Zhiguli car smashed through a gate at the base and headed for an area where soldiers were quartered in tents. Soldiers opened fire on the car before it reached the center of the base. The driver then rammed the car into a military truck, where it exploded. After the blast, a roadside bomb hit a car taking investigators to the scene, but no injuries were reported in the second explosion. However, attackers claimed killing 56 Russian soldiers by the bombing.

== Administrative and municipal status ==
Within the framework of administrative divisions, Buynaksk serves as the administrative center of Buynaksky District, even though it is not a part of it. As an administrative division, it is incorporated separately as the Town of Buynaksk—an administrative unit with the status equal to that of the districts. As a municipal division, the Town of Buynaksk is incorporated as Buynaksk Urban Okrug.

=== Local government ===
- The Assembly of Deputies of the city district is a representative body of the city district, consisting of 21 deputies. In the 2015 elections, the Russian Veterans' Party received 68.8% of the votes, receiving 17 seats. Four deputies from United Russia also entered the Assembly, gaining 18.5%.
- The head of the city district is elected by the Assembly of Deputies from among its members for a term of office (5 years). The head of the city district exercises the powers of the Chairman of the Assembly of Deputies.
- The administration of the city district is the executive and administrative body of local self-government, headed by the head of the administration, appointed by the Assembly of Deputies under a contract for a period of 5 years.
- Chamber of Control and Accounts of the city district.

== Demographics ==
Ethnic groups (2021 census):

- Avars (39.1%)
- Kumyks (36.7%)
- Laks (7.4%)
- Dargins (6.6%)
- Lezgins (4.6%)
- Russians (2.8%)

== Climate ==
Buynaksk has a humid continental climate (Köppen climate classification: Dfa).

Climate data for Buynaksk, 1991–2020 normals, extremes 1936–present
Month	Jan	Feb	Mar	Apr	May	Jun	Jul	Aug	Sep	Oct	Nov	Dec	Year
Record high °C (°F)	22.3 (72.1)	27.0 (80.6)	31.6 (88.9)	34.3 (93.7)	38.5 (101.3)	39.5 (103.1)	40.4 (104.7)	39.5 (103.1)	39.6 (103.3)	32.3 (90.1)	27.0 (80.6)	28.1 (82.6)	40.4 (104.7)
Mean daily maximum °C (°F)	3.8 (38.8)	4.9 (40.8)	10.0 (50.0)	15.9 (60.6)	22.0 (71.6)	27.2 (81.0)	29.7 (85.5)	29.3 (84.7)	23.6 (74.5)	17.3 (63.1)	10.0 (50.0)	5.6 (42.1)	16.6 (61.9)
Daily mean °C (°F)	−0.6 (30.9)	0.1 (32.2)	4.6 (40.3)	10.2 (50.4)	16.0 (60.8)	20.8 (69.4)	23.3 (73.9)	22.9 (73.2)	17.7 (63.9)	11.8 (53.2)	5.2 (41.4)	1.1 (34.0)	11.1 (52.0)
Mean daily minimum °C (°F)	−3.8 (25.2)	−3.4 (25.9)	0.8 (33.4)	5.7 (42.3)	11.0 (51.8)	15.4 (59.7)	18.0 (64.4)	17.7 (63.9)	13.2 (55.8)	7.7 (45.9)	1.6 (34.9)	−2.2 (28.0)	6.8 (44.3)
Record low °C (°F)	−26.3 (−15.3)	−28.1 (−18.6)	−19.1 (−2.4)	−6.5 (20.3)	−1.4 (29.5)	3.1 (37.6)	9.8 (49.6)	6.7 (44.1)	−2.7 (27.1)	−8.3 (17.1)	−21.1 (−6.0)	−22.1 (−7.8)	−28.1 (−18.6)
Average precipitation mm (inches)	19 (0.7)	22 (0.9)	24 (0.9)	31 (1.2)	61 (2.4)	67 (2.6)	56 (2.2)	50 (2.0)	60 (2.4)	39 (1.5)	30 (1.2)	18 (0.7)	475 (18.7)
Source: Погода и Климат

== Religion ==
- Juma Mosque and Madrasah.
- Dagestan Islamic Institute named after Saifulla Kadi (since 1992).
- Buynaksk Synagogue. In the 1980s, there was a synagogue in Buynaksk, the rabbi of which also served as a shochet, a minyan was held regularly, and there was a Jewish cemetery. In the early 1990s, a Jewish school was opened. The city's synagogue is currently in a state of disrepair and is therefore not used.
- Orthodox Church in honor of St. Grand Duke Alexander Nevsky (military, since 2000)
- In the mid-1860s, the town's prominent Armenian community consisted of over 300 merchants, artisans, and military servicemen who had relocated from places like Georgia, Shusha, Kizlyar, and Mozdok. The Armenian Church of the Holy Mother of God (Surp Astvatsatsin) was a historic Armenian Apostolic church located in Buynaksk which was blessed and consecrated in August 1861 by Archbishop Matevos of the Astrakhan Diocesan Consistory. Its construction was closely linked to General Prince Barseg Bebutov and the patronage of Movses Argutinsky-Dolgorukov. The church was a prominent fixture of the pre-revolutionary cityscape. However, following the rise of Soviet power, intense anti-religious campaigns targeted regional places of worship. The Armenian church was closed down and subsequently destroyed or blown up during the Soviet era.

== See also ==
- Buynaksk Affair
- History of the Jews in Buynaksk
