= Buynaksky District =

Buynaksky District Буйнакский район (Russian)
- District

Other transcription(s)
  - Kumyk: Темирхан-шура якъ
  - Avar: Буйнакъ мухъ
  - Dargwa: Буйнакск къатI
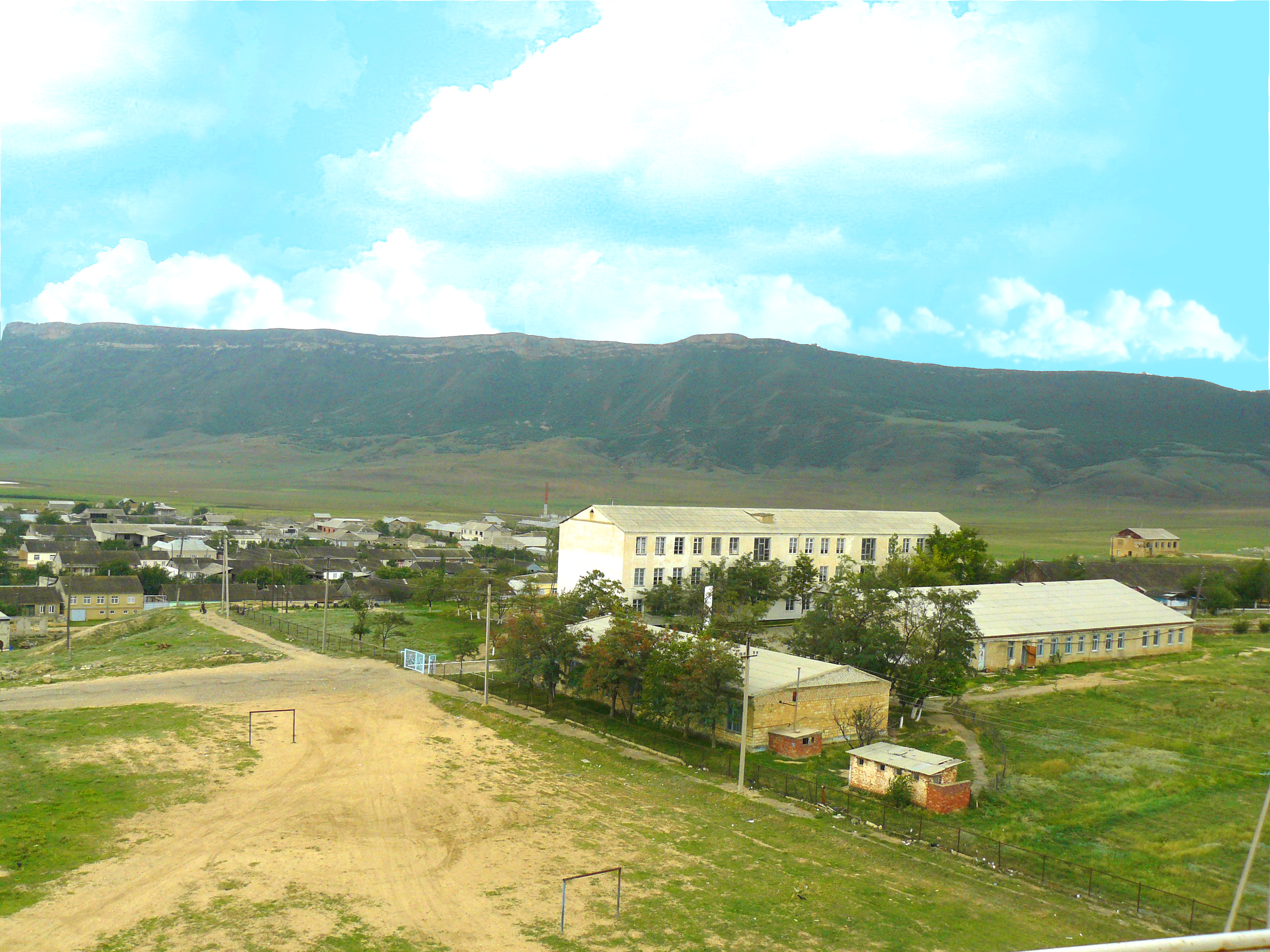
- View of New Kumukh, Buynaksky District

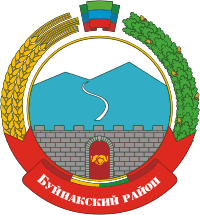
- Coat of arms
- Location of Buynaksky District in the Republic of Dagestan
- Coordinates: 42°49′N 47°07′E
- Country: Russia
- Federal subject: Republic of Dagestan
- Established: 1923
- Administrative center: Buynaksk

Area
  - Total: 1,842.09 km^{2} (711.23 sq mi)

Population (2010 Census)
  - Total: 73,402
  - Density: 39.847/km^{2} (103.20/sq mi)
  - Urban: 0%
  - Rural: 100%

Administrative structure
  - Administrative divisions: 9 Selsoviets
  - Inhabited localities: 30 rural localities

Municipal structure
  - Municipally incorporated as: Buynaksky Municipal District
  - Municipal divisions: 0 urban settlements, 20 rural settlements
- Time zone: UTC+3 (MSK)
- OKTMO ID: 82611000
- Website: http://буйнакскийрайон.рф

Population of Buynaksky District
- 2010 Census: 73,402
- 2002 Census: 65,018
- 1989 Census: 50,094
- 1979 Census: 45,285

Buynaksky District (Russian: Буйнакский район, Kumyk: Шура якъ) is an administrative and municipal district (raion), one of the forty-one in the Republic of Dagestan, Russia. It is located in the center of the republic. The area of the district is 1,842.09 square kilometers (711.23 sq mi). Its administrative center is the town of Buynaksk (which is not administratively a part of the district). As of the 2010 Census, the total population of the district was 73,402.

== Administrative and municipal status ==
Within the framework of administrative divisions, Buynaksky District is one of the forty-one in the republic. It is divided into nine selsoviets, comprising thirty rural localities. The town of Buynaksk serves as its administrative center, despite being incorporated separately as an administrative unit with the status equal to that of the districts.

As a municipal division, the district is incorporated as Buynaksky Municipal District. Its nine selsoviets are incorporated as twenty rural settlements within the municipal district. The Town of Buynaksk is incorporated separately from the district as Buynaksk Urban Okrug, but serves as the administrative center of the municipal district as well.
