= World Congress of Mountain Jews =

International NGO

- Formation: February 7, 2003
- Founder: Zaur Gilalov
- Founded at: Tel Aviv, Israel
- Location: Tirat Carmel, Israel
- Members: Euro-Asian Jewish Congress (EAJC), Federation of Jewish Organizations and Communities – Vaad of Russia, Congress of the Jewish Religious Organizations and Associations in Russia (CJROAR), Russian Foundation for the Preservation and Development of Jewish Culture, Association of Caucasian Jews in Israel, Moscow Jewish religious community (MJRC), Moscow community of mountain Jews Beit Talkhum
- Official language: English, Russian, Hebrew
- Chairman: Akif Gilalov
- Website: http://wcmj.org

World Congress of Mountain Jews (WCMJ) is an active, international non-governmental organization that provides opportunities for Mountain Jews, who are dispersed worldwide. WCMJ seeks to bring together the Mountain Jew population to maintain and share traditions and cultural values through cooperation with international society. The organisation plays an integral cultural role for Mountain Jews globally, through official representation of their interests – which includes engagement with governmental and social bodies. It brings together the mountain Jews of Israel, United States, Russia, Canada, Azerbaijan, Germany, Austria, Georgia, Kazakhstan, and other countries.

Since 2017, the WCMJ has a separated consulting statute at the United Nations Economic and Social Council (ECOSOC).

== History ==
In 1996, the Moscow-based philanthropist Tair Ghilalovich Gurshumov established the foundation for the preservation and development of the mountain-Jewish culture and laid the first stone for the construction of a synagogue in Tirat Carmel, Israel. He decided to build a synagogue in honor of his mother Mirvori bat Hastil, but was unable to complete it before his own death. In memory of him, his sons Zaur and Akif Gilalov created an international fund for the preservation and development of mountain-Jewish culture and built a synagogue, naming it "Beit Talhum", after their father. On the eve of the congress, a synagogue was opened with the introduction of the Torah Scrolls. The guests of honor were the mayor of Tirat Carmel, the former Sephardi Chief Rabbi of Israel, Eliyahu Bakshi-Doron, and the delegates to the congress.

WCMJ was established at the first constituent congress, held on 5–7 February 2003 in Tel Aviv, Israel, by businessman and public figure Zaur Gilalov, who made significant efforts to rally the mountain Jews communities around the world, continuing the work of his father.

The WCMJ's founders include: the Euro-Asian Jewish Congress (EAJC), the Federation of Jewish Organizations and Communities – Vaad of Russia, the Congress of the Jewish Religious Organizations and Associations in Russia (CJROAR), the Russian Foundation for the Preservation and Development of Jewish Culture, the Association of Caucasian Jews in Israel, the Moscow Jewish religious community (MJRC), the Moscow community of mountain Jews "Beit Talkhum", the community of mountain Jews of Pyatigorsk, Nalchik and Derbent (Russia), Baku and Quba (Azerbaijan), New York and Toronto, and other Jewish organizations.

In November 2003, Zaur Gilalov, having the mandate of the President of the WCMJ, made his first official visit to the White House and met with representatives of the American administration and with the President of the Council of the Largest Jewish Organizations of America, Ronald Lauder.

On March 5, Zaur Gilalov was killed in Moscow. After his brother's death, Akif Gilalov became chairman.

=== Mission ===
The mission of the Congress is to strengthen the links among the mountain Jews living in different countries and with all nations and progressive social organizations interested in strengthening peace, tolerance, progress, and cultural and humanitarian development.

=== Goals ===
The WCMJ's declared objective is to establish a single organization under the auspices of which its interests can be declared to the world.

== Activity ==
On November 13, 2003, Zaur Gilalov chaired the meeting of the Board of the WCMJ in New York. Members of the New York Mountain Jew Community – Iacov Abramov, Robert Azariev, Liuba Iusufova, the editor of the city's community newspaper "New Frontier" Norbert Evdaev, the Rabbi Yosef Elyashev, businessman Mikhail Davydov – reported on the work of the regional American branch. The religious part of New York's Mountain Jew Community built its own synagogue. For the first time in the history of the US mountain Jew community, Erik Yavdaev, a UN official, organized the release of a community calendar, taking into account the traditions of the mountain Jews. On behalf of the World Forum of Russian-Speaking Jewry (WFRJ), whose co-founders were a number of mountain-Jew organizations from different countries, the Chairman Zaur Gilalov and the participants of the meeting were welcomed by Mikhail Nemirovsky, chairman of the WCMJ's coordinating council. With the WFRJ's support, the International Conference of the Mountain Rabbis (ICMR) was established. The first (founding) congress of the ICMR was held on July 20–24, 2003 in Jerusalem at the Sheraton Jerusalem Plaza hotel. Among the nearly 150 congress participants were not only the well-known rabbis of Israel – Rav Yitzchak Zilber, Rav Shmuel Oerbah, Rav Yaakov Sofer, Rav Elbaz, Rav Bakshi Doron, Rav Yona Metzger, but also young rabbis, yeshiva students and representatives of Russian, Azerbaijan, Kazakhstan, USA, Israel and Georgia communities.

On January 22, 2004, under the auspices of the WFRJ, a conference was held at Bar-Ilan University in Tel Aviv, which was attended by the same people who were at the first congress. Organizational work was led by the chairman of the international relations committee of the WCMJ and by the representative of the Israel Caucasian Jews Forum, Yakov Bar-Shimon. The Sephardi Chief Rabbi of Israel, Shlomo Amar, spoke at the conference.

On November 23, 2017, a reception was held at the UN Information Center in Moscow, dedicated to the special consultative statute achieved at the UN Economic and Social Council by the WFRJ. As a result, the WFRJ gained international recognition, entering a new stage of its development and thereby gaining the opportunity to participate at the international level in the discussion on such relevant topics as respect for human rights and freedoms.

On February 19, 2018, in Jerusalem, an official meeting was held between the Prime Minister of Israel, Benjamin Netanyahu, and the head of the WFRJ, Akif Gilalov. The meeting was dedicated mainly to the activities of the Congress and its further development. The construction in Moscow of the Cultural and Community Center of Sephardic Jews of Russia was also discussed. At the same time, official meetings were held with the Chairman of the Knesset (Israeli Parliament), Yuli Edelstein, and the Minister for Jerusalem's Affairs, Ze'ev Elkin, where the WFRJ's activities were also discussed.

On October 9, 2018, an evening dedicated to the presentation of the book "History and Culture of Mountain Jews" was held in the building of the Moscow Government, with the assistance of the World Congress of Mountain Jews (WCMJ) and the Federal Agency for Nationalities Affairs.

On November 5, 2018, at the Vatican, Pope Francis held a personal meeting with the WCRJ's delegation headed by Akif Tairovich Gilalov. As reported, the pontiff supported and blessed the initiative of convening the Council of the Heads of Monoreligions, which was proposed by Akif Tairovich Gilalov, the head of the WCMJ.

On November 19, 2018, the ceremony of the "Person of the Year 2018" awards was held in Jerusalem. The event was organized by WCMJ together with the All-Israel Association of Mountain Jews.

On December 13, 2018, a WCMJ presentation was held at the United Nations headquarters in New York, USA. The participants, representatives of the world mountain-Jewish community, international Jewish societies, members of the US Congress and of the American establishment, were presented as a gift the book "Mountain Jews", a fundamental study on the 600 years development of the history and culture of the Mountain Jews.

== Cooperation ==
On May 23, 2018, Eric Solheim, Executive Director of the United Nations Environment Program (UNEP), and Akif Gilalov, head of the WCMJ and owner of the Russian Fairs company, signed a Memorandum of Understanding aimed at promoting sustainable consumption and production and sustainable living and the development of industrial and agricultural fairs in 85 regions of Russia. The signing ceremony of the memorandum was held at the UN House in Moscow.

On May 27, 2019, Bruno Pozzi, Director of the European Office of the UNEP, and Akif Gilalov, Head of the WCMJ, signed a Memorandum of Understanding aimed at implementing the Sustainable Development Goals (SDGs). The UN, in particular, in the areas of quality education, sustainable consumption and production, helping to build a peaceful and open society for sustainable development and creation of effective, accountable and participatory institutions at all levels and building partnerships for sustainable development.

== See also ==
- History of the Jews in Azerbaijan
- Qırmızı Qəsəbə
- Mountain Jews in Israel
