= History of the Jews in Nalchik =

Nalchik Jews
יהודי נלצ'יק Нальчикские евреи
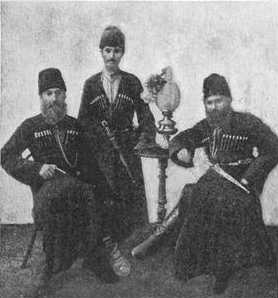

Total population
- 500–600

Languages
- Hebrew (in Israel), Judeo-Tat, Russian

Religion
- Judaism

Related ethnic groups
- Mountain Jews, Ashkenazi Jews.

The Jewish community in Nalchik consists of Jews who have lived in the territory of modern-day Nalchik, a city in Kabardino-Balkaria. This community is one of the oldest in the North Caucasus, Russia. Jews settled here as early as the beginning of the 19th century, with most of the first settlers coming from Zasulak Kumykia, part of modern-day Dagestan. By the mid-19th century, Mountain Jews were concentrated in the Jewish Quarter, near the Nalchik fortress, not far from the city center. In the 19th century, Nalchik had two synagogues, the first of which opened in 1848. In the years following the Russian Revolution of 1917, Jewish organizations actively developed in the city, and even a newspaper was published. Mountain Jews received autonomy, which was liquidated in 1938.

== History ==
The so-called Jewish Quarter was founded by Mountain Jews who settled in 1847-1848, two miles from the fortress. Before Russian rule in the Caucasus, Mountain Jews lived in the village of Endirey, located on the Kumyk plain in Dagestan. In 1831, after an attack on the village of Kazi-Mulla, Jews moved to the village of the Kabardian prince Alexander Bekovich-Cherkassky. However, they were forced to leave again when Imam Shamil invaded Kabardia. They went to Mozdok, but due to a cholera epidemic, they left the city and moved to Nalchik.

In the first half of the 19th century, Jews began to settle in the suburbs of Nalchik. By the mid-19th century, Mountain Jews were concentrated in the so-called Jewish Quarter. In 1848, a synagogue was opened, and a house was purchased for it in 1868. Yagya Kudaneev was the rabbi of Nalchik in the 1850s, and Geshey Amirov in the 1860s.

Some facts from the life of the Jews of Nalchik:

- In 1866, 74 Jewish families lived in Nalchik.
- In 1886, there were 335 Jews
- In 1897, there were 1,040 Jews, making up 32.4% of the city’s total population.
- In 1908, there were 1,307 Mountain Jews.
- In 1926, there were 1,458 Jews, comprising 11.3% of the city’s total population.
- In 1939, there were 3,007 Jews.
- In 1959, there were 2,168 Mountain Jews, accounting for 2.5% of the city’s total population.
- In 1970, there were 5,171 Jews, including 2,581 Mountain Jews and 2 Krymchaks.
- In 1979, there were 2,851 Jews, making up 1.4% of the city’s total population.
- In 2002, there were 955 Jews.

In the sphere of economic activity of the Jews of Nalchik in the second half of the 19th century, trade and crafts predominated, mainly tanning leather. At the end of the 19th century, there were two synagogues in Nalchik. In 1902, an attempt was made to create a school for Mountain Jews in Nalchik. In the 1910s, three cheders operated in Nalchik. In 1914, Jews owned 11 shops and stores, including a jewelry store, two leather goods stores, two textile stores, and the only tableware store. The rabbi of Nalchik in the late 19th to early 20th centuries was Khazkiyagu Abramovich Amirov (1855–?), in the 1910s Itzhak Gilyadov (?–1918), and from 1918 to 1923, the rabbi was S.R. Shaulov (1880–?). In 1918, the deputy chief of the militia created by the local population was Khanaan Efraimov.

In the summer of 1920, a Jewish Caucasian unit was formed in Nalchik to be sent to the front “for protection against pogroms organized by the Poles.” Since 1921, a branch of the Evkommol was operating. In the early 1920s, Zionist organizations, including a Poale Zion branch, were active in Nalchik.

In 1925, the Jewish quarter of Nalchik was separated into a department of the administrative district within the city. That same year, a school for Mountain Jews operated in Nalchik. The director was Kamuil Isaakovich Gilyadov; in 1923, K. I. Gilyadov prepared and published an alphabet book in Nalchik in the language of Mountain Jews, using the Hebrew alphabet. In 1927, a neighborhood council was elected, which was liquidated in 1938, and included Jews – a policeman and a paramedic. That same year, Jewish cooperatives of shoemakers and leather tanners were created. Since 1928, a branch of OZET operated in Nalchik.

In the late 1920s, 57% of Nalchik’s Mountain Jews were engaged in agriculture. In the 1930s, Nalchik’s Jews began to move to other areas of the city. Rabbi Nehemiah was the rabbi of Nalchik during these years. From 1924 to 1931, one of the four languages in which the newspaper "Red Kabarda" was published was the language of the Mountain Jews.

On October 28, 1942, Nalchik was occupied by Wehrmacht units. From November 1942 to early January 1943, there was an "open" ghetto in Nalchik, where several thousand people were located. Mountain Jews lived compactly in a special district, where local Jews from other areas of the city moved after the occupation.

In early November 1942, several dozen Ashkenazi Jews (including evacuees) and 10 Mountain Jews were killed in Nalchik as "Soviet activists." After the registration of Jews, some of their property was confiscated. Jews were ordered to wear six-pointed stars; after negotiations between representatives of the Mountain Jewish community and local authorities, the order was canceled on December 16, 1942. A "national council of Tats" was organized under the national council created by the occupation authorities, which included 15 people. Nalchik was liberated on January 4, 1943.

In 1945, the previously closed synagogue at 79 Podgornaya Street in Nalchik resumed operations. On normal days, 35–45 people attended the synagogue, and on holidays, 350 to 450 people. The rabbis were S. R. Shaulov and Shamulya Khazkeevich Amirov (1880–?). The duties of shochet and mohel were performed by Rabbi Nakhamshiya Khazkeevich Amirov (1882–1968), the son of Kh. A. Amirov.

In 1947, the teaching of the Judeo-Tat language in schools ceased. In the 1940s and 1950s, most of the Mountain Jews in Nalchik were employed in the clothing and shoe industries.

In 1959, the vocal and instrumental "Mountain Jews Ensemble" was created at the shoe factory. It was later renamed the "Judeo-Tat Folk Vocal and Musical Ensemble" under the direction of Viktor Shabaev. Since 1988, the socio-political center "Tovushi" (Light), founded by Svetlana Aronovna Danilova (b. 1940), the granddaughter of educator Kamuil Isaakovich Gilyadov, has been operating in Nalchik. The music school "Shulamit," directed by Nina Kardailskaya, was opened, along with the Hebrew school "Mekhina" and a kindergarten. In 1990, a new synagogue was built in Nalchik. Since then, a Jewish school has been operating. The community center also houses an ulpan, a library, and youth clubs.

Since 1993, the newspaper Jews of the North Caucasus has been published, edited by Mikhail Zavelevich Iofin. In the mid-1990s, a Jewish comprehensive school began operating. In the 1990s, the rabbi of Nalchik was Ovshalum Ilkhanovich Shamilov (1942–1996).

However, with the collapse of the USSR, the situation changed. The criminal situation and low standard of living led to a mass exodus from the Jewish Quarter, forcing many to move to other cities in Russia and abroad, including Israel, the US, and Europe. Many were compelled to leave the city due to lawlessness and rampant crime.

In the early 2000s, the departure of Jews from Nalchik stopped, and those troubled times passed, leading to a generally stable situation. The Jewish Quarter remains one of the unique traditional places of compact residence for Mountain Jews. In 2008, about 2,000 people lived in Nalchik.

Since 2000, the chairman of the Jewish community has been Boris Sherbetovich Izgiyaev (b. 1938). In 2005, M. M. Shneerson Levi Shabaev (b. 1970) became the chairman of the Jewish community. From 2005 to 2006, the chairman of the religious community was Gersil Rubinovich Rubinov (b. 1946). In 2005, about 2,500 Jews lived in Nalchik.

== Notable Mountain Jews of Nalchik ==
- Efrem Amiramov (1956-2025), Soviet/Russian singer, poet, composer, songwriter, television producer.
- Tanakhum Ashurov (1894–1964), a self-taught musician, collector and performer of folk music of the peoples of the North Caucasus. Honored Artist of the RSFSR (1957). People's Artist of the Kabardino-Balkarian ASSR (1953).
- Ilya Ilyagumovich Davydov (b. 1932), painter.
- Isai Illazarov (1920–1944), a World War II veteran. Hero of the Soviet Union (1945).
- Vladimir Kirshon (1902–1938),a Soviet playwright, poet, publicist and screenwriter.
- David Avigadulovich Shabaev (b. 1922), historian, archaeographer, poet, publicist.
- Semyon "Shimriil" Shabaev Sodugovich (1892–1976), dancer, choreographer.
- Vladimir Moiseevich Shabaev (b. 1959), physicist, Doctor of Sciences in Physical and Mathematical Sciences (1992), professor at Saint Petersburg State University (1998), specialist in quantum mechanics.

== See also ==
- Judeo-Tat
- Judeo-Tat literature
- Judeo-Tat Theatre
- Mountain Jews
