= Museum of Mountain Jews =

Museum in Guba, Azerbaijan

Coordinates: 41°22′03″N 48°30′35″E

- Azerbaijani: Dağ Yəhudiləri Muzeyi
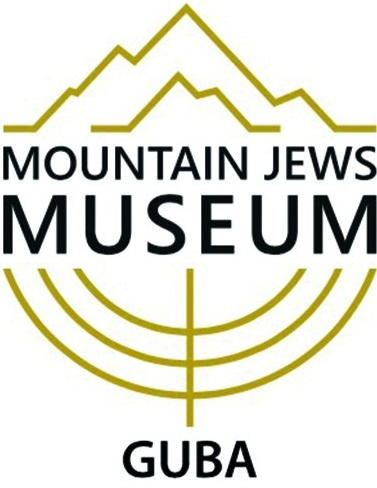

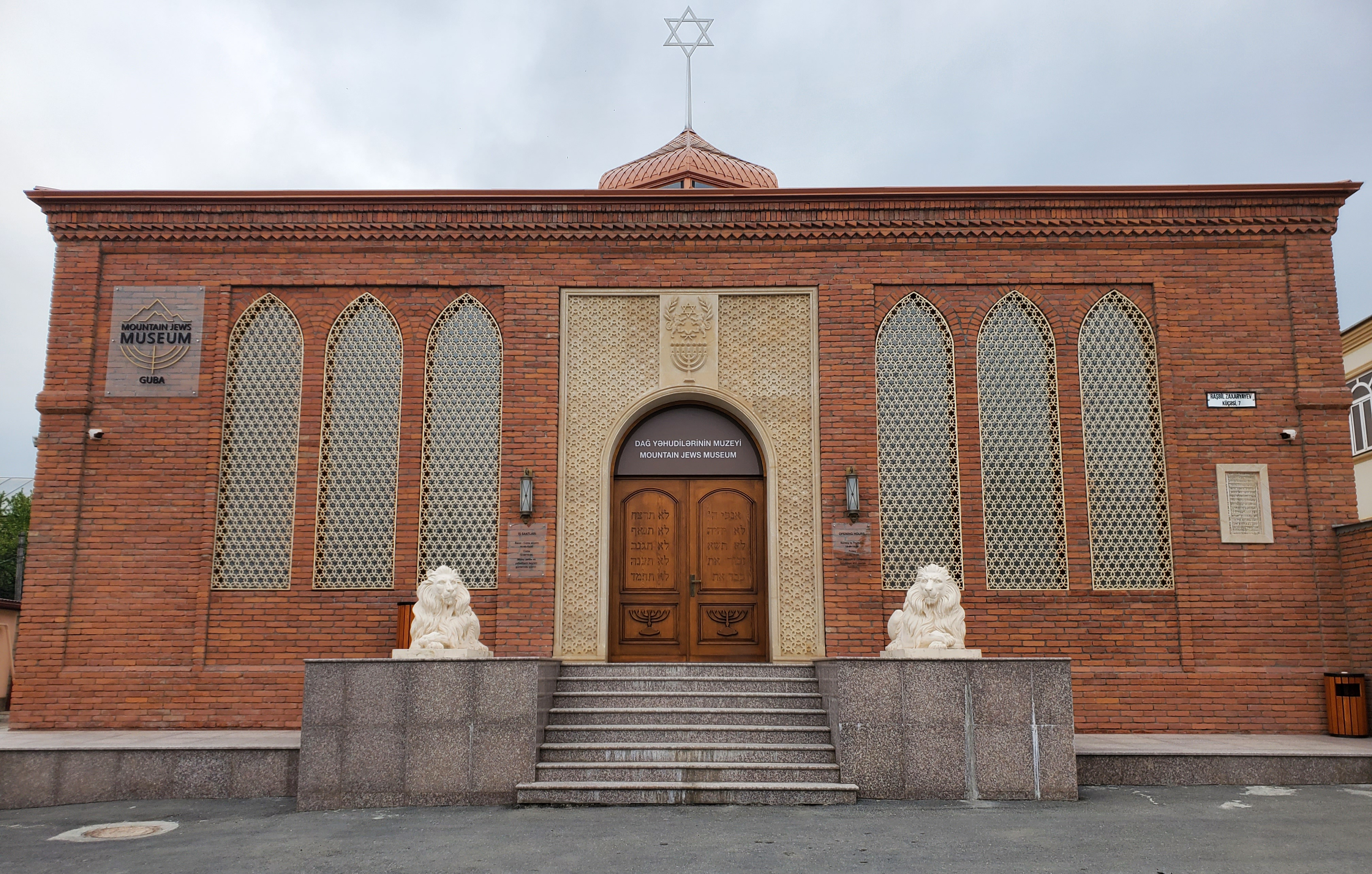
- Established: 2020
- Location: Rashbil Zakharyayev st. 7, Qırmızı Qəsəbə, Quba, Azerbaijan
- Website: https://jewish-museum.az/

The Museum of Mountain Jews (Azerbaijani: Dağ Yəhudiləri Muzeyi) is a museum in Guba, Azerbaijan, dedicated to Mountain Jews. Opened in 2020, it is located in the 19th-century Karchog Synagogue. It is the first and only museum in the world devoted to Mountain Jews.

== History of the building ==
The museum is located in the 19 th century Karchog synagogue in the Gyrmyzy Gasaba. A warehouse of agricultural products was located here. After the collapse of the Soviet Union, the synagogue was left empty. The synagogue, which remained for years, fell into disrepair. Later, major restoration works were carried out here. The building has a room height of more than 5 meters and is square in shape. A second floor has been added to much of the building to explore more exhibits here. In the basement of the building, a conference hall, a library, and a room for reserve exhibits had been made.

== Founding the museum ==
The idea of establishing the Museum of Mountain Jews came up in 2017. Karchog Synagogue, which had been abandoned for many years, was chosen for the administrative building of the museum. The old synagogue was restored. Russian businessmen God Nisanov, Zarakh Iliev, German Zakharyayev supported the construction of the museum. In addition, the "STMEQI" foundation took on the responsibility of providing the museum with exhibits. This foundation is the largest organization uniting Mountain Jews in the world. During the preparation of the museum, the foundation called upon the diaspora and communities to find the ancient artifacts.

== Exhibition ==
There are exhibits on the traditions, general history, occupations, history of the Mountain Jews living in Gyrmyzy Gasaba. There is a corner with the name of the rabbis who worked in the Caucasus throughout the period and also a corner designated to the National Hero of Azerbaijan Albert Agarunov. There is his medal in the corner dedicated to Albert Agarunov.

== Gallery ==
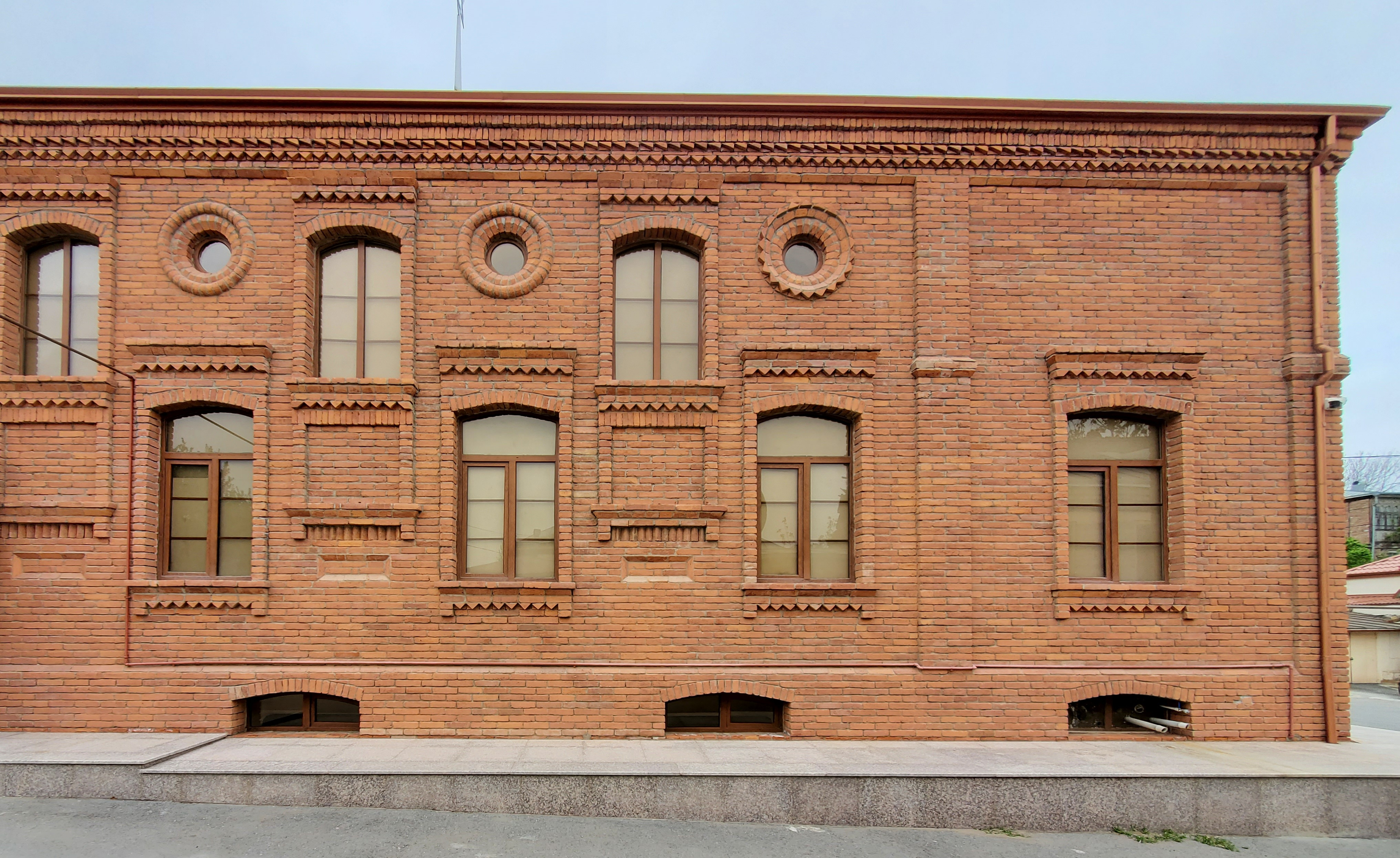

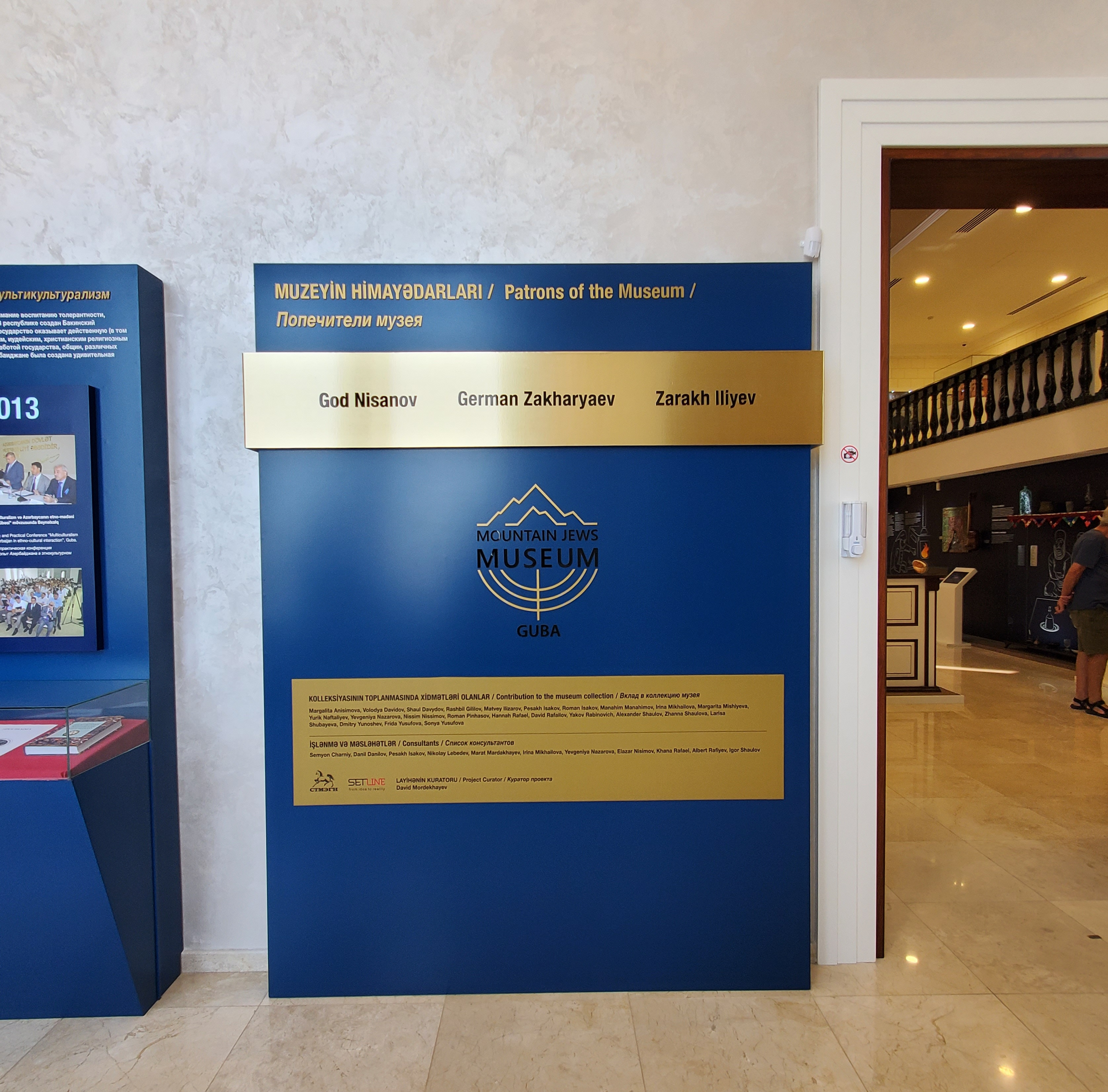

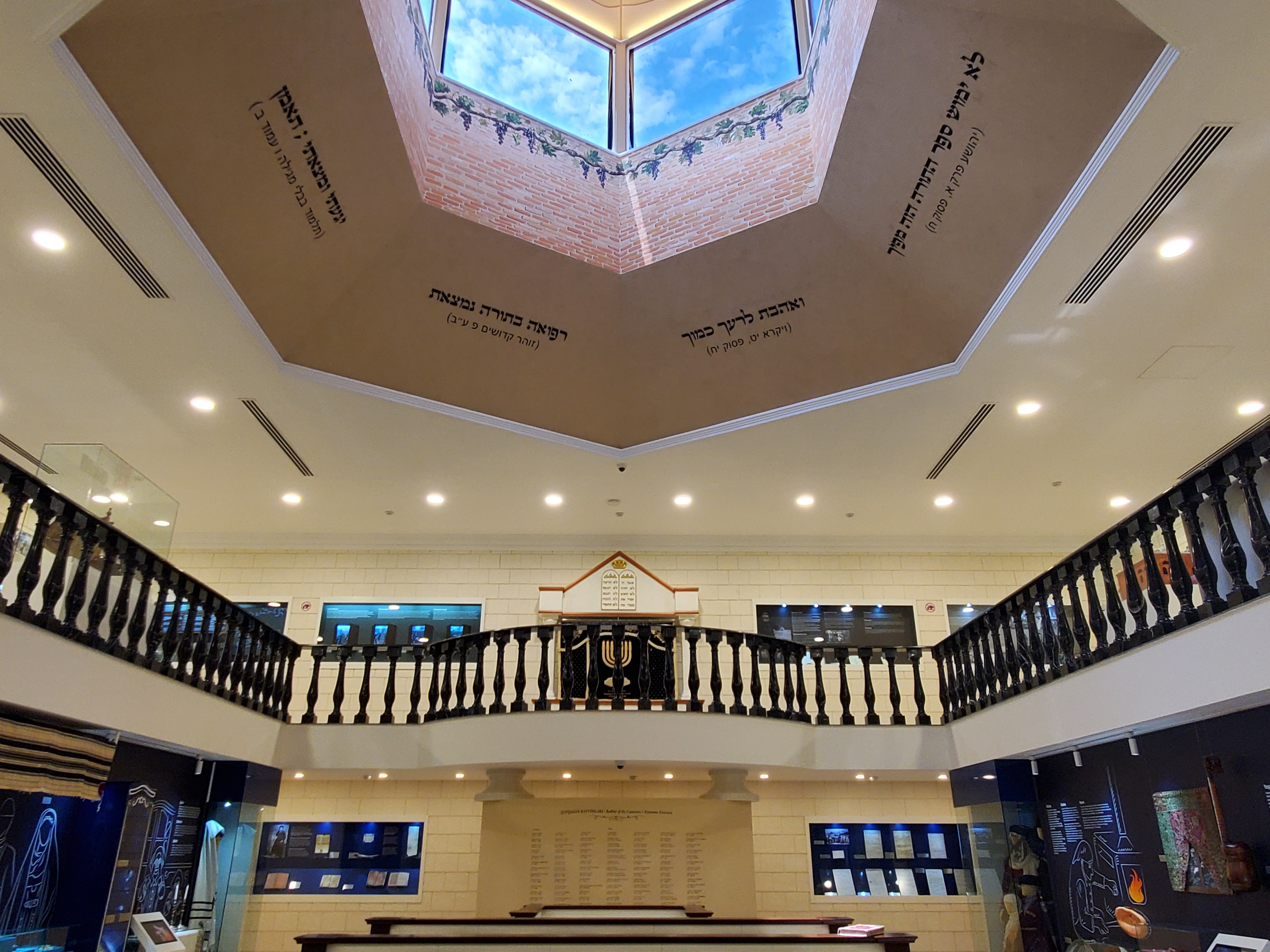

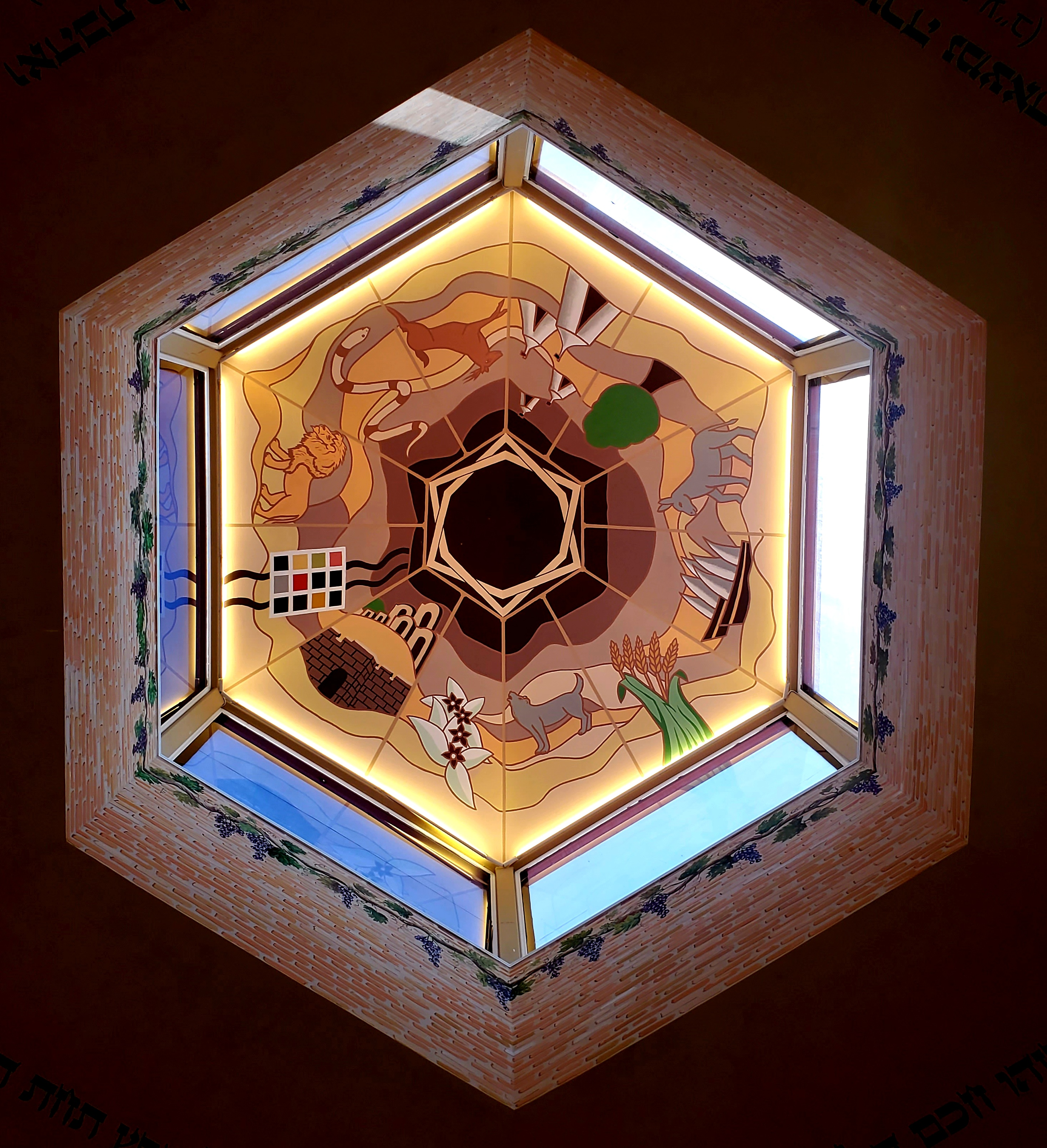

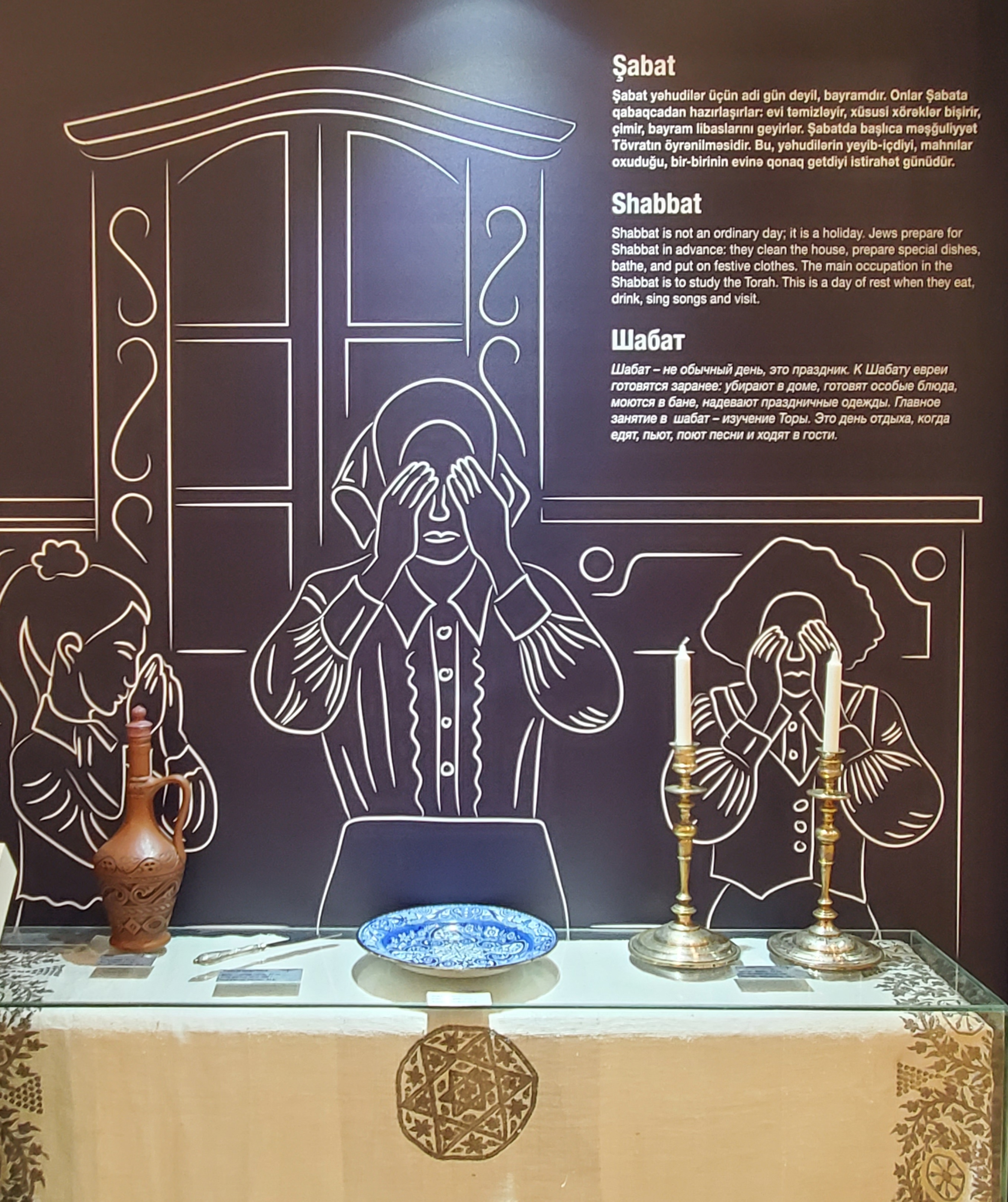

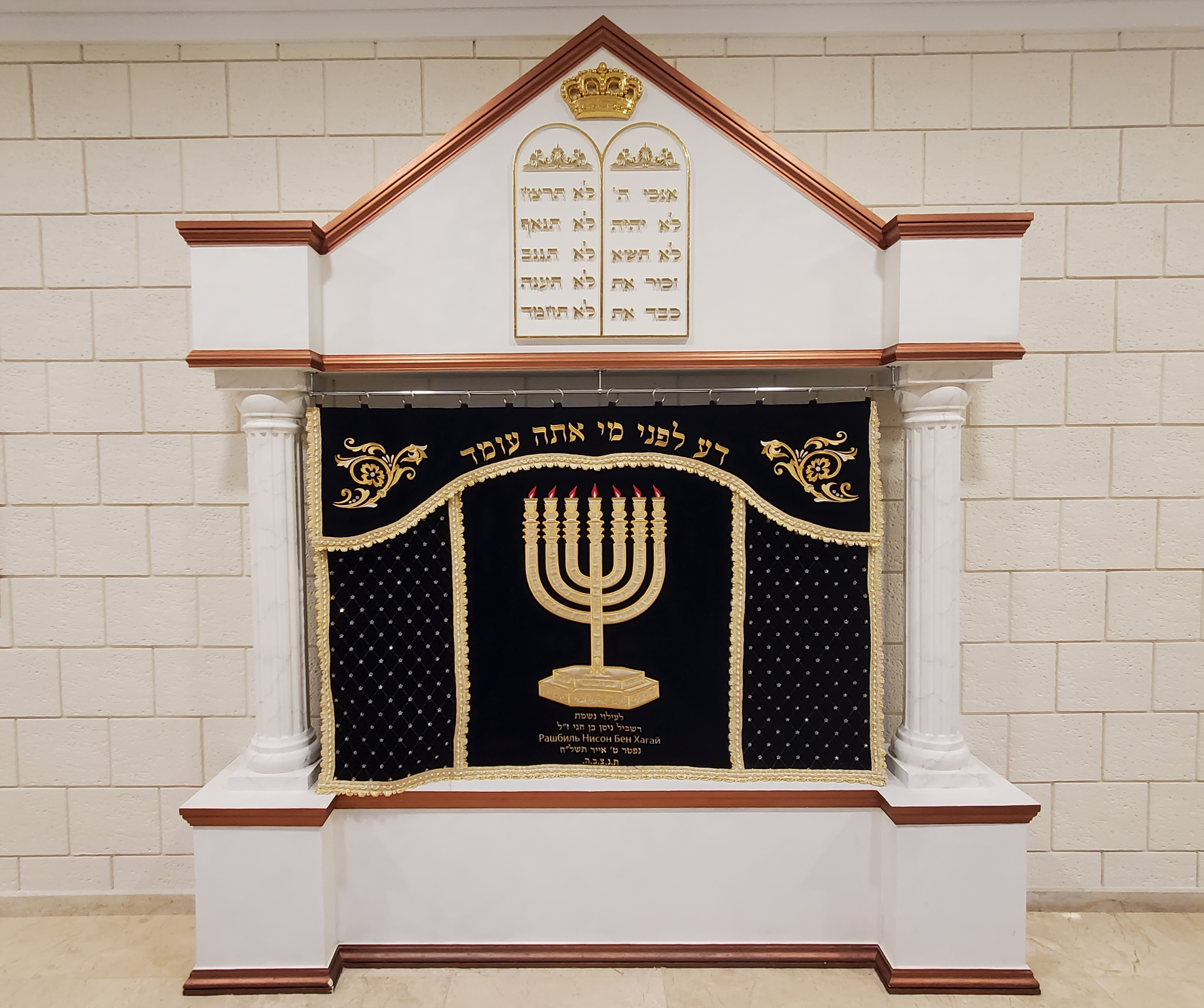

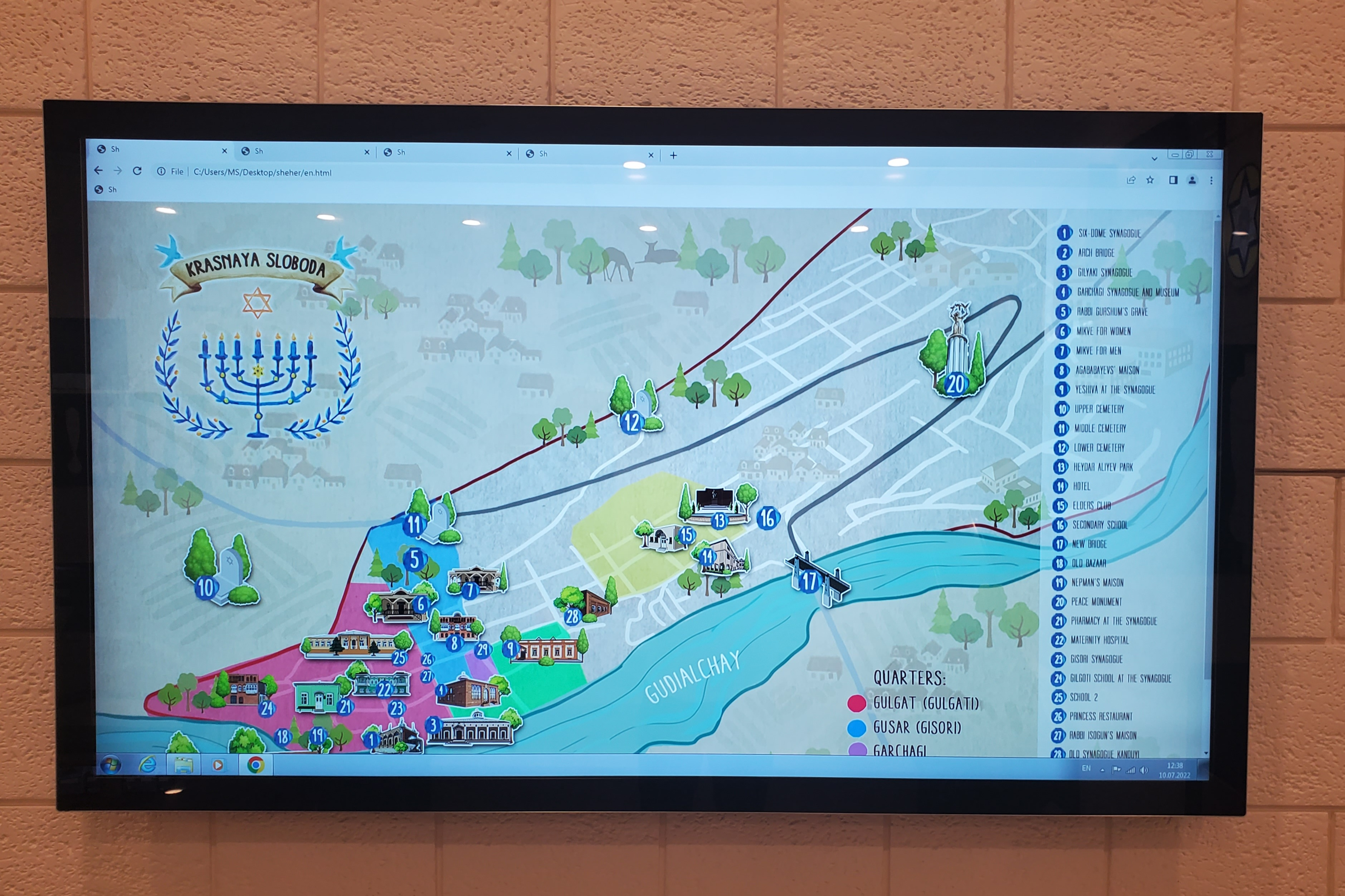
