= Govgil =

Part of the Passover celebration by Mountain Jews

Govgil (Hebrew: (גבגיל) גובגיל) (an abbreviation for גבלה גאולה, "govleh geulah"; Juhuri: govlei geulya, "end/verge/completion of (the celebration of) the redemption") is a celebration of the Mountain Jews next day after the end of the celebration of Pesach (Passover), i.e., on the eighth day after the beginning of Pesach.

== See also ==
- Mimouna
- Yad#Mountain Jews
