= History of the Jews in Kislovodsk =

Kislovodsk Jews
יהודי קיסלובודסק Кисловодские евреи
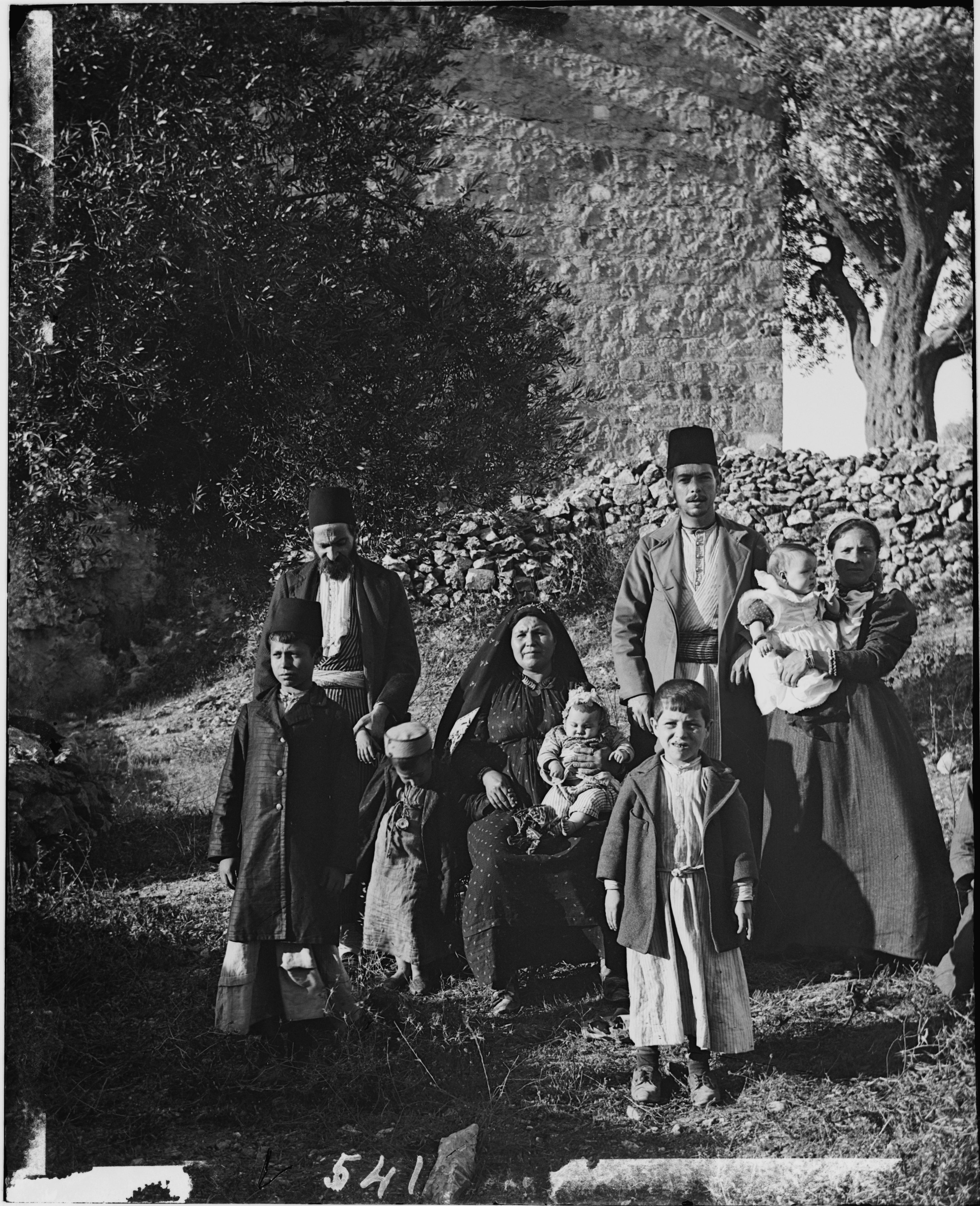

Total population
- 200–250

Languages
- Hebrew (in Israel), Judeo-Tat, Russian

Religion
- Judaism

Related ethnic groups
- Ashkenazi Jews, Mountain Jews.

The Jewish community in Kislovodsk consists of Jews who have lived in the territory of modern-day Kislovodsk, a city in Stavropol Krai, in the North Caucasus region of Russia. Kislovodsk was one of the cities in the North Caucasus with a significant Jewish population. In 1890, a synagogue and a rabbi’s house were opened on Kuibyshev Street in Kislovodsk, but these were later requisitioned by the Soviet authorities. According to the 1912 census, 16 people of Jewish nationality lived in Kislovodsk—6 women and 10 men. The total population as of January 1 that year was 13,758. Some believe these figures were clearly underestimated, as there were two prayer houses and two Jewish cemeteries operating in Kislovodsk at the time.

== History ==
Until 1917, a rabbi and his family lived in Kislovodsk, and community meetings were held in his house. Today, this building is recognized as a cultural and architectural monument of the early 20th century, known as the "Rabbi's House".

After the October Revolution, intensive construction of a health resort complex took place in the 1920s and 1930s. The Soviet government did not hinder the emergence of highly qualified Jewish specialists in Kislovodsk. By 1926, 640 Jews lived in Kislovodsk, making up 2% of the city’s total population. By 1939, the Jewish population had increased to 766.

In 1913, Jews owned a kerosene shop and two ready-made clothing shops in Kislovodsk. In the 1920s, there was a community of Mountain Jews in the city. The shochets in Kislovodsk during the 1920s and 1930s were Lubavitch Hasidim: Aryeh-Leib Gorelik (1888–?), who died during the Holocaust, and Yosef Gurfinkel, who died in exile in Fergana. In 1929, the board of the city branch of OZET published the newspaper “Voice of OZET.”

In 1936, the synagogue was closed. Later, the synagogue buildings were repurposed for shops, a drug addiction clinic, and various Soviet organizations.

In August 1942, after the city was occupied by the Wehrmacht, a Judenrat was established in Kislovodsk, headed by Moisei Samoylovich Beninson (1878–?). On August 18, 1942, the registration of the entire Jewish population was announced. Jews aged 16 to 60 were sent to forced labor and required to wear a yellow Star of David on their chest. On September 7, 1942, about 2,000 Jews were deported from Kislovodsk to Mineralnye Vody, where they were shot along with Jews from Yessentuki and Pyatigorsk. In total, about 6,300 people were killed.

After September 9, 1942, a raid was conducted on the surviving Jews. Some local residents in Kislovodsk hid Jewish families and helped them secretly escape to the mountains.

Following the mass shooting of Jews in Mineralnye Vody, another 323 people were executed at Koltso-Gora in the vicinity of Kislovodsk.

In 1948, a petition from Jewish believers to open a synagogue in Kislovodsk was rejected. That same year, the Committee for the Support of the State of Israel was established. The members of this committee were subsequently repressed, forcing Jewish life in the city to go underground. The Jewish community was also affected by the infamous "Doctors' plot."

In the 1980s and 1990s, Mountain Jews increasingly moved to Kislovodsk from Derbent, Makhachkala, Khasavyurt, Nalchik, and Grozny.

In 2000, a religious community was established in Kislovodsk, led by Victoria Mikhailovna Lanovaya (b. 1947).

By 2002, about 1,500 Jews lived in Kislovodsk.

Since November 2003, a Hebrew school for children has been operating in the community, where they study Hebrew, as well as the history and traditions of the Jewish people. The community also actively runs youth and family clubs. In 2009, Tatyana Viktorovna Yakubovskaya became the chairperson of the community.

In 2017, a monument was erected at the site of the execution of Jews during the Holocaust.

In 2019, the synagogue, which had been requisitioned during the Soviet era, was returned to the community. The Jewish community in Kislovodsk appointed Akiva Khudainatov as the rabbi of the synagogue.

== See also ==
- History of the Jews in Russia
- Ashkenazi Jews
- Mountain Jews
