= Day of Salvation and Liberation =

Jewish holiday

- Official name: יום השחרור וההצלה; English translation: Day of Salvation and Liberation
- Also called: 26th Iyar
- Observed by: Jews
- Type: Jewish
- Significance: The saving of the Jewish people from annihilation at the hands of Nazi Germany.
- Celebrations: Lighting three candles. Prayer services at synagogue or at home.
- Begins: 26 Iyar
- 2025 date: Sunset, 23 May – nightfall, 24 May
- 2026 date: Sunset, 12 May – nightfall, 13 May
- 2027 date: Sunset, 1 June – nightfall, 2 June
- 2028 date: Sunset, 21 May – nightfall, 22 May
- Related to: Hanukkah, Purim., as a rabbinically decreed holiday.

Day of Salvation and Liberation (Hebrew: יוֹם השִחרוּר וההַצָלָה) is a Jewish holiday celebrated on the 26th day of the month Iyar, which commemorates the victory of Allies against Nazi Germany and the saving of the Jewish people from annihilation at the hands of Nazi Germany.

While commemorating the same historical events, the sacred religious meaning of the Day of Salvation and Liberation makes it distinct from other established non-religious (secular) holidays which commemorate the surrender of Nazi Germany. Those are traditionally celebrated on the 8th of May across European nations as Victory in Europe Day, on the 9th of May across Russia, several former USSR and Eastern Europe states as Victory Day and on the 9th of May across Israel as a Victory in Europe Day.

== The Date ==
The dates for Jewish Holidays are solely determined by the Hebrew Calendar. Thus, according to beliefs of the Maharal of Prague, regarded as one of the most influential figures in Halakha, the Jewish religious laws, every year, on the same day, the same spiritual act is revealed from Heaven. Therefore, when someone commemorates events per the Hebrew Calendar, they commemorate it on "that exact day". The 9th of May 1945 in the Gregorian calendar is equivalent to the 26 Iyar of the year 5705 in the Hebrew Calendar.

== The Holiday foundation ==
In 2013, German Zakharyayev, a vice-president of the Russian Jewish Congress, presented the concept of the celebration of Victory Day as a religious Jewish holiday. The initiative was supported by leading Jewish organisations and rabbis. Consequently, the Chief Rabbinate of Russia determined a list of prayers to be for the 26 Iyar and, for the first time in history, the commemoration prayer services were held in synagogues across Russia, Europe, and Israel.

German Zakharyayev's initiative received further support at the Conference of European Rabbis, and from the Chief Rabbinate of Israel. In Hebrew Calendar year 5774 (Gregorian calendar year 2014), the first commemoration events, dedicated to the Day of Salvation and Liberation took place in Knesset, at the Western Wall, and in the Headquarters of the United Nations. As a gesture of further support, another related program was initiated that year – the project aimed to search and recover graves of approximately 250,000 Jewish people, members of both regular and irregular Allied military forces who gave their lives fighting against Nazi Germany.

In May 2015, in Toulouse, France, the Conference of European Rabbis signed the Declaration proclaiming the 26th day of the month Iyyar, as a new religious commemorative date in Hebrew Calendar - the Day of Salvation and Liberation. Furthermore, to commemorate the 70th anniversary of Nazi Germany's capitulation, three Torah scrolls were written and presented in the Knesset, at the Western Wall, and in the rabbi Chaim Kanievsky's yeshiva. Additional ceremonies in honor of the Day of Salvation and Liberation were held in Toulouse and Moscow.

In 2018, the Day of Salvation and Liberation was made into law by the Knesset. In 2020, about 150 Chief Rabbis and presidents of rabbinical courts from twenty countries, including Russia, Italy, Germany, Austria, Poland, France, United Kingdom, USA, Switzerland, Belarus, Ukraine, Moldova, Bulgaria, Belgium, Tunisia, and Turkey, joined a prayer at the Western Wall. They were also joined by the representatives from the White House, U.S. Commission for the Preservation of America's Heritage Abroad, Presidential Administration of Russia, Israel's ambassadors to the U.N. and Russia, and the heads of Jewish organisations from around the world. Official greetings from the President of the United States and the Russian President were shared with the gathering.

In 2022, the Day of Salvation and Liberation commemoration events took place in the headquarters of the Council of Europe in Strasbourg, France.

== Religious significance and meaning ==
German Zakharyayev originally proclaimed the sacred meaning of the Day of Salvation and Liberation, that this is not a secular holiday, nor is it politically motivated; it is, instead, a sacred occasion. When the concept of the Day of Salvation and Liberation first came to mind, he recognised that support should be sought from Jewish communities worldwide, rather than from governmental bodies. This day is dedicated to expressing gratitude — a solemn and significant gesture by the Jewish people to honor the soldiers of the Red Army and the Allied coalition and to offer thanks to God for the miraculous deliverance of the Jewish people from the threat of complete annihilation.

It was not without controversy amongst Jewish religious leaders initially on the Day of Salvation and Liberation status. Berel Lazar – a Chief Rabbi of Russia:

Мы позитивно относимся к предложению увековечить 9 мая как День памяти и благодарности, но это не праздник.

We welcome the initiative to proclaim the 9th of May Victory Day as a Day of Commemoration and Gratitude, but not as a (religious) holiday.

— Berel Lazar,

At the same time, rabbi Zinovy Kogan, a vice-president of the Congress of the Jewish Religious Organizations and Associations in Russia, supported the initiative:

В победе над фашизмом есть сакральность: Всевышний через Советскую армию спас евреев и помог обрести государство.

There was a sacred meaning in the victory over fascism: God saved the Jewish people through the Soviet Army and helped to found the Jewish people's state.

— Zinovy Kogan,

Some rabbis initially rejected the sacred, religious meaning of the Victory, because 6 million, half of all Jewish people at the time, were still killed. However, with time, the view of importance and role of the Victory over nazism as a key historical moment of the Jewish people salvation and revival, eventually revealed.

According to views of Pinchas Goldschmidt, President of Conference of European Rabbis and Chief Rabbi of Moscow, the Day of Salvation and Liberation should be celebrated similarly to Pesach – as a sacred day of freeing Jewish people from slavery, as said in Pesach Haggadah: ″who has brought us out from slavery to freedom, from sorrow to joy, from grief to celebration; from darkness to great light and from enslavement to redemption″. Many Jews died in the Holocaust; however, for those who survived, that historical moment was truly a day of liberation and rescue from extermination camps.

Yisrael Meir Lau, the former Ashkenazi Chief Rabbi of Israel (1993–2003), the Chief Rabbi of Tel Aviv and chairman of Yad Vashem, in his statement from the 8th of the month Nisan year 5774 (8 April 2014), highlighted that the 26th day of the month Iyyar, as the Day of Salvation and Liberation, is the day to pray and thank the God who saved Jewish people, but also the day to commemorate the Holocaust and pay tribute to Righteous Among the Nations and all brave men who fought against and defeated the ″Nazi monster″

== Religious services ==
Once the Day of Salvation and Liberation was established as a religious holiday, a devoted set of prayers called ″Thank and Glory to Your Great Name″ was introduced, as well as the candle lighting ritual:

- First candle – to the glory of our God's will that rescued us.
- Second candle – in memory of ones who sacrificed their lives.
- Third candle – to honour warriors who fought for our rescue.
