= Victory in Europe Day (Israel) =

Israeli national holiday

Victory Day
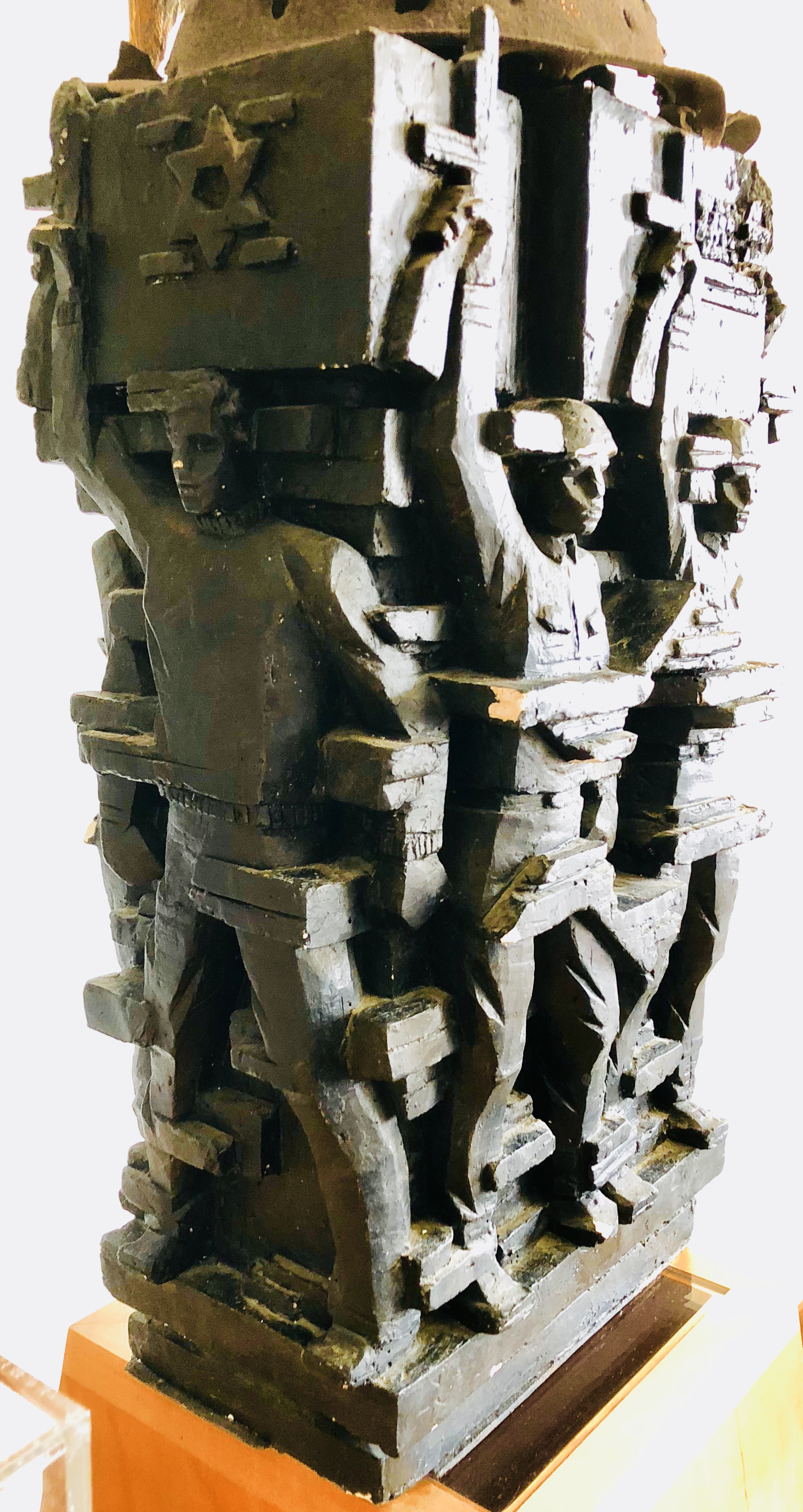
- Victory Day Memorial Statue in Israel - Yosef Matisyahu Collection
- Official name: Victory Day
- Observed by: State of Israel
- Significance: Celebrating the date of Nazi surrender ending World War II in Europe
- Date: 9 May
- Frequency: Annual

Victory Day (Hebrew: חגיגות יום הניצחון בארץ ישראל) is an Israeli national day of remembrance celebrated annually on Victory Day (9 May), to commemorate the day when the Nazis signed the German Instrument of Surrender to the Allied Expeditionary Force and the Red Army, ending World War II in Europe.

== History ==
Victory Day was created by the Israeli Knesset on July 26, 2017 as part of the Victory in Europe Day Law. According to the law, Victory in Europe Day shall be held once a year, on May 9, to mark the formal acceptance by the Allies of World War II of Nazi Germany's unconditional surrender of its armed forces.

While May 8 is when many of the Allies of World War II celebrate Victory in Europe Day, also known as VE Day, Israel follows most former USSR nations' celebrations as Victory Day (9 May). As a result of immigration of many Red Army veterans, Israel now hosts the largest and most extensive Victory Day celebrations outside the former Soviet Union. Many of the traditions and customs in Israel of Victory in Europe Day are the same as in Russia, with marches of Immortal Regiments held in cities with large populations of Red Army veterans and their descendants.

The marking of the holiday begins usually at 4am, with an auto rally from Metula to Eilat which is when German forces launched an attack on the Soviet Union on June 22, 1941.

Annually, a wreath is being placed by the Jewish National Fund and Red Army veterans at the Kibbutz Ma'ale HaHamisha where a plaque reading “The citizens of Israel planted this forest in honor of the Red Army.” is displayed. During the same day, a ceremony is held at the Victory in Europe monument in Netanya. The following day, the marches continue in Bat Yam and Ashdod and end with a Red Army veterans' march on May 14 in Jerusalem.

== See also ==
- Public holidays in Israel
- Culture of Israel
- Victory in Europe Day
- Victory Day (9 May)
- Day of Salvation and Liberation
