= Mountain Jews in Israel =

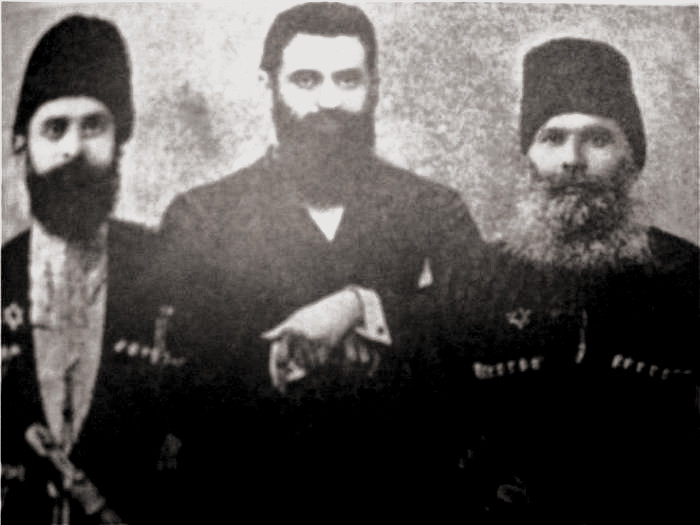

Total population
- 120,000–140,000

Regions with significant populations
- Beersheba, Or Akiva, Hadera, Acre, Sderot

Languages
- Hebrew, Juhuri, Russian

Religion
- Judaism

Mountain Jews in Israel, also known as the Juhurim, refers to immigrants and descendants of the immigrants of the Mountain Jewish communities, who now reside within the state of Israel.

== First wave of emigration: 1881–1947 ==
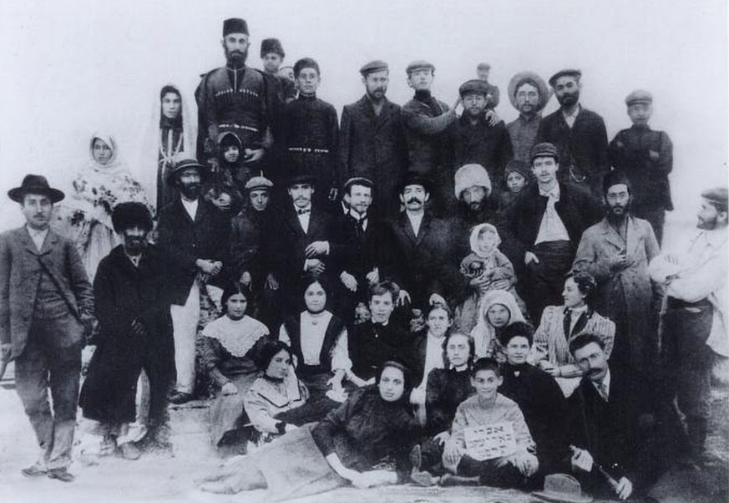
Founders of Be'er Ya'akov, 1908

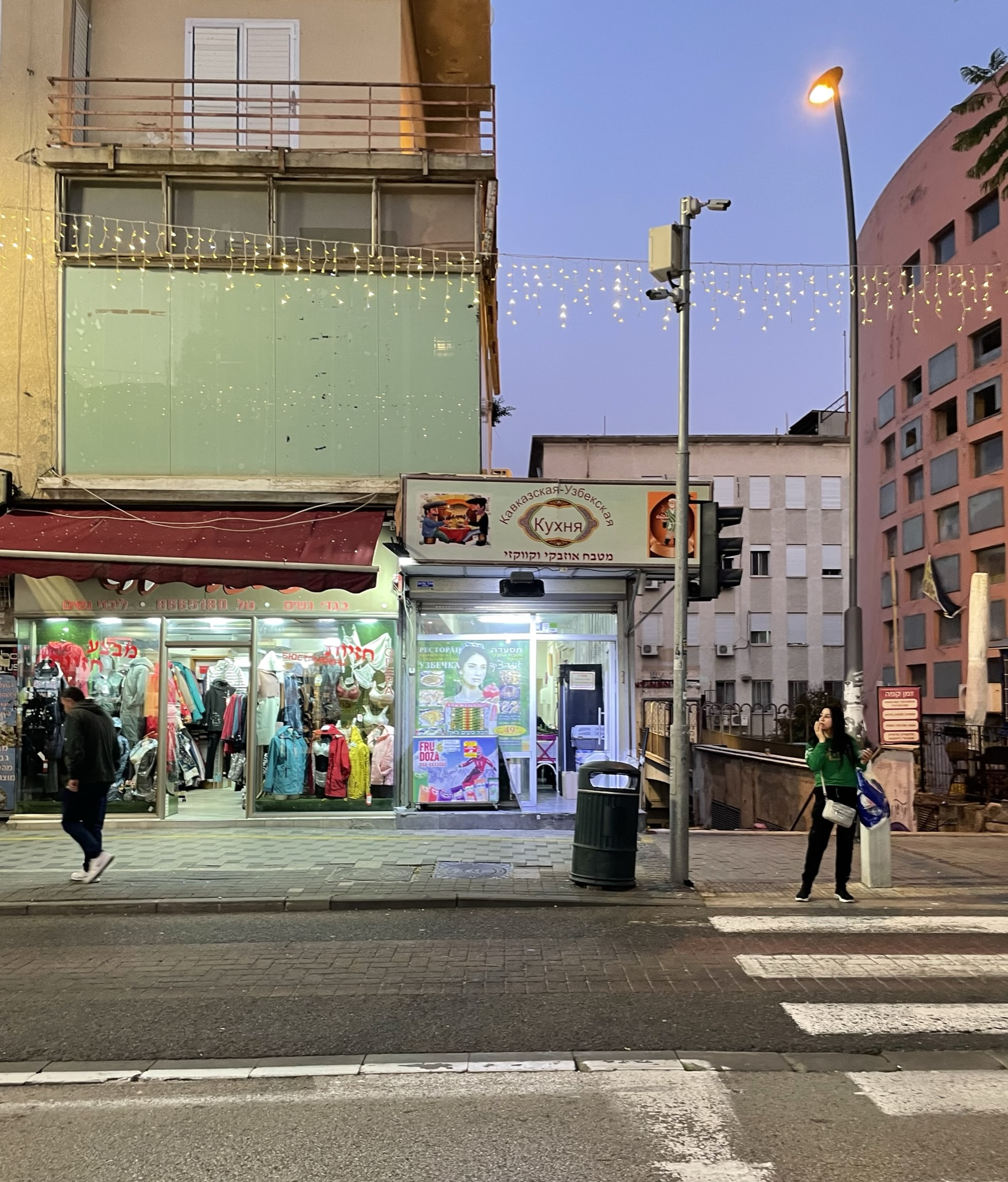
"Caucasian" (Mountain Jewish) and Uzbek restaurant in Haifa

Mountain Jews were among the first to make Aliyah, with some immigrating independent of the Zionist movement, while others came inspired by it. They were represented at the Zionist congresses and the first Mountain Jewish settlers in Ottoman Syria established the modern Israeli town of Be'er Ya'akov in 1907. In the early 1920s, Baku became one of the centres of the Jewish national movement, and Zionist newspapers were published in Juhuri.

== 1948–1970s ==
The Mountain Jews living in the Soviet Union celebrated the creation of the State of Israel loudly and proudly, which led to repression by Soviet authorities. Many were arrested and imprisoned for engaging in "anti-Soviet propaganda." The Six-Day War resulted in an eruption of Jewish patriotism among Mountain Jews, although the broader Zionist awakening didn't take place until the early 1970s. It was then when over 10,000 Mountain Jews (about a quarter of the population) emigrated to Israel.

== 1990s–present ==
Following the dissolution of the Soviet Union, thousands of Mountain Jews moved to Israel. During the First Chechen War, some left due to the violence. Despite the usual close relations between Jews and Chechens, many were kidnapped by Chechen gangs who ransomed their freedom to "the international Jewish community."

== Notable people ==
- Yekutiel Adam
- Udi Adam
- Yafa Yarkoni
- Sarit Hadad
- Lior Refaelov
- Omer Adam
- Astrix
- Eli Babayev
- Albert Solomonov
- Yehezkel Nisanov
- Zvi Nisanov
- Yekutiel Ravayev

== See also ==
- Mountain Jews
- Aliyah
- Iranian Jews in Israel
- Georgian Jews in Israel
- 1970s Soviet Union aliyah
- 1990s Post-Soviet aliyah
- Azerbaijan–Israel relations
