= Efrem Amiramov =

Russian singer-songwriter (1956–2025)

Efrem Amiramov (11 April 1956 – 9 October 2025) was a Russian singer and poet. A Mountain Jew born in Nalchik, he began his career in 1987. He was honored as a People's Artist of Kabardino-Balkaria, People's Artist of Ingushetia, and Honored Artist of the Karachay-Cherkess Republic. Amiramov died on 9 October 2025, at the age of 69. He was buried in Israel.

== Discography ==
=== Albums ===
- Posledniy debyut (1990)
- Posledniy debyut (1994) second issue
- Neprikosnovennyy zapas (1995)
- Belym po chornomu (1996)
- Alionka (2002)
- Vdokhnoveniye (2005)
- Posledniy Menestrel (2006)
- …Blagodarya tebe… (2008)
- Rodnyye dushi (2009)
- Pesni gorskikh yevreyev (2011)
