= Gennady Simeonovich Osipov =

Gennady Simeonovich Osipov (October 13, 1948 - 07 July 2020) was a Russian scientist, holding a Ph.D. and a Dr. Sci. in theoretical computer science, information technologies and artificial intelligence. He was the vice-president of the Institute for Systems Analysis of the Russian Academy of Sciences, professor at the Moscow Institute of Physics and Technology (State University), and at Bauman Moscow State Technical University. Osipov has contributed to the Theory of Dynamic Intelligent Systems and heterogeneous semantic networks used in applied intelligent systems.

== History ==
Seventh time President of Russian Association for Artificial Intelligence. In 1997-1999, 1999–2001, 2001–2003 Gennady Osipov received Governmental Grants for Outstanding Scholars by the Decree of the President of Russian Federation. Osipov is a member of the Russian Academy of Natural Sciences and of the Academy of Astronautics of Tsiolkovsky, Fellow of European Coordinating Committee for Artificial Intelligence (ECCAI fellow) and the vice-editor in chief of the “Artificial Intelligence and Decision Making” journal.

== Work ==
Osipov's work in Knowledge Acquisition fields has resulted in the Direct Knowledge Acquisition Method which integrates Knowledge Acquisition Methods by means of date, texts, and human experts. In 1998 Osipov designed the Theory of Dynamic Intelligent System, investigated the behaviour of Dynamic Intelligent Systems, and described classes of this type of Systems.

Osipov is the creator of the relational-situational model of text analysis, used in semantic search engines. He is the author of 120 articles, 5 monographs, 2 manuals, and 2 patents. He is one of the patentees of the Semantic search engine EXACTUS.

In the 2008 Russian Search Engine competition EXACTUS took first place in precision and completeness.

== Main publications in English ==
- Expert system tools for badly structured fields / Artificial Intelligence and Information-Control Systems of Robots-87. I.Plander (editor). Elsevier Science Publishers B.V. (North-Holland), 1987.
- The Method of direct Knowledge Acquisition from Human Experts. Proceedings of the 5th Banff Knowledge Acquisition for Knowledge-Based Systems Workshop, Banff, Canada, November, 1990.
- Formulation of Subject Domain Models: Part 1. Heterogeneous Semantic Nets. Journal of Computer and Systems Sciences International. Scripta Technica Inc., New-York, 1992.
- Construction of Subject Domain Models: Part II. Direct Knowledge Acquisition in the SIMER System. Journal of Computer and Systems Sciences International. Scripta Technica Inc., New-York, 1992.
- Special Knowledge and the Reasoning Mechanism in Problems of Conceptual Analysis. Journal of Computer and Systems Sciences International, 32(1), Scripta Technica Inc., 1994.
- Semiotic Modelling and Situation Control. Proc. of the 10th IEEE Internat. Simposium on Intelligent Control. Monterey, California, 1995.
- Semantic Types of Natural Language Statements. Proc. of the 10th IEEE Internat. Simposium on Intelligent Control. Monterey, California, 1995.
- Method for Extracting Semantic Types of Natural Language Statements from Texts. Proc. 10th IEEE Intern. Simposium on Intelligent Control. Monterey, California, 1995.
- Semiotic Modeling. Proc. of the Workshop on Situation Control and Cybernetics/Semiotics Modeling. Columbus, Ohio, 1995.
- Semiotic Systems and Models. Proc. of the 12th European Conference on Artificial Intelligence. Workshop on Applied Semiotics. Budapest, 1996.
- Evolving algebra's and labeled deductive systems for the semantic network based reasoning. Proc. of the 12th European Conference on Artificial Intelligence. Workshop on Applied Semiotics. Budapest, 1996.
- Interactive Synthesis of Knowledge Base Configuration. Proc. of the Second Joint Conference on Knowledge-Based Software Engineering. Sozopol, Bulgaria, 1996.
- Developing Models of a World with Regard for its Dynamics - General Principles. Proc. of SCI'97 - World Multiconference on Systemics, Cybernetics and Informatics, Vol.3, Caracas, Venezuela, 1997.
- Knowledge in semiotic models. Proc. of the Second Workshop on Applied Semiotics 7th Int. Conference AIICSR’97, Slovakia, 1997.
- Applied semiotics and intelligent control. Proc. of the Second Workshop on Applied Semiotics 7th Int. Conference AIICSR’97, Slovakia, 1997.
- Intelligent system for fish stock prediction and allowable catch evaluation. Proceedings of the Workshop on Binding Environmental Sciences and Artificial Intelligence, 13th European Conference on Artificial Intelligence (ECAI’98), Brighton, UK, 1998.
- Dynamics in Integrated Knowledge-Based Systems. Proceedings of the 1998 IEEE Joint Conference, Gaithersburg, MD, USA, 1998.
- Intelligent system for fish stock prediction and allowable catch evaluation. Environmental modelling & software, Elsevier Science Ltd., Volume 14, issue 5, 1999.
- Origins of Applied Semiotics. Proc. of the Workshop "Applied Semiotics: Control Problems (ASC 2000)". ECAI2000. 14th European Conference of Artificial Intelligence, Berlin, 2000.
- Attainable Sets and Knowledge Base Architecture in Discrete Dynamic Knowledge-based Systems. Proc. of the Workshop "Applied Semiotics: Control Problems (ASC 2000)". ECAI2000. 14th European Conference of Artificial Intelligence, Berlin, 2000.
- Architecture and Controllability of Knowledge-Based Discrete Dynamical Systems. Journal of Computer and Systems Sciences International, Vol.39, N 5, 2000.
- Dynamic Intelligent Systems: I. Knowledge Representation and Basic Algorithms. Journal of Computer and Systems Sciences International, Vol. 41, No. 6, 2002.
- Graphical Methods of Control for Safe Spacecraft Docking. 6th German-Russian Workshop “Pattern Recognition and Image Analysis” (OGRW-6-2003). Workshop Proceeding, Novosibirsk V.1.
- Dynamics in Semiotics. Proceedyngs. Integration of Knowledge Intensive Multi-agent Systems Conference, 2003, USA, Cambridge, MA. pp. 653–658.
- Dynamic Intelligent Systems: II. Computer Simulation of Task-Oriented Behavior. Journal of Computer and Systems Sciences International, Vol. 42, No. 1, 2003.
- Goal – Orientation for Systems with Proper Behaviour. In knowledge-Based Software Engineering // IOS Press, 2004, p 189- 196.
- Linguistic Knowledge for Search Relevance Improvement. Proceedings of Joint conference in knowledge-based software Engineering JCKBSE'06 IOS Press, 2006.
- Workflows and Their Discovery from Data. Proc. of International Conference on Integration of Knowledge Intensive Multi-Agent Systems (KIMAS-2007), Waltham, MA, USA.
- Limit behaviour of the dynamic rule-based systems. Proc. of the 13th international conference Knowledge – Dialog - Solution, Bulgary, Varna, 2007.
- Self-organizing and limit behaviour of dynamic knowledge - based systems. Proc. of Nineteenth European Meeting on Cybernetics and Systems, Vienna, 2008.
