= German Zakharyayev =

Azerbaijani-born businessman (born 1971)

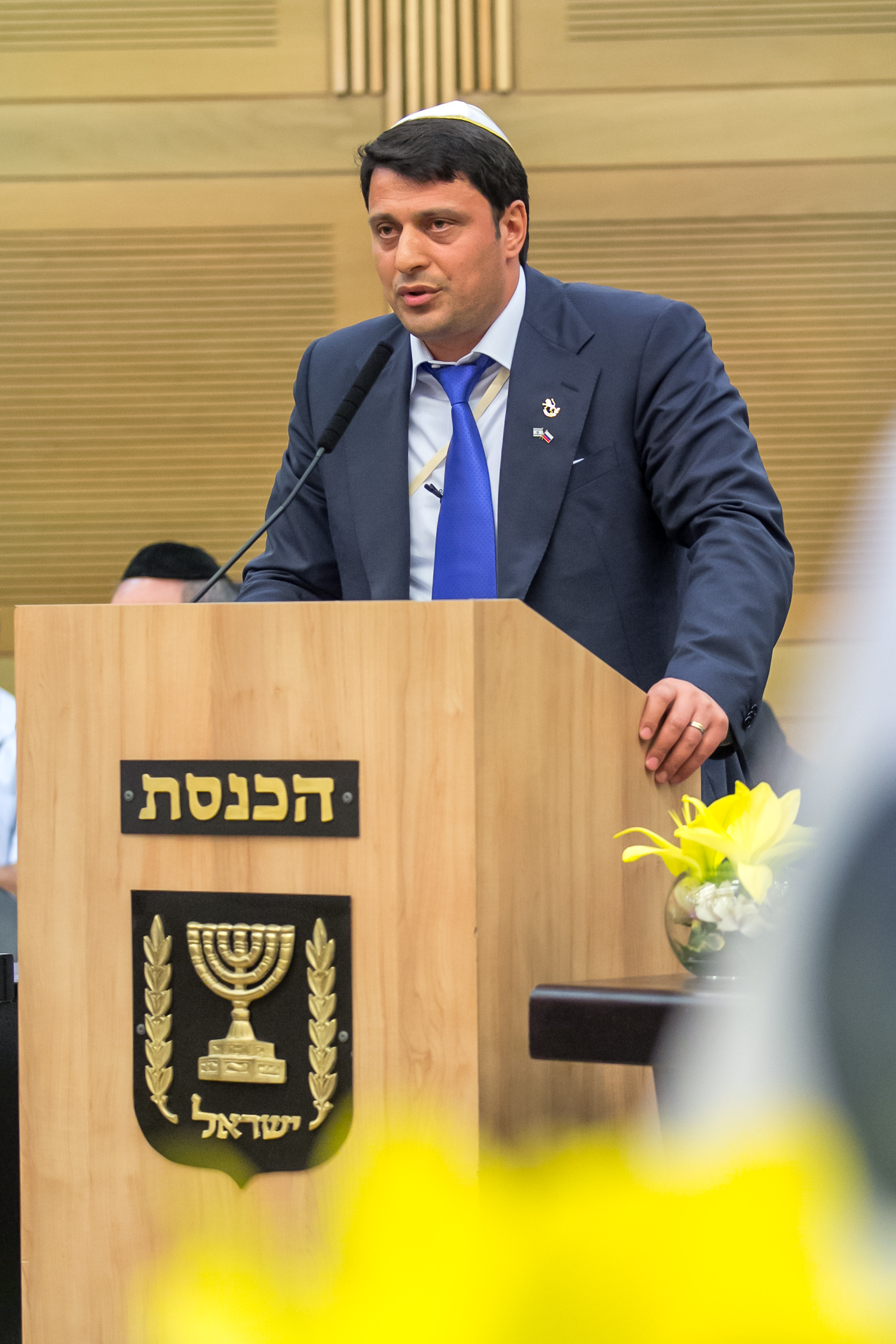
German Zakharyayev

German Rashbilovich Zakharyayev (Russian: Герман Рашбилович Захарьяев; born July 7, 1971, Qırmızı Qəsəbə, Azerbaijan SSR, Soviet Union) is an Azerbaijani-born businessman, public figure and philanthropist. He is a vice-president of the Russian Jewish Congress and the president of the International Charity Foundation of Mountain Jews STMEGI.

== Biography ==
German Zakharyayev was born in a large Mountain-Jewish family in Krasnaya Sloboda village in Azerbaijan on July 7, 1971. His father was a famous journalist and poet Rashbil Zakharyayev.

In 1992 he moved to Russia and started his own trade business. He is the president of the STMEGI foundation, founded in 2001, and vice-president of the Russian Jewish Congress.

He has a Ph.D. in philosophy from the Russian Presidential Academy of National Economy and Public Administration. The topic of the dissertation is: "Evolution of the religious-theological concept of Hasidism".

In 2012, he was appointed vice-president of the Russian Jewish Congress.

== Foundation and public activity ==
One of the priority directions of German Zakharyayev's activity is developing of the International Charity Foundation of Mountain Jews STMEGI, which was registered in 2001 in order to promote and preserve the historical and cultural diversity of the heritage of Mountain Jews, publish books, coordinate the work of the main Mountain Jewish organizations around the world, and provide regular support to members of the diaspora, such as the restoration of the Moscow Choral Synagogue for its centenary, donating Torah Scrolls to the synagogues and yeshivas, distribution of products for Passover and publishing activities. The STMEGI Foundation works to improve the image of Mountain Jews in Israel and started a series of radio programs about Mountain Jews on radio REKA (Israel).

== Media projects ==
With the participation of German Zakharyayev, STMEGI established in 2011 a Jewish media and information group. Its purpose is to unite all representatives of the Mountain Jews community in a single resource of its own, to collect all possible information about the community, its history, culture, art, figures. The foundation's website also launched a series of video lessons in Judeo-Tat, the Mountain Jews' language Juhuri, which includes many words in ancient Hebrew and Aramaic.

The STMEGI media group includes: monthly newspaper, the newspaper Birlik-Unity in Azerbaijan, the Internet channel STMEGI-TV, which cover the life of the community around the world and have its representatives in Russia, Israel, Azerbaijan, USA, Germany and Canada. The channel broadcasts daily news covering events from all over the world and tells about important events in Israel.

== 26 Iyar - The Day of Salvation and Liberation ==
Zakharyayev initiated a new holiday into the Jewish calendar – May 9, 1945 (according to the Jewish chronology – 26 Iyar 5705). In February 2014, German Zakharyayev appealed to the leading rabbis of Israel, Russia and European countries with a request to approve Iyar 26 as a holy day for Jews and to celebrate it widely. The idea received wide support, and in May of the same year for the first time Jewish communities around the world officially celebrated 26 Iyar – the Day of Salvation and Liberation. The introduction of the holiday was officially announced from the tribunes of the Israeli Knesset and the UN. On May 7, 2018, the Israeli Knesset passed a law and introduces the Day of Salvation and Liberation of Iyar 26 into the official list of holidays and memorable dates as the day of the surrender of Nazi Germany on May 9, 1945. In 2018 on Iyar 26, a special memorial ceremony was held at the Western Wall. The prayer was attended by: Chief Sephardic Rabbi of Israel Yitzhak Yosef, Chairman of the Council of Rabbis of Europe and Chief Rabbi of Moscow Pinchas Goldschmidt, Chief Rabbi of the Caucasian (Mountain Jewish) community Yaniv Naftaliev. Collective prayers were also held in many cities in Israel.

== Awards ==
- Medal Taraggi (Progress) (June 2, 2016, Azerbaijan) — for his merits in strengthening friendship between nations and the development of the Azerbaijani diaspora.
- Order of Friendship (May 29, 2019 Russia) — for the successes in labor and long-term conscientious work.

In 2019 he was awarded the Fiddler on the Roof Award in the Social Activism category.
