= Tesonet =

Lithuanian venture capital company

- Type: Private
- Industry: Software
- Founded: 2008; 18 years ago
- Founders: Tomas Okmanas; Eimantas Sabaliauskas
- Headquarters: Vilnius, Lithuania.
- Area served: Worldwide
- Key people: Tomas Okmanas (co-CEO); Eimantas Sabaliauskas (co-CEO)
- Revenue: ▲€4.53 million (2025)
- Operating income: ▲€808.4 million (2025)
- Net income: ▲€806.7 million (2025)
- Total assets: ▲€242 million (2025)
- Total equity: ▲€604 million (2025)
- Website: tesonet.com

Tesonet is a Lithuanian venture builder led by founders' office founded in 2008 by Tomas Okmanas and Eimantas Sabaliauskas. The company’s main focuses today are cybersecurity, web intelligence, AI, EdTech, SportTech, Finance, Infrastructure and other digital solutions. Businesses founded or accelerated by Tesonet include Nord Security, Hostinger, Oxylabs, Surfshark, Decodo, Mediatech, CyberCare, nexos.ai, Trendos and others. The number of people employed across the group exceeds 4,200. Structurally, Tesonet rests on 4 pillars: founded & kickstarted companies, investments, infrastructure and treasury & funds.

Since 2018, Tesonet has extended its reach by investing in successful ventures like CAST AI, Eneba, Artea, BC Žalgiris, BC London Lions, Turing College, Zapp, PartiQlar, and others.

== History ==
Having originally met in an IRC channel in 1999, Tomas Okmanas and Eimantas Sabaliauskas founded Tesonet in 2008 for a single project. In the end, however, it took 34 different projects and ideas – from web hosting and e-commerce to video games – to hit upon a viable business model.

NordVPN, the company’s first successful global product, was established in 2012, with a native Windows app coming out in September 2013.

In 2020, Verslo Žinios – the leading business media outlet in Lithuania – gave Okmanas the CEO of the Year award for his achievements as head of Nord Security, one of Tesonet’s largest companies.

In 2021, Tesonet’s customer service department, CyberCare, became a separate company, while remaining a part of the accelerator’s ecosystem. The move was made to ensure better support for Tesonet’s growing number of customers around the world. CyberCare provides multi-lingual services to people from 170 countries and resolves over 11 million enquiries per year. As of 2025, its team consists of more than 400 employees.

In 2022, after raising $100mln. from investors, Nord Security became Lithuania’s second unicorn, with a valuation of 1.6 billion US dollars. Speaking with CNBC News, Okmanas said it was the first time the company has taken external funding. Tesonet also partnered with BC Kauno Žalgiris and launched the sports and tech startup Žalgiris Ventures intended to promote innovation and expand the club’s range of fan services.

In 2024, the company also tripled its investment in the biotechnology startup MISHKAY Biotech and acquired the professional basketball team London Lions based in Stratford, East London.

== Local and global presence ==
In 2023, Okmanas placed 965th in Crunchbase’s global startup founder rankings and took part in the World Economic Forum at Davos.

The Lithuanian Reputation Index found Tesonet to be the second most-reputable company in the country.

== Portfolio ==
=== Founded companies ===
==== Nord Security ====
Founded in 2012 by Okmanas, Sabaliauskas and their childhood friends, Nord Security launched its first product – NordVPN – in 2013. This was followed by a suite of other products in later years: NordPass, NordLocker, and NordLayer in 2019, NordLynx in 2020, NordStellar in 2021, NordProtect in 2024, and others.

==== SurfShark ====
Established in 2018 as a VPN, Surfshark offers a range of cybersecurity tools: a VPN, a data leak detection system called Surfshark Alert, a private search tool known as Surfshark Search, and an antivirus named Surfshark Antivirus. Following a merger with Nord Security in 2022, it held a valuation of 1.6 billion US dollars.

===== Incogni =====
Launched by SurfShark in 2022, Incogni is a personal information removal service.

==== Oxylabs ====
A web data gathering and public web data scraping company, Oxylabs was founded in 2015. The company boasts the world’s largest ethically obtained pool of residential proxies, providing over 102 million IPs globally. During the global pandemic, Oxylabs partnered with researchers from Stanford University, Virginia Tech, University of Virginia, and others to track the spread of COVID-19. In 2022, the company won the Baltic Sustainability Award for its pro bono project with the Communications Regulatory Authority of the Republic of Lithuania to detect illegal online content with an AI-powered web scraper. In 2024, Oxylabs partnered with Bellingcat, a nonprofit investigative collective of researchers and citizen journalists, granting it free access to its expertise, proxy network, and Web Unblockers – an advanced solution to gathering public data from websites. In 2026 June Oxylabs received a $130 million investment from a leading private equity firm Warburg Pincus. The investment brings the value of the Oxylabs group to $3.6 billion, making it the second unicorn to emerge from the Tesonet accelerator and one of the highest-valued companies in Lithuania's history.

==== Mediatech ====
Founded in 2019, Mediatech aims to provide reliable, science-based information via such media channels as Cybernews and Healthnews. As of 2024, it owned a total of 8 media projects, employing 250 people and collaborating with around 200 freelance writers. Mediatech is also developing a number of online safety tools like Data Leak Checker and Ransomlooker.

==== CyberCare ====
Established in 2021, CyberCare is providing customer support for Tesonet portfolio products and developing AI solutions for customer care.

==== nexos.ai ====
Founded in 2024 by Okmanas and Sabaliauskas, nexos.ai is an artificial intelligence (AI) platform that specializes in AI Agents. nexos.ai was described as a platform for enterprises that takes AI projects from pilot to production. The company was announced publicly on January 15, 2025, and launched its product to the general public in May 2025. In 2025, the company raised €38 million in funding, co-led by Index Ventures and Evantic Capital (founded by former Sequoia partner Matt Miller), with additional participation from Creandum and Dig Ventures. TechCrunch named nexos.ai as one of the 60 most promising AI startups in 2025.

=== Investments ===
==== Hostinger ====
Hostinger is a web hosting company founded in Lithuania in 2004 as Hosting Media. Its services are divided into five categories: shared hosting, cloud hosting, VPS hosting, managed WordPress hosting, and email hosting. As of 2024, the company had over 3 million clients, 900 employees, and 11 data centres in Asia, Europe, and North and South America, managing around 5 million domains.

==== BC Žalgiris ====
In 2022, Tesonet acquired a 25% stake Kaunas basketball team Žalgiris, with the company’s representative, Jonas Karklys, joining its management board. Tesonet’s aim was to focus the club more on expanding its commercial offerings and developing sportstech innovations to further improve fan experiences. Okmanas also said Tesonet will be helping Žalgiris generate new revenue sources to make the club stronger in the future.

==== Artea ====
Artea, formerly known as Šiaulių Bankas, is one Lithuania’s major banking establishments. In 2021, Tesonet, Invalda INVL and ME Investicija signed an agreement with the European Bank for Reconstruction and Development to jointly acquire 18% of Artea’s shares with the company getting a 5.32% stake. The acquisition process was completed in 2024, following a series of individual transactions. According to Okmanas, Tesonet’s objective will be to assist the bank with fintech innovation and rolling out “smart and secure digital services and products”.

==== Turing College ====
Founded in 2020 after raising €1.2 million, Tesonet being among the investors, Turing College is an online coding and tech school, aimed primarily at busy professionals seeking to gain new skills or to switch careers. It is the first accredited virtual college in the Baltics and the first Lithuanian startup to participate in the accelerator Y Combinator in Silicon Valley. Tesonet was one of the company’s initial investors.

==== Eneba ====
In 2018, Tesonet acquired Helis Play, a software company founded by two college friends, Vytis Uogintas and Žygimantas Mikšta. That year, they launched Eneba – a video game and digital entertainment marketplace. Rapid growth during the pandemic lockdowns helped the company raise $8 million from Practica Capital and InReach Ventures in 2020. In 2013, it sold its products to over 15 million users, with 80% of the sales coming from repeat customers.

==== Cast AI ====
The Kubernetes automation platform Cast AI was founded in 2019 by Yuri Frayman, Leon Kuperman, and Laurent Gil. In 2020, the company closed a seed round with $7.7 million from TA Ventures, DNX, Florida Founders, and other angel investors. In 2021, Cast AI joined the Tesonet accelerator. According to Sabaliauskas, Tesonet saw “CAST AI as a vigorous and promising company”, which motivated it to “contribute not only by investing in it but also by sharing our experience”.

==== MISHKAY Biotech ====
Tesonet invested in MISHKAY in July, 2020, enabling the business to be launched next year. MISHKAY is a zero-waste startup producing functional foods and supplements from medicinal and edible mushrooms grown on its own farm. According to Sabaliauskas, the reason for Tesonet tripling its investment in 2024 was that MISHKAY “exceeded all forecasts despite growing sustainably” and was no longer able to meet demand. The startup works with pharmacies and universities, and plans to soon introduce new products for skin health and cholesterol control.

==== Cyber City ====
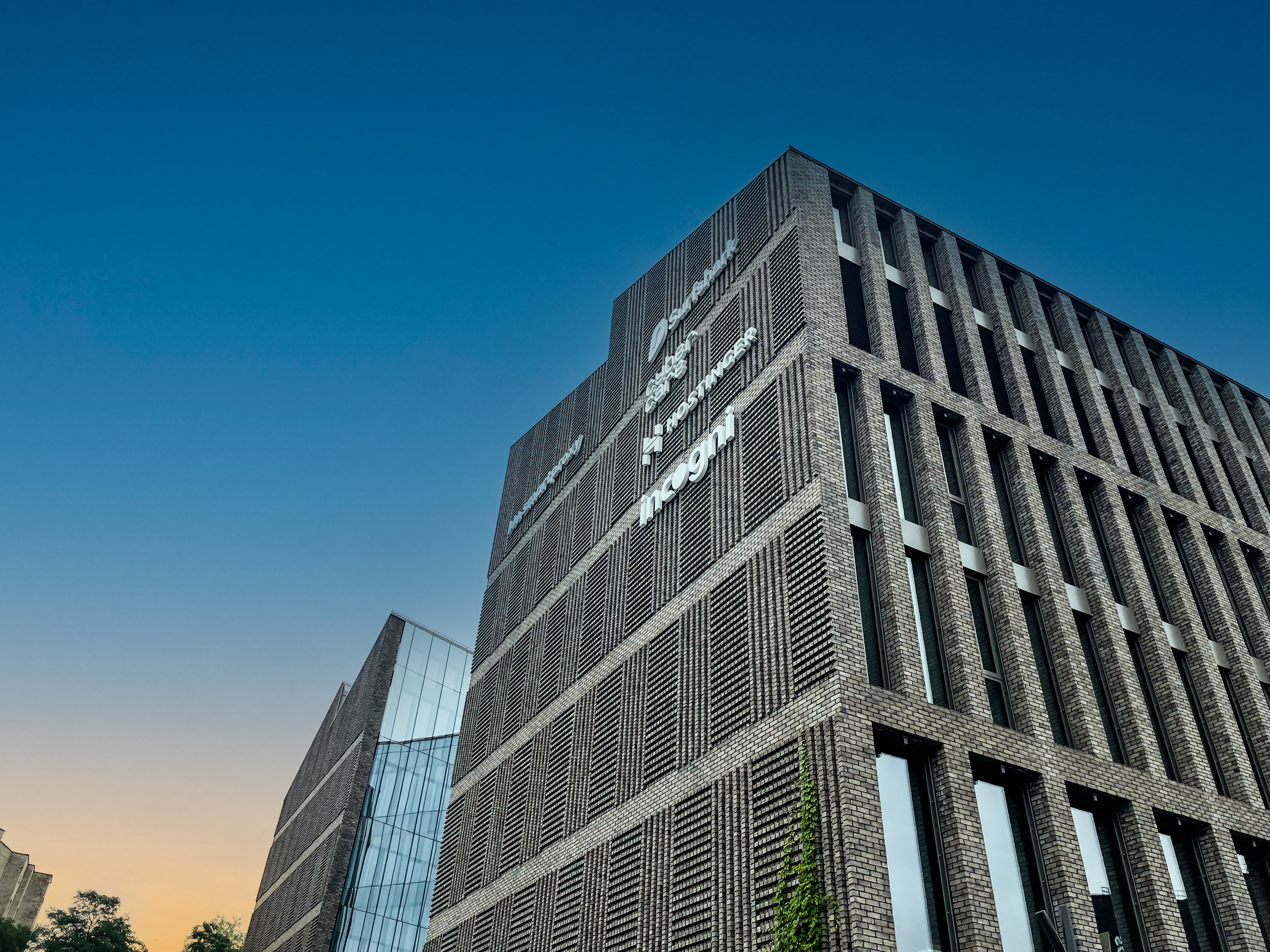

Tesonet is the biggest investor in, and tenant of, Cyber City – a tech business hub located within the 35,000 m^{2} territory of a decommissioned factory in Naujamiestis, Vilnius, Lithuania. Construction began in late 2020 and was completed in 2023. The hub consists of 4 Class A+ buildings that feature meeting rooms, co-working spaces, offices, commercial premises, recreational zones, gym and fitness areas. Its current occupancy exceeds 3,300 people.

==== Decodo ====
Decodo, formerly known as Smartproxy, is a proxy and public web data scraping service provider established in 2018. The company offers proxy services including data center, mobile, and residential proxies. Smartproxy rebranded as Decodo in April 2025 when it began offering web data collection tools.

==== BC London Lions ====
Founded in 1977 as the Hemel Hempstead Lakers, BC London Lions is based in Stratford, East London, where it competes in the Super League Basketball. Tesonet acquired London Lions in 2024. In 2025, the club announced plans to leave Stratford and build a new arena for youth programmes and community initiatives. The arena is expected to have a minimum capacity of 10,000 seats (Stratford’s Copper Box Arena, where London Lions currently play, has a 6,000-seat capacity).

==== FPRO ====
FPRO is a Lithuanian startup behind the interactive app designed to improve 6-12 year old children’s football technique, coordination, and ball control skills. The app, developed in collaboration with UEFA-certified coaches and experts in sports science, currently has a user base of 140,000+ children from the UK, Germany, the US, and other countries. In 2025, Tesonet invested €2 million into the venture during its first round of outside funding. The investment reflects Tesonet’s strategy to expand the sports innovation ecosystem while strengthening the community both in Lithuania and globally.

=== Limited partnerships in VC funds ===
Tesonet is also active in the European VC scene. As a Limited Partner, it participates in a number of VC funds, including Practica Capital, Firstpick, and others.
