= Tomas Okmanas =

Lithuanian businessman & entrepreneur

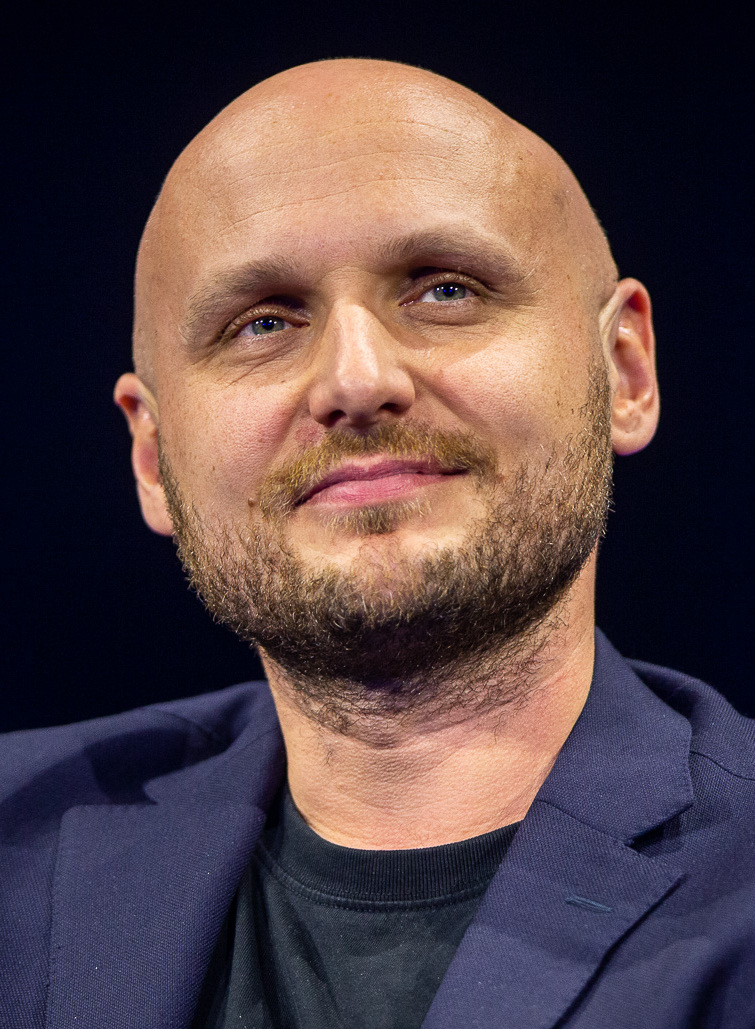
- Okmanas in 2022
- Born: Tomas Okmanas; 5 November 1987 (age 38); Vilnius, Lithuania
- Education: Vilnius University; Mykolas Romeris University
- Known for: Tesonet; Nord Security; NordVPN
- Title: co-founder of Tesonet and Nord Security

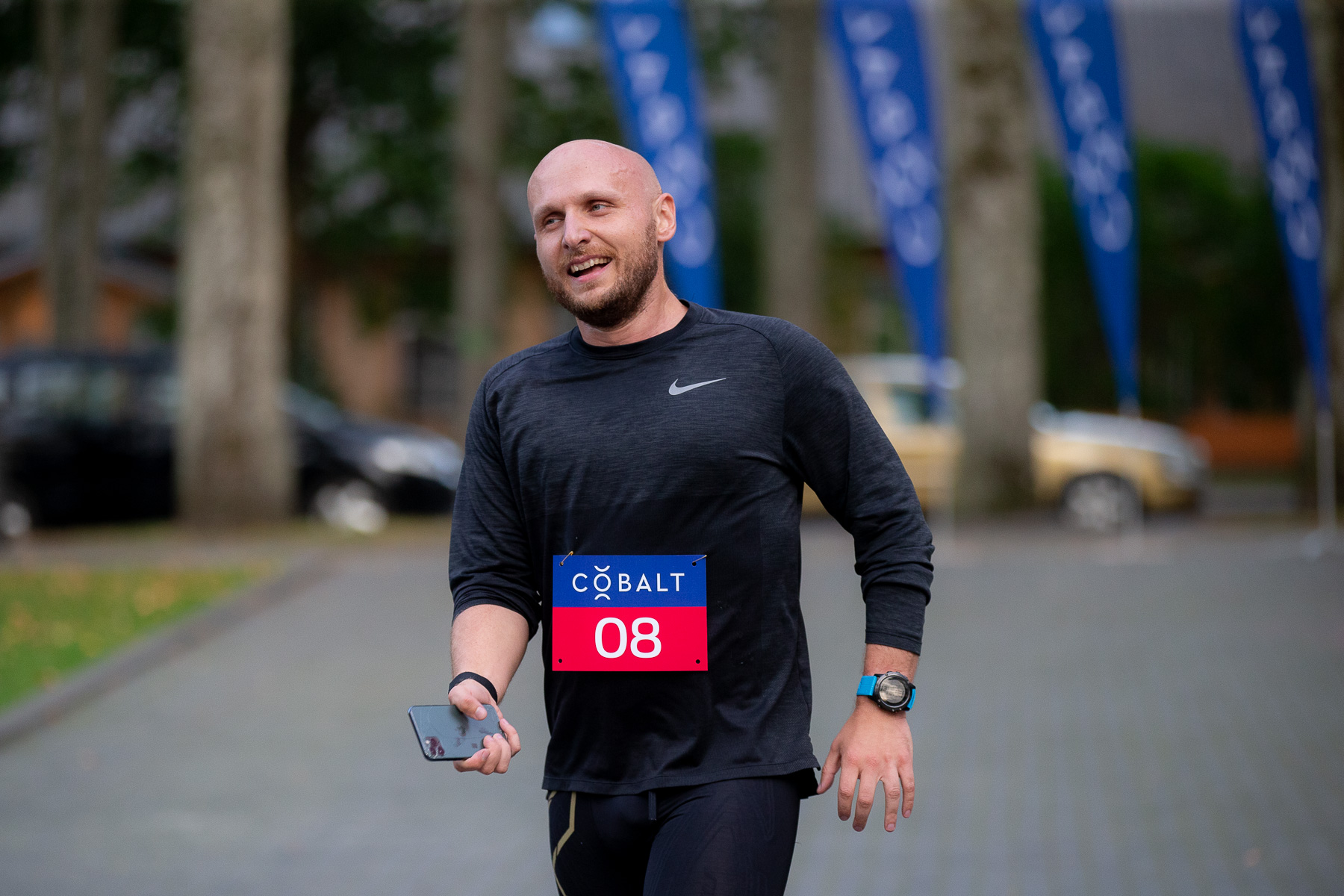
Okmanas in 2020

Tomas Okmanas (born 5 November 1987) is a Lithuanian tech-driven entrepreneur and investor, and co-founder of multiple global startups across both B2C and B2B sectors. He co-founded and is co-chief executive officer of a global cybersecurity company Nord Security, which operates the virtual private network service NordVPN. He also co-founded Tesonet, a founders-led group that builds, invests in, and accelerates products within cybersecurity, AI, web intelligence, sportech, edtech and other verticals. Under his leadership, the combined talent pool across his ventures now exceeds 3,600 people. He sits on the supervisory board of Artea Bank, one of the biggest banks in Lithuania. In 2024, Okmanas’ net worth was estimated to be €1.2 billion.

In 2022, Okmanas became a part-owner of EuroLeague team BC Žalgiris two years later, he bought the BC London Lions.

His latest venture is nexos.ai, an all-in-one AI platform for enterprises. Launched in 2025 January, nexos.ai secured $8 million early investment from Index Ventures, ten months later it closed a $35 million Series A round co-led by Evantic Capital and Index Ventures at $350 million valuation.

== Early life ==
Okmanas was born and raised in Vilnius. He earned a bachelor's degree in history at Vilnius University and later earned a master's degree in e-business management at Mykolas Romeris University.

== Career ==
Okmanas founded Tesonet with Eimantas Sabaliauskas in 2008. After trying 34 projects and ideas, from computer games to web hosting solutions, they finally focused on network security, business hosting, and big data solutions. Both individually and through the Tesonet accelerator, Okmanas invested in more than 50 projects and ventures. He mentors Lithuanian startups and helped launch an association to nurture them.

Tesonet helped develop the web intelligence platform Oxylabs, the hosting provider Hostinger, and the cybersecurity firm Surfshark, three companies ranked among Europe's fastest-growing by The Financial Times in 2024. Tesonet is a shareholder of Šiaulių Bankas, one of the biggest banks in Lithuania, where Okmanas holds a seat on the supervisory board.

He is a limited partner in other venture capital funds, including Creandum, Plural, and Moonfire.

In 2012, Okmanas co-founded the VPN service company NordVPN. He contributed to the development of the solution, significantly reducing the time required for TCP packets to travel between the client, the VPN server, and their ultimate destination. Okmanas is listed as one of the inventors of this method in the US patent office database.

In 2017, Okmanas co-founded Nord Security, an umbrella company for several cybersecurity solutions both for clients and businesses, like NordVPN, NordLayer, and NordPass.

Since 2020, Okmanas has been a member of the Forbes Technology Council.

He is a member of the board of trustees at the Vilnius University Institute of International Relations and Political Science, along with the eighth President of the Republic of Lithuania Dalia Grybauskaitė and other prominent Lithuanian figures.

In January 2025, Okmanas announced the launch of nexos.ai, intended to help enterprises adopt AI. He said that the idea came to him on October 28, 2024, and the product was ready in 30 days.

== Advocacy ==
Okmanas is a member of the board of directors of the Internet infrastructure coalition (i2Coalition), which aims to ensure that those who build the infrastructure of the internet have a voice in public policy. In 2019, i2Coalition and six leading VPN service providers launched an VPN Trust Initiative (VTI), which the following year released a set of principles for VPN providers.

In 2023, Okmanas and fellow Tesonet shareholder Eimantas Sabaliauskas helped raise one million euros for Ukraine in an hour, then doubled the donation. For their philanthropy, Okmanas and Sabaliauskas were named National Patrons of Lithuania.
