= Surfshark B.V. =

Dutch cybersecurity company

- Type: Private
- Industry: Software
- Founded: 2018
- Fate: Merged With Nord Security
- Headquarters: The Netherlands
- Area served: Worldwide
- Products: Cybersecurity software
- Services: Computer security
- Parent: Cyberspace B.V.
- Website: surfshark.com

Surfshark B.V. is a cybersecurity company that was established in 2018. It launched its first product, Surfshark VPN, in the same year. Currently, Surfshark offers a range of cybersecurity tools: a VPN, a data leak detection system called Alert, a private search tool known as Search, and an antivirus. The company also provides a personal data removal service called Incogni, an alternative credential generator called Alternative ID, alternative virtual phone number generator Alternative Number, adblocker CleanWeb and a Dedicated IP service.

Surfshark, initially registered in the British Virgin Islands (BVI), moved its headquarters to the Netherlands on October 1, 2021. The Netherlands serves no legal obligation for companies to log or retain user data and abides by GDPR requirements. Surfshark also has offices in Lithuania, Poland, and Germany. In 2022, Surfshark and Nord Security merged under one holding company while maintaining independent operations.

== History ==
Surfshark was launched in 2018 when it introduced its first VPN application. In 2018, Surfshark's browser extensions underwent an external audit by a German cybersecurity firm, Cure53. In 2019, Surfshark launched Surfshark Alert & Surfshark Search and became one of the first ten VPN packages to receive an official seal of approval granted by an independent IT-Security Institute AV-TEST. The same year Surfshark started their research activities, releasing the first Digital Quality of Life (DQL) index.

In 2020, Surfshark moved to 100% RAM-only servers, introduced the WireGuard protocol, and became a founding member of the VPN Trust Initiative. In 2021, Surfshark was named Best VPN by the Trusted Reviews Awards, as well as the PCMag Editor's Choice award, and was named TechRadar’s must-have Work from Home app. Surfshark also successfully passed an external audit by Cure53. In the same year, Surfshark launched Surfshark Antivirus & Incogni.

In mid-2021, Surfshark began merging with Nord Security, the parent company of NordVPN. The merger was finalized in early 2022, with both brands continuing to operate independently and relying on separate infrastructures and different product development plans. The company also released its first annual report.

In August 2022, Surfshark exclusively partnered with digital rights watchdog NetBlocks for greater reporting on internet shutdowns. Later, in 2022, Surfshark closed its physical servers in India in response to CERT-In's (Indian Computer Emergency Response Team) order for VPN companies to store consumers' personal data for five years. Later that year, Surfshark released Linux GUI, and Surfshark Nexus, a technology that connects all of Surfshark's VPN servers into one network. During 2022, Surfshark reached 100 different server country locations and, together with Nord Security, gained Unicorn status. At the end of the year Deloitte tested and approved Surfshark’s compliance with the no-logs policy, reassuring that the company does not track its users' online activities.

In 2023, Surfshark launched its Dedicated IP and Alternative ID services. In September 2023, Surfshark received the Trust Seal badge after passing the VPN Trust Initiative (VTI) assessment. The Surfshark VPN app for Android also passed the Mobile App Security Assessment (MASA) audit in 2023.

In 2024, Surfshark introduced its Apple TV app and a new product – Alternative Number. Surfshark VPN was selected for TechAdvisor's Editor's Choice award and Surfshark Antivirus earned its certification by AV-TEST. The company ranked 47th in the Financial Times 1000: Europe's Fastest Growing Companies list. Surfshark also ranked 8th in the IT & Software category of the same FT-Statista annual ranking list.

In 2025, Surfshark once again completed a no-logs audit performed by Deloitte to confirm its no-tracking policy. It was again included in the Financial Times 1000: Europe's Fastest Growing Companies list.

== Technology ==
In December 2019, Surfshark implemented GPS-Spoofing for Android, letting users change their device's physical geolocation to one of the server's locations. That same year, Surfshark launched Surfshark Alert and Surfshark Search.

Surfshark uses IKEv2, OpenVPN, and WireGuard connection protocols in its applications. All data transferred via Surfshark servers is encrypted using an AES-256-GCM encryption standard.

In July 2020, Surfshark announced its entire server network is running on RAM-only servers.

In 2021, Surfshark launched Surfshark Antivirus & Incogni. That same year, Surfshark also launched a cookie pop-up blocker, adblocker CleanWeb, an in-app notification center, new browser extensions, a macOS app and started moving their servers to 10Gbps.

In February 2022, Surfshark added the IP rotator feature and released the Surfshark Nexus technology. Nexus uses Software Defined Networking (SDN) to connect Surfshark’s VPN servers into a single, global network.

In May 2022, Surfshark announced Linux GUI, added real-time protection to Surfshark Antivirus & added a pause feature to the VPN app. In June 2022, Surfshark shut down physical servers in India in response to the new data law. In August 2022, Surfshark added a manual WireGuard connection feature. In October 2022, Surfshark reached 100 different server country locations.

In January 2023, Surfshark released Dynamic MultiHop, an upgrade to the double VPN feature called MultiHop. Dynamic MultiHop allows users to choose which two location servers they want to route their traffic through.

In June 2023, Surfshark launched Dedicated IP, which gives a user a unique and static IP address when connected to a VPN. Later that year, Surfshark launched Alternative ID, which generates a brand-new online identity & email.

In 2024, Surfshark launched an app for Apple TV and other new products – Alternative Number, Dedicated IP and a free data-leak checking tool. It also upgraded all of its VPN servers to 10Gbps.

In 2025, Surfshark's VPN Bypasser feature was made available on all major platforms, and new Dedicated IP locations were added. The same year, Surfshark also launched FastTrack – VPN route optimization, and Everlink – patented self-healing VPN infrastructure for a stable VPN protection.

== Products and features ==
=== Surfshark VPN ===
A cybersecurity software that improves online safety, privacy, and censored content accessibility. A VPN routes traffic through a server, changes the IP address, and encrypts the device’s internet traffic. Surfshark VPN offers unlimited simultaneous connections and all essential VPN features. Available on: Windows, macOS, Linux, iOS, Android, Chrome, Firefox, Edge, routers, FireTV, and other smart TVs.

=== Surfshark Antivirus ===
A malware protection software that secures the device, all its files and the webcam. Antivirus allows protection for up to 5 devices, lets users schedule system scans, and continually scans the user's device with real-time protection. Available on: Windows, Android, and macOS.

=== Surfshark Alert ===
A personal data monitoring tool that gives immediate alerts whenever the user’s emails, credit cards, or personal IDs are part of a data breach which appeared online. It also sends monthly or quarterly reports on personal data security. Available on: Windows, macOS, Linux, iOS, Android, Chrome, Firefox, Edge, and the account page.

=== Surfshark Search ===
A private search engine that doesn't track the user and gives purely organic results unaffected by previous searches. Users can also change the search engine’s location to other countries and get local results. Available on: Windows, macOS, iOS, Android, Chrome, Firefox, Edge, or the official website.

=== Dedicated IP ===
A dedicated IP (Internet Protocol) is a unique IP address assigned to only one user. It gives the same IP address whenever the user connects to the designated VPN server. Dedicated IP combines the protection of a VPN with a fixed IP address. Available on: Windows, macOS, Linux, iOS, Android, Chrome, Firefox, Edge, routers, Apple TV, FireTV, and other smart TVs.

=== CleanWeb ===
A VPN-integrated feature and browser extension that blocks ads, trackers, cookie pop-ups, and access to known malicious websites, providing protection against phishing and malware. By preventing unwanted content from loading, it helps to maintain privacy, improve browsing speed and reduce data usage.

=== Alternative ID ===
A Surfshark product that generates a brand-new online persona with a name, age, address, and email. The user can create up to three emails at a time and safely forward the incoming traffic to their real email address. Available on: Windows, macOS, iOS, Android, Chrome extension, and the account page.

=== Alternative Number ===
Surfshark's Alternative Number is a virtual phone number service designed to protect users' privacy by masking their real phone numbers. The service enables users to receive and respond to messages and incoming calls through the Surfshark app without disclosing their personal information.

== Research ==
In 2019, Surfshark released the first Digital Quality of Life index, a study evaluating the digital wellbeing of countries worldwide. The research is updated yearly, and the best-performing countries are selected based on internet affordability, internet quality, electronic infrastructure, electronic security, and electronic government.

Throughout the years, Surfshark collected information about internet regulations, global data breaches, and data vulnerabilities and has conducted five major research projects: Digital Quality of Life Index, Internet Shutdown Tracker, Data Vulnerability Thermometer, Global Data Breach Statistics, Report on Government Requests for User Data.

== Social responsibility ==
Surfshark is one of the founding members of the VPN Trust Initiative (VTI), which was established in 2020. VPN Trust InitiativeMembers focuses on improving internet security for consumers and all of its members must follow the VTI principles, ensuring that member companies are secure, trusted, and transparent to their users.

In August 2022, Surfshark collaborated with an internet monitoring organization, NetBlocks, to bring awareness and spread the news of worldwide internet disruptions. Together, they also developed a Digital Survival Kit that outlines key steps to prepare for potential internet shutdowns and censorship.

In 2022, Surfshark joined EDRi (European Digital Rights), the biggest European network defending digital rights and freedom. That same year, Surfshark joined The Global Encryption Coalition (GEC) to advocate for strong encryption.

Surfshark also collaborated with The Internet Society to spread awareness about Splinternet and Electronic Frontier Foundation (EFF) to discuss surveillance technologies.

=== Initiatives ===
In 2022, Surfshark took part in two major initiatives: The Cyberocean initiative, a gamified program for kids meant to teach them about online dangers, and the Women Go Tech mentorship, where some of Surfshark’s employees contributed as mentors to the campaign for diversity in tech-related careers.

In 2023, Surfshark launched the Emergency VPN program and provided VPN subscriptions to journalists, activists, NGO representatives, and journalists working under harsh conditions.

In 2024, Surfshark was one of the sponsors of EDRi's Privacy Camp event and Press Play Prague – an international film festival focused on investigative journalism. It also launched a free course on Udemy to help people to spot online scams and improve cybersecurity awareness.

In 2025, Surfshark became one of the sponsors of AccessNow RightsCon in Taiwan, International Press Institute and EDRi's Privacy Camp.

=== Sustainability ===
By the end of 2023, Surfshark joined the UN Global Compact. In 2024, Surfshark launched its first Impact Report, which was followed by another one in 2025. These reports detail Surfshark's initiatives to measure and reduce its environmental impact, including the calculation of greenhouse gas emissions, outline employee wellbeing programs, describe its social contributions beyond the organization and provide information on internal corporate practices and transparency.
