= NordLayer =

Network access security service

- Original authors: Tomas Okmanas, Eimantas Sabaliauskas
- Developer: Nord Security
- Release: 2019; 7 years ago
- Stable release: Android 3.6.0 (January 23, 2023) iOS 3.7.0 (January 16, 2023) macOS 2.6.2 (January 16, 2023); Windows 2.6.3 (January 10, 2023); Linux 2.6.1 (January 4, 2023)
- Operating system: Android; iOS; Linux; macOS; Windows
- Platform: Personal computer; smartphone; Tablet
- Type: Virtual private network
- License: Proprietary software
- Website: nordlayer.com

NordLayer, formerly known as NordVPN Teams, is a network access security service with applications for Microsoft Windows, macOS, Linux, Android and iOS and Browser extension. The software is marketed as a privacy and security tool that enables the implementation of Zero Trust Network Access (ZTNA), Secure Web Gateway (SWG), and Firewall-as-a-Service (FWaaS) in hybrid and multi-cloud cloud environments.

It is developed by Nord Security (formerly Nordsec Ltd), a company that creates cybersecurity software, and was initially supported by the Lithuanian startup accelerator and business incubator Tesonet.

== History ==
NordLayer was founded in 2019 as NordVPN Teams as a subsidiary of NordSecurity, a technology company that develops and provides virtual private network (VPN) services, such as NordVPN and SurfShark.

In October 2020, NordVPN Team relocated to the United States as part of a larger effort to expand its operations and better serve its enterprise clients. Nevertheless, Nordlayer committed to maintaining its Panamanian corporate structure, allowing it to remain outside the jurisdiction of the Fourteen Eyes intelligence sharing pact, which includes the United States, the United Kingdom, Australia, Canada, and other countries.

In September 2021, the NordVPN Teams was rebranded to NordLayer. The transition marked the introduction of advanced network access control capabilities, positioning NordLayer as part of the broader secure access service edge (SASE) framework.

== Products ==
The NordLayer platform enables IT administrators to add, remove, or transfer user accounts, dedicated servers, or custom gateways — with static or dedicated IP addresses — for specific teams to remotely access a company's LAN. In addition, network administrators have the ability to monitor user activity and obtain information about the connection. This includes checking whether the devices being used comply with predefined security rules.

Nordlayer offers a Single Sign-On (SSO) login option to its users. SSO logins are currently supported through various providers, including Google SSO, Entra ID (Azure AD), Okta, JumpCloud and OneLogin. NordLayer supports various second-factor confirmation (multi-factor authentication) methods, including SMS authentication, Time-based One-Time Password (TOTP) authentication, and biometric authentication.

NordLayer provides continuous authentication and identity verification to grant access to network resources based on multiple network access control rules. NordLayer employs the Advanced Encryption Standard (AES) with 256-bit keys and the ChaCha20 stream cipher.

NordLayer prevents cyber threats like DDoS, Man-in-the-Middle (MITM) attacks, phishing, data leaks, and others with features such as two-factor authentication (2FA), Always-On VPN, kill switch, IP allowlisting, Cloud Firewall, Device Posture Security, and others.

NordLayer's Secure Web Gateway (SWG) provides features for web security such as web filtering, content filtering, application control, IP masking, and traffic encryption.

Nordlayer currently has 30+ global dedicated server locations.

== Reception ==
In a review published by TechRadar in August 2022, the reviewer wrote positively about NordLayer's interface, kill switch, private gateways, biometrics, and concluded that "NordLayer is an easy-to-use service, with simple but well-engineered quality apps, which makes it easy to secure employee access to your networks and the internet."

== See also ==
- NordVPN
- NordLocker
- NordPass
