= Marijus Briedis =

Lithuanian software engineer

- Born: Jurbarkas, Lithuania
- Citizenship: Lithuanian
- Education: Kaunas College — BSc in computer systems, networking, and telecommunications
- Occupations: Cybersecurity expert, software engineer, technology executive
- Years active: 2008–present
- Organization(s): NordVPN; Nord Security; Tesonet
- Title: Chief technology officer at NordVPN

Marijus Briedis is a Lithuanian cybersecurity expert, software engineer, and technology executive. He serves as chief technology officer of NordVPN, a cybersecurity product developed by Nord Security, where he leads engineering, infrastructure, product security, and technology strategy.

Briedis has written and spoken on topics including cybersecurity, privacy technologies, network architecture, secure software delivery, and technology development, including artificial intelligence, internet of things security, and post-quantum encryption.

== Early life ==
Briedis developed an early interest in information technology and later pursued formal education in computer systems, networking, and telecommunications at Kaunas College in Lithuania, where he completed a bachelor's degree in computer systems engineering.

He later completed additional technical training in containerization and cloud-native infrastructure through The Linux Foundation, including Kubernetes Fundamentals certification.

== Career ==
=== Early career ===
Briedis began his professional career as an information technology specialist at a public-sector technology center, where he worked on server administration, infrastructure maintenance, and network operations.

He later worked independently as a web developer and systems engineer, contributing to software development and infrastructure projects before moving into Linux systems administration and cybersecurity-focused engineering roles.

=== Nord Security and NordVPN ===
Briedis joined Nord Security as a Linux systems administrator during the company's expansion into consumer privacy and network security products.

He later held senior engineering and infrastructure leadership roles before being appointed chief technology officer of NordVPN in 2019.

As CTO, Briedis has led engineering teams responsible for cloud infrastructure, secure software development, privacy architecture, and product scalability.

During his tenure, NordVPN introduced initiatives related to network modernization, AI-assisted threat detection, and post-quantum encryption research.

== Achievements ==
In 2022, Marijus Briedis was named among the finalists in a list of Lithuania's leading technology executives published by 15min.

In 2024, Briedis was selected for the European Young Leaders program organized by Friends of Europe, which recognizes professionals from business, public policy, science, and technology across Europe.

In 2025, he contributed to Cyber Resilience Compass 2025, an international report focused on cyber resilience, enterprise security strategy, and digital risk management.

He has spoken at international conferences, including RightsCon 2025, cybersecurity forums in Switzerland, technology accelerators in Ukraine, and technical events in Lithuania.

He has commented publicly on artificial intelligence governance, cybersecurity regulation, privacy technologies, and digital infrastructure through interviews and commentary published by Business Insider, Forbes, TechRadar, IGN, and The Telegraph.

== Personal life ==
Outside of his work in technology, Briedis has publicly supported educational, cultural, and humanitarian initiatives.

Briedis volunteered with the APAN Volunteers Network in Diriamba, Nicaragua, where he organized extracurricular educational activities and computer literacy workshops in seven public schools, working with local students and educators on technology-focused learning initiatives.
