= Microsoft Entra =

Microsoft Entra may refer to:

- Microsoft Entra Connect, a software service tool
- Microsoft Entra ID, a cloud-based identity-management service
