= Surfshark VPN =

Virtual private network provider

- Developer: Surfshark B.V.
- Release: April 16, 2018
- Stable release: 6.12.0 (Windows) / 4.27.2 (macOS) / May 27, 2026; 5 months ago
- Preview release: Android 2.8.2 (December 15, 2022); iOS 3.7.3 (December 14, 2022); Windows 6.10.0; macOS 4.6.0 (December 6, 2022); Linux 1.2.3 (November 8, 2022)
- Operating system: Android; Chrome; Firefox; Fire TV; iOS; Linux; macOS; Windows
- Platform: Personal computer; smartphone; router; smart TV
- Available in: English, German, Spanish, French, Italian, Polish, Portuguese (Brazil), Russian, Ukrainian, Korean, Chinese (Simplified), Chinese (Traditional), Japanese
- Type: Virtual private network
- License: Proprietary software
- Website: surfshark.com

Surfshark is a European VPN service and digital privacy tool founded in Lithuania. Surfshark is headquartered in Amsterdam, with additional offices in Lithuania, Poland, and Germany.

Besides its VPN service, Surfshark offers other services such as an antivirus, data leak detection tool, a private search tool, and an automated personal data removal system, a digital identity generator, and others. In 2024 and 2025, the Financial Times ranked Surfshark as one of the fastest-growing European companies.

== History ==
Surfshark was launched in 2018 when it introduced its first VPN application for iOS devices. In 2019, the company launched Surfshark Alert and Surfshark Search and started their research activities, releasing the first Digital Quality of Life (DQL) index. Later, in October 2019, Surfshark became one of the first ten VPN packages to receive an official seal of approval granted by an independent IT-Security Institute AV-TEST.

In 2020, Surfshark moved to 100% RAM-only servers, introduced WireGuard, and became a founding member of the VPN Trust Initiative. Later in 2020, Surfshark was named the best VPN of 2020 by CNN. In 2021, Surfshark was named Best VPN by the Trusted Reviews Awards. In the same year, Surfshark launched Surfshark Antivirus and Incogni. Surfshark also won the PCMag Editors Choice award and successfully passed an external audit by Cure53.

In mid-2021, Surfshark began the process of merging with Nord Security, the parent company of the popular NordVPN. The merger was finalized in early 2022, with both brands continuing to operate independently. In August 2022, Surfshark exclusively partnered with digital rights watchdog NetBlocks for greater reporting on internet shutdowns, which led to the creation of the Internet Shutdown Tracker study.

Later in 2022, Surfshark closed its physical servers in India in response to the CERT-In's order for VPN companies to store consumers' personal data for a period of five years. That same year, Surfshark released Surfshark Nexus, together with Nord Security gained the Unicorn status, released Linux GUI, reached 100 different server country locations, and was included in CNET's 2022 Best Overall VPN list. At the end of the year, Deloitte performed an independent no-logs audit and approved Surfshark's compliance with its no-logs policy, reassuring the company does not track its users' online activities. In 2023, Surfshark launched its Dedicated IP and Alternative ID services. In September 2023, Surfshark received its Trust Seal after passing VPN Trust Initiative's assessment. Surfshark's VPN Android app passed Mobile App Security Assessment (MASA) audit by NowSecure.

In 2024, Surfshark ranked 47th in the Financial Times 1000: Europe's Fastest Growing Companies list. It ranked 8th in the IT & Software category. In 2025, it was again included in the Financial Times 1000: Europe's Fastest Growing Companies list and underwent another no-logs audit by Deloitte. Also in 2025, Surfshark participated in Access Now RightsCon digital rights conference held in Taipei, Taiwan.

== Technology ==
In December 2019, Surfshark implemented GPS-Spoofing for Android, allowing users to hide their device's physical geolocation by changing it to one of the server's locations. In its applications, Surfshark uses IKEv2 and OpenVPN protocols. All data transferred via Surfshark servers is encrypted using an AES-256-GCM encryption standard. That same year, Surfshark launched Surfshark Alert and Surfshark Search. In July 2020, Surfshark announced its entire server network runs on RAM-only servers.

In 2021, Surfshark launched Surfshark Antivirus and Incogni. In the same year, Surfshark also launched a cookie pop-up blocker, an in-app notification center, new browser extensions, a macOS app, and started moving their servers to 10Gbit/s. In February 2022, Surfshark released the Surfshark Nexus technology. In May 2022, Surfshark announced Linux GUI, added real-time protection to Surfshark Antivirus and added a pause feature to the VPN app.

In August 2022, Surfshark added a manual WireGuard connection feature. In January 2023, Surfshark released Dynamic MultiHop, an upgrade to the double VPN feature called MultiHop, which allows to choose two location servers users want to route their traffic through. In June 2023, Surfshark launched Dedicated IP, which gives a user static IP address when connected to a VPN. Later that year, Surfshark launched Alternative ID – a tool that generates a brand-new online identity and email. In 2024, Surfshark launched its Apple TV app and Alternative Number. It also upgraded all of its servers to 10-Gbps. In 2025, Surfshark launched FastTrack, which optimizes VPN traffic routing. Also, the company launched Everlink – a patented self-healing VPN infrastructure for stable VPN protection to maintain uninterrupted service.

=== Features ===
Surfshark developed apps with a GUI for iOS, macOS, Android, Windows and Linux. They have browser extensions for Chrome, Firefox and Microsoft Edge. Surfshark provides connections for routers, consoles, and TVs. Surfshark accepts crypto payment methods, offers 4500+ servers in 100 countries, has no bandwidth limitations, and operates under a strict no-logs policy verified by Deloitte. Surfshark offers OpenVPN (UDP), Open VPN (TCP), IKEv2, and WireGuard connection protocols (for apps and manual setups) to connect to the VPN servers safely.

Other Surfshark features include Kill Switch, Pause VPN, Dynamic MultiHop (customizable double VPN), Auto-connect, Invisible or LAN Rotating IP, GPS spoofing, smart DNS, Route via VPN and Bypasser (split tunnelling). Surfshark offers an ad and tracker prevention feature, CleanWeb, which blocks video ads, annoying banners and cookie pop-ups. Surfshark also allows unlimited simultaneous connections.

== Research ==
In 2019 Surfshark conducted research evaluating the Digital Quality of Life (DQL) and wellbeing of online users. The research is updated annually, selecting the best-performing countries based on internet affordability, quality, electronic infrastructure, security, and government. Aside from the DQL research, Surfshark investigates worldwide social media censorship, internet shutdowns, and government surveillance. New data is added as soon as the internet connection gets disrupted in any of the countries, or strict government surveillance invades the privacy of the internet users. Surfshark collected information about internet regulations, global data breaches, or data vulnerabilities during the study.

== Partnerships ==
Surfshark is one of the founding members of the VPN Trust Initiative, which was established in 2020. All members must follow the VTI principles, ensuring that member companies are secure, trusted, and transparent to their users. In August 2022, Surfshark joined forces with an internet monitoring organization—NetBlocks. The partnership started as a natural alignment of the organizations’ visions and common goals—bringing awareness and gaining more routes to spread the news of worldwide internet disruptions. Together, they also developed a Digital Survival Kit which outlines key steps to prepare for a potential internet shutdown and censorship. In 2022, Surfshark joined the Global Encryption Coalition (GEC) to promote strong encryption. Surfshark also collaborated with the Internet Society to spread awareness about Splinternet and Electronic Frontier Foundation (EFF) to discuss surveillance technologies.

== Recognition ==
=== Audits ===
In November 2018, Surfshark's Chrome and Firefox browser extensions underwent an external audit by a German cybersecurity firm, Cure53. In April 2021, Surfshark's server infrastructure was audited, again by Cure53. In January 2023 and later in June 2025, Surfshark underwent an independent assurance procedure by Deloitte where they verified Surfshark's "no-logs" statement. Surfshark passed an independent security audit, conducted by SecuRing. Surfshark announced the audit had been completed and released its results to the public on January 23, 2026.

=== Awards ===
- TechRadar Work from Home Must-Have App 2021
- VPN Solution of the Year at the CyberSecurity Breakthrough Awards 2022
- CNet Editor's Choice Oct 2022
- CanalTech Most Popular VPN Service 2022 (Brazil)
- PC World Verified Product 2022 (Poland)
- Surfshark Antivirus Virus Bulletin certification 2022
- Trusted Reviews Best VPN 2022
- Forbes Advisor Best VPN for Unlimited Connections 2023
- Independent Advisor Best Value VPN 2023
- TechRadar Recommended 2024
- TechAdvisor Editors' Choice 2024
- Financial Times 1000: Fastest-growing European Companies 2024
- Surfshark Antivirus AV-TEST Top Product 2024
- Financial Times 1000: Fastest-growing European Companies 2025
