= Adaptive website =

Type of website

An adaptive website is a website that builds a model of user activity and modifies the information and/or presentation of information to the user in order to better address the user's needs.

== Overview ==
An adaptive website adjusts the structure, content, or presentation of information in response to measured user interaction with the site, with the objective of optimizing future user interactions. Adaptive websites "are web sites that automatically improve their organization and presentation by learning from their user access patterns." User interaction patterns may be collected directly on the website or may be mined from Web server logs. A model or models are created of user interaction using artificial intelligence and statistical methods. The models are used as the basis for tailoring the website for known and specific patterns of user interaction.

=== Techniques ===
- The collaborative filtering method: Collected user data may be assessed in aggregate (across multiple users) using machine learning techniques to cluster interaction patterns to user models and classify specific user patterns to such models. The website may then be adapted to target clusters of users. In this approach, the models are explicitly created from historic user information with new users are classified to an existing model and a pre-defined mapping is used for existing content and content organization.
- The statistical hypothesis testing method: A/B testing or similar methods are used in conjunction with a library of possible changes to the website or a change-generation method (such as random variation). This results in the automated process website change, impact assessment, and adoption of change. Some examples include genetify for website look and feel, and snap ads for online advertising. In this approach (specifically genetify), the model is represented implicitly in the population of possible sites and adapted for all users that visit the site.

=== Differentiation ===
User landing pages (such as iGoogle) that allow the user to customize the presented content are not adaptive websites as they rely on the user to select rather than the automation of the selection and presentation of the web widget's that appear on the website.

Collaborative filtering such as recommender systems, generate and test methods such as A/B testing, and machine learning techniques such as clustering and classification that are used on a website do not make it an adaptive website. They are all tools and techniques that may be used toward engineering an adaptive website.

== See also ==
- Machine learning
- Responsive web design
- Web intelligence
