= Coveron =

Lithuanian identity theft protection service

Coveron (formerly NordProtect) is an identity theft protection service for individuals, founded in 2024. It was developed by Nord Security (formerly NordSec LTD), the cybersecurity software company that also created NordVPN. Coveron is based and operates under the jurisdiction of the USA. The service is available to residents of the United States, including U.S. territories and the District of Columbia, with the exception of residents of New York.

== History ==
The service was launched as NordProtect at the end of 2024, initially as an integrated tool bundled with NordVPN subscriptions. In March 2025, Nord Security transitioned NordProtect into a standalone subscription product. On May 26, 2026, the brand was renamed to Coveron. Since its inception, Tomas Sinicki has served as the managing director of the brand.

== Services ==
Coveron summarizes its primary functionality into personal data monitoring, identity restoration, and insurance for cybercrime. The platform's monitoring features scan dark web repositories and marketplaces, public criminal records, and short-term loan databases for user-specified personal information, including phone numbers, email addresses, Social Security numbers, and credit or debit card details.

The service sends automated security alerts that notify users of compromised credentials associated with malware infections or known data breaches as well as new credit and financial account activity. Coveron also updates its subscribers on arrests or jail intakes linked to their identity.

The service tracks credit reports and VantageScore® 3.0 credit scores through TransUnion, Experian, and Equifax. This tracking service includes notifying users of suspicious activity such as new inquiries, new users assigned to the credit card, or the opening of new accounts. The credit lock feature is also included, which allows users to restrict third-party access to their TransUnion credit file and prevent unauthorized credit applications.

Beyond credit tracking, the platform monitors financial accounts for changes to bank account signers, new account inquiries, and personal information updates.

Identity restoration and insurance benefits are provided through a partnership with Hartford Steam Boiler (HSB). For users experiencing identity theft, the service provides access to restoration case managers who assist in correcting credit scores and related identity records.

The insurance component covers various eligible costs, including legal fees and document replacement associated with identity recovery, as well as financial losses resulting from online fraud, cyberextortion, and personal cyberattacks.
