= Urbo Bankas =

Lithuanian credit institution

- Formerly: Urbo bankas
- Type: Private company
- Industry: Financial services
- Founded: November 24, 1992; 33 years ago
- Headquarters: Vilnius, Lithuania
- Area served: Lithuania
- Products: Loans, banking services
- Website: urbo.lt

Urbo bankas (UAB) is a Lithuanian bank that provides consumer loans, mortgages and business loans. The company is headquartered in Vilnius, Lithuania.

In 2025, China’s Ministry of Commerce sanctioned the bank as retaliation for European sanctions brought against a Chinese regional bank in relation to supporting Russia’s war effort.

== History ==
The bank started as Medicinos bankas on 24th November 1992 in Vilnius, Lithuania.

Old logo used until February 2024

On 1 February 2024, the bank changed its name to Urbo bankas.

In 2026, the main shareholders were Konstantinas Karos, holding 90.13%, and Western Petroleum Limited, holding 6.61%, own shares acquired by the bank 3,26%

== Sanctions by China ==
On August 13, 2025, China’s Ministry of Commerce announced sanctions against URBO Bankas and Mano Bankas, banning them from engaging in any transactions or cooperation with Chinese individuals or organizations. China characterized the move as retaliation for the EU’s sanctions on two regional Chinese banks (Heihe Rural Commercial Bank and Heilongjiang Suifenhe Rural Commercial Bank), which were included in the EU’s July sanctions package targeting entities supporting Russia’s war effort. On August 14, 2025, the European Union urged China to revoke the sanctions on URBO Bankas, labelling them as "unjustified and baseless". The EU stressed that URBO Bankas has no operations or presence in China, making the sanctions largely symbolic.

== See also ==
- List of banks in Lithuania
