= Artea Bank =

Major commercial bank in Lithuania

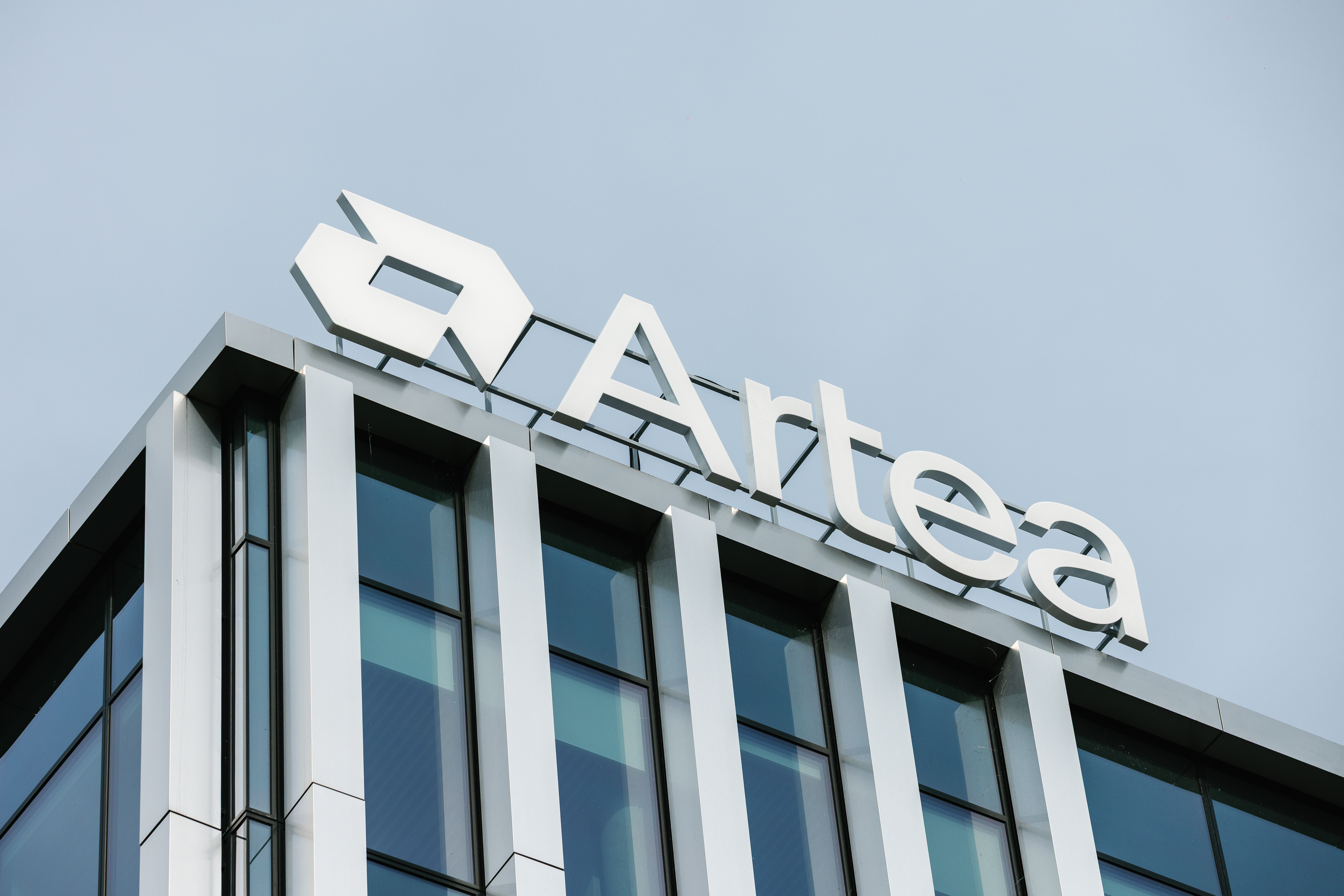
- Artea logo on the Sqveras office complex in Kaunas
- Type: Public company
- Traded as: Nasdaq Baltic: SAB1L
- Industry: Financial services
- Founded: 4 February 1992; 34 years ago
- Headquarters: Šiauliai, Lithuania
- Key people: Vytautas Sinius (Chairman and CEO); Donatas Savickas (Deputy Chairman and CEO; CFO)
- Products: Retail banking, mortgage loans, corporate banking
- Revenue: ▼€156.028 million (2025)
- Operating income: ▼€70.895 million (2025)
- Net income: ▼€60.484 million (2025)
- Total assets: ▲€5.844 billion (2025)
- Owner: Invalda INVL (19,94%), Tesonet (9,86%), EBRD (7,37%)
- Number of employees: 1,137
- Website: www.artea.lt

Artea Bank is a major commercial bank in Lithuania providing retail and commercial banking services.

It has been designated in 2019 as a Significant Institution under the criteria of European Banking Supervision, and as a consequence is directly supervised by the European Central Bank.

== History ==
Artea Bank was established in 1992. The bank took over assets from Ūkio bankas totaling LTL2,7 billion in 2013, for which the European Bank for Reconstruction and Development (EBRD) granted the bank a loan of LTL69 million.

As of 2018 the largest shareholder of the company was the EBRD, owing 26% of the company's stock after converting loans to the bank into shares. In 2021, 18% of the Banks shares held by the EBRD were sold to Invalda INVL, Nord Security and ME investija.

The bank merged Invalda INVL and its retail business in 2023, creating a new company headed by the former INVL Investment Management director.

Since 1994 (in Secondary List) and since 2006 (in Main List), the company is listed in Nasdaq Vilnius. In 2022, the bank reported a profit of over €63 million and a loan portfolio of €2.6 billion.

On May 7, 2025, the general shareholders' meeting decided to change the name to Artea.

== See also ==
- List of banks in the euro area
- List of banks in Lithuania
