= List of banks in Lithuania =

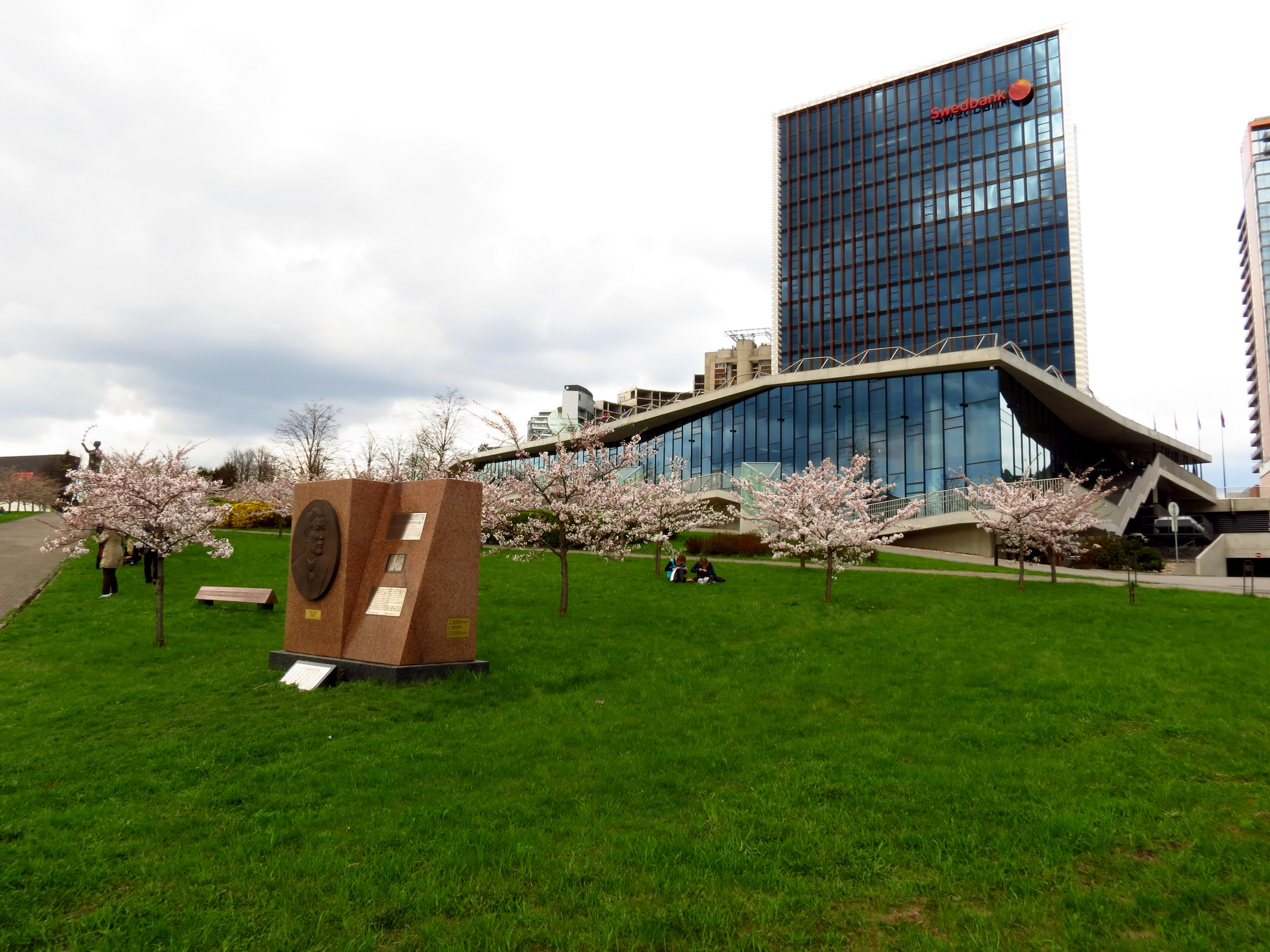
Swedbank branch head office, Vilnius

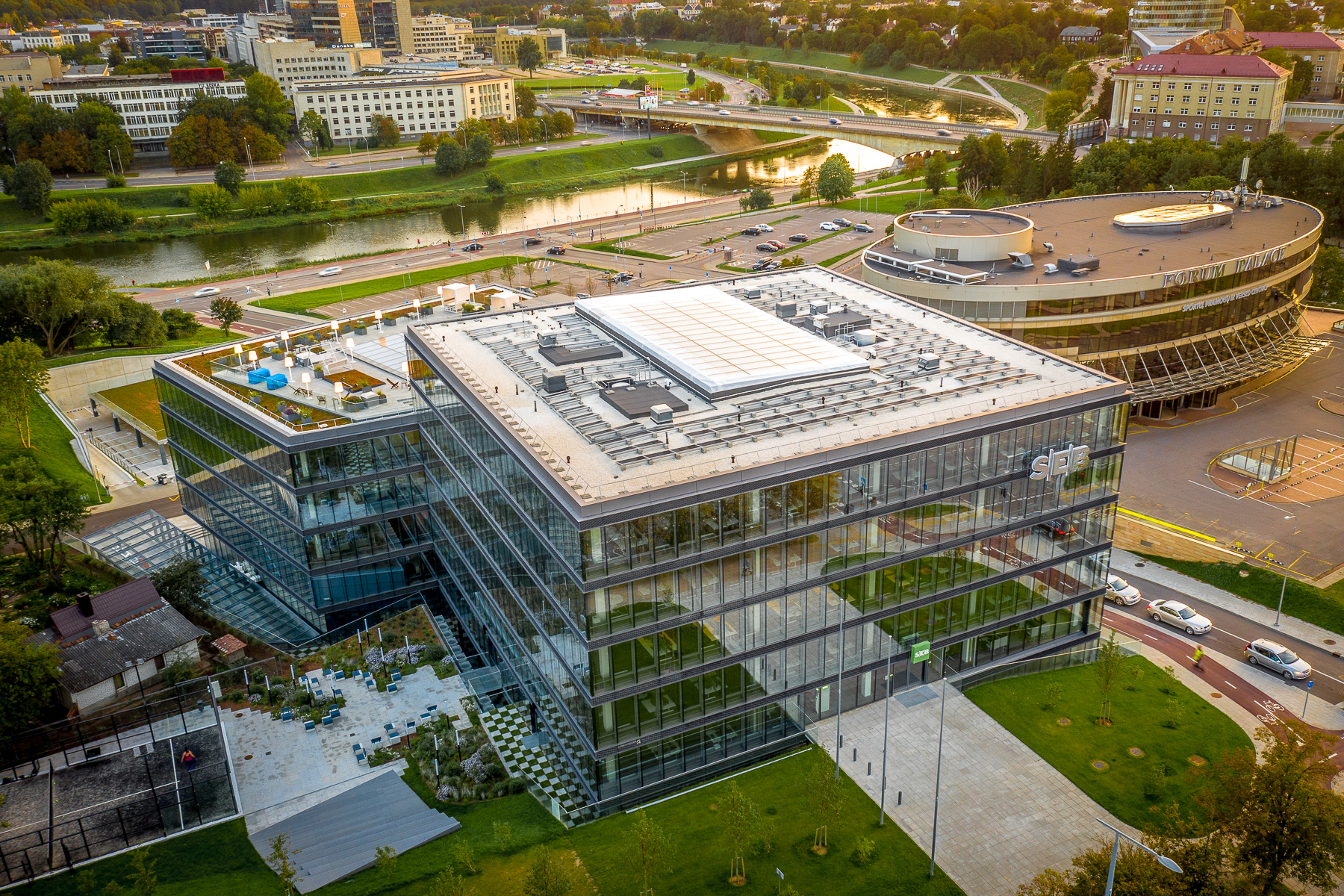
SEB head office, Vilnius

Quadrum office building in Vilnius, local home of both Revolut and Luminor

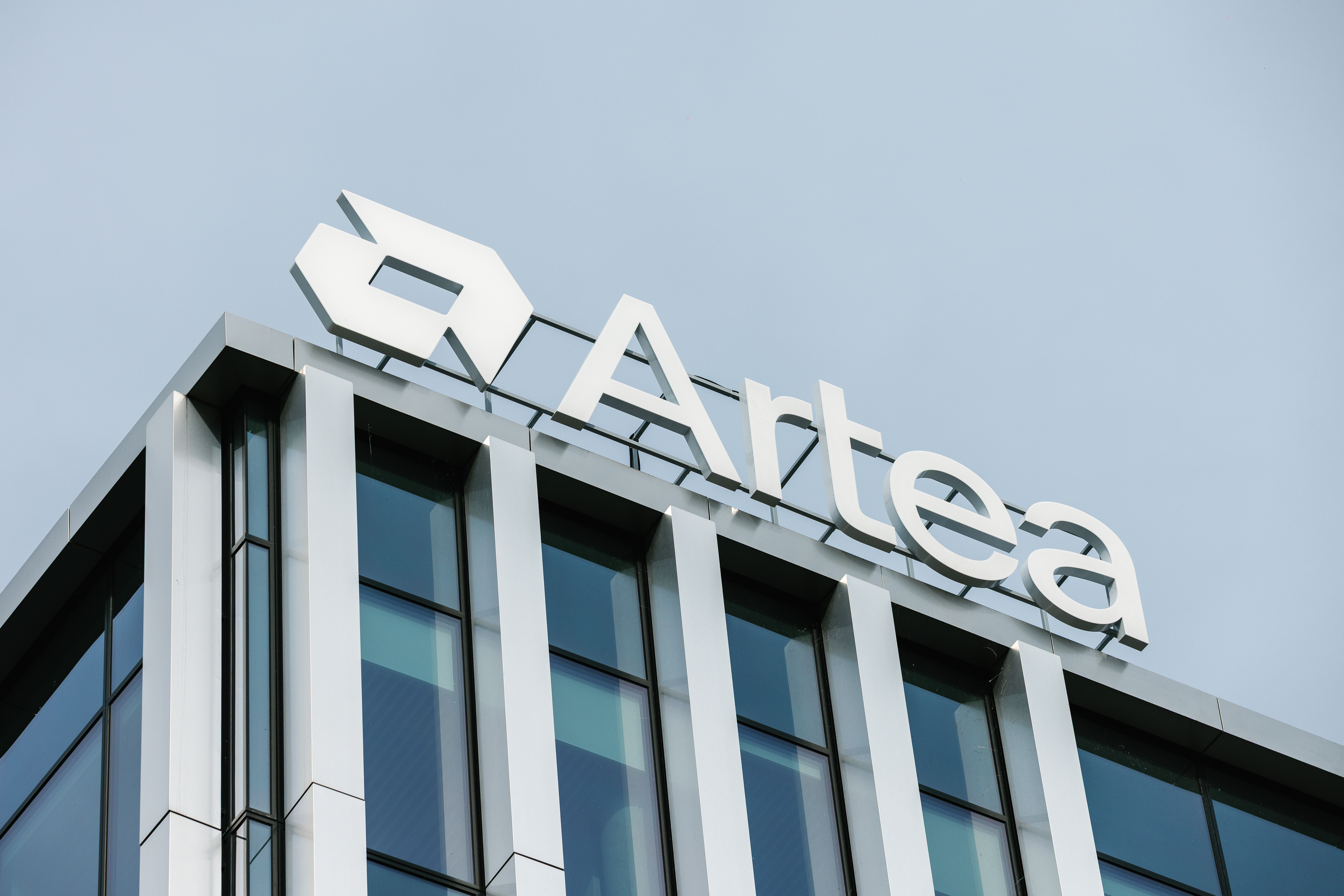
Artea logo on the Sqveras office complex in Kaunas

This list of banks in Lithuania is based on information from Central Bank of Lithuania, responsible for financial supervision in Lithuania.

As of January 2026, Lithuania currently has 20 banks, with six banks holding banking licences, eight banks holding specialised bank licences and another six banks operating as branches of foreign banks. The four largest banks are significant institutions directly supervised by the European Central Bank.

== Policy framework ==
Lithuanian banking sector is to be understood within the framework of the European single market and European banking union, which means that Lithuania's banking system is more open to cross-border banking operations than peers outside of the EU.

European banking supervision distinguishes between significant institutions (SIs) and less significant institutions (LSIs), with SI/LSI designations updated regularly by the European Central Bank (ECB). Significant institutions are directly supervised by the ECB using joint supervisory teams that involve the national competent authorities (NCAs) of individual participating countries. Less significant institutions are supervised by the relevant NCA on a day-to-day basis, under the supervisory oversight of the ECB. In Lithuania's case, the NCA is the Bank of Lithuania.

== Commercial banks ==
All institutions licensed to operate in the country presented here by licensing type and total assets.

=== Significant institutions ===
The four largest banks registered in the country (significant institutions) are directly supervised by the ECB in conjunction with experts from the Bank of Lithuania:

- Revolut Holdings Europe UAB, subsidiary of Revolut
- Swedbank AB, subsidiary of Swedbank Baltics AS, subsidiary of Swedbank
- SEB bankas AB, subsidiary of SEB Group
- Artea Bankas AB, known until May 2025 as Šiaulių Bankas

A study published in 2024 assessed that Swedbank was the bank with most aggregate assets in Lithuania (as opposed to total consolidated assets), with €18.5 billion as of end-2023, followed by SEB (€13.8 billion), Revolut (€12.1 billion), and Šiaulių (now Artea, €4.6 billion).

=== Less significant institutions ===
Banks

The two remaining institutions that hold full banking licences in Lithuania are:

- Urbo Bankas UAB, formerly known as Medicinos bankas
- PayRay Bank UAB

Specialised Banks

- Mano Bankas AB
- SME Bank UAB
- European Merchant Bank UAB
- GF bankas UAB, formerly General Financing, subsidiary of Marginalen Bank, Sweden
- Saldo bank UAB, (Finnish capital)
- Fjord Bank AB
- Finora Bank UAB, subsidiary of the Estonian bank
- RATO bankas UAB, formerly RATO kredito unija

=== Branches of foreign banks ===
Currently, the following branch offices of foreign banks are operating under licensed supervision in the country:

- Luminor Bank AS
- OP Corporate Bank plc
- Citadele Banka AS
- Bigbank AS
- Inbank AS
- TF Bank AB

As of October 2025, there were no branches of banks located outside the European Economic Area ("third-country branches" in EU parlance) in Lithuania, based on data compiled by the European Banking Authority.

== Credit unions ==
Lithuania is one of six euro-area countries with credit unions, together with Croatia, Estonia, Ireland, Latvia, and the Netherlands. whereas the Centrinė Kredito Unija is designated as LSI, the other Lithuanian credit unions (Lithuanian: kredito unijos) are outside the scope of the EU Capital Requirements Directives, and thus regulated and supervised under national law. At end-2023, there were 59 such Lithuanian credit unions (including Centrinė Kredito Unija), with total assets of ca. €1.43 billion (US$1.55 billion).

As of 1 September 2025, the ECB's list of 16 Lithuanian LSIs supervised institutions included:

- Lietuvos Centrinė Kredito Unija
- Jungtinė Centrinė Kredito Unija

Of these, only Lietuvos Centrinė Kredito Unija was designated by the ECB as "high-impact" on the basis of several criteria including size.

== Other institutions ==
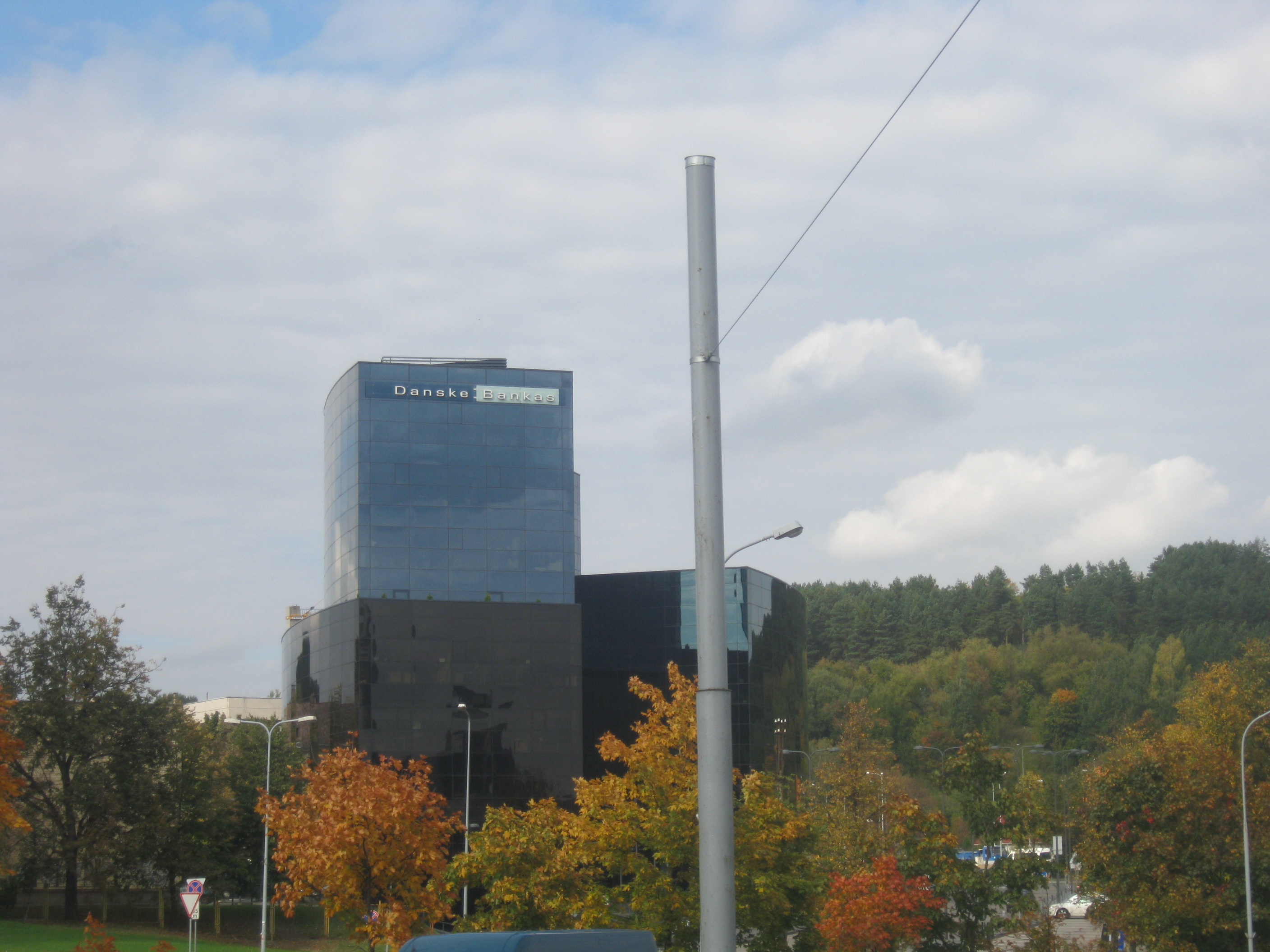
Former headquarters of Danske Bank in Vilnius

The Bank of Lithuania and Asset Bank are public credit institutions that do not hold a banking licence under EU law.

Some other banks, like Danske Bank has competence centres or departments operating for foreign markets from the country.

== Defunct Banks ==
Several former Lithuanian banks, defined as having been headquartered in the present-day territory of Lithuania, are documented on Wikipedia. They are listed below in chronological order of establishment.

- Vilnius Land Bank (1872-1939)
- Trade and Industry Bank (1918-1927)
- Central Jewish Bank (1920-1940)
- Lithuanian Cooperative Bank (1920-1940)
- Lithuanian Land Bank (1924-1940)
- Lithuanian Innovation Bank (1988-1996)
- Ūkio bankas (1989-2013)
- Hermis Bank (1991-2000)
- Litimpeks (1991-1999)
- Naujoji Vilnia Commercial Bank (1991-?)
- Sekundės Bank (1991-1994)
- Tauro Bankas (1991-1997)
- Hansabank (1992-2008)
- Lithuanian State Commercial Bank (1992-1998)
- Snoras (1992-2011)
- Lithuanian Development Bank (1994-2000)

== See also ==
- List of banks in the euro area
- List of banks in Europe
