= Surfshark Antivirus =

Cybersecurity software

- Developer: Surfshark
- Initial release: Surfshark version 3.0.0 (released August 4, 2021)
- Stable release: Windows version 4.0 (released April 27, 2022), macOS version 4.0 (released April 11, 2022), Android 2.7.4 version (released August 4, 2021)
- Operating system: Windows, Android, and macOS
- Available in: English, Deutsch, Español, Français, Italiano, Polski, Português (Brasil), Русский, Українська, 한국어, 简体中文, 中文, 日本語.
- Type: Computer security software
- License: Proprietary software
- Website: https://www.surfshark.com/antivirus

Surfshark Antivirus is a cybersecurity software developed by a company known for Surfshark and internet security services. Surfshark Antivirus offers real-time protection, webcam protection and provides protection against malware, viruses, and other cyber threats.

== Technology ==
In 2021, Antivirus software was introduced to its Surfshark One bundle. Surfshark Antivirus offers real-time protection to users by scanning and identifying potential threats on devices. It integrates with Surfshark's other security products, including its VPN services. The antivirus is available for multiple platforms, including Windows 10 and later systems, macOS versions starting with Big Sur 11 and onwards, and Androiddevices running OS 10 or later.

It offers real-time protection, monitoring systems around the clock to guard against malware, while operating in the background. Surfshark Antivirus also uses heuristic detection that scans files and process' for suspicious-looking bits of code. In December 2022, Surfshark added webcam protection to its antivirus tool to control exactly which apps are allowed to use the webcam.

== Overview ==
Surfshark Antivirus is an antivirus software that includes real-time protection, scan-scheduling, webcam protection, malware detection, and malware removal. It is part of the Surfshark app and comes with the Surfshark One and One+ bundles. Antivirus can be used on up to five devices. The user can see the list of Antivirus-protected devices on their Surfshark profile page.

== Features ==
=== Scanning ===
Scanning is a feature that scans all files stored on the device, including system and application files, including those the user can’t see. When malware is detected, the user is presented with a list of potentially harmful files and can select which one they want to delete.

The antivirus application automatically copies each infected file to the quarantine folder for backup. If the backup process is unsuccessful, the file is renamed by changing the extension to “.infected.” Available on Windows, macOS, and Android.

=== Scheduling ===
Scheduling is a feature that lets users choose the date and time of their device scans. Windows and macOS users can schedule both Quick scans and Full scans. Available on Windows, macOS, and Android.

=== Quarantine ===
Quarantine is a feature that automatically isolates potentially harmful files found after a scan or real-time detection so they aren’t executable. Users can delete or restore the files and add them to the exclusion list. Available on Windows, and macOS.

=== Exclusions ===
Exclusions is a feature that allows users to choose which files and folders aren’t going to be scanned. Available on Windows, and macOS.

=== Webcam protection ===
Webcam protection is a feature will stop untrusted apps from accessing your webcam. The user is informed when an untrusted app tries to access the camera. Available on Windows and macOS.

=== Ransomware shield ===
Ransomware shield is a feature that provides added security to specified files and folders. The user selects which apps have permission to access their files. When an app that doesn’t have permission is accessing the files in the protected folder, the action is blocked, and the user is asked to allow access or to block it. Available on macOS.

=== Surfshark Cloud Protect ===
Surfshark Cloud Protect is a feature that scans unknown files on the cloud for zero-day threats. The feature is based on a machine learning system where unknown file hashes are sent to a remote cloud server that quickly analyzes if the file is malicious.

If the file is found to be dangerous, then all Surfshark user’s apps are updated, so this new threat is quarantined. Available on Windows, macOS, and Android.

== Certification ==
=== AV-Test ===
In November and December 2022 and again in May through June in 2024, Surfshark Antivirus for Windows (versions 4.4 & 4.5) received certification from AV-Test, an independent IT-Security Institute from Magdeburg, Germany.

=== ATP Test ===
In May and June 2024 Surfshark passed the Advanced Threat Protection test or ATP test for short, conducted by the experts from AV-Test.

=== VB100 Virus Bulletin certificates ===
Surfshark Antivirus was tested by the Virus Bulletin on four different occasions: May 23, 2022; July 25, 2022; October 24, 2022; January 23, 2023.

== Reviews ==
In February 2023, Surfshark Antivirus was certified as an efficient antivirus by the antivirus testing establishment AV-TEST, an independent antivirus evaluation organization.

Computer Bild, a German computer magazine, reviewed Surfshark Antivirus, highlighting its comprehensive protection against viruses and malware, user-friendly interface, and its inclusion in the Surfshark One package, which also offers VPN services, private search functionality, and alert services for enhanced online security.

TechRadar, in its review, noted that it effectively protects devices from malware and viruses on Android and Windows with real-time protection and flexible scanning options.

PC Mag, a British computer media, reviewed Surfshark Antivirus, noting its significant improvements in malware protection, but also pointing out the need for further refinement in its antivirus capabilities.
