= Personal information removal service =

Internet privacy service

A personal information removal service is designed to help individuals reduce their digital footprint by removing their private data from the internet, particularly from data brokers and people search websites. These services cater to internet users' concerns over data privacy and data brokers' widespread collection and sale of personal information.

== Background ==
Data brokers collect and sell people’s personal information, often without the individual's consent. This data includes names, addresses, and browsing habits, which can then be used for targeted advertising and risk assessment or even sold to third parties. Data protection regulations like the GDPR and CCPA allow consumers to make takedown and deletion requests. However, these regulations do not prevent data brokers from initially collecting the data. The proliferation of data brokers has led to an increased demand for services that can help individuals in regaining control of their personal data.

== Functionality ==
Personal information removal services work by identifying and requesting data brokers to delete the personal information of their clients. This process can be manual or fully automated, but it is nevertheless complex because it involves dealing with numerous data brokers, each with different policies and procedures for data removal.

Companies offering personal information removal also face some issues. They struggle to ensure comprehensive data removal as new data brokers emerge and existing ones don’t always comply with removal requests. Most of them are also limited to certain regions or countries.
