= Hostinger =

Lithuanian web hosting company

- Former name: Hosting Media (2004–2011)
- Company type: Private
- Founded: 2004 as Hosting Media
- Headquarters: Vilnius, Lithuania
- Area served: Worldwide
- Chairperson: Arnas Stuopelis
- CEO: Giedrius Zakaitis
- Key people: Daugirdas Jankus, Deputy CEO; Kristina Strimaitė, CMO; Domantas Beržanskis, CFO; Aivaras Šimkus, COO
- Industry: Web hosting
- Services: Web hosting, shared hosting, cloud hosting, VPS, email, Minecraft hosting, Windows VPS, managed WordPress hosting, domains
- Revenue: €275.4 million (2025)
- Employees: 1000+ (2026)
- Subsidiaries: Hosting24; Niagahoster
- Website: hostinger.com

Hostinger is a Lithuanian web hosting company headquartered in Vilnius.

== History ==
Hostinger was founded in Kaunas in 2004 as Hosting Media. In 2007, Hosting Media founded a free web hosting service, 000webhost. In 2008, the company launched Hosting24, a cPanel-based web hosting brand with data centers located in Asheville, North Carolina, US, and the United Kingdom. In 2011, Arnas Stuopelis joined the company as CEO. In the same year, Hosting Media renamed as Hostinger. In 2013, Hostinger launched its subsidiary Niagahoster in Indonesia. In 2014, the company launched a Brazilian subsidiary, Weblink. In 2019, Hostinger introduced a no-code, drag-and-drop website builder Zyro.

In 2021, ConHostinger acquired a 31% stake in Hostinger. In the same year, Hostinger joint-founded the Lithuanian unicorn association, Unicorns Lithuania.

In 2023, Daugirdas Jankus became Hostinger CEO. Arnas Stuopelis continues as Chairman of the Board. In 2024, 000webhost, a free web hosting brand powered by Hostinger, shut down its operations.

== Philanthropy ==
Hostinger sponsors the organization Save the Children Lithuania, which began in 2020 to contribute computers and other homeschooling tools to the charity organization Mokykla Namuose. In 2021, Hostinger sponsored the prize for the most innovative idea in the Technorama 2021 competition and rebuilt a school in Sumba, Indonesia.

== Reception ==
In 2015, a security researcher discovered a collection of 13 million leaked plaintext passwords belonging to users of 000Webhost. 000Webhost addressed the breach in a Facebook post citing an exploit in an old version of PHP. Security firm Netcraft reported in 2015 that 90% of Steam phishing sites they stopped were hosted by Hostinger. Netcraft reported they stopped 1,400 Steam phishing URLs in one month comprising 331 different websites, all hosted by Hostinger. On the Review Signal blog in 2017, the authors accused Hostinger of manipulating review ratings via reviews by company employees. In 2019, a data breach happened and according to Hostinger, it affected approximately 14 million customers.

In 2022, Hostinger's website preview feature was exploited by criminals via phishing sites. It was reported that once an account is created with Hostinger, the preview URLs are active for a maximum of 120 hours allowing phishing sites to proliferate. In 2023, the Cybercrime Information Center reported that Hostinger entered the top five phishing hosts as measured by their Phishing Attack Score. By April 2026 Hostinger had dropped out of the top 20. The Phishing Attack Score takes into account the raw number of phishing attacks relative to the size of the Hosting Network.
