= Web intelligence =

Area of scientific research and development

Web intelligence is the area of scientific research and development that explores the roles and makes use of artificial intelligence and information technology for new products, services and frameworks that are empowered by the World Wide Web.

The term was coined in a paper written by Ning Zhong, Jiming Liu Yao and Y.Y. Ohsuga in the Computer Software and Applications Conference in 2000.

== Research ==
The research about the web intelligence covers many fields – including data mining (in particular web mining), information retrieval, pattern recognition, predictive analytics, the semantic web, web data warehousing – typically with a focus on web personalization and adaptive websites.
