= Incogni =

Data-removal service

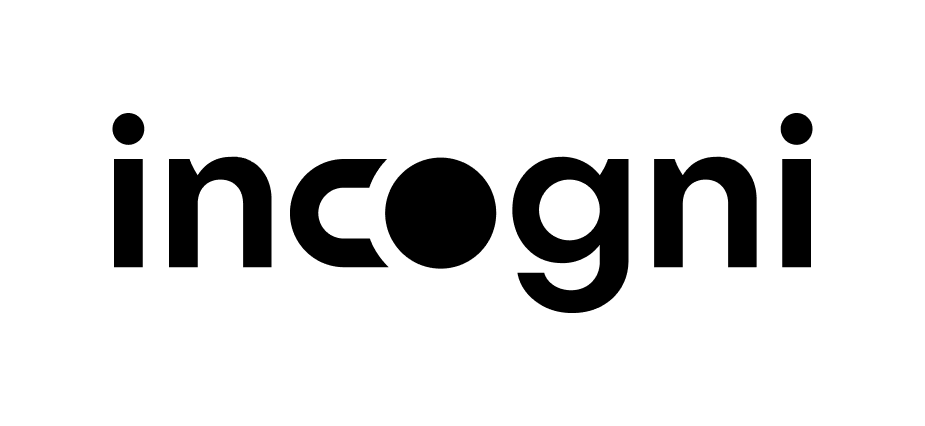
- Website type: Data-removal service
- Available in: English
- Website: https://incogni.com
- Commercial: yes
- Launched: 2022
- Current status: Active

Incogni is a subscription-based personal information removal service that automates opt-out and deletion requests to public and private data brokers on behalf of users. The service was created by Surfshark in 2021 and launched publicly in 2022; it was later offered as a standalone product.

== History ==
Incogni originated at Surfshark in 2021 and launched publicly in January 2022. In 2025, the company introduced a Custom Removals feature that lets subscribers submit links to websites outside the automated broker list for human-assisted takedowns.

In August 2025, Deloitte Lietuva UAB issued an independent limited assurance report (ISAE 3000) over Incogni's stated processes. As of 18 July 2025, the report concluded, among other things, that Incogni:

- covered at least 420 data-broker websites and private databases
- received removal confirmations from those brokers
- sent recurring requests within 60 days for public brokers and within 90 days for private brokers
- had processed more than 245 million removal requests since January 2022

== Technology ==
Incogni acts as a privacy proxy that sends and tracks data-removal requests to a network of data brokers and people-search sites. Reviews note that it relies on privacy laws such as the GDPR (EU), the CCPA (US), and PIPEDA (Canada). According to the Deloitte assurance report, by July 2025, the service covered more than 420 brokers, with recurring follow-ups every 60–90 days depending on broker type, and had processed more than 245 million removal requests.

== Availability ==
Incogni operates in jurisdictions with privacy regulations that enable opt-out/deletion requests. As of 2025, independent reviews and company materials list availability in the United States, Canada, the United Kingdom, the European Economic Area, Switzerland, Norway, Iceland, Liechtenstein, and the Isle of Man.

== Reception ==
In 2025, both PC World and PCMag awarded Incogni their Editors' Choice recommendations. Both reviews highlighted Incogni's Custom Removals feature, with PCWorld noting that "there is no other service on the market that gives its customers the same individualized attention."

TechRadar stated that Incogni was available at "a reasonable price with" a decent array of features," while noting drawbacks such as limited support and lack of a free trial. Comparitech described it as "a personal information removal service" that "handles multiple official data removal requests on your behalf" and "provides ... visibility into data brokers' responses," but observed that it "won't confirm the data broker actually complied with the request." In 2025, Security.org rated Incogni 9.7/10, and All About Cookies gave it 4.9/5, highlighting the introduction of custom removals and noting that Incogni's key claims had been verified by Deloitte.

== Accreditation ==
In 2025, Incogni attained the Better Business Bureau's (BBB's) accreditation, reflecting, among other things, Incogni's "commitment to mak[ing] a good faith effort to resolve any consumer complaints". Incogni maintains an A+ rating with the BBB.

Also in 2025, Incogni completed its SOC 2 (System and Organization Control 2) Type 2 examination with the American Institute of CPAs (AICPA), demonstrating its commitment to data security, availability, processing integrity, confidentiality, and privacy.
