= Access Now =

Non-profit organization

- Formation: 2009
- Founders: Brett Solomon, Cameran Ashraf, Sina Rabbani and Kim Pham
- Website: accessnow.org

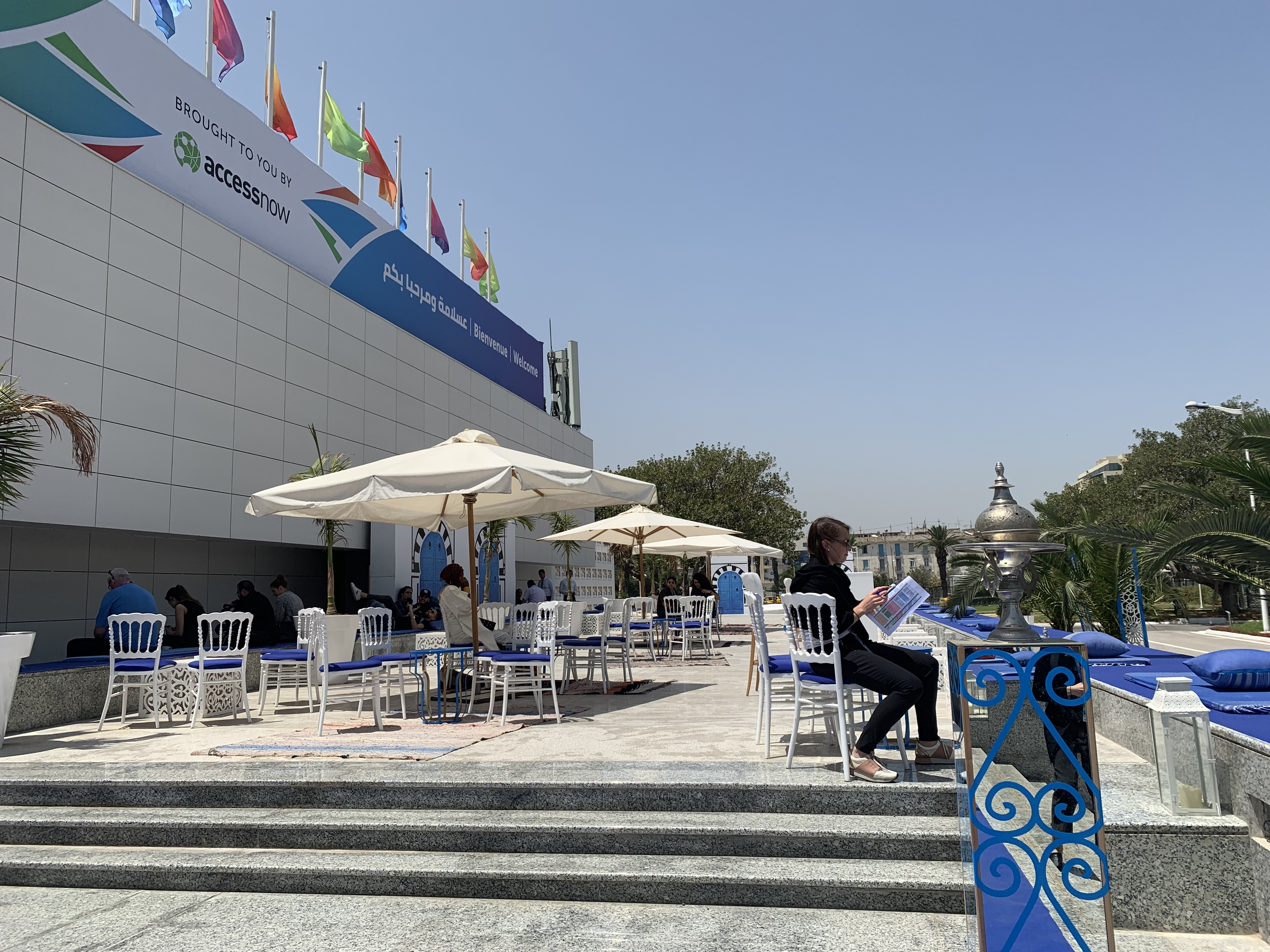
RightsCon 2019 conference venue in Tunis

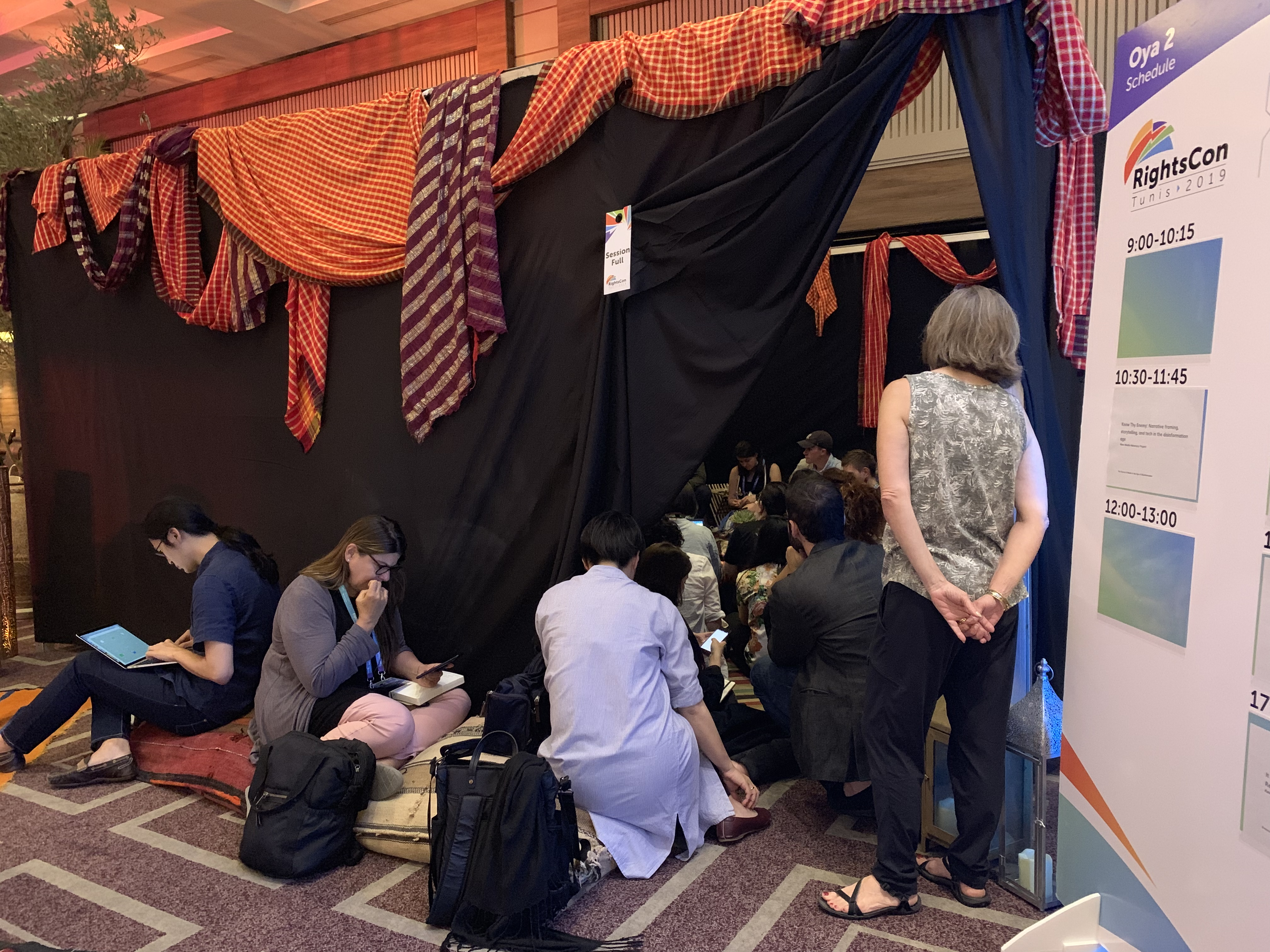
A room hosting a RightsCon session organized by Access Now in 2019

Access Now is an international non-profit organization headquartered in New York City. It was founded in California in July 2009 and focuses on digital civil rights. The organization issues reports on global Internet censorship, and hosts the annual RightsCon human rights conference. It is a registered 501(c)(3) nonprofit organization. Its headquarters moved to New York in 2022.

== History ==
Access Now was established by Brett Solomon, Cameran Ashraf, Sina Rabbani and Kim Pham in 2009, after the contested Iranian presidential election of that year. During the protests that followed this election, the organization disseminated the video footage which came out of Iran. Access Now has campaigned against internet shutdowns, online censorship, perceived risks to privacy rights in international trade agreements, and government surveillance. Access Now has supported the use of encryption and limited cyber security laws and regulations.

== Operations ==
As of 2025, Access Now is a 501(c)(3) organization based in New York City in the United States, with staff, operations, and activities distributed in Brussels, San José (Costa Rica), Tunis, with further presences in Berlin, Delhi, Nairobi, and Manila.

=== RightsCon ===
Access Now runs the annual RightsCon conference which focuses on issues concerning technology's impact on human rights. The conference was first held in Silicon Valley in 2011, followed by events in Rio de Janeiro, Brazil (2012), Silicon Valley (2014), Manila, Philippines (2015), and Silicon Valley (2016); thus alternating between Silicon Valley and a city in the Global South. After being held in Brussels and Toronto, RightsCon 2019 took place in Tunis, Tunisia (11–14 June). The 2019 RightsCon event gathered activists and stakeholders from all over the globe discussed the intersection between human rights and digitalization by government representatives, tech giants, policymakers, NGOs and independent activists. The discussions were about hate speech and freedom of expression, artificial intelligence, privacy and data security, open government and democracy, access, and many others.

In 2022, the 11th edition of RightsCon was held entirely online across all time zones from June 6 to 10, 2022.

=== #KeepItOn project ===
Through its #KeepItOn project, Access Now makes an annual report and data set on internet shutdowns to track internet shutdowns, social media blockages, and internet slowdowns in countries around the world. This report and data are published every spring. Access Now fights against online repression, and provides grants and support to grassroots organizations to advance the rights of users and communities at risk of digital violations.

==== Methodology ====
Access Now gathers data through the Shutdown Tracker Optimization Project (STOP). This project uses remotely sensed data to initially identify shutdowns, blockages and throttling. Instances are confirmed using news reports, reports from local activists, official government statements, and statements from ISPs, in addition to measurement data shared by internet traffic experts and monitoring groups. Access Now defines Internet shutdowns as "an intentional disruption of the internet or electronic communications rendering them inaccessible or effectively unusable, for a specific population or within a location, often to exert control over the flow of information.". Individual instances are counted if the shutdown lasts longer than one hour.

A 2020 study found that Access Now's data capture fewer false positives but more false negatives compared to expert analysis of internet shutdowns, such as V-Dem Institute's Digital Society Project, or Freedom House's Freedom on the Net. Access Now's data are more likely to miss shutdowns than captured by other methods.

==== Impact ====
#KeepItOn data is used to measure shutdowns by a range of organizations and academic publications. The Millennium Challenge Corporation uses these data as a part of its Freedom of Information indicator on its annual scorecards, used for determining aid allocations. Access Now's reports are also used in calculating the total cost of internet shutdowns. Other articles use these data to track trends in internet censorship in various countries and regions.

==== Digital Security Helpline ====
The organization offers a 24/7 Helpline to advise victims of cyber-crime such as cyber-attacks, spyware campaigns, data theft, and other digital malfeasance, to protect civil society from digital attacks. Starting in 2009, it has offered support and direct technical advice to activists, journalists, and other human rights campaigners who are in need of digital security support, those facing cyber threats and attacks and those in need urgent support. The Digital Security Helpline was officially launched in 2013. Services include digital security guidance on topics such as how to protect against data and credential theft, and preventing targeted cyberattacks.

The Helpline has been credited with helping to build people-first digital infrastructures, and one content moderation request at a time. Supporters claim that the helpline provides lessons on how to build comprehensive and sustainable digital infrastructures while protecting the digital rights of the people they serve, including CSOs, activists, and human rights defenders.

Methods using in-country volunteers to identify attacks from their own governments have been identified as posing a risk of government retribution for those reporting via the helpline and other methods.
