= Microsoft Entra ID =

Cloud-based identity management service

- Developer: Microsoft
- Type: Cloud-based identity management service
- Launched: October 27, 2008; 17 years ago
- Platform: Azure
- Operating system: Windows
- Status: Active
- Website: Official Site

Microsoft Entra ID (formerly known as Microsoft Azure Active Directory or Azure AD) is a cloud-based identity and access management (IAM) solution. It is a directory and identity management service that operates in the cloud and offers authentication and authorization services to various Microsoft services, such as Microsoft 365, Dynamics 365, Microsoft Azure, and third-party services. Entra ID provides users with a single sign-on experience, called "work or school accounts", regardless of whether their applications are cloud-based or on-premises.

Entra ID offers various authentication methods, including password-based, multi-factor, smart card, and certificate-based authentication. It also includes several security features, such as conditional access policies, risk-based authentication, and identity protection.

On July 11, 2023, Microsoft announced the renaming of Azure AD to Microsoft Entra ID to improve consistency with other Microsoft cloud products. The name change took place on July 15, 2023.

== Security ==
On July 14, 2025, a security vulnerability allowing a user to gain administrator privileges to every Entra ID directory was discovered. A fix was issued on July 17, 2025.

== See also ==
- Microsoft Entra Connect
- Active Directory
