= RightsCon =

Conference on digital rights

- Genre: digital rights; human rights
- Frequency: Annual
- Years active: 15
- Inaugurated: October 2011; 15 years ago (as Silicon Valley Human Rights Conference)
- Most recent: February 24, 2025; 20 months ago
- Next event: May 5–8, 2026 (cancelled)
- Attendance: >5,000 (2025)
- Area: International (154 countries in 2025)
- Organiser: Access Now
- Website: www.rightscon.org

RightsCon is an annual conference on digital rights hosted by Access Now. It convenes international leaders and organizations to discuss global problems including internet censorship, the regulation of algorithms, electronic surveillance, the ethics of technology, online hate speech, content moderation, cyberwarfare, and more.

== History ==
RightsCon logo (2018–2023)

The conference was first convened by Access (today, Access Now) in Silicon Valley in 2011, with the intention of gathering civil society to discuss impacts of the growing tech industry on digital rights and human rights. It sought the participation of leaders from both industry (including companies such as Twitter, Google, Mozilla, and Comcast) and civil society organizations (such as the Electronic Frontier Foundation and New America). Keynote speakers included the then-Assistant Secretary of State, Michael Posner; Egyptian blogger and political prisoner, Alaa Abd El-Fattah; and then-director of public policy at Google, Bob Boorstin.

RightsCon organizers have sought to ensure the event is accessible to attendees from across the globe, particularly global majority countries, informing the decision to hold the conference in Asia, the Middle East, and Latin America.

=== Online convenings ===
In 2020, RightsCon was to be held in San José, Costa Rica, but due to the COVID-19 pandemic, the meeting took place in an online format. In 2021, the 10th edition of RightsCon was again held online from Monday, June 7 to Friday, June 11, 2021, due to the continued global COVID-19 pandemic which altered several digital rights physical meetings. The topics for RightsCon2021 included: Artificial Intelligence (AI), automation, data protection and user control, digital futures, democracy, elections, new business models, content control, peacebuilding, censorship, internet shutdowns, freedom of the media and many others were discussed by several digital rights organizations and individuals.

=== 2026 cancellation ===
The 14th RightsCon was scheduled to be held in Lusaka, Zambia from May 5 to 8, 2026. On April 29, 2026, the Zambian government abruptly postponed the conference, writing in a statement that the postponement was "necessitated by the need for comprehensive disclosure […] relating to key thematic issues proposed for discussion during the Summit."

In May 2026, the conference was cancelled due to pressure from the Chinese government. In a statement the same day, Access Now wrote that it was "told that diplomats from the People's Republic of China (PRC) were putting pressure on the Government of Zambia because Taiwanese civil society participants were planning to join us in person."

== List of conferences ==
Past RightsCon conferences include:

Year	Location	Date	Reported participants	Participating countries	Website
2026	Lusaka	May 5-8	Cancelled		Website
2025	Taipei	February 24–27	5,600+	154	Website
2023	San José, Costa Rica	June 5–9	8,300+	169	Website
2022	Online	June 6–10	9,300+	162	Website
2021	Online	June 7–11	9,200+	164	Website
2020	Online	July 27–31	7,600+	158	Website
2019	Tunis	June 11–14	2,750+	122	Website
2018	Toronto	May 16–18	2,500+	118	Website
2017	Brussels	March 29–31	1,500+	105	Website
2016	Silicon Valley	March 30-April 1	1,100+	84	Website
2015	Manila	March 24–25	650+	40	Website
2014	Silicon Valley	March 3–5	700+	65	Website
2012	Rio de Janeiro	May 31-June 1	400+	30	Website
2011	Silicon Valley	October 25–26	400+		Website
