= NordVPN =

Virtual private network provider

- Developer: Nord Security s.a.
- Release: February 13, 2012; 14 years ago
- Stable release: Android 8.26 (December 10, 2025; 11 months ago) [±] iOS 8.59 (December 10, 2025; 11 months ago) [±] macOS 9.10 (December 11, 2025; 11 months ago) [±] Windows 7.54 (December 15, 2025; 11 months ago) [±] Linux 4.3.1 (December 18, 2025; 11 months ago) [±] tvOS 1.12 (October 13, 2025; 13 months ago) [±]
- Operating system: Android; iOS; Linux; macOS; Windows; Android TV; tvOS; ChromeOS
- Platform: Personal Computer; Smartphone; Router; Smart TV; Apple TV
- Type: Virtual Private Network
- License: Proprietary server and client except Linux client: GPLv3 only github.com/NordSecurity/nordvpn-linux
- Website: nordvpn.com
- Repository: github.com/NordSecurity/nordvpn-linux

NordVPN is a Lithuanian VPN service incorporated in Panama. Founded in 2012, NordVPN is developed by the Dutch company Nord Security (formerly Nordsec Ltd), a division of Cyberspace B.V. Nord Security is a cybersecurity software company operating within the broader network of Tesonet, a Lithuanian startup accelerator and business incubator. Its offices are located in Lithuania, the United Kingdom, Panama, and the Netherlands.

The service has applications for Microsoft Windows, macOS, Linux, Android, iOS, Android TV, and tvOS.

== History ==
NordVPN was established in 2012 by a group of childhood friends, with Eimantas Sabaliauskas and Tomas Okmanas at the helm. It presented an Android app in late May 2016, followed by an iOS app in June of the same year. In October 2017, it launched a browser extension for Google Chrome. The service launched applications for Android TV in 2018 and tvOS in 2023. As of January 2026, NordVPN operates 8,000+ servers covering 224 countries.

In March 2019, it was reported that NordVPN received a directive from Russian authorities to join a state-sponsored registry of banned websites, which would prevent Russian NordVPN users from circumventing state censorship. NordVPN was reportedly given one month to comply, or face blocking by Russian authorities. The provider declined to comply with the request and shut down its Russian servers on April 1.

In September 2019, NordVPN announced NordVPN Teams, a VPN solution aimed at small and medium businesses, remote teams, and freelancers who need secure access to work resources. Two years later, NordVPN Teams rebranded as NordLayer and moved toward SASE business solutions.

On October 29, 2019, NordVPN announced additional audits and a public bug bounty program. The bug bounty was launched in December 2019, offering researchers monetary rewards for reporting critical flaws in the service.

In December 2019, NordVPN became one of the five founding members of the newly formed VPN Trust Initiative, promising to promote online security as well as more self-regulation and transparency in the industry. In 2020, the initiative announced five key areas of focus: security, privacy, advertising practices, disclosure and transparency, and social responsibility.

In August 2020, Troy Hunt, an Australian web security expert and founder of Have I Been Pwned?, announced a partnership with NordVPN as a strategic advisor.

In 2022, NordVPN closed its physical servers in India in response to the CERT-In's order for VPN companies to store consumers' personal data for a period of five years.

In April 2022, NordVPN's parent company Nord Security raised $100 million in a round of funding led by Novator. The company's valuation reached $1.6 billion. In September 2023, the company grew and raised more funding, making it valued at $3 billion.

In 2022, Surfshark and Nord Security merged under one holding company.

In July 2024, at the request of Russian federal agency Roskomnadzor, Apple removed NordVPN from the Russian App Store. The company later confirmed that it had fully exited the Russian market.

As of 2026, Nord Security reported having over 20 million users across its products, while NordVPN accounted for approximately 15 million users.

== Technology ==
NordVPN has desktop applications for Windows, macOS, and Linux, as well as mobile apps for Android, iOS and Android TV app. Subscribers also get access to encrypted proxy extensions for Chrome, Edge and Firefox browsers. Subscribers can connect up to six devices simultaneously. NordVPN has released its Linux client under the terms of the GPLv3 only.

In November 2018, NordVPN claimed that its no-log policy was verified through an audit by PricewaterhouseCoopers AG.

In 2021, NordVPN completed an application security audit, carried out by a security research group VerSprite. VerSprite performed penetration testing and, according to the company, found no critical vulnerabilities. One flaw and a few bugs that were found in the audit have since been patched.

In October 2020, NordVPN started rolling out its first colocated servers in Finland to secure the hardware perimeter. The RAM-based servers are fully owned and operated by NordVPN in an attempt to keep full control.

In December 2020, NordVPN initiated a network-wide rollout of 10 Gbit/s servers, upgrading from the earlier 1 Gbit/s standard. The company's servers in Amsterdam and Tokyo were the first to support 10 Gbit/s, and by December 21, 2020, over 20% of the company's network had been upgraded.

In January 2022, NordVPN released an open-source VPN speed testing tool, available for download from GitHub.

In late 2023, NordVPN unveiled a dedicated app for tvOS immediately after Apple started supporting third-party VPN applications with the release of tvOS 17.

Soon after, at the beginning of March 2024, NordVPN announced virtual server support in 50 new locations where physical servers were limited.

In September 2024, NordVPN launched post-quantum encryption support for its Linux app.

=== Anti-malware tools ===
In February 2022, NordVPN introduced an antivirus functionality available as part of the regular VPN license. The opt-in feature blocked web trackers, warned users about malicious websites, and blocked downloaded files that contain malware. In May 2026, NordVPN rebranded its Threat Protection Pro feature as a next-gen antivirus. It works similarly to its predecessor, with a few upgrades.

The feature is available on the Windows and macOS apps and works without connecting to a VPN server.

=== Protocols ===
For encryption, NordVPN has been using the OpenVPN and Internet Key Exchange v2/IPsec technologies in its applications and also introduced its proprietary NordLynx technology in 2019. NordLynx is a VPN tool based on the WireGuard protocol, which aims for better performance than the IPsec and OpenVPN tunneling protocols. According to tests performed by Wired UK, NordLynx produces "speed boosts of hundreds of MB/s under some conditions."

In April 2020, NordVPN announced the gradual roll-out of the WireGuard-based NordLynx protocol on all its platforms. The wider implementation was preceded by a total of 256,886 tests, which included 47 virtual machines on nine different providers, in 19 cities, and eight countries. The tests showed higher average download and upload speeds than both OpenVPN and IKEv2. NordVPN once used L2TP/IPSec and Point-to-Point Tunneling Protocol (PPTP) connections for routers, but these were later removed, as they were largely outdated and insecure.

In 2025, NordVPN launched a new VPN protocol called NordWhisper. It was introduced as a way to get around networks that limit traditional VPN traffic. NordWhisper is meant to mimic regular web traffic, blend in, and make it more difficult for network filters to identify and block it.

=== Additional features ===
Besides general-use VPN servers, the provider offers servers for specific purposes, including P2P sharing, double encryption, and connection to the Tor anonymity network. NordVPN offers three subscription plans: monthly, yearly and bi-yearly.

In November 2020, NordVPN launched a feature that scans the dark web to determine if a user's personal credentials have been exposed. When the Dark Web Monitor feature finds any leaked credentials, it sends a real-time alert, prompting the user to change the affected passwords.

In June 2022, NordVPN launched the Meshnet feature that allows users to create their own private network by linking up to 60 devices. Some of the promoted use cases include file sharing between different devices, multiplayer gaming, and virtual routing. In 2023, NordVPN made the Meshnet feature free to use.

Coveron, an identity theft protection service, was initially launched in 2024 as a bundle with NordVPN. It has since become a separate subscription product.

=== No-logs claims ===
To verify its no-logs claims, NordVPN has undergone multiple independent audits. The first audit was conducted in November 2018 when NordVPN's no-log policy was verified by PricewaterhouseCoopers.

In 2020, NordVPN underwent a second security audit by PricewaterhouseCoopers. The testing focused on NordVPN's Standard VPN, Double VPN, Obfuscated (XOR) VPN, P2P servers, and the product's central infrastructure. The audit confirmed that the company's privacy policy was upheld and the no-logging policy was followed.

Subsequent no-logs audits were performed by Deloitte in 2022, 2023, and 2024. In addition to the no-logs policy audit, NordVPN underwent independent security audits of its applications and server infrastructure.

== Reception ==
Several publications, including Tom's Guide, PC Magazine, CNET, and TechRadar have reviewed NordVPN. Most noted that NordVPN's features such as choosing server location, and speed are good. They also noted the service's high price compared to others in the category.

=== Criticism ===
On October 21, 2019, a security researcher disclosed on Twitter a server breach of NordVPN involving a leaked private key. The cyberattack granted the attackers root access, which was used to generate an HTTPS certificate that enabled the attackers to perform man-in-the-middle attacks to intercept the communications of NordVPN users. In response, NordVPN confirmed that one of its servers based in Finland was breached in March 2018, but there was no evidence of an actual man-in-the-middle attack ever taking place. The exploit was the result of a vulnerability in a contracted data center's remote administration system that affected the Finland server between January 31 and March 20, 2018. Evidence suggests that when the data center became aware of the intrusion, all accounts that had caused the vulnerabilities were deleted and NordVPN was not notified about the mistake.

According to NordVPN, the data center disclosed the breach to NordVPN on April 13, 2019, and NordVPN ended its relationship with the data center. In addition, experts state that there are no indications of any user's private information such as user credentials, billing details, or any other profile-related information being compromised during that event. Security researchers and media outlets criticized NordVPN for failing to promptly disclose the breach after the company became aware of it. NordVPN stated that the company initially planned to disclose the breach after it completed the audit of its 5,000 servers for any similar risks and later put regular updates on its blog.

On November 1, 2019, in a separate incident, it was reported that approximately 2,000 usernames and passwords of NordVPN accounts were exposed through credential stuffing.

In 2019, the Advertising Standards Authority (United Kingdom) (ASA) advised NordVPN not to repeat claims that public WiFi is so insecure it is equivalent to handing out your personal information to the people around you. The ASA ruled that HTTPS already provides "a significant layer of security" and that the impression the ad gave that users were at a significant risk from data theft was erroneous. In 2023, the ASA again ruled against NordVPN, this time over an advertisement which claimed NordVPN could "switch off... malware", holding that, in context, listeners were "likely to understand" it to mean the product would stop all malware, which NordVPN did not substantiate in response to the ASA.

In January 2022, NordVPN updated its policy regarding law enforcement cooperation, according to statements from PCMag and TechRadar. Previously, NordVPN had maintained a strict no-logs policy, preventing any user-identifying data from being stored. The 2023 update clarified that, while the no-logs policy continued, NordVPN would comply with law enforcement requests when required by local legal authorities. This change reflected increased regulatory pressures on VPN providers to support investigations related to cybersecurity and criminal activities.

Privacy advocates expressed concern that this cooperation might compromise user privacy and set a precedent for other VPN services. Critics argued that any law enforcement compliance could challenge NordVPN's commitment to anonymity, while NordVPN, as cited by TechRadar, asserted its dedication to privacy by only responding to legal requests and maintaining minimal data retention. Transparency statements from the company outlined strict compliance conditions, aiming to reassure users about privacy safeguards under the revised policy.

== See also ==
- Comparison of virtual private network services
- Encryption
- Geo-blocking
- Internet privacy
- Secure communication
