= Christianity in Dagestan =

Christianity ranks second in Dagestan in terms of the number of its followers after Islam. There are around 140,000 Christians, including denominations like Russian Orthodoxy, Armenian, Protestant and Catholic.

According to a 2012 survey, in Dagestan 2.4% adheres to the Russian Orthodox Church and 1% are non-denominational Christians.

Estimates of Christians among the non-Slavic indigenous population range from 2,000 to 2,500 thousand. The largest congregation is the Pentecostal Hosanna Evangelical Church in Makhachkala, with more than 1,000 members.

Of the 40 Christian organizations operating as of March 1, 2005, 12 belong to the Russian Orthodox Church.

The position of Christianity, especially Orthodoxy, in Dagestan was significantly influenced by the migration and demographic processes that took place in the second half of the 20th century. Over the past 40 years, the number of peoples professing Christianity in Dagestan has been steadily declining.

The Christian mission in Dagestan periodically faces great difficulties, and some preachers are endangered or simply killed. Protestant and Orthodox missionaries are exposed to a similar danger.

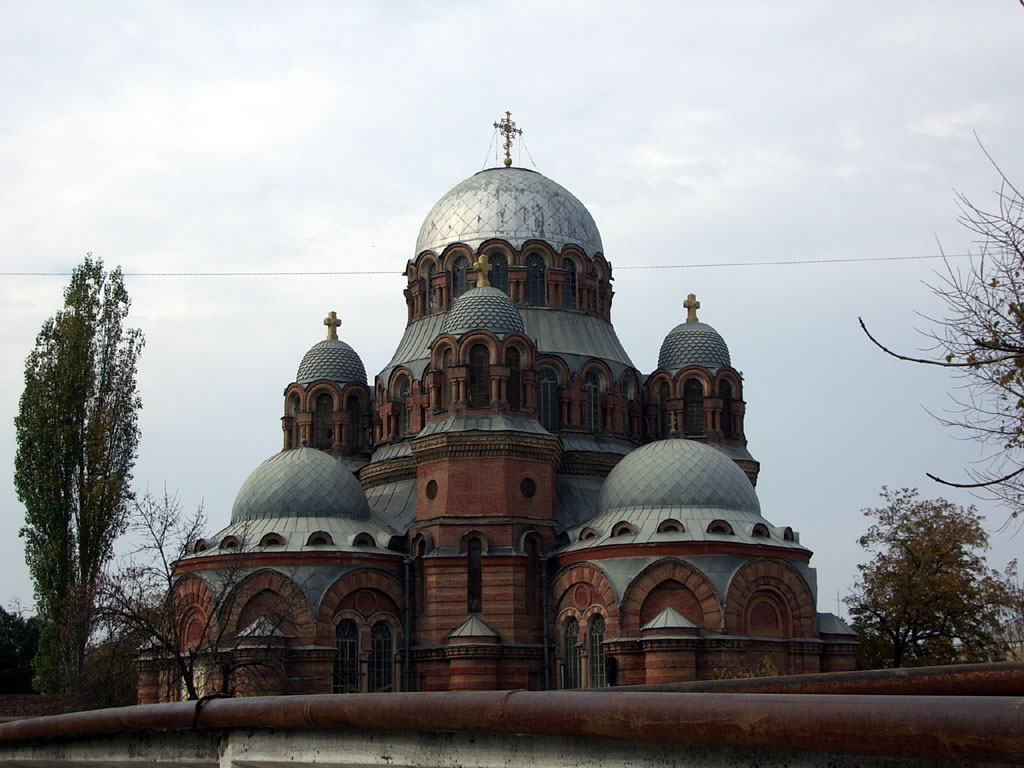
Cathedral of Our Lady of the Sign, Khasavyurt

== History of Christianity in Dagestan ==
The history of Christianity in Dagestan goes back many centuries. The Christian faith came to Dagestan earlier than to Kievan Rus' and went through all stages of development - from heyday to complete decline, and revival, the development of local centers of Christian movements. Conventionally, the penetration and development of Christianity in Dagestan can be divided into several periods: the first centuries of our era - the 14th century, the 18th century - the beginning of the 20th century, the Soviet and the Russian periods.

=== Early period ===
From the first centuries of our era until the 15th century, Christianity of various movements constantly penetrated Dagestan. The central regions of the spread of faith for the Monophysites of Southern Dagestan were the Gregorids communities of Eastern Transcaucasia, for Catholics - the Italian colonies of the Crimea and the Pryazovia region, for the Eastern Orthodoxy - the territory of Georgia. In the 5th-7th centuries, Georgian Christian missionaries spread Orthodoxy in the western regions of Dagestan. During this period, many churches and monasteries were built in Dagestan Oblast. The most famous surviving to this day is the Datuna Church. It was built in the late 10th - early 11th centuries.

Earlier the preachers of Christianity in Dagestan were predominantly Albanians and Georgians missionaries, but in the 8th century the spread of Byzantine Orthodoxy began. The lands of the Khanate were united into the Goths diocese, which was under the omophorion of the Patriarch of Constantinople and headed by the metropolitan, whose see was in the city of Dolos (Crimea).

In 780, the Gothic diocese included seven bishoprics, including Huns - in Dagestan. After the uprising of the Crimean Goths in 787, relations between the two powers cooled, and the Khagan abolished the Gothic diocese. Simultaneously with the Byzantine missionaries, Syrian Nestorians actively preached Christianity in the Caspian region. The position of Nestorianism remained quite strong for several more centuries. Some Dagestan and Khazar Christians remained committed to the Church of Caucasian Albania, and south of Derbent, in the ancient Albania lands, Grigoris (catholicos) was the dominant religion, which even captured Persian colonists and some Lezgins tribes.

In the 13th century, the position of Christianity in Dagestan, in Albania and certain regions of Southern Dagestan (Tabasaransky District), was quite strong. From the beginning of the 14th century, Christianity lost its importance in the Avar Khanate, and during the invasion of Timur in 1395-1396 and the collapse of the centralized kingdom of Georgia, Orthodoxy here gradually gave way to Islam.

=== 18 - early 20 centuries ===
A new stage in the spread of Christianity in the territory of Dagestan begins with its annexation to Russia. There is an active resettlement of Christians from other provinces and the development of lands in the flat and coastal parts. The first settlers were Cossacks, who settled along the banks of the Terek and Sulak. There was also an active attraction of Georgians and Armenians to the territory of Dagestan and the North Caucasus. Often new settlers could not take root in a new place. Thus, at the end of the 18th century, due to oppression from the local Muslim population, Armenians from Derbent and its environs were resettled to the lands of the modern Stavropol Krai.

Most of the settlers professed Orthodoxy. Due to persecution in other regions of Russia, in addition to Orthodox and Catholics, representatives of other Christian denominations - Pentecostalism, Baptists, Seventh-day Adventist Church, etc. - begin to flock to Dagestan. In the lower reaches of the Terek (in the villages of Alikazgan, Biryuchek, Chakannoe, Roslambeychik, Akaikino, etc.) lived the Old Believers.

At the end of the 19th - beginning of the 20th century, in the area between the Sulak and Terek rivers, on the territory of the Terek region Khasavyurt and Babayurt districts, several dozen German colonies and farms were formed. The Germans who arrived were mainly Mennonites and Evangelicals.

By the beginning of the 20th century, on the territory of Dagestan (without the Khasavyurt and Kizlyar districts) there were 22 parishes of the Russian Orthodox Church. Two Catholic churches in Temirxan-Şura and Port-Petrovsk, three Armenian churches, one in each city. There were churches in all cities (Temirkhan-Shure-1, Petrovsk-Porte-3 and Derbent-3), in fortresses (Akhty, Botlikh, Khunzakh, Gunib and Sergokala). All parishes belonged to the Vladikavkaz Diocese.

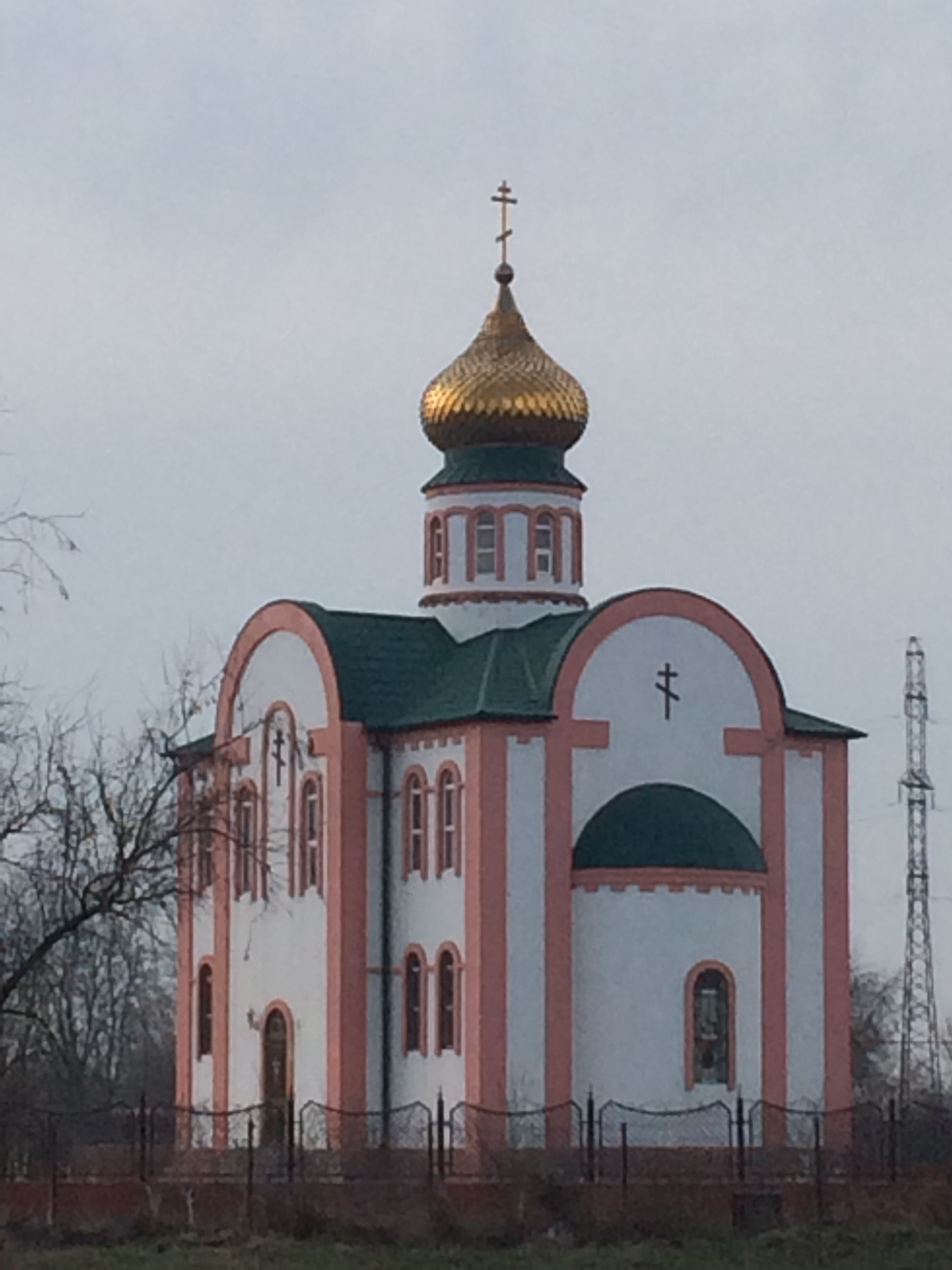
Holy Cross Exaltation Monastery, Kizlyar

=== Soviet Union ===
With the annexation of the Kizlyarsky, Tarumovsky, Nogaysky, Shelkovskoy and Neftekumsky districts and Khasavyurtovsky, Babayurtovsky and part of the Kizilyurtovsky District of the former Terek region to Dagestan, the number of Christians increases many times over.

As in other regions of the Soviet Union, in Dagestan all religious associations were outlawed. From the first years of the establishment of Soviet power, persecution of religion began - churches and monasteries were closed, clergy were arrested and shot. Almost all the nuns of the Holy Cross Monastery in Kizlyar were shot.

Churches and cathedrals were destroyed. Thus, the following monuments of church architecture were closed and subsequently blown up:

- The Cathedral of the Introduction to the Church of the Blessed Virgin Mary (Andreevsky Military Cathedral) which was located on the central square of Buynaksk, built in 1861.
- Alexander Nevsky Cathedral (Makhachkala, 1891)
- Cathedral of St. George the Victorious of Derbent, 1853
- Cathedral of St. George the Victorious (Kizlyar, 1904)
- Church of St. Nicholas the Wonderworker (Nizhny Chiryurt, 1879)
- Church of the Holy Blessed Grand Duke Alexander Nevsky (Sergokala, 1856)

By the mid-1930s, all churches and monasteries in Dagestan were closed.

The revival of church life began only during the Great Patriotic War, when Orthodox churches were reopened in Derbent, Makhachkala, Khasavyurt and Kizlyar. Already by the early 1970s in Dagestan there were five parishes of the Russian Orthodox Church, and ten by the early 1990s.

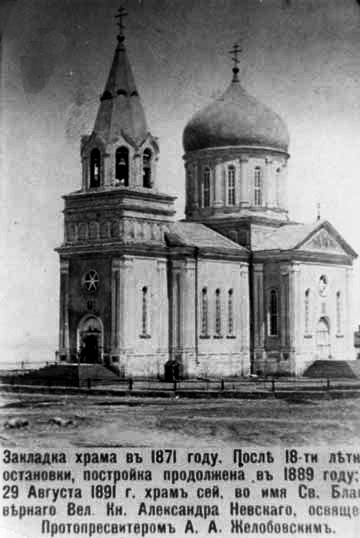
Alexander Nevsky Cathedral, Port-Petrovsk, circa 1900-1910

=== Russian Federation ===
From 1998 to 2011, all parishes of the Russian Orthodox Church located in the Republic of Dagestan belonged to the Diocese of Baku and Azerbaijan. Since March 22, 2011, they have become part of the newly formed Vladikavkaz Diocese and Diocese of Makhachkala of the Russian Orthodox Church. In February 2013, the Diocese of Makhachkala became independent. The territory is divided into two dioceses - Makhachkala and Kizlyar and includes 18 churches and chapel and 1 monastery.

Since 1990, 8 churches have been rebuilt in Kizlyar, Akhty, Buynaksk, Izberbash, Koktyubey, Talovka, Terekli-Mekteb and Komsomolsky. The destroyed Cathedral of St. George the Victorious in Kizlyar was restored. In 2000, the Cathedral of the Assumption of Makhachkala was granted the status of a cathedral. And in 2005, to the centenary of the cathedral, its restoration was carried out. Restoration works are being carried out in the Armenian church of St. Gregory in the village of Nyugdi, Derbent region.

Since 2007, the Women's Monastery of the Exaltation of the Holy Cross has been operating in Kizlyar, which is under the jurisdiction of the Diocese of Baku and Azerbaijan. The monastery was founded by nuns from the Yaroslavl region on the site of a chapel in the old Orthodox cemetery of the city.

The largest Orthodox church in the North Caucasus is in the territory of Dagestan - the Cathedral of Our Lady of the Sign in Khasavyurt. Also, recently the number of adherents of various Protestant associations and Pseudo-Christian religious movements have been growing.

=== Eastern Orthodox Churches and Parishes ===
==== Makhachkala Deanery ====
- Cathedral of the Assumption, Makhachkala
- Cathedral of Our Lady of the Sign, Khasavyurt.
- Church of Our Lady of Kazan, Kaspiysk
- Church of the Intercession of the Holy Virgin, Derbent
- Church of St. Seraphim of Sarov, Izberbash
- Alexander Nevsky Church, Akhty
- Alexander Nevsky Church, Buynaksk

==== Kizlyar deanery ====
- Cathedral of St. George the Victorious, Kizlyar
- St. Nicholas Church, Kizlyar
- Chapel of the Icon of the Mother of God “Seeking the Lost”, Kizlyar
- Temple of Our Lady of Kazan, Komsomolsky
- St. Nicholas Church, Kraynovka
- Church of St. Nicholas the Wonderworker, Bryansk
- Church of St. Nicholas the Wonderworker, Kochubey
- Church of St. Andrew the First-Called, Tarumovka
- Church of the Blessed Virgin Mary, Talovka
- Church of Peter and Paul, Koktyubey
- Chapel of Alexander Nevsky, village Terekli-Mekteb
- Holy Cross Exaltation Monastery, Kizlyar

==== Armenian Apostolic Churches ====
- Church of the Holy All-Savior, Derbent
- St Grigoris Church, Nyugdi

=== Protestant communities ===
Protestant communities have been present in Dagestan since the late 19th century. Their first representatives were German settlers and Russian religious dissenters made up of Baptists and Adventists that were first recorded in 1891 in the Temir-Khan-Shurinskiy okrug and numbered 208 people in 1897. In addition, 19,753 "sectarians," an umbrella term for non-Orthodox religions, were recorded in the Kizlyarsky otdel. Groups such as Mennonites and Lutherans were also present, mainly brought in by German settlers, as well as Russian folk Protestants.

Organized Protestant missionary activity in Dagestan began around 1911 with Grigoriy A. Grigoriev, an Adventist pastor. In 1912 the North Caucasian Conference was organized in Khavasyurt and was active until 1926. In 1925 there was 44 Adventist churches in the North Caucasus with 1,340 members. It wasn't until 1989, that a new Adventist congregation was organized in Makhachkala and a church was opened in Kaspiysk in 1991. The total number of Adventists in the whole North Caucasus Mission was 1,942 members with 38 churches in 2025.

Faced with persecution during the Soviet years, the Protestant community survived clandestinely. Since the fall of the Soviet Union, the Protestant community peaked between 1991 and 1995, largely coinciding with the socio-economic and political upheaval, with the largest growing groups being the Evangelical and Pentecostal communities which have garnered converts from Orthodoxy and Islam.

The Friends of the Tabasarans society was started in the Tabasaransky District by an American pastor, Philip Schenk in 1994 and had 500 members by 1996, though the Evangelical community only numbered 0.08% percent of all Tabasarans in 2022. Schenck and his family were removed from Russia in 2005 due to "increased tension and confessional confrontation in the south of Dagestan", though the Friends of the Tabasarans now exists as a Christian charity, founded in 2003.

Similar missionary activity occurred in the rural areas of Dagestan with Baptists active in Tashkapur and Terekli-Mekteb, while Adventists were active in the Kochubey. Jehovah Witnesses were reported preaching in Khunzakh.

Currently, Protestantism in the republic faces resistance from both the authorities and extremists. Converts face societal pressure, congregations have difficulty finding spaces to worship, they've been barred from engaging in outreach programs with drug addicts and convicts. On July 15, 2010, in Makhachkala, near a house of prayer, a Pentecostal pastor was shot in the head. In 2016, Russia passed the Yarovaya law which banned missionary activity.

In 2007 Dagestan had 41 Christian organizations, of which 26 are Protestant. The largest Protestant church in Dagestan is the Pentecostal Hosanna Church (also spelled Osanna) which has daughter congregations in Derbent (Vineyard congregation) and in Kaspiysk (Source of Life congregation). As of 2010, they have 3,000 members, 85% of which are Dagestani ethnic groups, the majority being Laks though congregations are multiethnic.
