= Karabakhli =

Karabakhli Карабаглы
- Selo
- Location within Republic of Dagestan Location within Russia
- Coordinates: 44°0′54″N 46°35′27″E
- Country: Russia
- Region: Republic of Dagestan
- District: Tarumovsky District

Population (2018)
  - Total: 738
- Time zone: UTC+3:00

Karabakhli (Russian: Карабаглы; Armenian: Ղարաբաղլի, Gharabaghli) is a village in the Tarumovsky District of Dagestan, Russia.

== Geography ==
It is located 8 kilometres from Tarumovka, the administrative centre of Tarumovsky District.

== History ==
The village was founded in 1797 by Armenian refugees from Derbent. The name of the village was given in honour of their homeland.

Currently, Karabakhli is the only settlement in Dagestan where Armenians constitute a significant proportion of the population.

== Population ==
Population
1926	2002	2010	2012	2013	2014	2015	2016	2017	2018
633	743	702	695	703	723	741	720	725	738

=== Demographics ===
According to the 1926 Soviet census:

Ethnicity	Number of people	Percentage
Armenians	629	99.4 %
Russians	4	0.6 %

According to the 2010 Russian census:

Ethnicity	Population count	Percentage of population
Armenians	304	43.3%
Dargins	275	39.2%
Russians	59	8.4%
Laks	30	4.3%
Other	34	4.8%
Total	702	100 %

Of the 702 people in the 2010 census, 329 were men and 373 were women.
