= Selo imeni M. Gorkogo =

Selo imeni M. Gorkogo Село имени М. Горького
- Selo
- Location within Republic of Dagestan Location within Russia
- Coordinates: 44°01′N 46°38′E
- Country: Russia
- Region: Republic of Dagestan
- District: Tarumovsky District
- Time zone: UTC+3:00

Selo imeni M. Gorkogo (Russian: Село имени М. Горького) is a rural locality (a selo) in Ullubiyevsky Selsoviet, Tarumovsky District, Republic of Dagestan, Russia. Population: 284 (2010 census); 195 (2002 census); 119 (1989 Soviet census). There are 5 streets.

== Geography ==
Selo is located 13 km southeast of Tarumovka (the district's administrative centre) by road. Karabagly is the nearest rural locality.
