= Imunny =

Imunny Имунный
- Selo
- Location within Republic of Dagestan Location within Russia
- Coordinates: 44°01′N 46°18′E
- Country: Russia
- Region: Republic of Dagestan
- District: Tarumovsky District
- Time zone: UTC+3:00

Imunny (Russian: Имунный) is a rural locality (a selo) in Novogeorgiyevsky Selsoviet, Tarumovsky District, Republic of Dagestan, Russia. Population: 361 (2010 census); 317 (2002 census); 341 (1989 Soviet census). There are 6 streets.

== Geography ==
Imunny is located 28 km west of Tarumovka (the district's administrative centre) by road. Arslanbek is the nearest rural locality.
