= Kalinovka, Republic of Dagestan =

Kalinovka Калиновка
- Selo
- Location within Republic of Dagestan Location within Russia
- Coordinates: 43°58′N 46°34′E
- Country: Russia
- Region: Republic of Dagestan
- District: Tarumovsky District
- Time zone: UTC+3:00

Kalinovka (Russian: Kalinovka) is a rural locality (a selo) and the administrative center of Kalinovsky Selsoviet, Tarumovsky District, Republic of Dagestan, Russia. Population: 1,805 (2010 census); 1,774 (2002 census); 1,672 (1989 Soviet census). There are 16 streets.

== Geography ==
Kalinovka is located 16 km south of Tarumovka (the district's administrative centre) by road. Karabagly is the nearest rural locality.
