= Yurkovka, Republic of Dagestan =

Yurkovka Юрковка
- Selo
- Location within Republic of Dagestan Location within Russia
- Coordinates: 44°10′N 46°40′E
- Country: Russia
- Region: Republic of Dagestan
- District: Tarumovsky District
- Time zone: UTC+3:00

Yurkovka (Russian: Юрковка) is a rural locality (a selo) and the administrative center of Yurkovsky Selsoviet, Tarumovsky District, Republic of Dagestan, Russia. Population: 1,527 (2010 census); 1,465 (2002 census); 1,169 (1989 Soviet census). There are 13 streets.

== Geography ==
Yurkovka is located 21 km northeast of Tarumovka (the district's administrative centre) by road. Zelyony Bugor is the nearest rural locality.
