= Plodopitomnik, Republic of Dagestan =

Plodopitomnik Плодопитомник
- Selo
- Location within Republic of Dagestan Location within Russia
- Coordinates: 43°59′N 46°43′E
- Country: Russia
- Region: Republic of Dagestan
- District: Tarumovsky District
- Time zone: UTC+3:00

Plodopitomnik (Russian: Плодопитомник) is a rural locality (a selo) in Ullubiyevsky Selsoviet, Tarumovsky District, Republic of Dagestan, Russia. Population: 164 (2010 census); 128 (2002 census); 227 (1989 Soviet census). There are 3 streets.

== Geography ==
Plodopitomnik is located 24 km southeast of Tarumovka (the district's administrative centre) by road. Aybatkhanovskoye lesnichestvo is the nearest rural locality.
