= Novogeorgiyevka, Tarumovsky District, Republic of Dagestan =

Novogeorgiyevka Новогеоргиевка
- Selo
- Location within Republic of Dagestan Location within Russia
- Coordinates: 43°55′N 46°38′E
- Country: Russia
- Region: Republic of Dagestan
- District: Tarumovsky District
- Time zone: UTC+3:00

Novogeorgiyevka (Russian: Новогеоргиевка) is a rural locality (a selo) and the administrative center of Novogeorgiyevsky Selsoviet, Tarumovsky District, Republic of Dagestan, Russia. Population: 2,379 (2010 census); 2,079 (2002 census); 1,766 (1989 Soviet census). There are 19 streets.

== Geography ==
Novogeorgiyevka is located 20 km south of Tarumovka (the district's administrative centre) by road. Bondarenovskoye is the nearest rural locality.
