= Novodmitriyevka, Republic of Dagestan =

Novodmitriyevka Новодмитриевка Шобытлы
- Selo
- Location within Republic of Dagestan Location within Russia
- Coordinates: 44°05′N 46°29′E
- Country: Russia
- Region: Republic of Dagestan
- District: Tarumovsky District
- Time zone: UTC+3:00

Novodmitriyevka (Russian: Новодмитриевка; Nogai: Шобытлы, Şobıtlı) is a rural locality (a selo) in Tarumovsky District, Republic of Dagestan, Russia. Population: 2,096 (2021 census); 1,938 (2002 census); 1,602 (1989 Soviet census). There are 18 streets.

== Geography ==
Novodmitriyevka is located 7 km west of Tarumovka (the district's administrative centre) by road. Tarumovka is the nearest rural locality.
