= Razdolye, Republic of Dagestan =

Razdolye Раздолье
- Selo
- Location within Republic of Dagestan Location within Russia
- Coordinates: 44°11′N 46°35′E
- Country: Russia
- Region: Republic of Dagestan
- District: Tarumovsky District
- Time zone: UTC+3:00

Razdolye (Russian: Раздолье) is a rural locality (a selo) in Tarumovsky District, Republic of Dagestan, Russia. Population: 1,375 (2021 census); 1,032 (2002 census); 1,602 (1989 Soviet census). There are 9 streets.

== Geography ==
Razdolye is located 15 km north of Tarumovka (the district's administrative centre) by road. Talovka is the nearest rural locality.
