= Talovka, Republic of Dagestan =

Talovka Таловка
- Selo
- Location within Republic of Dagestan Location within Russia
- Coordinates: 44°14′N 46°35′E
- Country: Russia
- Region: Republic of Dagestan
- District: Tarumovsky District
- Time zone: UTC+3:00

Talovka (Russian: Таловка) is a rural locality (a selo) and the administrative center of Talovsky Selsoviet, Tarumovsky District, Republic of Dagestan, Russia. Population: 1,510 (2010 census); 1,417 (2002 census); 1,377 (1989 Soviet census). There are 7 streets.

== Geography ==
Talovka is located 21 km north of Tarumovka (the district's administrative centre) by road. Razdolye is the nearest rural locality.
