= Koktyubey =

Koktyubey Коктюбей
- Selo
- Location within Republic of Dagestan Location within Russia
- Coordinates: 44°16′N 46°44′E
- Country: Russia
- Region: Republic of Dagestan
- District: Tarumovsky District
- Time zone: UTC+3:00

Koktyubey (Russian: Коктюбей) is a rural locality (a selo) in Tarumovsky District, Republic of Dagestan, Russia. Population: 542 (2021 census); 732 (2002 census); 666 (1989 Soviet census). There are 19 streets.

== Geography ==
Koktyubey is located 34 km northeast of Tarumovka (the district's administrative centre) by road. Talovka is the nearest rural locality.
