= Tarumovka =

Tarumovka is the name of several rural localities in Russia:

- Tarumovka, Republic of Dagestan, a selo in the Republic of Dagestan
- Tarumovka, Saratov Oblast, a village in Saratov Oblast
