= Kochubey, Republic of Dagestan =

Kochubey Кочубей
- Selo
- Location within Republic of Dagestan Location within Russia
- Coordinates: 44°23′N 46°32′E
- Country: Russia
- Region: Republic of Dagestan
- District: Tarumovsky District
- Time zone: UTC+3:00

Kochubey (Russian: Кочубей) is a rural locality (a selo) in Tarumovsky District, Republic of Dagestan, Russia. Population: 8,265 (2021 census); 6,366 (2002 census); 11,205 (1989 Soviet census). There are 35 streets.

== Geography ==
Kochubey is located 38 km north of Tarumovka (the district's administrative centre) by road. Talovka is the nearest rural locality.

== Climate ==
Kochubey has a cold semi-arid climate (Köppen climate classification BSk), with moderate-cold winters and some of the hottest summers in Russia. Precipitation is quite low during all year with some maximum in summer.

Climate data for Kochubey (1991–2020 normals, extremes 1951–present)
Month	Jan	Feb	Mar	Apr	May	Jun	Jul	Aug	Sep	Oct	Nov	Dec	Year
Record high °C (°F)	17.2 (63.0)	21.1 (70.0)	29.2 (84.6)	34.8 (94.6)	35.7 (96.3)	38.5 (101.3)	41.6 (106.9)	41.4 (106.5)	37.9 (100.2)	31.0 (87.8)	24.7 (76.5)	17.0 (62.6)	41.6 (106.9)
Mean daily maximum °C (°F)	2.6 (36.7)	3.6 (38.5)	9.7 (49.5)	17.3 (63.1)	24.6 (76.3)	30.1 (86.2)	32.7 (90.9)	31.7 (89.1)	25.6 (78.1)	18.2 (64.8)	9.8 (49.6)	4.6 (40.3)	17.5 (63.6)
Daily mean °C (°F)	−0.6 (30.9)	−0.1 (31.8)	4.8 (40.6)	11.4 (52.5)	18.3 (64.9)	23.7 (74.7)	26.2 (79.2)	25.2 (77.4)	19.7 (67.5)	13.1 (55.6)	6.1 (43.0)	1.4 (34.5)	12.4 (54.4)
Mean daily minimum °C (°F)	−3.2 (26.2)	−3.0 (26.6)	1.1 (34.0)	6.3 (43.3)	12.6 (54.7)	17.7 (63.9)	20.1 (68.2)	19.2 (66.6)	14.5 (58.1)	8.9 (48.0)	2.9 (37.2)	−1.2 (29.8)	8.0 (46.4)
Record low °C (°F)	−26.1 (−15.0)	−28.9 (−20.0)	−19.5 (−3.1)	−8.2 (17.2)	0.7 (33.3)	6.7 (44.1)	12.0 (53.6)	7.6 (45.7)	−5.0 (23.0)	−17.8 (0.0)	−19.5 (−3.1)	−24.5 (−12.1)	−28.9 (−20.0)
Average precipitation mm (inches)	16 (0.6)	17 (0.7)	17 (0.7)	23 (0.9)	31 (1.2)	34 (1.3)	28 (1.1)	20 (0.8)	20 (0.8)	21 (0.8)	18 (0.7)	20 (0.8)	265 (10.4)
Source: Погода и Климат
