= St Grigoris Church, Nyugdi =

Church of St Grigoris
- Նյուգդիի Սուրբ Գրիգորիս եկեղեցի (Armenian)
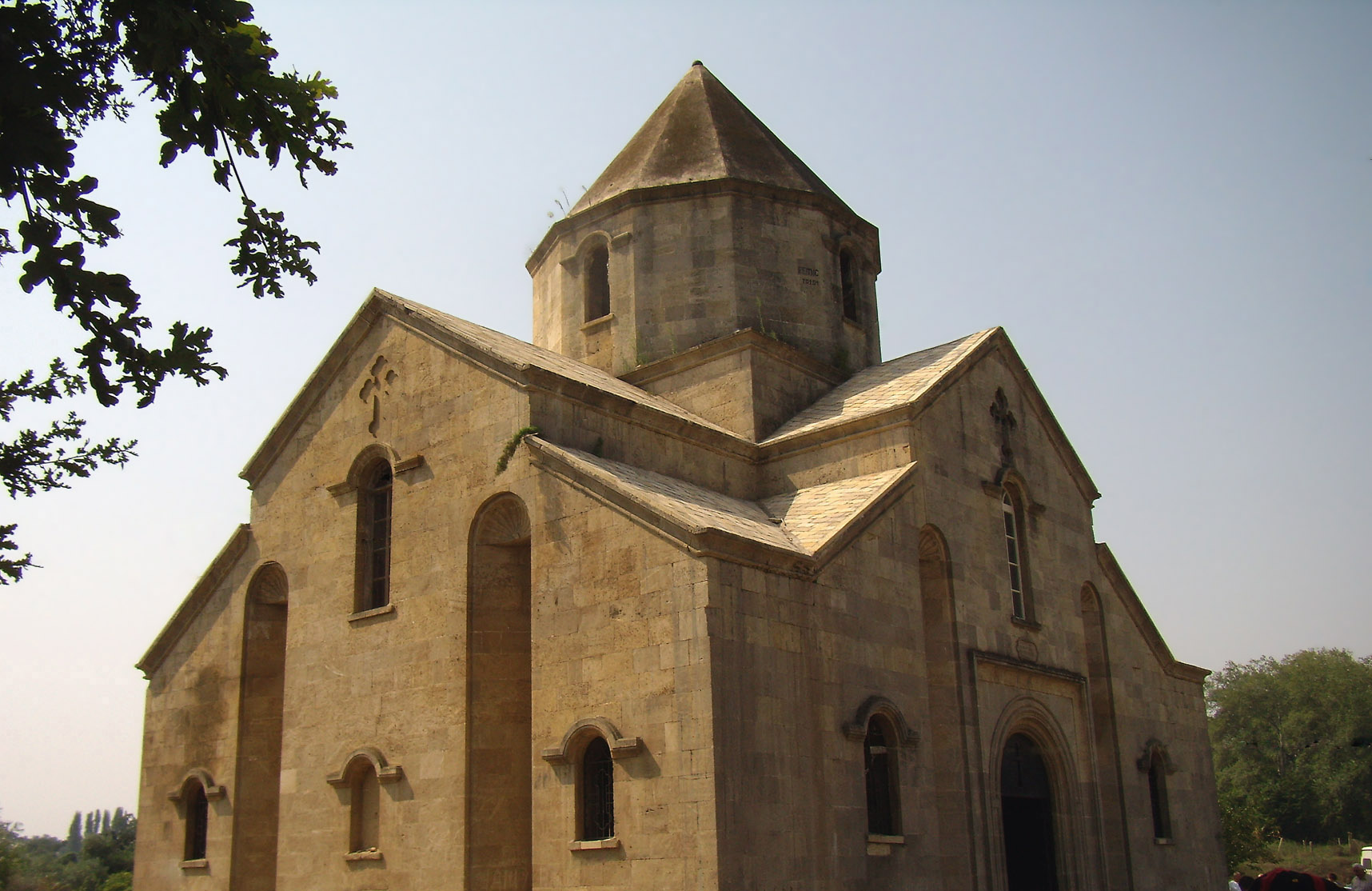
- Church of St Grigoris
- 41°52′17″N 48°26′20″E
- Location: Nyugdi
- Country: Russia
- Denomination: Armenian Apostolic Church

History
- Dedication: Gregory the Illuminator
- Consecrated: 1916

Architecture
- Style: Armenian architecture
- Groundbreaking: 1916
- Completed: 1916

Specifications
- Length: 17 metres (56 ft)
- Width: 12 metres (39 ft)
- Height: 18 metres (59 ft)

Administration
- Diocese: Southern Russia

The Church of St Grigoris (Russian: Церковь Святого Григориса; Armenian: Նյուգդիի Սուրբ Գրիգորիս եկեղեցի) is an Armenian church built in memory of the events of the 4th century in the village of Nyugdi in the Derbentsky District of Dagestan, 37 km from Derbent.

== History ==
The translation of the Armenian inscription above one of the entrances to the Chapel of St. Grigoris reads:

The temple was built on the site of the martyrdom of St. Grigoris, the grandson of our father Gregory the Illuminator, with funds from the Vanetsyants brothers, Grigor and Lazar Petrosovich, in the year of the Lord 1916.

The current building of the Church of St. Grigoris in Nyugdi replaced the chapel that stood on this site until the beginning of the 20th century. In the Chapel of St. Grigoris in the village of Nyugdi, there was a stone with an inscription in Armenian, which was found in our time, the inscription on the stone has been translated, and it is in the chapel. The inscription reads:

I, Mrs. Elizaveta Kochkachyants, restored the church in memory of myself and my family. Lord, remember us when words end and deeds reign. 1879.

The earliest known written mention of the chapel of St. Grigoris in Nyugdi dates to 1850, when it was visited by Archbishop Sargis Jalalyants (1819-1879), who wrote about it in the second part of his “Journey through Great Armenia”:

a small chapel was built, inside which there is a square grave…

In 1857, the chapel was visited by the once famous publicist, researcher of the history and life of the peoples of Dagestan Rostom-bek Erzinkyan. Erzinkyan wrote:

…a chapel built of brick in Aghvank, on the bank of the Gurgan stream, on the edge of a hilly plain. The length of the chapel is 18 feet, the width is 10, and the height is 20. In the south wall of this small chapel are two open windows, the structure is vaulted, in the interior are small brick arches, and in the upper part of the east wall are old pictures of the Crucifixion, the Passion of Christ and the Virgin Mary without inscriptions. In the center of the holy chapel is a small dome, the height of which is 5 and a half spans, the width is 3, and the length is 4. It has 3 very small windows and a door on the east side, so incense is burned in honor of the holy relics, blessed relics and the happy martyr, the dome has a pointed tent, which is crowned with an iron cross.

The chapel, and in 1916 the church, were built in memory of the grandson of St. Gregory the Illuminator and the son of St. Vrtanes I, Grigoris, who was canonized. St. Grigoris spread Christianity in Georgia and Albania in the early 4th century, which eventually led to his martyrdom.

According to early medieval historians, by order of the king of the pagan Maskut tribe Sanesan from the Caspian region, Grigoris was tied to a horse and dragged along the coastal rocks until he died. His disciples transported the body of the saint to the Amaras Monastery and buried him there. Since the burial place was not marked to avoid desecration by the pagans, it was forgotten over time. The relics of St. Grigoris were found later in 489 by king Vachagan III.

During the Soviet period, the church was recognized as a historical monument, but the inside of the church was desolate for many decades. The walls of the Church of St. Grigoris in Nyugdi have been preserved, but the interior decoration has not. But, despite this, the villagers did not destroy the ancient temple, but on the contrary, revered the religious and architectural monument located in their area. The length of the church is 17 m, the width is 12 m, the height of the dome is about 18 m. On each wall there are recesses in the form of straight triangular prisms, which end at the top with five diverging lines. On four sides of the walls under the roof there are through holes in the shape of a cross. Restoration work is underway, which for many years was headed by the chairman of the Armenian community of Derbent and the Dagestan regional branch of the Union of Armenians of Russia Viktor Danilyan (1951-2019) with the support of a group of enthusiasts. The tradition of pilgrimage to the church has been revived, with Armenian families from Dagestan, southern Russia and elsewhere coming to worship Saint Gregory on the penultimate Sunday of August. By August 2011, the church had undergone a significant transformation. The interior walls were finished, a stone floor and altar platform were installed, and a dome cross was made.

On August 20, 2011, the Head of the Diocese of the South of Russia of the Armenian Apostolic Church, Bishop Movses Movsesyan, performed the rite of anointing the restored dome cross and icons. In 2014, the dome cross was installed in its place.

On August 21, 2016, the 100th anniversary of the Church of St. Grigoris was solemnly celebrated in Nyugdi. A prayer service, a baptismal ceremony for new parishioners, and a festive meal were held. Dagestani Armenians, guests from Yerevan, Pyatigorsk, Kislovodsk, representatives of the Orthodox, Muslim, and Jewish communities of Dagestan, and the republican authorities attended the celebration.

== See also ==
- Christianity in Dagestan
- Church of the Holy All-Savior of Derbent
- Grigoris (catholicos)
- List of Armenian churches in Russia
- Amaras Monastery - burial place of Grigoris
