= Sos, Nagorno-Karabakh =

Sos Սոս
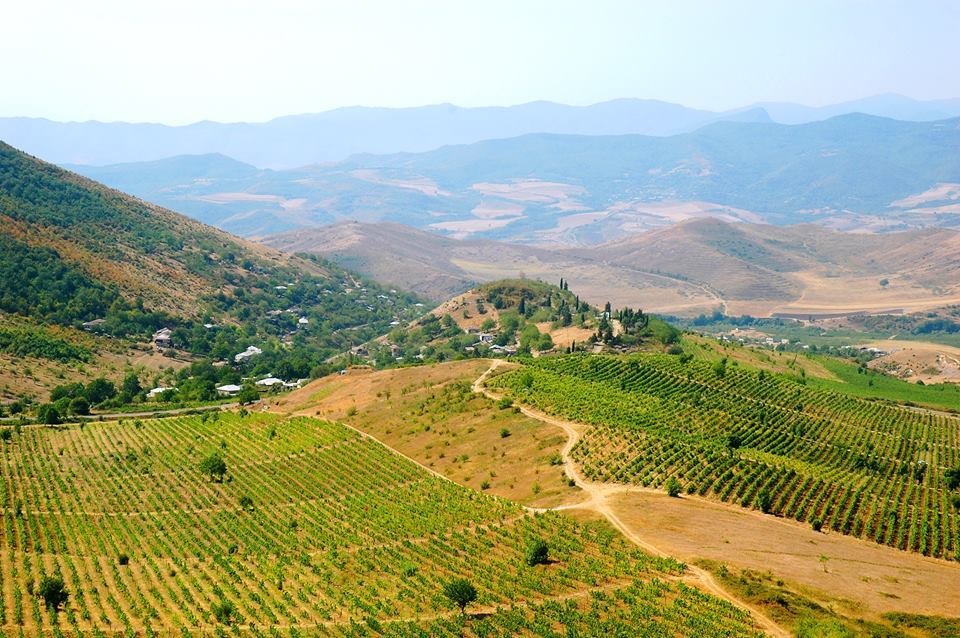

- Location within Azerbaijan
- Coordinates: 39°42′46″N 47°00′33″E
- Country: Azerbaijan
  - District: Khojavend

Population (2015)
  - Total: 1,089
- Time zone: UTC+4 (AZT)

Sos (Armenian: Սոս) is a village in the Khojavend District of Azerbaijan, in the region of Nagorno-Karabakh. Until 2023 it was controlled by the breakaway Republic of Artsakh. The village had an ethnic Armenian-majority population until the expulsion of the Armenian population of Nagorno-Karabakh by Azerbaijan following the 2023 Azerbaijani offensive in Nagorno-Karabakh.

== History ==
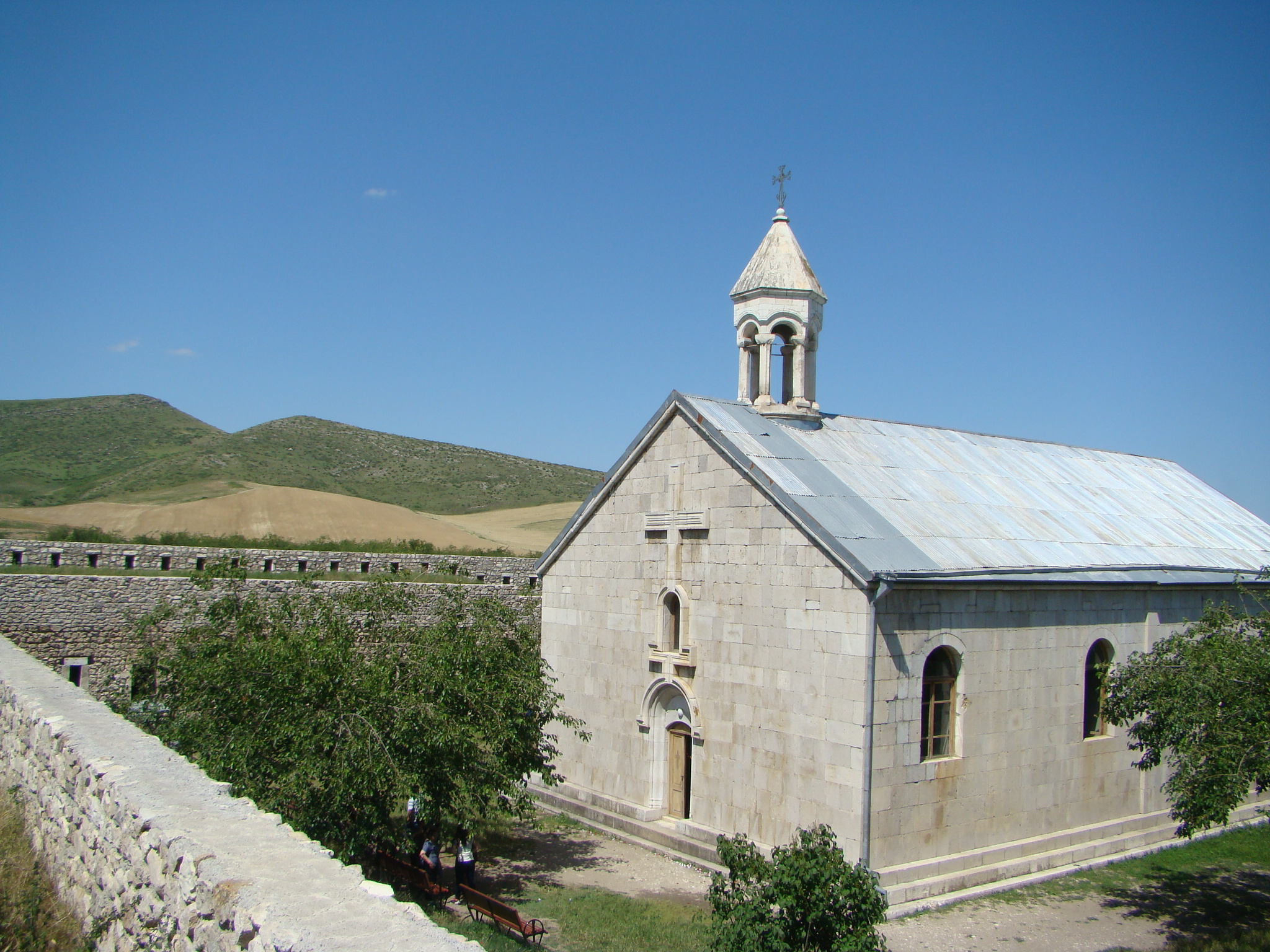
Amaras Monastery near Sos

During the Soviet period, the village was a part of the Martuni District of the Nagorno-Karabakh Autonomous Oblast.

== Historical heritage sites ==
Historical heritage sites in and around the village include Amaras Monastery (established in the 4th century, rebuilt in 1858), the 5th/6th-century St. Lusavorich monastic complex and pilgrimage site, the 19th-century St. George's Church (Armenian: Սուրբ Գևորգ եկեղեցի, romanized: Surb Gevorg Yekeghetsi), and the Tevosants spring monument (1902).

== Economy and culture ==
The population is mainly engaged in agriculture and animal husbandry. As of 2015, the village has a municipal building, a house of culture, a secondary school, a kindergarten, three shops, and a medical centre.

== Demographics ==
The village had 1,016 inhabitants in 2005, and 1,089 inhabitants in 2015.

As of December 2025, 60 Azerbaijani families, totaling 252 individuals, have been resettled in the village by Azerbaijan.

== Gallery ==
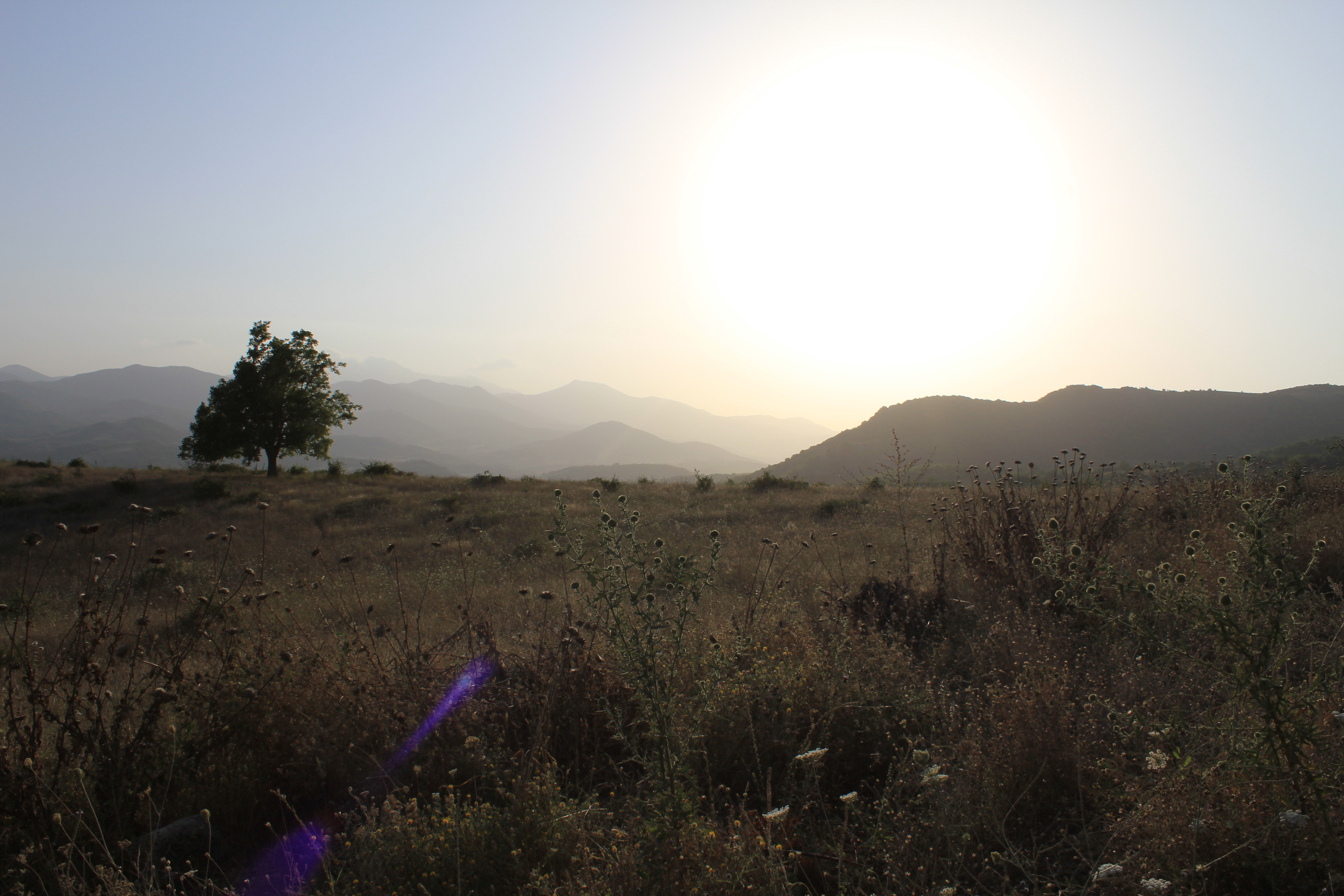

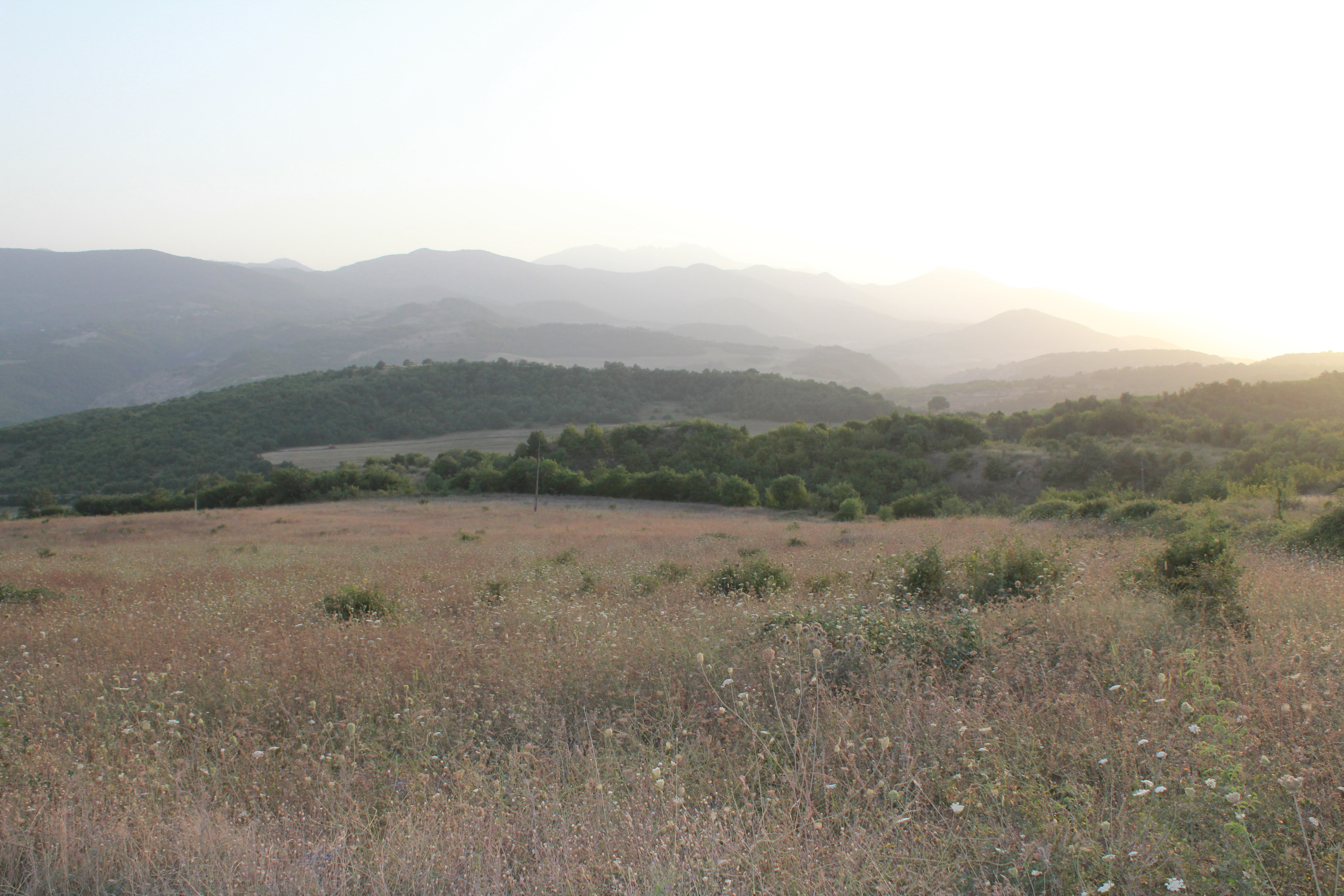

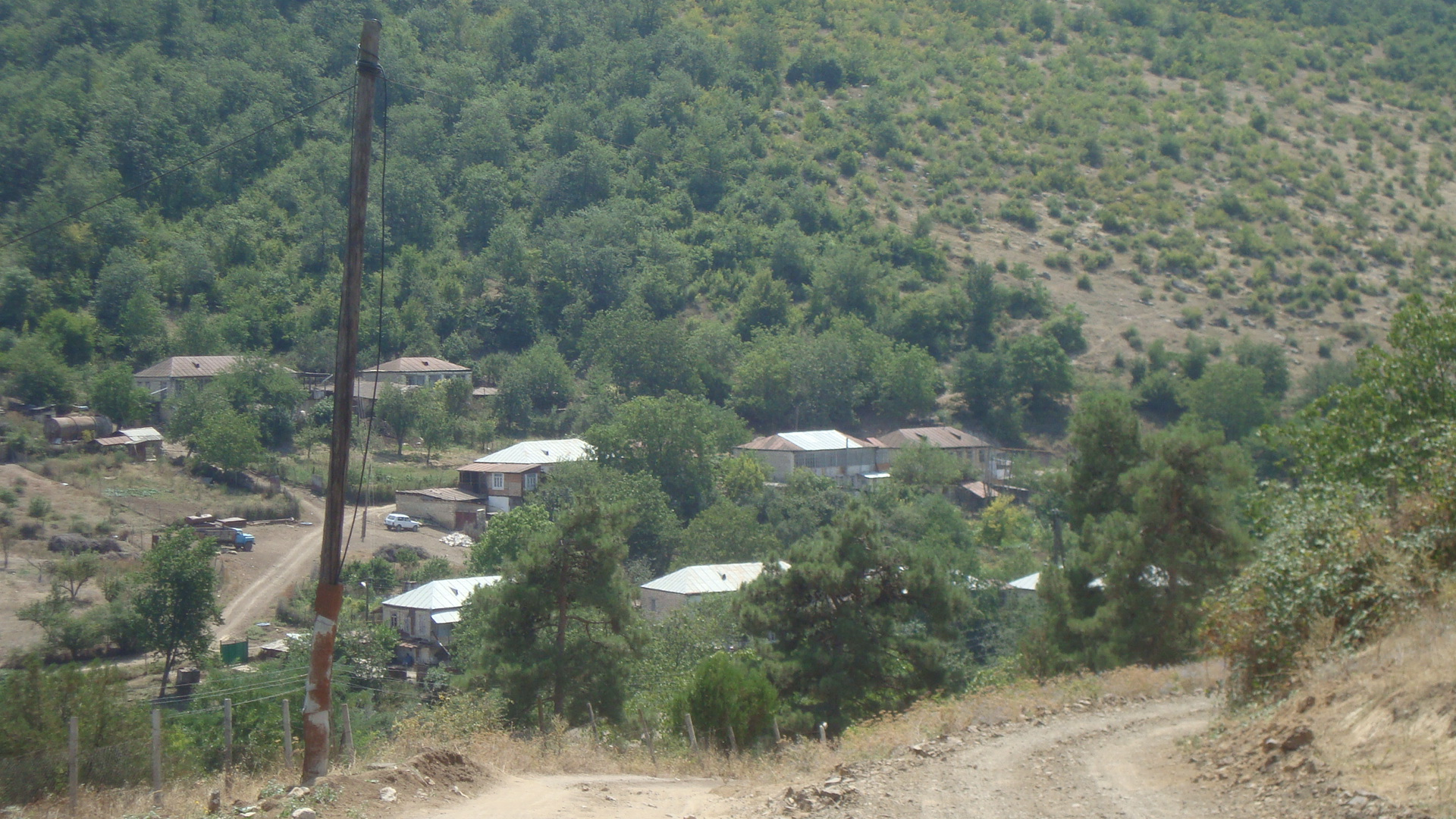

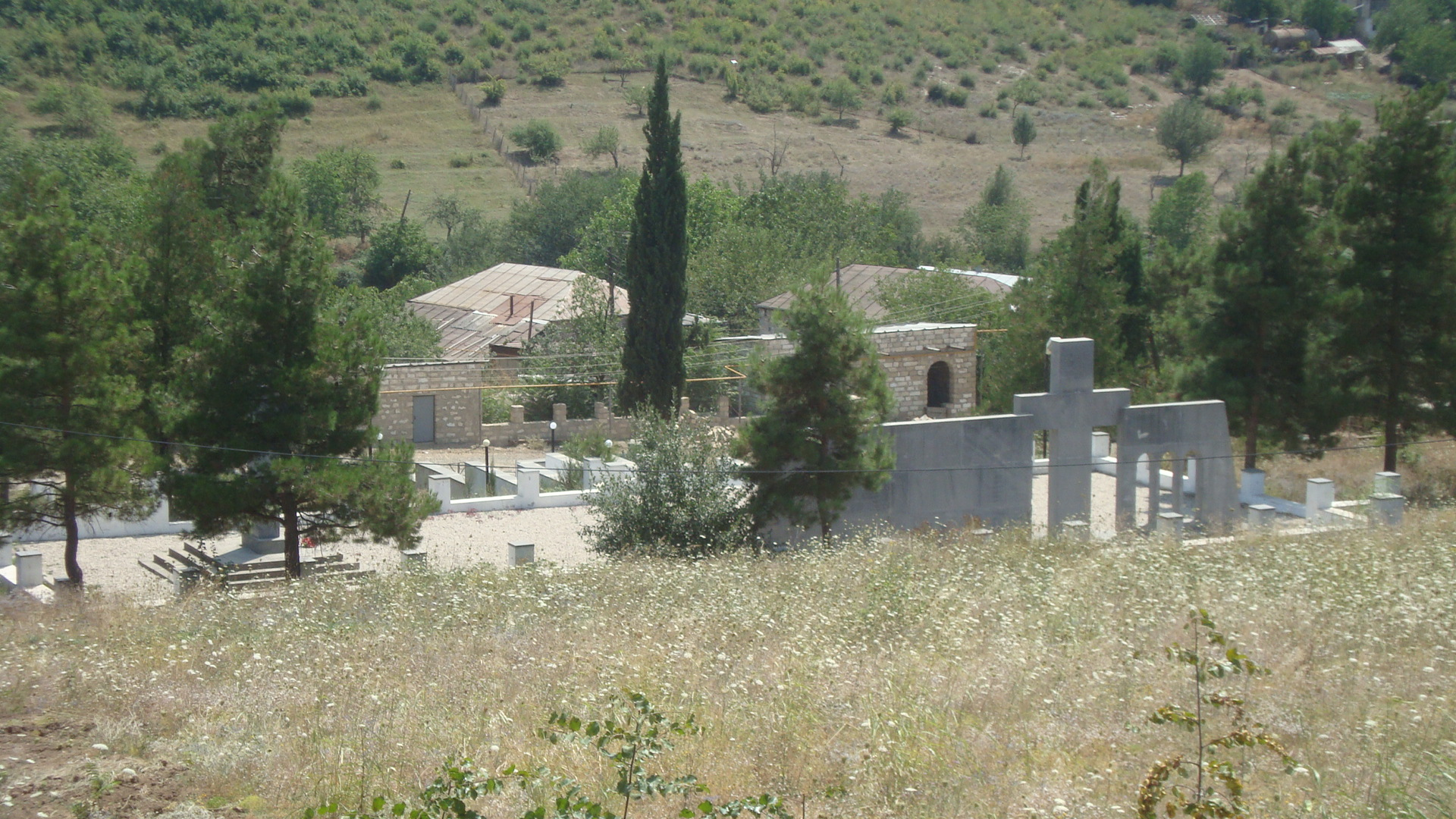

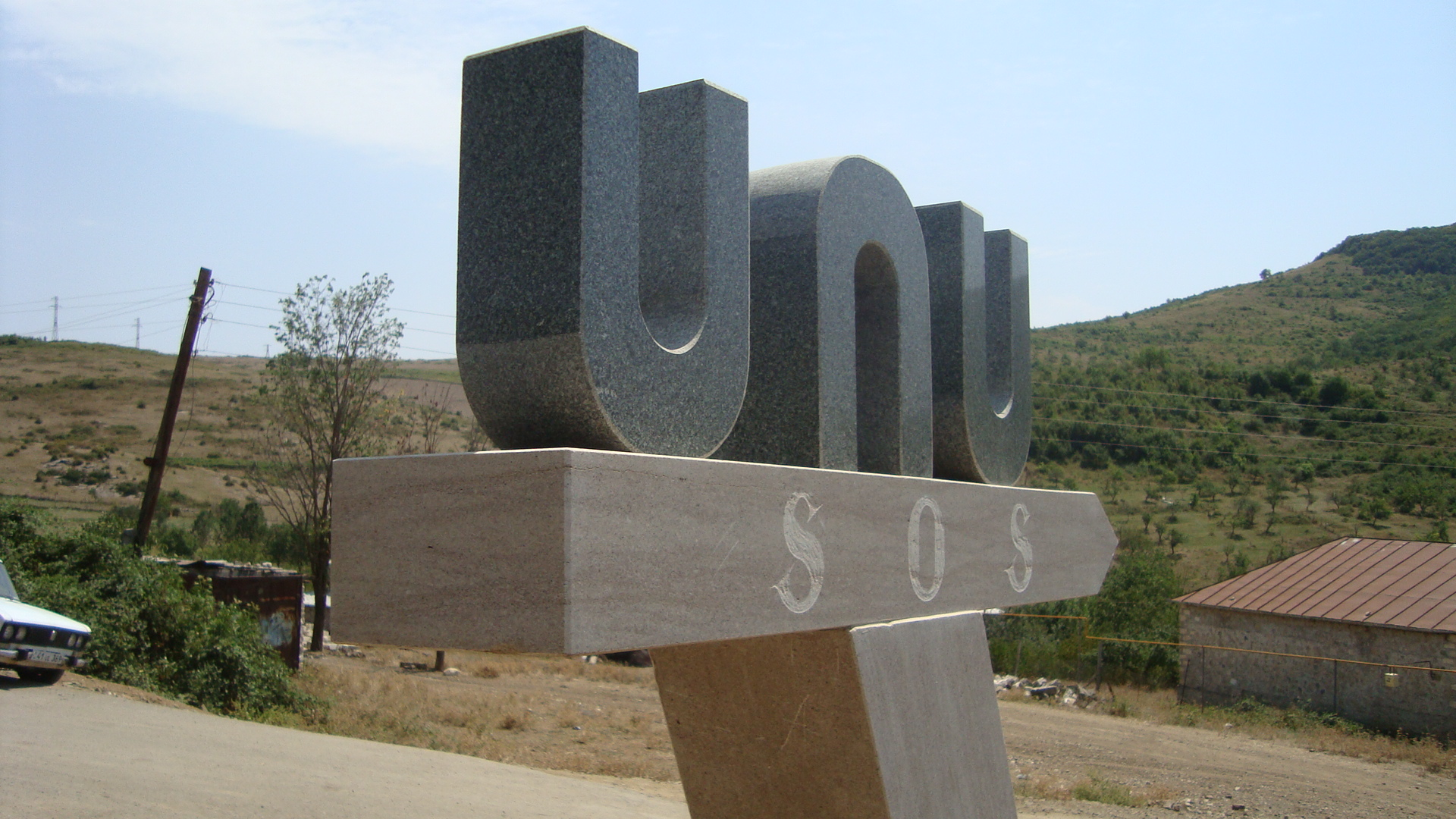
