= Cathedral of St. George the Victorious of Derbent =

Church in Derbent, Dagestan, Russia

Cathedral of St. George the Victorious
- Собор Святого Георгия Победоносца (Russian)
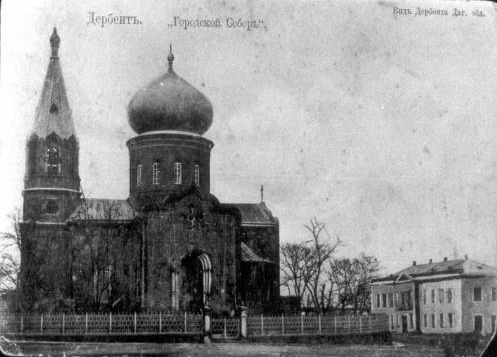
- Cathedral of St. George the Victorious
- 40°03′28″N 48°17′18″E
- Location: Derbent, Dagestan
- Country: Russia
- Denomination: Eastern Orthodoxy

History
- Consecrated: November 26, 1853

Architecture
- Functional status: Demolished
- Architect: Grigory Gagarin
- Architectural type: Cathedral
- Style: Russian-Byzantine
- Years built: 1949-1853
- Groundbreaking: May 8, 1849
- Completed: 1853
- Construction cost: 44,507 Rbls. 84 kop.
- Demolished: 1938

Specifications
- Capacity: 500

Administration
- Diocese: Vladikavkaz

The Cathedral of St. George the Victorious (Russian: Собор Святого Георгия Победоносца) was the main Russian Orthodox Church in the city of Derbent, located on the site of the monument to Vladimir Lenin on Freedom Square (former Tserkovnaya Street, Yermolova). Demolished in 1938.

== History ==
=== Prerequisites for construction ===
Until the end of the 40s of the 19th century, the only Russian Orthodox Church in the city of Derbent was the small church of St. George at the line battalion. The church was located in an old and cramped building of a former mosque that was built in the 11th century. It was used as a church from 1823 to 1853. It was returned to parishioners in 1994. Now known as Tovba Mosque or Kilis Mosque. Translated from Turkic means Church-mosque. Served only the military population of the city. In 1823, General Aleksey P. Yermolov ordered that this mosque be converted into a church "in the name of St. George the Victorious". A cross was erected over the dome of the building, and the entrance gate moved to the western side. For thirty years the former mosque served as a garrison church. With the growth of the civil Orthodox population and on December 14, 1846 the city was given the status of the center of the Derbent Governorate, the question arose of building a new, more spacious church. The initiator of the construction and the fundraiser was the Governor, Lieutenant general, Prince Alexander Gagarin.

=== Fundraising for construction ===
In 1848, a subscription was opened throughout Russia to raise funds for the construction of the temple. Initially, there were only 3,000 roubles of church money collected by the military. Donations from the population of the city, to which the Muslim population of the province made a feasible contribution, amounted to another 10,000 Rbls. The governor of the Caucasus, Prince Mikhail S. Vorontsov, sent 1,000 Rbls, the headquarters of a separate Caucasian corps – 500 Rbls; the merchant's wife of the first guild A. A. Baranova, together with a fellow trader Zubov, donated 1,000 Rbls; Kuban resident S. A. Lazarev – 500 Rbls, Derbent citizen Ya. A. Avetov – 500 Rbls; Moscow merchant N. G. Nikonov – 250 Rbls and two silver-plated chandeliers. Thus, another 11,000 Rbls were collected. But during the construction it turned out that the funds were not enough. To continue the construction, the governor of the Caucasus allowed the use of the income of Cuban dues articles for 1850 and 1851 in the amount of 9,479 Rbls. 48 kop. and to borrow 2,000 Rbls from the city income. By the end of 1852, it became clear that there were no funds for the decoration and purchase of decorations and bells of the temple. The new military governor, Prince Moses Zakharovich Argutinsky-Dolgoruky, came out with a presentation to raise funds for completion. As a result, another 29,446 Rbls were collected. In total, 44,507 Rbls. 84 kop. were spent on the construction of the cathedral.

=== Construction ===
On May 8, 1849, at noon, in the presence of Prince Mikhail S. Vorontsov and his wife, the foundation was laid. The project of the church was developed by Prince Grigory Gagarin in the Russian-Byzantine style. The construction was supervised by field engineer captain V. I. Gerschelman. The church was built from local hewn stone and was designed for 500 people. While digging the foundation, the builders stumbled upon the ruins of an ancient temple. Presumably, in the 4th century, an Albanian Orthodox Church was located on that place. Many clay pipes and the remains of a pool were found, as well as almost surviving vaults of the temple made of burnt bricks with the remains of columns and floors paved with slabs.

According to the project, the church was supposed to have a cast-iron floor, which was later replaced with a walnut end floor. Church utensils were delivered from all over the empire: crosses, chandeliers, candlesticks from Moscow, bells from Astrakhan, and an iconostasis from Tbilisi. The painting of the temple and the writing of some of the icons were made by Prince G. G. Gagarin. In particular, he painted icons: the Last Supper, the holy archangels Michael and Gabriel, the Descent of the Holy Spirit on the apostles, St. George and St. Alexander Nevsky. A clock made by Master Stern in Odessa was installed on the bell tower. In 1875, a fence was erected around the church and a square was laid out.

=== Activity ===
On November 26, 1853, the temple was consecrated in the name of St. George the Victorious. Service in the church began on December 15, 1853. Initially, the church remained in the military department, as it was built for the military department instead of the old one. In 1853 the old church was returned to the Muslims. Services in the church were conducted alternately by the archpriest of the line regiment and the diocesan priest. In 1859 a deacon and a clerk were appointed to the staff of the church. In 1862, a new diocesan priest was appointed Exarch of Georgia. In 1879, the church was transferred to the eparchial subordination of the Baku Deanery of the Georgian Exarchate. In 1894, the Vladikavkaz diocese was formed, which included the Dagestan region. In 1902 the church was given the status of a cathedral. The parables of the cathedral consisted of: an archpriest, a priest, a deacon and two psalmists. The content of the parable was made from the funds of the state treasury.

On November 14, 2020, in Derbent, in one of the premises of the Museum of Carpet and Decorative and Applied Art, a wooden slab was discovered, presumably being a fragment of an icon case for the icon of St. Alexander Nevsky from the Cathedral of St. George the Victorious, demolished in 1938. The following inscription was preserved on a wooden plate:

This image was built in memory of the miraculous preservation of the precious life of the sovereign emperor on April 4, 1866, by the diligence of the Derbent society.

An inscription similar to the text on the icon case was found in the book of Evgeny Kozubsky (1851–1911) "History of the city of Derbent" (1906).

=== Destruction of the temple ===
As part of the Gosateizm program the cathedral was destroyed in 1938. Currently in its place is a monument to Vladimir Lenin.
