= Kraynovka =

Kraynovka Крайновка
- Selo
- Location within Republic of Dagestan Location within Russia
- Coordinates: 43°58′N 47°22′E
- Country: Russia
- Region: Republic of Dagestan
- District: Kizlyarsky District
- Time zone: UTC+3:00

Kraynovka (Russian: Крайновка) is a rural locality (a selo) and the administrative centre of Kraynovsky Selsoviet, Kizlyarsky District, Republic of Dagestan, Russia. The population was 1,213 as of 2010. There are 6 streets.

== Geography ==
Kraynovka is located 63 km northeast of Kizlyar (the district's administrative centre) by road. Kollektivizator and Imeni Magomeda Gadzhiyeva are the nearest rural localities.

== Nationalities ==
Russians, Avars, Dargins and Nogais live there.
