= Nyugdi, Russia =

Nyugdi Нюгди Нуьгдигь-Муьшгуьр
- Village
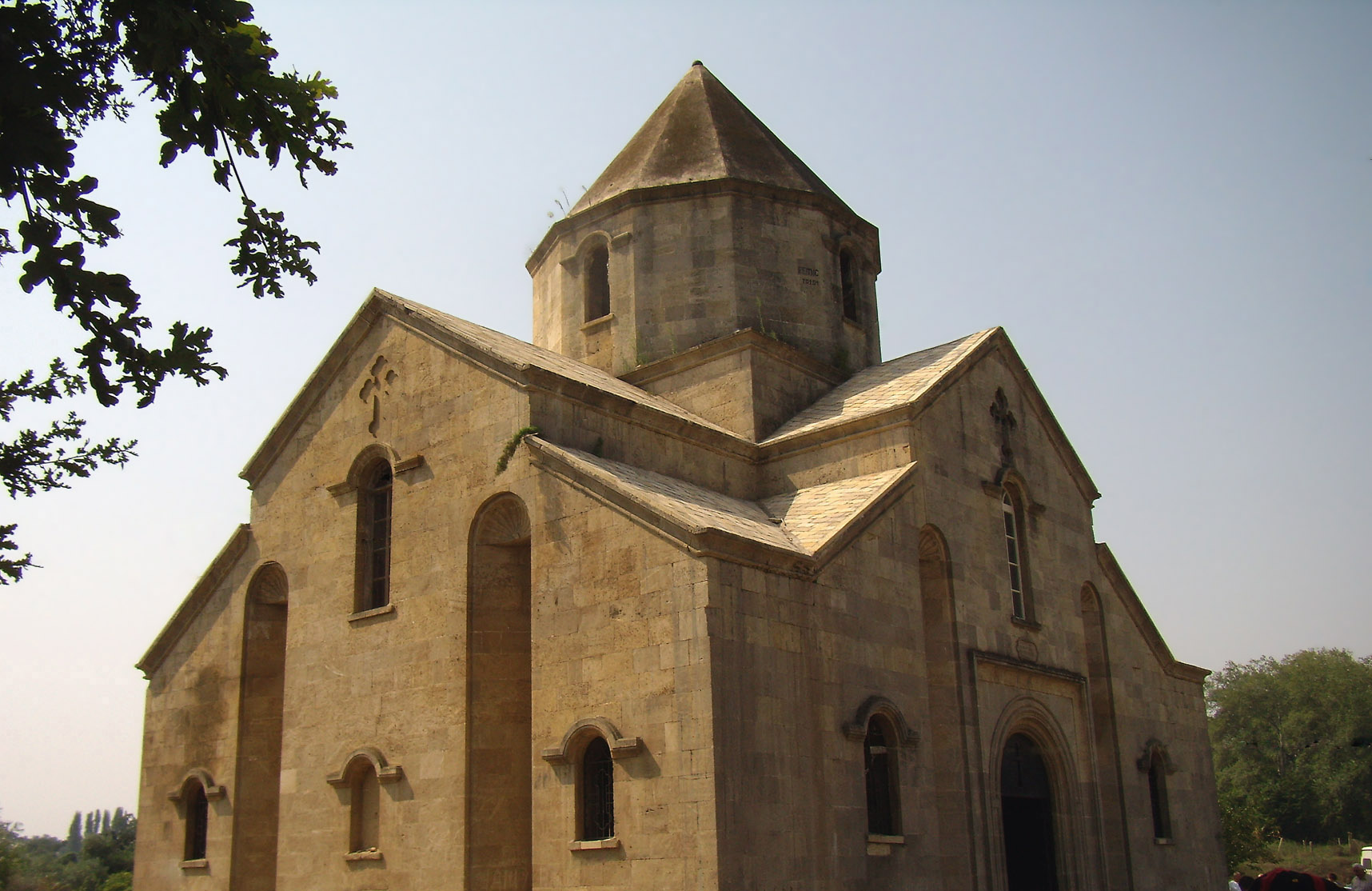
- St Grigoris Church, Nyugdi.

- Location within Republic of Dagestan Location within Russia
- Coordinates: 41°52′N 48°27′E
- Country: Russia
- Region: Republic of Dagestan
- District: Derbentsky District
- Elevation: 18 m (59 ft)

Population (2021)
  - Total: 2,081 people
- Time zone: UTC+03:00
- Postal code: 368615

Nyugdi (Russian: Нюгди; Azerbaijani: Нүғди, Nüğdi; Lezgian: Нюгди; Judeo-Tat: Нуьгдигь-Муьшгуьр, Муьшгуьр) is a rural locality (a selo) in Derbentsky District of the Republic of Dagestan, Russia.

== Geography ==
The village is located 30 km southeast of the city of Derbent, on the left bank of the Gyulgerichay River. The distance to the Caspian Sea coast is about 5 km.

== Etymology ==
Translated from the Judeo-Tat language, Nyugdi means “New Settlement”. The Mountain Jewish name of the village is Nyugdi-Myushkur or Myushkur.

== History ==
This is a historical Mountain Jewish village. The exact date of foundation has not been established, but according to some information, Mountain Jews lived in the village already at the end of the 18th century. In 1867, there were two cheders operating in the village. The synagogue building, converted into a club during Soviet times, has survived to this day. At the end of the 19th century, the Jewish population of Nyugdi continued to expand due to immigrants from Jewish villages in the mountainous part of Southern Dagestan. The main occupation of the village residents was viticulture. In 1918-1919, Nyugdi was twice devastated by the mountaineers and the Armed Forces of South Russia, because of which all the houses were destroyed. In 1925, the population continued to live in dugouts. With the establishment of Soviet power, the village of Nyugdi became part of the Belidzhi village council of the Maskut section of the Kaytago-Tabasaransky okrug. In 1928 it was allocated to an independent village council. In 1930, two Jewish collective farms named after Mikhail Kalinin and named after Kliment Voroshilov were organized. Since 1959, it was a branch of the Belidzhi state farm (in 1982 it was renamed “60 Years of the USSR”). In Nyugdi, old Jewish and Christian cemeteries have been preserved.

== Population ==
In 1869, out of 74 households in the village, 68 were Mountain Jewish. In 1897, Mountain Jews made up 94% of the population of the village. Currently, only a few Mountains Jewish families live in Nyugdi. Most of the village's Jewish community emigrated to Israel in the 1990s.

According to the 2021 census, Nyugdi had a population of 2,081.

== Attractions ==
On the outskirts of the village, in the former village of Molla Khalil, there is the Armenian Church of St. Grigoris, built in memory of the events of the 4th century associated with the preaching and martyrdom of St. Grigoris, the first bishop of Caucasian Albania.

== Notable people ==
- Sergey Izgiyayev, poet
- Hizgil Avshalumov, writer

== See also ==
- St Grigoris Church, Nyugdi
