= Amaras Monastery =

Armenian monastery

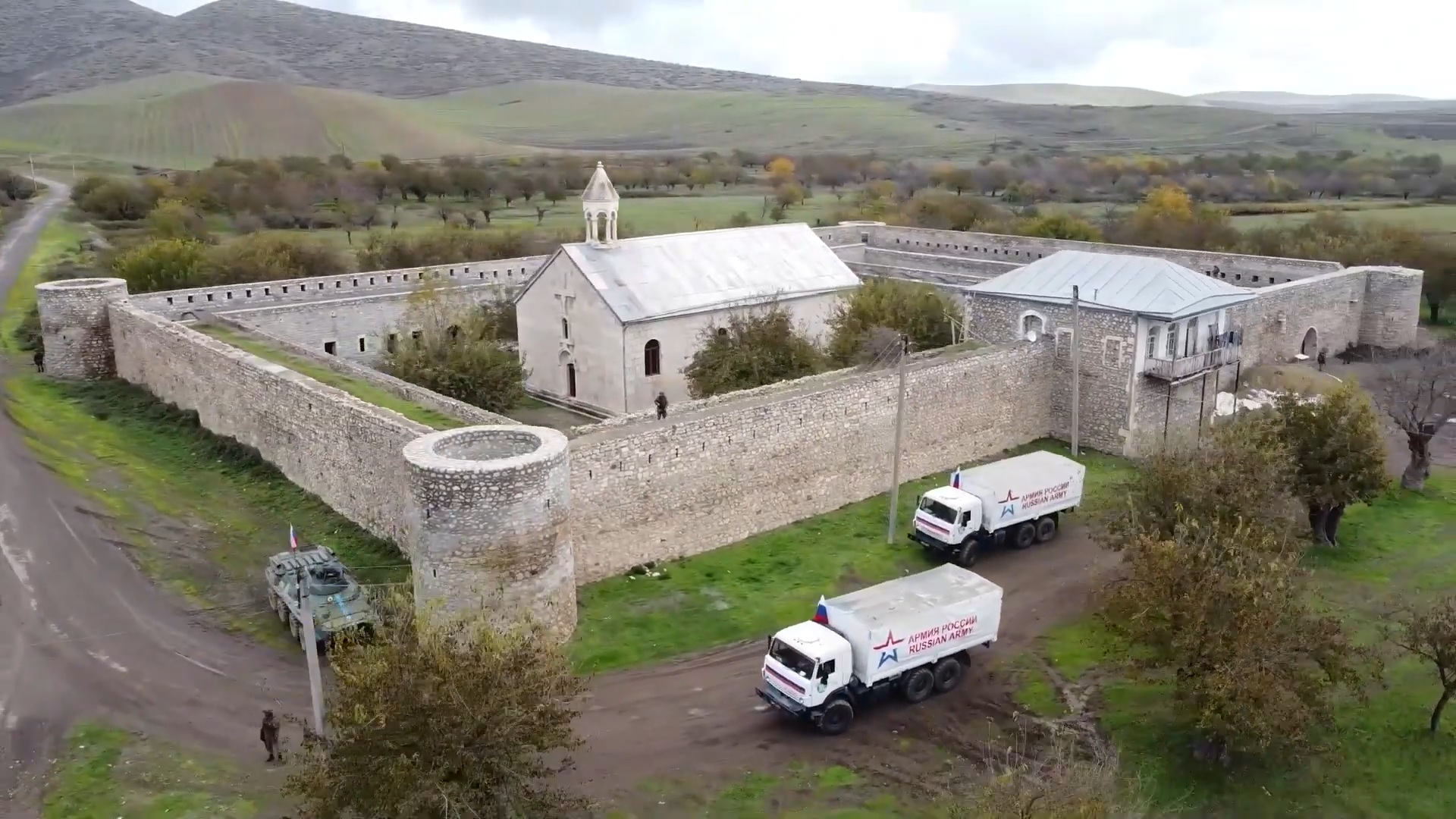
- The monastery in 2021

- Location within Azerbaijan

Religion
- Affiliation: Armenian Apostolic Church

Location
- Location: near the village of Sos, Nagorno-Karabakh
- Country: Azerbaijan
- Coordinates: 39.684°N 47.057°E

Architecture
- Style: Armenian
- Completed: 4th century (established); 1858 (rebuilt)

Website
- www.amaras.org

Amaras Monastery (Armenian: Ամարաս վանք) is an Armenian monastery near the village of Sos, in the region of Nagorno-Karabakh, Azerbaijan. It was a prominent religious and educational center in medieval Armenia.

Azerbaijan denies the monastery's Armenian Apostolic heritage, instead falsely referring to it as "Caucasian Albanian".

== History ==
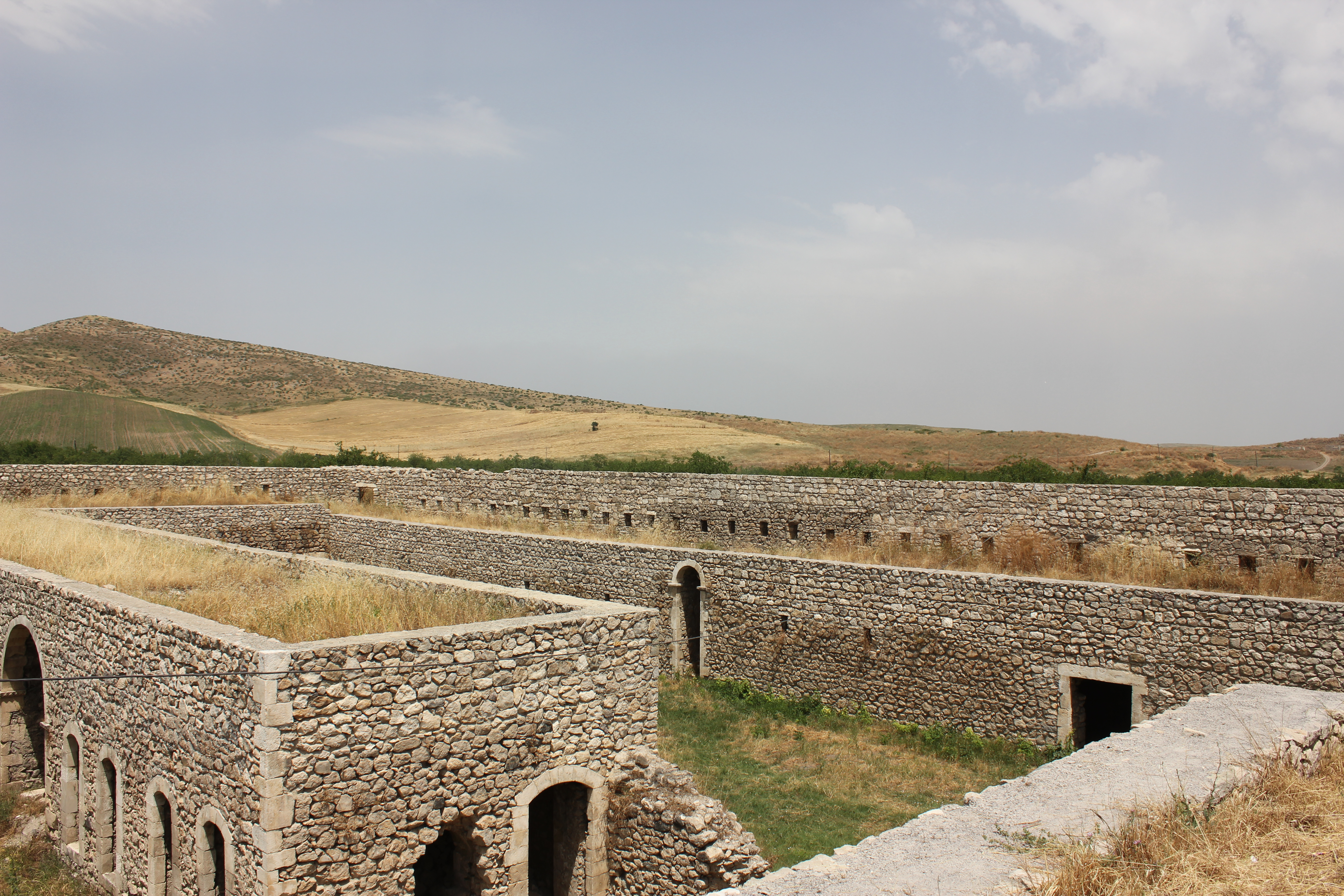
Monastery complex

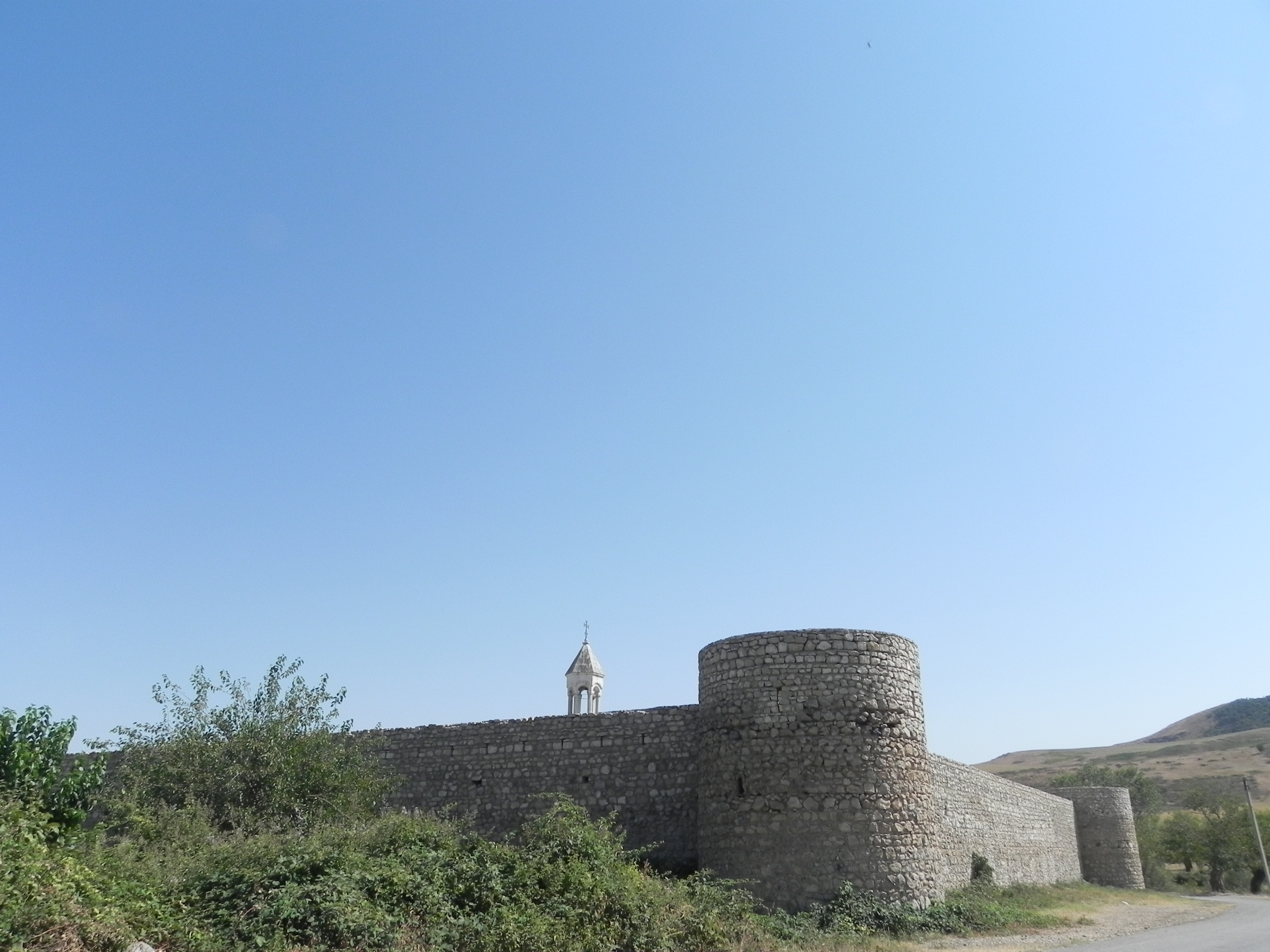
Defensive walls

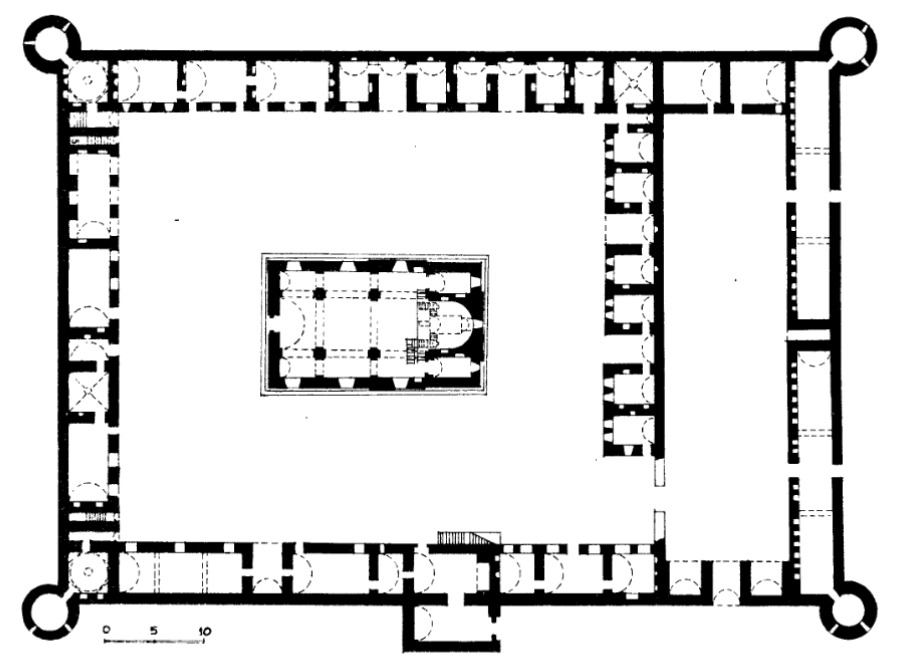
plan of Amaras complex

=== 4th–5th centuries ===
According to medieval chroniclers Faustus Byuzand and Movses Kaghankatvatsi, St. Gregory the Illuminator, the patron saint and evangelizer of Armenia, founded the Amaras Monastery at the start of the fourth century.

Amaras is the burial place of St. Gregory the Illuminator's grandson, St. Grigoris (died in 338).

At the beginning of the fifth century Mesrop Mashtots, the inventor of the Armenian alphabet, established in Amaras the first school in Artsakh that used his script.

=== Destruction and restoration (13th–19th centuries) ===
The monastery was plundered in the thirteenth century by the Mongols, destroyed in 1387 during Timur's invasion, and demolished again in the sixteenth century. It underwent radical restructuring in the second quarter of the seventeenth century when the surviving defensive walls were constructed.

Melik Shahnazar II initiated construction in the monastery during the late 18th century.

Amaras was later abandoned, and in the first half of the nineteenth century the monastery was used as a frontier fortress by Russian imperial troops.

The Armenian Apostolic Church reclaimed the monastery in 1848. The monastery's church appears to have been severely damaged during the period of military occupation, to the extent that a new church had to be constructed on the site of the old one. This new church, dedicated to St. Grigoris, was built in 1858 and paid for by the Armenians of the city of Shushi.

=== Modern period (19th century–present) ===
The monastery was abandoned during the Soviet period and was reopened in 1992.

During the 2023 Nagorno-Karabakh clashes the monastery was reported to fall under Azerbaijani control on 20 September 2023.

== Tomb of St. Grigoris ==
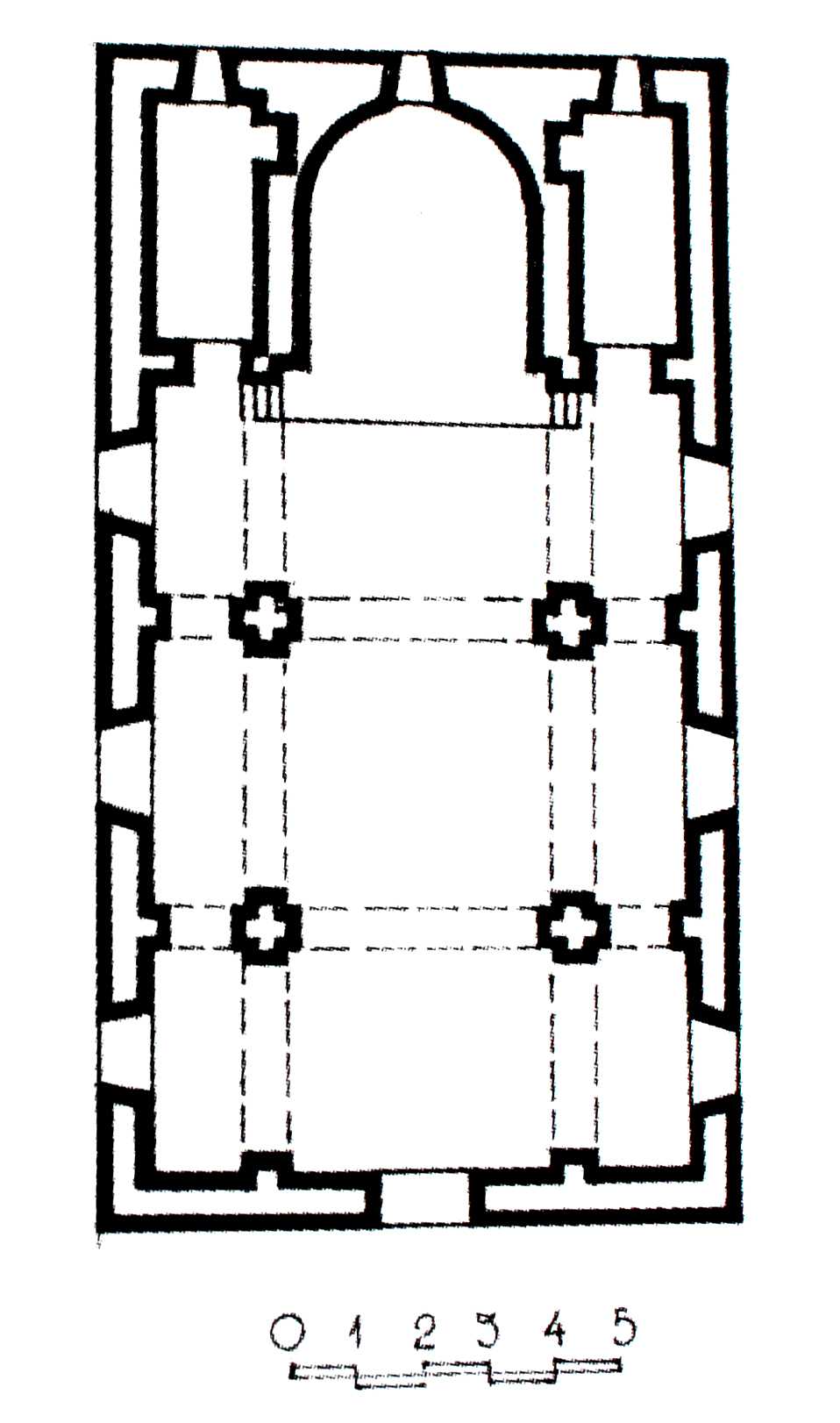
Plan of St. Grigoris Tomb

St. Grigoris was originally buried at the eastern end of the now-vanished St. Gregory Church. Archeologists think that the eastern entrance of the tomb, which is unusual for traditional church architecture, is based on the Church of the Holy Sepulchre in Jerusalem. In 489 Vachagan III the Pious, king of Caucasian Albania, renovated Amaras, restoring the church and constructing a new chapel for the remains of St. Grigoris. In later centuries, a church was built over this chapel-tomb.

Under the altar of the St. Grigoris church is a tomb chamber, reached at its western end by twin flights of steps. A blocked passage at its eastern end indicates that there was originally an entrance from that direction as well. The barrel-vaulted tomb chamber is 1.9 m wide, 3.75 m long, and 3.5 m high. The upper half of the structure originally projected 1.5 to 2 m above ground level, but it is now entirely underground. Carved details date it stylistically to the 5th century.

== Gallery ==
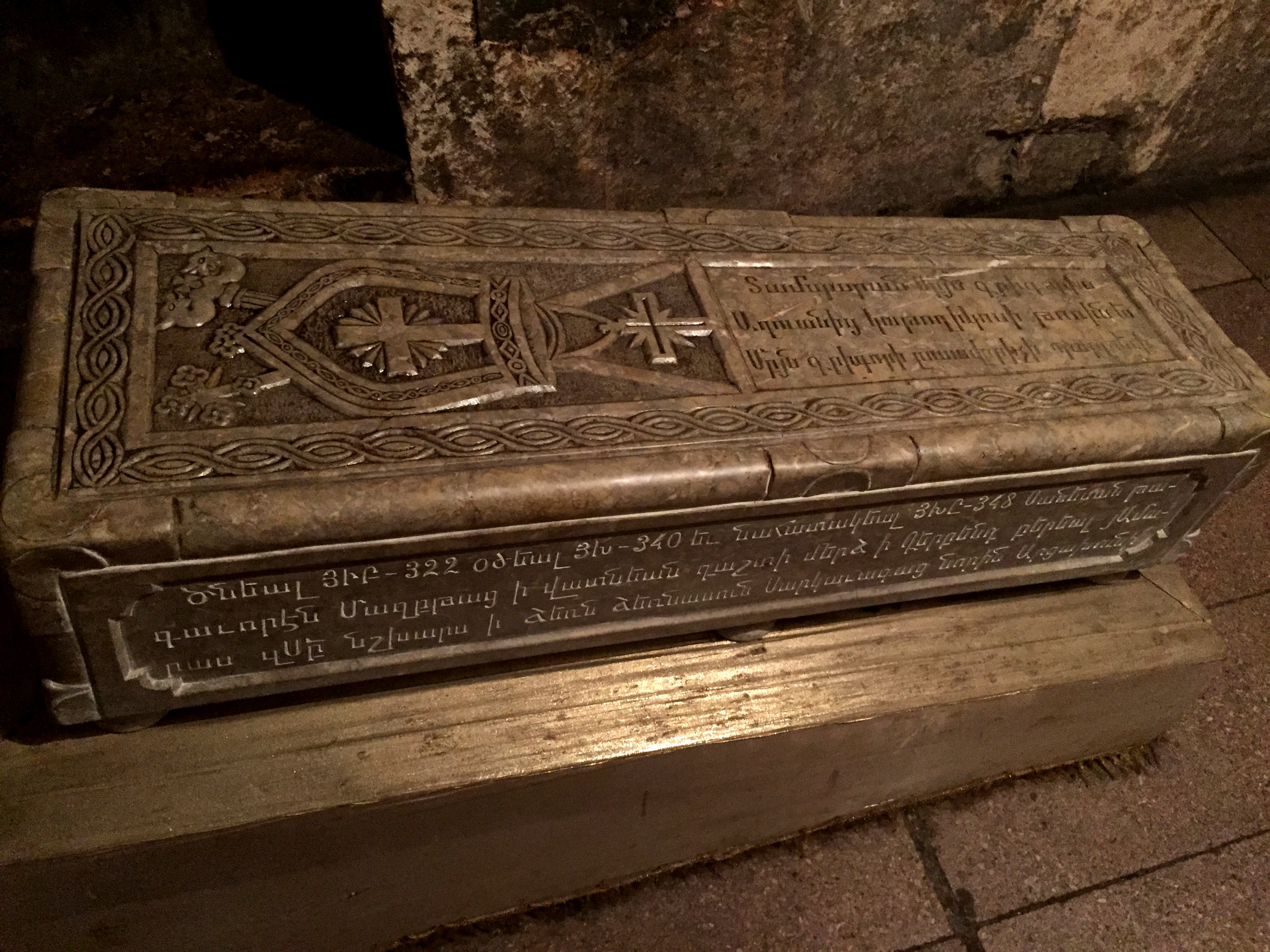
Sarcophagus of St. Grigoris in the funeral crypt

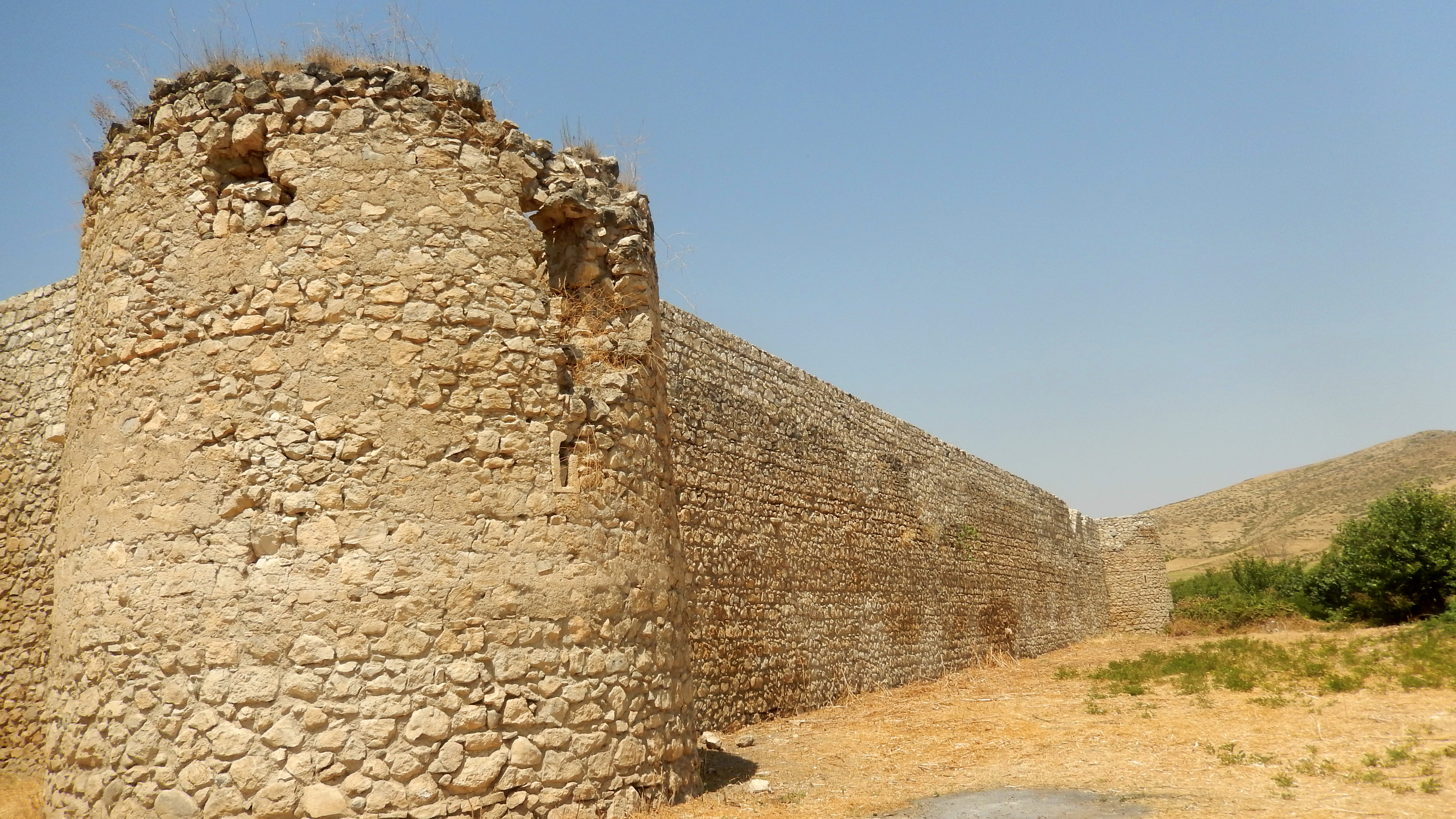
Protective walls

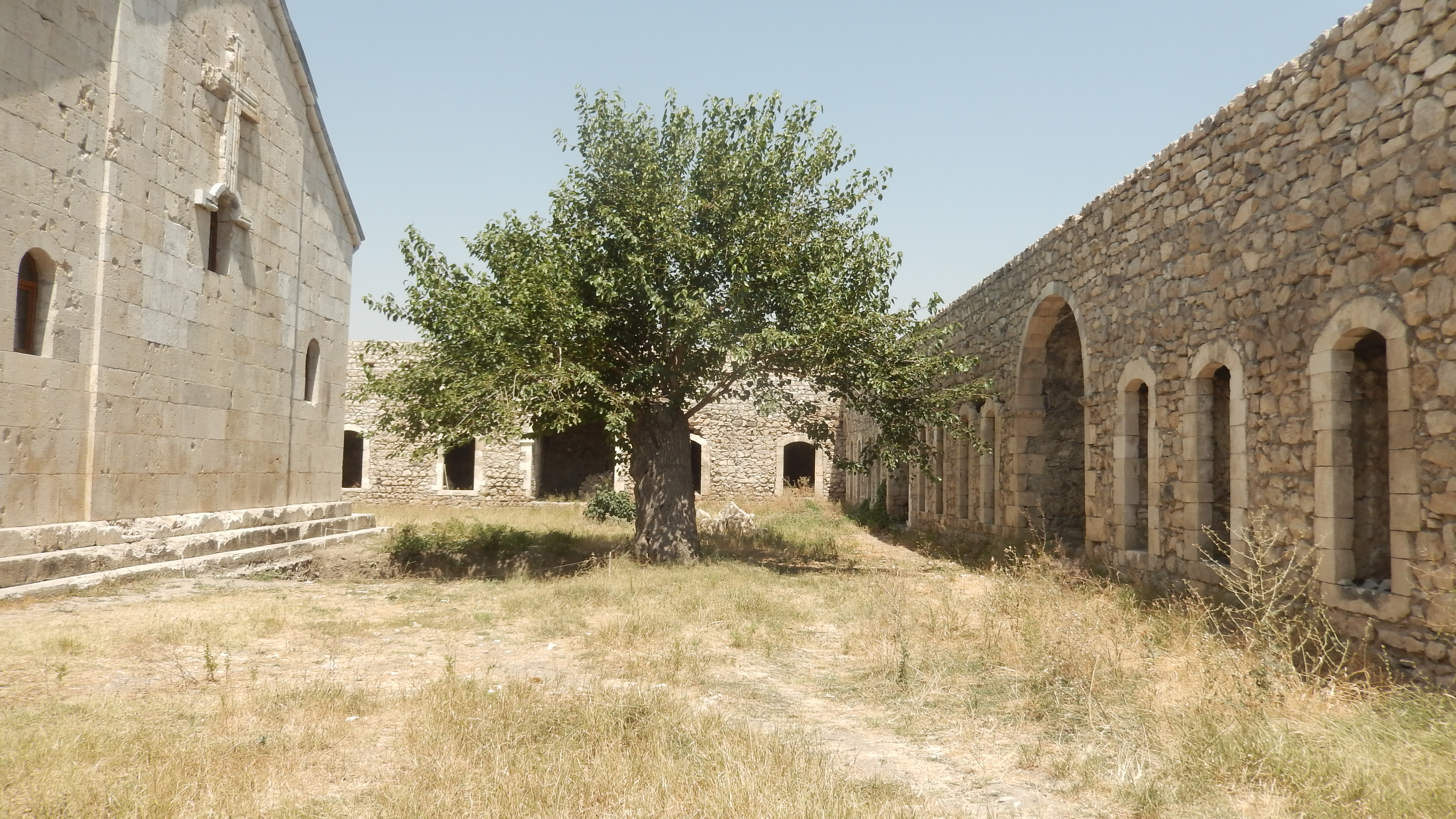
Courtyard

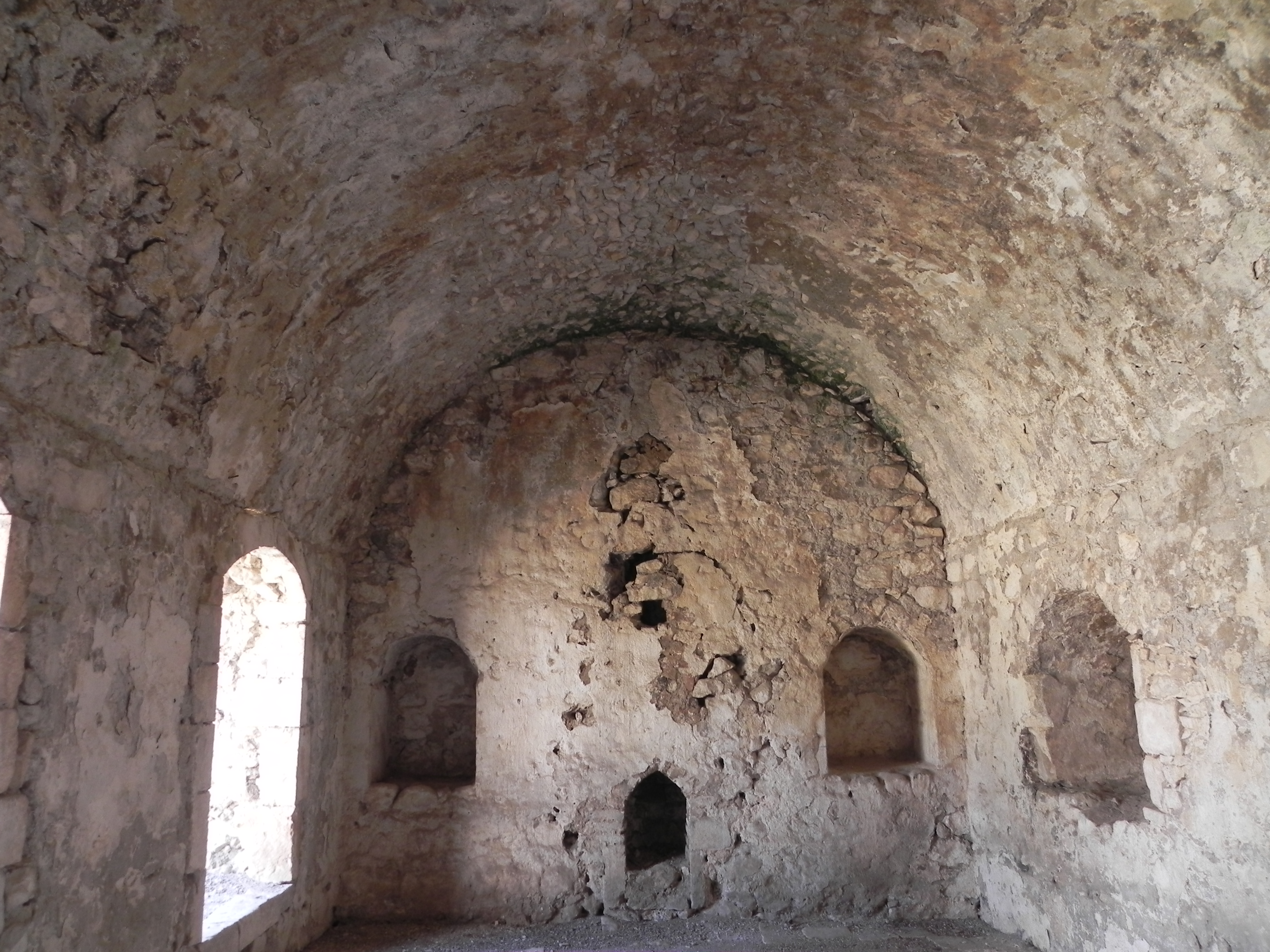
Monastery vaults

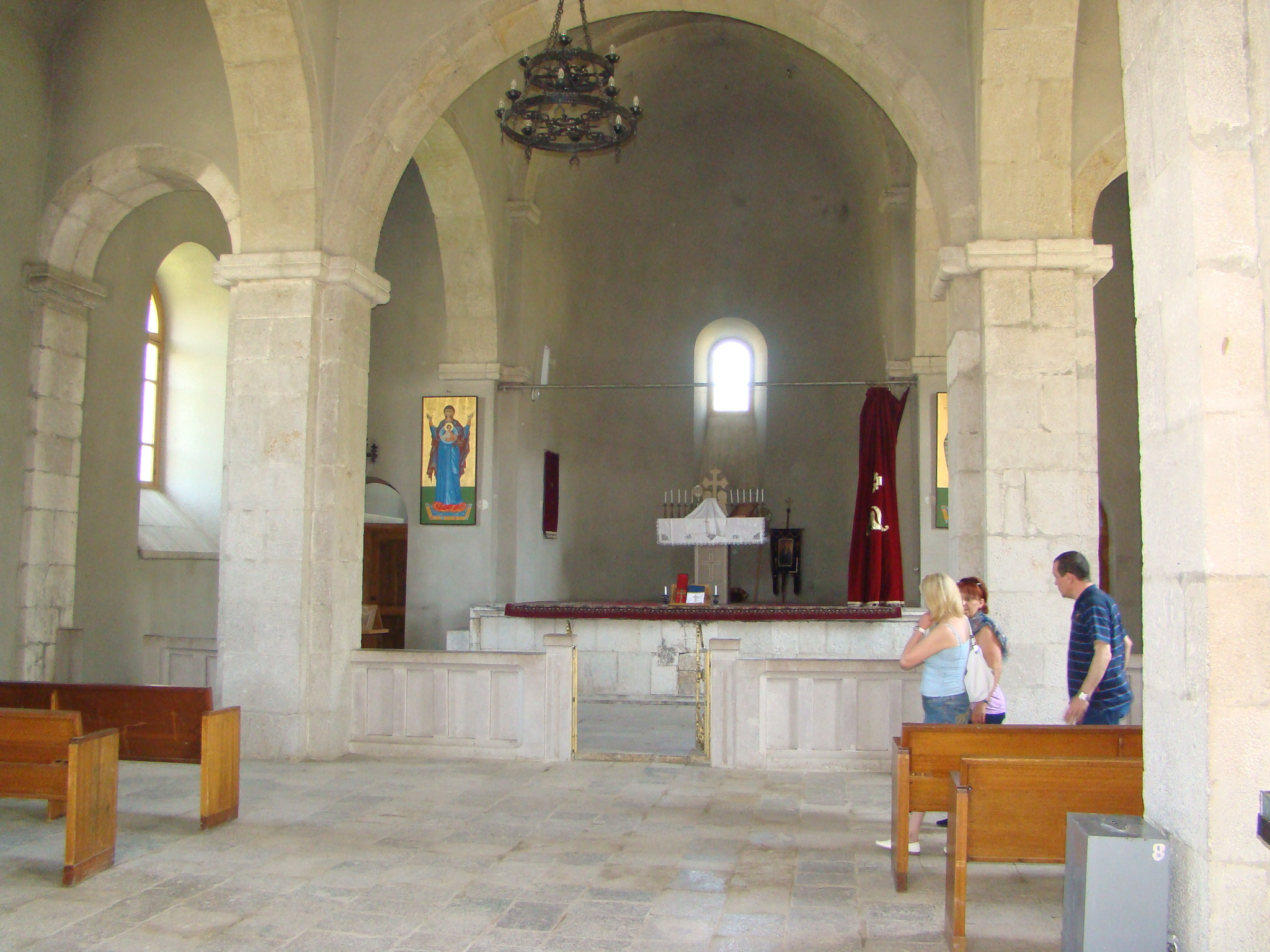
Church of St. Grigoris interior

== See also ==
- Armenian culture
- Armenian architecture
- Architecture of Azerbaijan
- Culture of Nagorno-Karabakh
