= Tashkapur =

Tashkapur Ташкапур ЦIунрегIе
- Selo
- Location within Republic of Dagestan Location within Russia
- Coordinates: 42°24′N 47°10′E
- Country: Russia
- Region: Republic of Dagestan
- District: Levashinsky District
- Time zone: UTC+3:00

Tashkapur (Russian: Ташкапур; Dargwa: ЦIунрегIе) is a rural locality (a selo) in Khadzhalmakhinsky Selsoviet, Levashinsky District, Republic of Dagestan, Russia. The population was 1,419 as of 2010.

== Geography ==
Tashkapur is located 16 km west of Levashi (the district's administrative centre) by road. Khadzhalmakhi and Nizhniye Arshi are the nearest rural localities.

== Nationalities ==
Dargins live there.
