= Grigoris (catholicos) =

St. Grigoris of Albania Սուրբ Գրիգորիս Աղվանացի
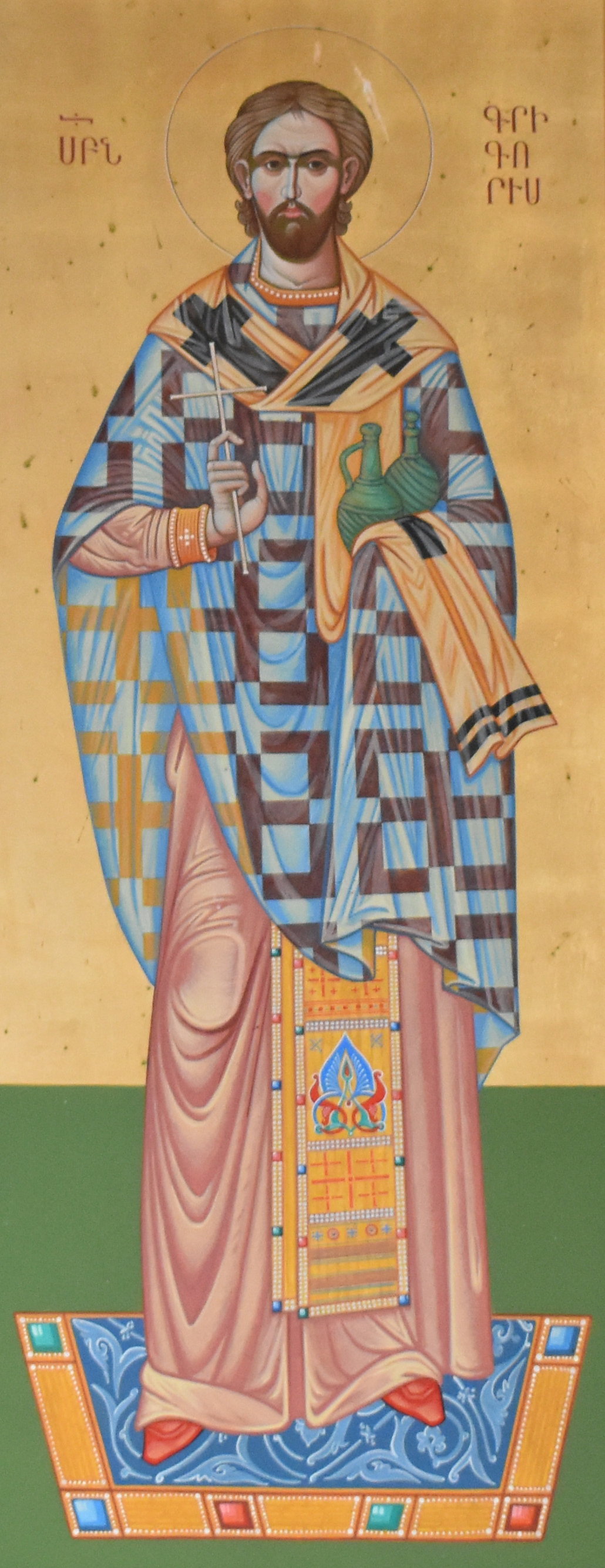
- A modern painting of Grigoris at Amaras Monastery

Catholicos of Caucasian Albania
- Born: 4th century
- Hometown: Caesaria Mazaca, Roman Empire
- Died: c. 334; Vatnean Valley, Chola near present-day Derbent, Russia or Paytakaran, near modern Beyləqan, Azerbaijan
- Honored in: Armenian Apostolic Church
- Major shrine: Amaras Monastery
- Feast: 3rd Saturday before the Nativity of Jesus; 3rd Sunday of Transfiguration of Jesus; Monday after the 5th Sunday after Exaltation of the Cross

Grigoris (early 4th century – c. 330 or c. 334 AD; Armenian: Գրիգորիս Աղվանացի, romanized: Grigoris Aghvanatsi, lit. 'Grigoris of Albania') was the Catholicos of the Church of Caucasian Albania ca. 325–330 AD. He is considered a saint martyr by the Armenian Apostolic Church.

== Background ==
Grigoris was born in Caesaria, Cappadocia and was the grandson of Gregory the Illuminator an originally Parthian Christian missionary who converted the Armenian king to Christianity and became the first official governor of the Armenian Apostolic Church. In addition, both Grigoris' father Vrtanes, and brother Husik, were consecutive catholicoi of Armenia.

== Legend ==
By 325, Christianity in Armenia had gained strength and Armenian religious leaders went on to proselytise the neighbouring states. According to the tenth-century author Movses Kaghankatvatsi, Gregory the Illuminator left Armenia to spread Christianity in Caucasian Albania, where on his orders there was built a church later to become the Amaras Monastery. He then ordained his grandson Grigoris, at the time only 15 years old, to become the patriarch of the Church of Caucasian Albania. However, there is another tradition attaining the ordination to his uncle St. Aristakes. He is considered a successor to Thomas of Satala, apparently first catholicos of Albania serving during the time of King Urnayr of Albania. Traditionally he is also considered to bring relics of Zechariah and Saint Pantaleon to church built in the town of Tsri.

== Death ==
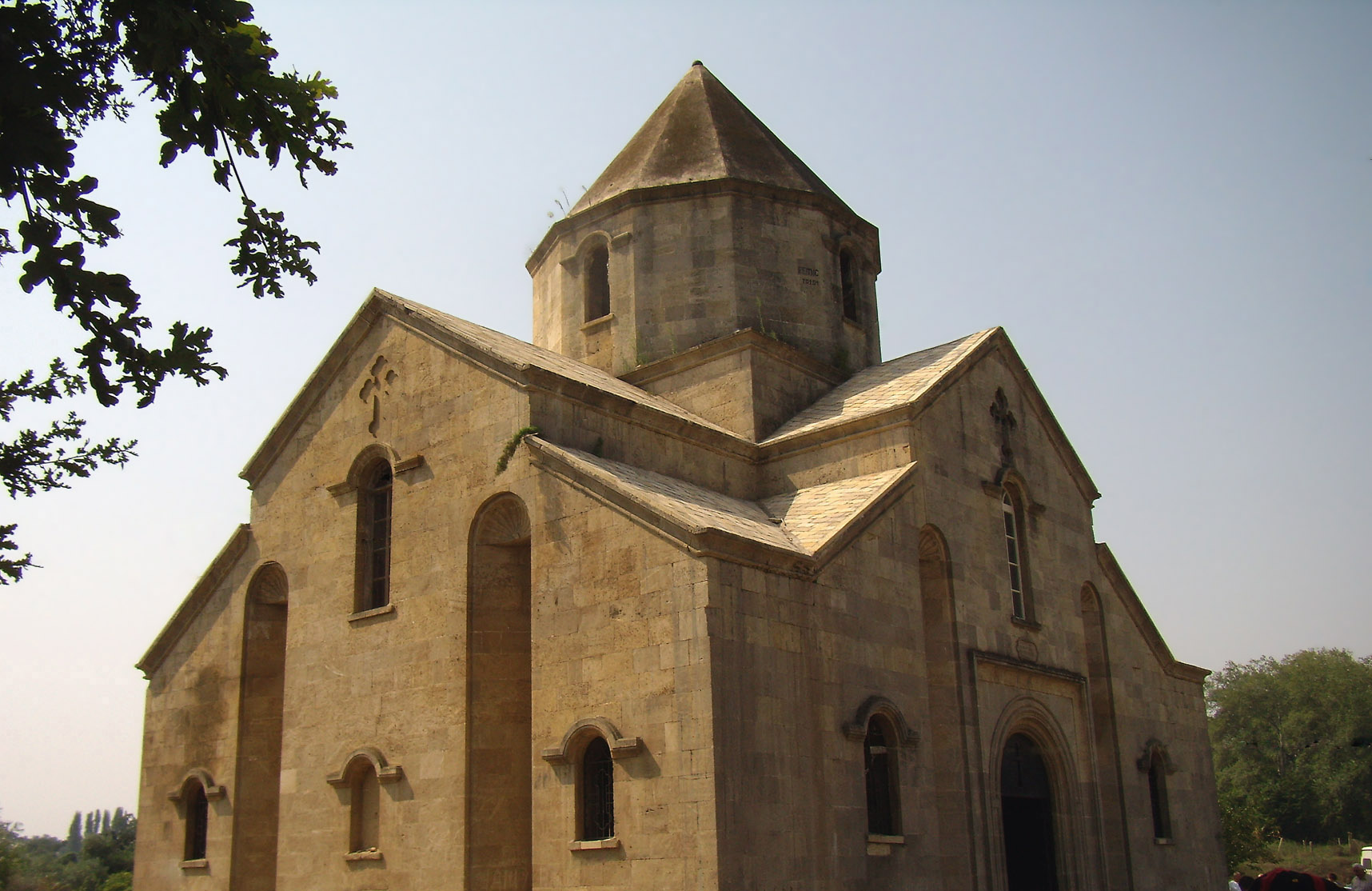
St Grigoris Church in Nyugdi, Dagestan, Russia

According to Faustus of Byzantium, Grigoris sometime later departed for the Kingdom of Maskuts (located along the northeastern shore of the present day Republic of Azerbaijan and south Dagestani shore of the Caspian Sea) to preach Christianity, its ruler Sanesan (according to Moses of Chorene, his name was Sanatruk and he was a relative of Tiridates III). Grigoris was trampled to death by mounted Maskut soldiers in the Vatnean Fields, traditionally considered near the present-day village of Nughdi 37 kilometres south of Derbent. However, according to other sources, the martyrdom took place in Paytakaran, just next to shore of Kura river. Evangelizing activities wasn't fruitless, however. According to legends, he converted sons of Sanesan – namely Moses, Daniel and Elijah along with 387 followers, however they were martyred by Sanesan on 20 August (Navasard 9) of that year.

Grigoris' body was taken to the Amaras Monastery buried in an unmarked grave near the northern entrance. According to Movses Kaghankatvatsi, in 489, Vachagan III the Pious, King of Caucasian Albania, recovered Grigoris' relics and buried them in a tomb within the Amaras Monastery. Grigoris' place of death in Nughdi was marked by the construction of a chapel at an unknown date, later rebuilt into a church, and venerated by local Christians and Muslims alike.

== Veneration ==
The Armenian Church celebrates feast of Grigoris on the 3rd Saturday before the Nativity of Jesus or on the 3rd Sunday of the holiday Vardavar (Transfiguration of Jesus) together with other sons and grandsons of Gregory the Illuminator, as well as on Monday after the 5th Sunday after Exaltation of the Cross (finding of relics).

== Scholarly debates ==
Zaza Aleksidze and Jean-Pierre Mahé considered the legend of Grigoris a later invention, limiting his territory of influence to Gugark: "...a close examination of the historiographic data should lead us to the conclusion that Grigoris never preached in Albania and played no role in the Christianisation of the country. Indeed, the Buzandaran, which contains the first written account of his martyrdom, mentions him not as a bishop sent to Albania but as the 'Catholicos of the Iberian and Albanian march.'" Hranush Kharatyan, however said Aleksidze and Mahé misrepresented the words of both Faustus and Khorenatsi.
