= Bryansk, Republic of Dagestan =

Bryansk Брянск
- Selo
- Location within Republic of Dagestan Location within Russia
- Coordinates: 44°19′N 46°59′E
- Country: Russia
- Region: Republic of Dagestan
- District: Kizlyarsky District
- Time zone: UTC+3:00

Bryansk (Russian: Брянск) is a rural locality (a selo) and the administrative centre of Bryansky Selsoviet, Kizlyarsky District, Republic of Dagestan, Russia. The population was 658 as of 2010. There are 6 streets.

== Geography ==
Bryansk is located 277 km northeast of Kizlyar (the district's administrative centre) by road. Tushilovka and Novye Bukhty are the nearest rural localities.

== Nationalities ==
Russians, Avars and Dargins live there.
