= Holy Cross Exaltation Monastery, Kizlyar =

Holy Cross Exaltation Monastery
- Крестовоздвиженский монастырь
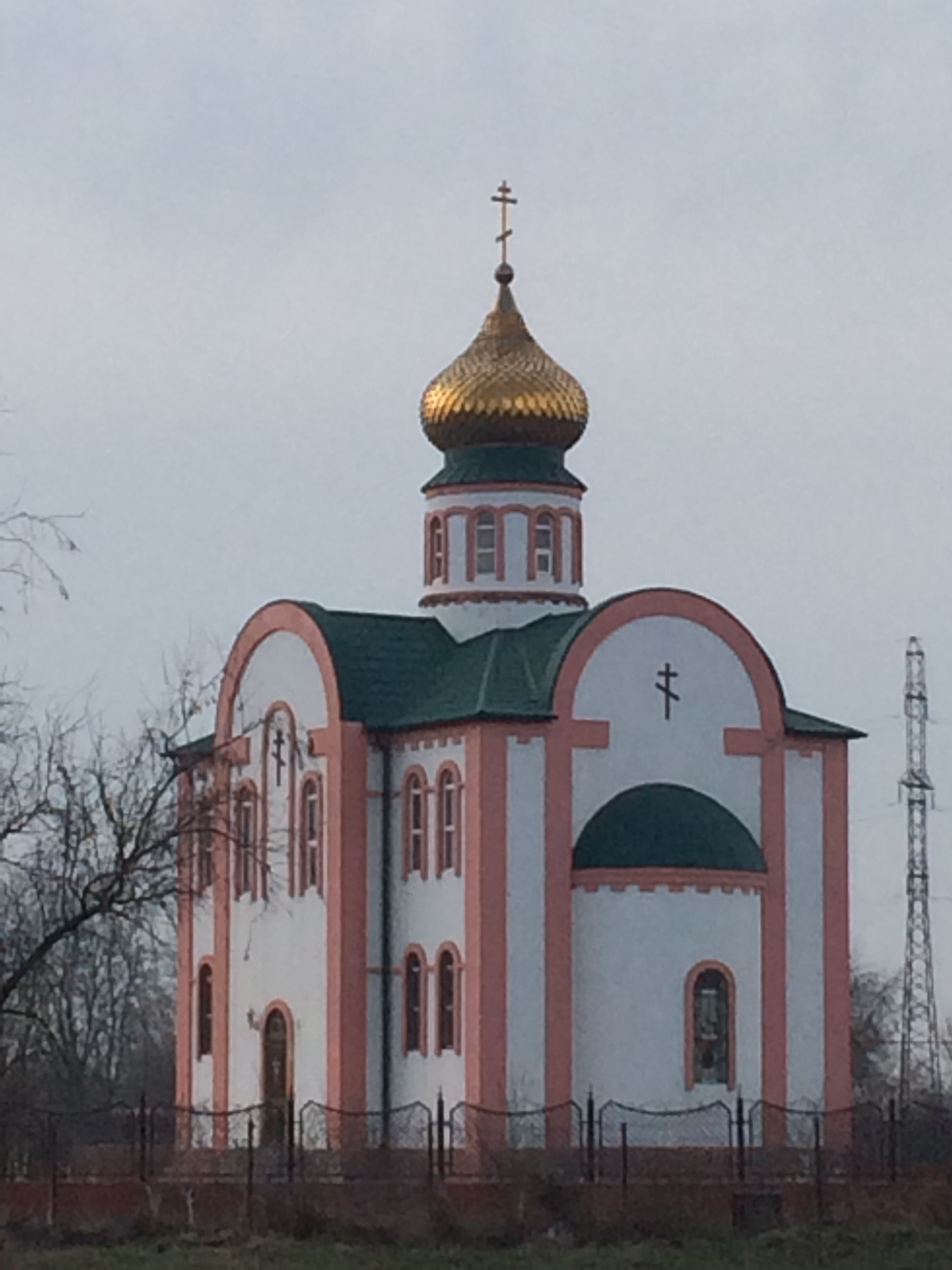

- Location within Russia
- Interactive map of Holy Cross Exaltation Monastery

Monastery information
- Order: Russian Orthodox Church
- Denomination: Eastern Orthodoxy
- Established: 1736
- Disestablished: c. 1918–2007
- Reestablished: May 5, 2007
- Diocese: Diocese of Makhachkala

People
- Founder: Archimandrite Daniil
- Important associated figures: Abbess Nina

Architecture
- Style: Russian Revival architecture

Site
- Location: Kizlyar, Dagestan
- Country: Russia
- Coordinates: 43°51′41″N 46°41′52″E
- Public access: Yes
- Website: goragospodnya.ru/2018/03/29/krestovozdvizhenskij-zhenskij-monastyr-v-kizlyare/

The Holy Cross Exaltation Monastery (Russian: Крестовоздвиженский монастырь) is a women's Russian Orthodox monastery in Kizlyar, Dagestan. It was presumably founded in 1736 by Archimandrite Daniil as a men's monastery. The monastery was violently suppressed as part of the Soviet persecution of Christians before being revived in the early 21st century.

== History ==
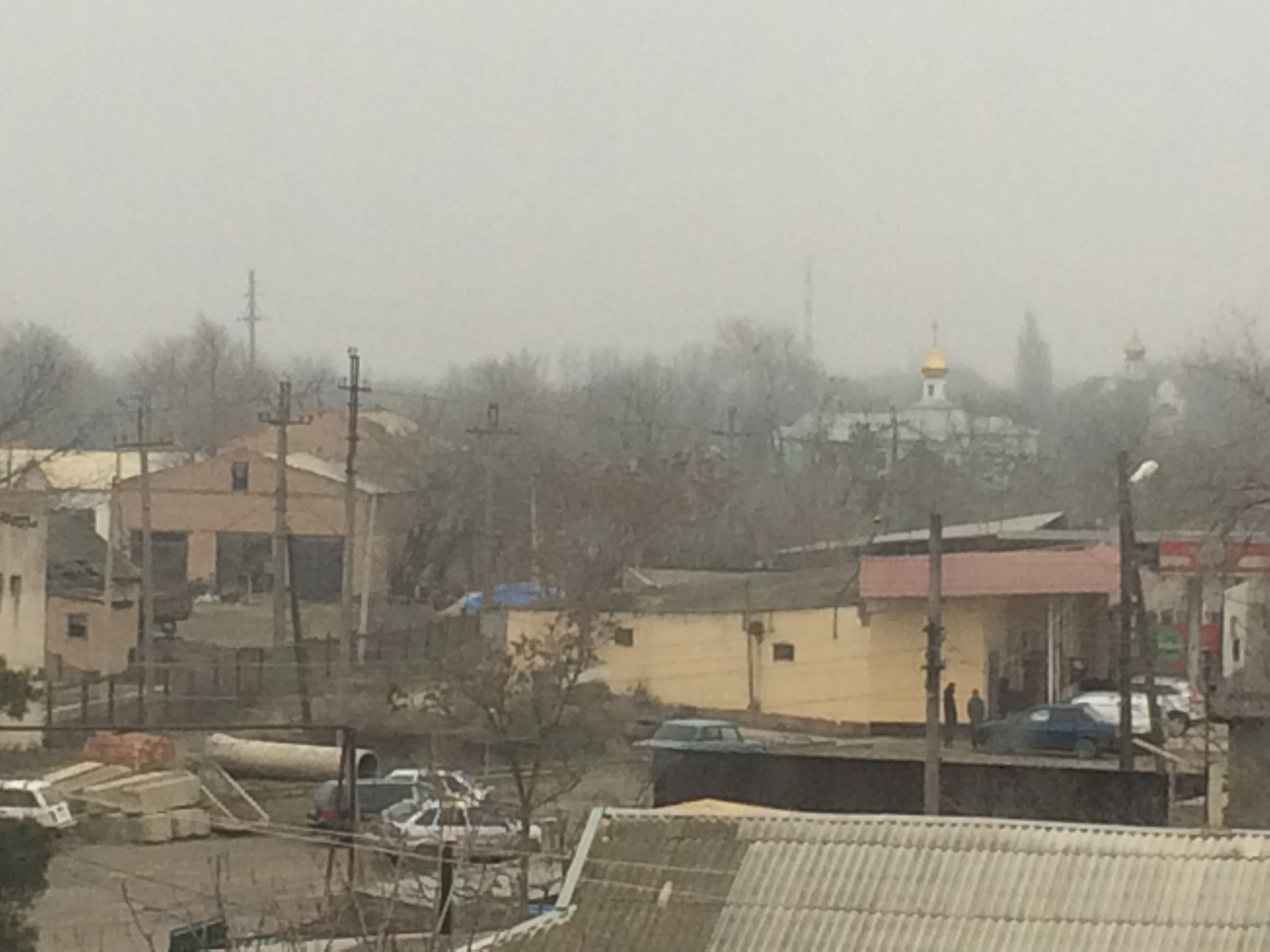
Holy Cross Exaltation Monastery

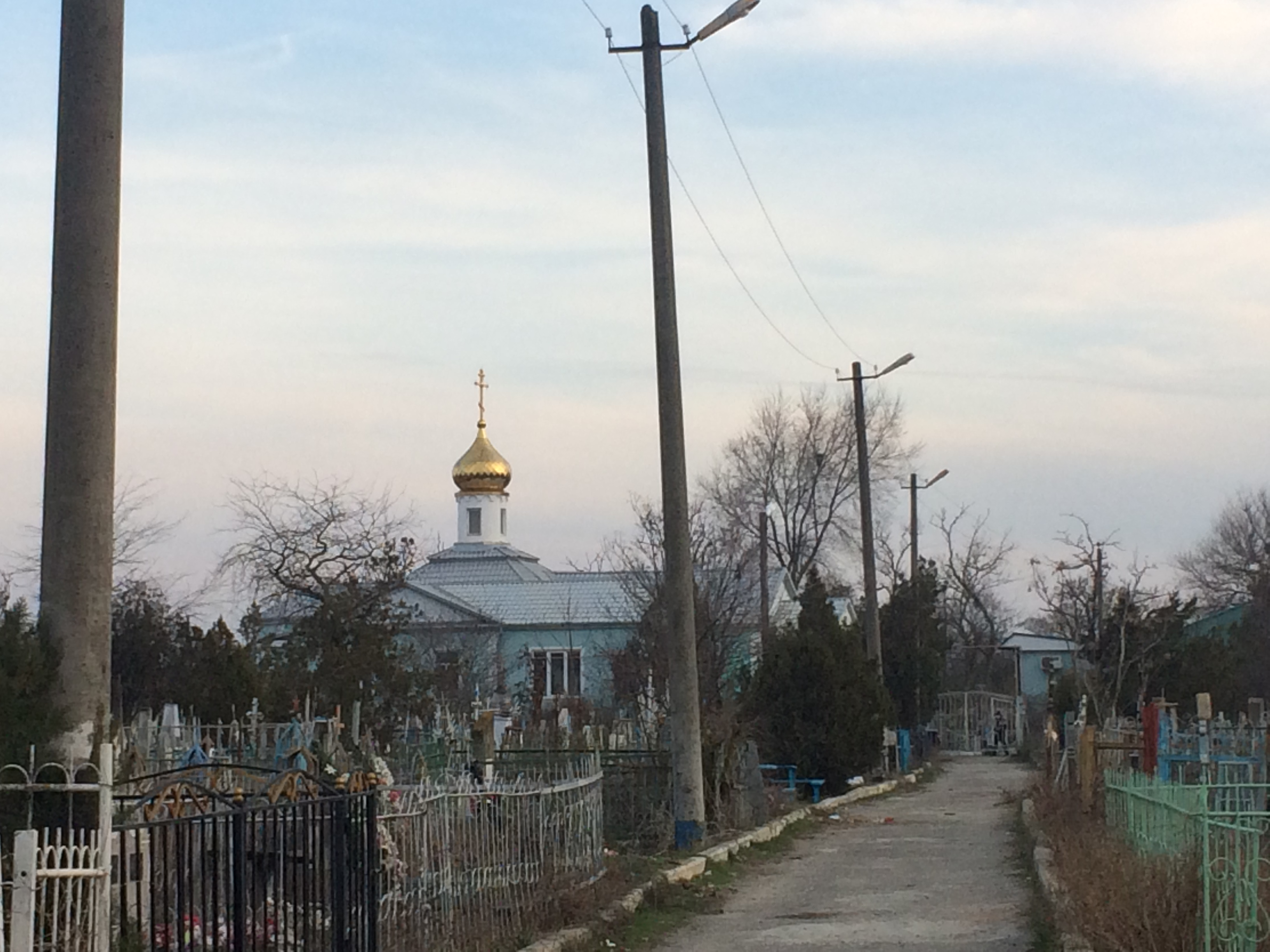
Holy Cross Exaltation Monastery

In 1735, under the terms of the Treaty of Ganja between Russia and Iran, the Holy Cross Fortress on the Sulak River was abolished. The garrison and administrative institutions of this fortress were transferred to the newly founded city of Kizlyar by General-in-Chief Levashov, Vasily Yakovlevich.

Kizlyar had an important military and strategic position. The city was also the front line of the spread of Orthodoxy in the Caucasus. Taking this into account, Archbishop John of Manglia petitioned for the opening of a monastery at the Church of the Exaltation of the Cross.

The first abbot of the monastery was Archimandrite Daniil, who came from a family of Georgian princes. He also brought the Georgian Icon of the Mother of God to the monastery.

The monastery was subjected to several devastations by the highlanders. In 1744, the monastery burned down in a major fire. The heyday of the monastery was in the late 18th and early 19th centuries. Abbot Anthony brought order to the monastery. Numerous vineyards were planted, bringing income to the monastery. In addition, the monastery owned 2,500 dessiatins of arable land, 4 shops that were rented out, and a summer house.

By the middle of the 19th century, the monastery had fallen into decline. The reason for this was the devastation of the monastery and Kizlyar on November 1, 1831, by the Chechens, led by Ghazi Muhammad, as well as the seizure of the monastery lands by the Cossacks.

Life in the monastery began to revive again only in the 80s of the XIX century. By this time, there were 13 monks and 15 novices in the monastery. In 1904, the second temple of the Great Martyr George the Victorious was built in the monastery. But the murder of the abbot, Hieromonk Gelasius, in 1906 again led the entire economy into decline.

In 1908, the Holy Synod issued a decree on the transformation of the monastery into a convent. The first abbess of the convent was Abbess Nina. Under her leadership, the monastery was revived. Already in 1911, 5 mantle nuns and 70 novices, including 14 cassock nuns, lived there. A farmstead was built in Port-Petrovsk.

=== Soviet period ===
In 1918, the new revolutionary government organized a robbery in the monastery. Several sisters were killed for resisting. With the occupation of the city by the Volunteer Army, an investigation was conducted, and the criminals were punished. With the restoration of Soviet power, the abbess of the monastery, Abbess Antonina, with several nuns went to the mountains and founded a new monastery there. But the punishment of the criminals was regarded as a reprisal against revolutionaries. On this basis, a search was announced for the nuns. The new monastery was discovered by the secret services, and all the nuns, led by Abbess Antonina, were shot.

According to some reports, Abbess Antonina managed to escape arrest, for several years she hid in Vladikavkaz, then worked in a hotel in Rostov-on-Don. She was arrested again in 1925 or 1926, after which information about her was lost.

The monastery was closed. Its churches at various times housed the revolutionary committee, a warehouse, and a store.

At present, most of the buildings have not survived; one of the former monastery buildings houses a tuberculosis dispensary.

=== Revival ===
On May 5, 2007, the consecration of the revived Holy Cross Exaltation Monastery took place. A chapel in the Old Russian cemetery of Kizlyar was given over to the monastery. The task of restoring the monastery was entrusted to Abbess Mikhaila (Safonova), who arrived in Kizlyar from the Holy Kazan Convent in Yaroslavl with two nuns. At present, 9 nuns already live in the monastery. The cell and abbess buildings are being built. The chapel and the altar section have been restored. There is a project to build the monastery's own church.

== Abbots ==
- Archimandrite Daniil (1736-?)
- Ieronim (1761-?)
- Hegumen Anthony (?)
- Archpriest Dimitry (Gremyachensky)
- Archimandrite Samuel (1870–1870)
- Hegumen Nathanael (1883-?)
- Hegumen Innocent (1883-?)
- Acting Rector Hieromonk Vlasiy (?-1884)
- Archimandrite Alexy (1884–1887)
- Archpriest? Nobiletov (1887–1897)
- Archimandrite Philophy (Stashevsky) (1897–1900)
- Hieromonk Gelasius (1901–1906)
- Abbess Nina (1908–1913)
- Abbess Antonina (1913–1918)
- Abbess Mikhaila (Safonova) (2007–2009)
- Nun Antonina (Pavlova) (2009–present)
