= Tarumovsky District =

Tarumovsky District Тарумовский район (Russian)
- District

Other transcription(s)
  - Avar: Тарумовка мухъ
  - Dargwa: Тарумовкала къатI
  - Nogay: Тарумовка район
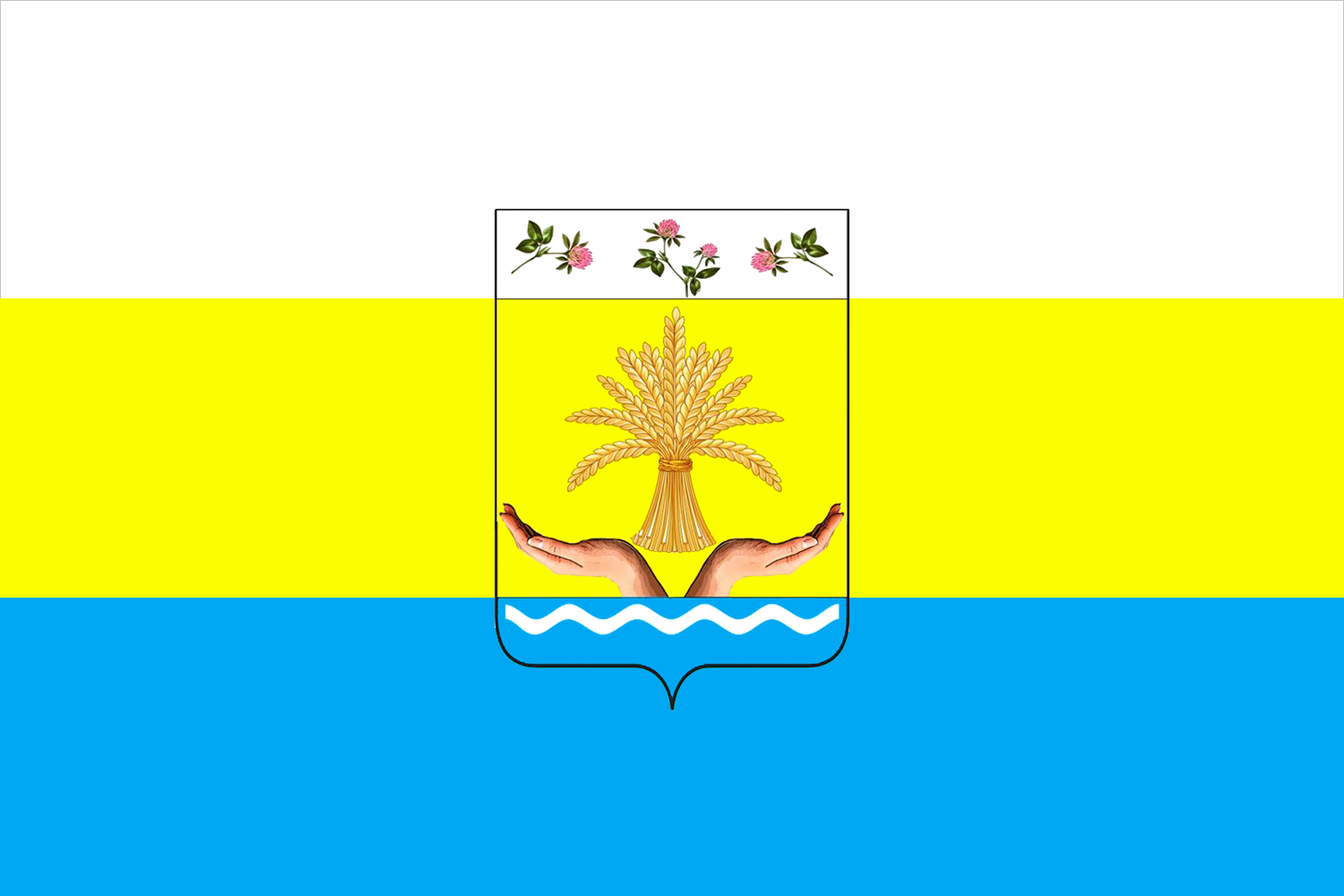
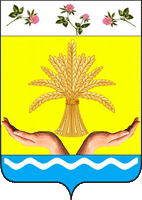
- Flag Coat of arms
- Location of Tarumovsky District in the Republic of Dagestan
- Coordinates: 44°04′N 46°32′E
- Country: Russia
- Federal subject: Republic of Dagestan
- Established: 1946
- Administrative center: Tarumovka

Area
  - Total: 3,020 km^{2} (1,170 sq mi)

Population (2010 Census)
  - Total: 31,683
  - Density: 10.5/km^{2} (27.2/sq mi)
  - Urban: 0%
  - Rural: 100%

Administrative structure
  - Administrative divisions: 5 Selsoviets
  - Inhabited localities: 23 rural localities

Municipal structure
  - Municipally incorporated as: Tarumovsky Municipal District
  - Municipal divisions: 0 urban settlements, 13 rural settlements
- Time zone: UTC+3 (MSK)
- OKTMO ID: 82649000
- Website: http://www.tarumovka.ru

Population of Tarumovsky District
- 2010 Census: 31,683
- 2002 Census: 28,587
- 1989 Census: 30,854
- 1979 Census: 26,542

Tarumovsky District (Russian: Тару́мовский райо́н) is an administrative and municipal district (raion), one of the forty-one in the Republic of Dagestan, Russia. It is located in the north of the republic. The area of the district is 3,020 square kilometers (1,170 sq mi). Its administrative center is the rural locality (a selo) of Tarumovka. As of the 2010 Census, the total population of the district was 31,683, with the population of Tarumovka accounting for 17.0% of that number.

== Administrative and municipal status ==
Within the framework of administrative divisions, Tarumovsky District is one of the forty-one in the Republic of Dagestan. The district is divided into five selsoviets which comprise twenty-three rural localities. As a municipal division, the district is incorporated as Tarumovsky Municipal District. Its five selsoviets are incorporated as thirteen rural settlements within the municipal district. The selo of Tarumovka serves as the administrative center of both the administrative and municipal district.
