= Tarumovka, Republic of Dagestan =

Rural locality in Dagestan, Russia

Coordinates: 44°04′29″N 46°32′21″E

Tarumovka (Russian: Тарумовка, Avar: Тарумовка) is a rural locality (a selo) and the administrative center of Tarumovsky District of the Republic of Dagestan, Russia. Population: 5,372 (2010 census); 4,899 (2002 census); 4,326 (1989 Soviet census).
