= Eghiazar =

- Catholicos of Albania, Lupenia and Chola
- Church: Caucasian Albanian Church
- Installed: 680
- Term ended: 688
- Predecessor: Ukhtanes
- Successor: Nerses Bakur

Personal details
- Died: 688

Eghiazar (Old Armenian: Եղիազար, romanized: Ełiazar) was the Catholicos and head of Caucasian Albanian Church in the late 7th century.

== Election ==
Attested in The History of the Country of Albania, he was mentioned as a bishop of Shaki during tenure of his predecessor Ukhtanes. Although Mkhitar Gosh and Kirakos Gandzaketsi give his tenure for 6 years and death date as 688, thus suggesting his election in 682, Dowsett argued against this, suggesting early 680 instead.

== Tenure ==
His tenure started during reign of Javanshir as a vassal of Umayyad Caliphate, a period of relative political stability but also arrival of Muslims in Albania. Certain Albanian noble families were beginning to forge intermarriage bonds with Muslim nobles. He was described by Movses Kalankatuatsi as an equal to apostles 'in word and deed' and was active in evangelizing North Caucasian Huns, sending Israel to work among them. After Javanshir's death and succession of Varaz-Tiridates I, he was instrumental in forging peace between Alp Iluetuer and Varaz. He died in 688 and succeeded by Nerses Bakur.

== Establishing St.Elisaeus cult ==
Eghiazar is considered by some Armenian researchers as the initiator of St.Elisæus of Albania legend. According to this theory, Eghiazar boosted the cult of Elisaeus in order to put forward the claim that Albanian Church was independent of Armenian Church. As such, Eghiazar promoted Giš (near his bishopric in Shaki) and connected it with Elisaeus as well. This claim put establishment of Albanian Christianity way before activities of Gregory the Enlightener.

== Sources ==
- Dasxuranci, Movses (1961). The History of the Caucasian Albanians. Translated by Dowsett, Charles. London: Oxford University Press.
