= Nerses Bakur =

Catholicos and head of Caucasian Albanian Church

- Catholicos of Albania, Lupenia and Chola
- Church: Caucasian Albanian Church
- Installed: 688
- Term ended: 704
- Predecessor: Eghiazar
- Successor: Simeon of Albania

Personal details
- Died: 704 Damascus
- Denomination: Chalcedonian Christianity

Nerses Bakur (Old Armenian: Ներսես Բակուր, romanized: Nersēs Bakur) was the Catholicos and head of Caucasian Albanian Church in the late 7th and early 8th century.

== Election ==
Attested in The History of the Country of Albania, he was mentioned as a bishop of Gardman during the tenure of his predecessor Eghiazar. Reportedly he was elected after the influence and intervention of Queen Spram, wife of Varaz-Tiridates I.

== Tenure ==
A long proponent of Chalcedonian Christianity, the clique wanted to achieve political and religious independence of Albania through alliance with Byzantine Empire. However, he didn't proclaim it openly until 702. As part of reforms, he appointed his Chalcedonian ally Zakʿaria as bishop of Greater Arran bishopric (Old Armenian: Մեծ Առանք, romanized: Mec Aṙankʿ), succeeding previous Miaphysite bishop Yovēl. He also dismissed Israel (now bishop of Greater Kolmank) and Eghiazar – bishop of Gardman, Nerses' former seat. Rival clique was led by Sheroy – regent of Albania, as well as Yovhannēs (bishop of Qabala), Sahak (bishop of Amaras).

== Deposition ==
Nerses' reforms in church alarmed Elias I (703–717), the Armenian Catholicos to intervene and apply to Caliph Abd-al-Malik. Elias accused Nerses and Spram of swearing alliance to Byzantines and plotting against the Umayyad Caliphate.Nerses and Spram were caught by Sheroy exiled to Damascus where he died. His books were pillaged from his summer residence in Berdakor and was thrown into Tartar river.He was succeeded by Simeon who was installed by Elias. After Nerses' death, Caucasian Albanian Church became a subject of Armenian Apostolic Church.

== Sources ==
- Dasxuranci, Movses (1961). The History of the Caucasian Albanians. Translated by Dowsett, Charles. London: Oxford University Press.
