= Abas (Catholicos) =

Head of Caucasian Albanian Church in the late 6th century

- Catholicos of Albania, Lupenia and Chola
- Church: Caucasian Albanian Church
- Installed: 552
- Term ended: 596
- Predecessor: Shuphalishoy (?)
- Successor: Viro

Personal details
- Died: 596
- Denomination: Chalcedonian Christianity or Monophysitism

Abas (Old Armenian: Աբաս) or Tēr Abas was the Catholicos and head of Caucasian Albanian Church in the late 6th century. He is considered as first autocephalous catholicos of Albania, by the virtue of adoption of his full official insulatio as Catholicos of Albania, Lupenia and Chola. However, previous catholicoi were also mentioned in other sources.

== Tenure ==
According to The History of the Country of Albania, prior to his election as catholicos, he was leading Greater Arran bishopric (Old Armenian: Մեծ Առանք, romanized: Mec Aṙankʿ). While Kaghankatvatsi describes his tenure as 44 years starting from establishment of Armenian calendar (that is 552–596 in Gregorian calendar), Mkhitar Gosh offers 23 years (552-575), with Kirakos Gandzaketsi offering as little as 14 years (552-566).

== Activities ==
His tenure saw the transfer of patriarchal see of Albania from Chola to Partav. He was also indirectly mentioned with restoration of Katarovank which was in ruins since days of Sanesan. According to a colophon, he recovered some relics of St. Grigoris, St. Stephen, St. Varus, Mammes of Caesarea, Mar Sargis, Saints Cosmas and Damian, some of Forty Martyrs of Sebaste and Theodosius of Jerusalem in 559, latter of them being strongly anti-Chalcedonian in nature.

Church of Caucasian Albania was a struggle ground between Orthodox and Monophysite views in 6th century. Abas received two letters from top religious heads of its time - Hovhannes II (557 – 574), Catholicos of Armenia and John IV (575 - 594), Patriarch of Jerusalem, both urging Abas to come to their side. Despite posed as staunch anti-Chalcedonian in The History of the Country of Albania, some scholars consider his monophysitism a later addition to sources. Jasmine Dum-Tragut supports the view that he was Chalcedonian.
