= Viro (Catholicos) =

- Catholicos of Albania, Lupenia and Chola
- Church: Caucasian Albanian Church
- Installed: 596
- Term ended: 630
- Predecessor: Abas
- Successor: Zachary II

Personal details
- Died: 630
- Denomination: Chalcedonian Christianity or Monophysitism

Viro or Viroy (Old Armenian: Վիրոյ, fl. 596 – c. 630) was the Catholicos and head of Caucasian Albanian Church in the early 7th century. His full official title was Catholicos of Albania, Lupenia and Chola.

== Life in Sassanid court ==
He succeeded Ter Abas as head of Caucasian Albanian Church in 596. Nothing is known about him prior to his tenure as catholicos. He was residing in Paytakaran during early reign of Khosrow II according to Stepanos Asoghik. According to The History of the Country of Albania he fled to Sassanid court c. 603 after an ill-fated rebellion by Albanian nobles. While Marie Brosset links this to Khosrow's attack on Byzantine Empire during Byzantine–Sasanian War of 602–628, Dowsett finds this unconvincing. He was described as a learned theologian and skillful diplomat, succeeding at learning Middle Persian and enjoying the patronage of Queen Shirin. His position as catholicos was kept secure by the guarantee of Khosrow himself. He was released from the house arrest in Ctesiphon thanks to Kavad II in 628.

== Life after release ==
He arrived in Albania during the height of the Third Perso-Turkic war. While the Sasanian marzban fled before the Göktürks, Viroy tried to stall their advance. However, tired of waiting, Turkic envoys invaded Albania. Viro and a noble called Gad Všnasp (Constantin Zuckerman equates him to Varaz Grigor) fled to Artsakh, then a province of Albania. However, Turkic army caught up and forced the catholicos and nobles of Albania to subdue. Viroy and his delegation visited Böri's encampment near Partav. Viroy submitted and obtained peace, returning enslaved Albanians back.

After Heraclius' entrance to Albania in 628, he baptized and then consecrated Varaz Grigor as king, serving alongside him as catholicos. He was characterised by Mkhitar Gosh as 'a holy man resplented with virtue'. Viro witnessed Plague of Sheroe surging in Albania and wrote detailed account of it, himself probably dying from the plague in 630.

== Theological view ==
Viroy was described as Chalcedonian by Zaza Aleksidze, who claims Khosrow demanded of him to anathematise the Council of Chalcedon. However, Toumanoff maintains the idea that Viroy was monophysite and Heraclius was not able to reconvert him. Aleksan Hakobyan also supports this version. James Howard-Johnston concluded however that, Viroy's life was written much later after his life and the authors did not want to acknowledge the awkward fact of him being Chalcedonian in light of the deeds done by him for fellow countrymen. Armenian authors Sebeos and Stepanos Taronetsi regarded him as Chalcedonian as well.
