= Pre-Abrahamic religions of Azerbaijan =

Very little is known about pre-Christian and pre-Islamic mythology in Eastern Transcaucasia; sources are mostly Hellenic historians like Strabo and archaeological evidence.

== Caucasian Albanian paganism ==
=== Dualism ===
==== Barhail ====
Barhail is one of the two major Pre-Abrahamic gods. He keeps the sun on his right hand and the moon on his left hand. His right hand points East and left hand points West. If he allows his right hand to drop for too long, the world will fall under darkness forever. He decides if days should be longer or shorter.

==== Sabail ====
Sabail is the other major Pre-Abrahamic god. He is the protector of the sea and wind. He stands perpendicular to Barhail. His left hand prevents floods and separates the oceans from the continents. His right hand keeps the weather calm. If he drops that hand, typhoons and storms can occur.

=== Sun, moon and sky ===
Strabo names the gods of the sun, the sky, and above all, the moon, and equates them to the Greek gods Helios, Zeus, and Selene, respectively:

As for gods, they honour Helius, Zeus, and Selene, but especially Selene; her temple is near Iberia. The office of priest is held by the man who, after the king, is held in highest honour; he has charge of the sacred land, which is extensive and well-populated, and also of the temple slaves, many of whom are subject to religious frenzy and utter prophecies.

=== Sacrifice ===
According to Strabo, human sacrifice was widely used in pre-Christian Albania:

And any one of those who, becoming violently possessed, wanders alone in the forests, is by the priest arrested, bound with sacred fetters, and sumptuously maintained during that year, and then led forth to the sacrifice that is performed in honour of the goddess, and, being anointed, is sacrificed along with other victims. The sacrifice is performed as follows: Some person holding a sacred lance, with which it is the custom to sacrifice human victims, comes forward out of the crowd and strikes the victim through the side into the heart, he being not without experience in such a task; and when the victim falls, they draw auguries from his fall and declare them before the public; and when the body is carried to a certain place, they all trample upon it, thus using it as a means of purification.

=== Ancestor worship ===
Unlike many pagan nations, Caucasian Albanians did not practice ancestor worship. As Strabo states:

The Albanians are surpassingly respectful to old age, not merely to their parents, but to all other old people. And when people die it is impious to be concerned about them or even to mention them. Indeed, they bury their money with them, and therefore live in poverty, having no patrimony.

=== Sacred islands ===
In East Albania, sacred lands existed in the islands of the Caspian Sea. Pomponius Mela wrote:

Talge [Cheleken], on the Caspian Sea, is fertile without being cultivated and is abundant in every root crop and fruit, but the local peoples consider it an abomination and a sacrilege to touch what grows there. They think that these things have been prepared by the gods and must be saved for the gods. Alongside those coasts that we have called deserted lie some equally deserted islands, which, being without names of their own, are called the Scythian Islands

=== Temples ===
Almost every pagan temple has been replaced by churches. Notable temples were:

- Kilsedagh church - was a temple dedicated to Mithra and paintings of Mithra can still be seen inside.
- Anahit church - was a temple dedicated to the Armenian goddess Anahit.
- Chaparly church - archeological excavations proved that there were pagan temples here. In a burial site, a human skeleton was discovered which contained his/her own customs, which is unusual to Christian practice.
- Kurmuk church - a church built on an old pagan temple during the Russian invasion of İlisu.
- Lakit church - church built on an old pagan temple.
- Mamrukh church - church built on temples dedicated to the Sun and Moon.
- Mingachevir Church Complex - church complex built on a fire temple. It is mostly ruined, but pagan symbols still exist. One of them is a World tree between two peafowl engravings.

=== Archeological evidence ===
Enormous statues were found in archeological sites of Khinisly (near the village of Böyük Xınıslı), Chiraghly and Daghkolany. They were made using local stones. Most are missing their heads and hands and are roughly human height. They were made in the final centuries BC.

== Zoroastrianism ==
Zoroastrianism in Azerbaijan goes back to the first millennium BC or earlier and was the predominant religion of the region before the conversion to Islam.

== Hun paganism ==
Huns migrated to the Caucasus in 6th century AD. They established a polity here. Bishop Israel wrote about the customs of the Huns and their deities:

- Kuara - the god of thunder.
- Aspandiat - an old Hun hero that was deified.
- Fire, Water, an unnamed goddess of roads.

== Christianization and Islamization ==
=== Cruxifiction of St. Bartholomeus ===
According to a legend, Bartholomeus came to a place on the shore of the Caspian Sea which is likely to be Baku, cured the daughter of the local king, Polymius, of her madness, and was subsequently granted the right to preach freely in his territory by the king. The Apostolic Acts of Abdias tell that locals worshipped a goddess by the name of Astaroth. In a competition with the local priesthood, Bartholomeus assembled a large crowd in front of an image of the goddess and challenged the deity to show itself. Instead, the statue shattered and an angel appeared. The angel revealed the exorcised demon-deity to the crowd. The goddess, totally black, "sharp faced", and breathing fire and brimstone, was bound in chains by the angel and sent away. The king, amazed at what he had just seen, was immediately baptized along with many of his subjects. The king's brother, Astyages, heard of the baptisms and declared war on the Christian community. Bartholomeus was beaten with clubs, skinned alive and then finally beheaded in front of Maiden Tower.

=== Persecution of pagans ===
==== Christian persecution of pagans ====
According to Movses Kaghanvatsi, Vachagan III the Pious of Albania persecuted pagan priests, tortured and forcibly converted them to Christianity. He established a Church School in a city called Rustak and raised children of pagan couples as Christians.

==== Islamic treatment of pagans ====
Not much information exists about pagans living during the Islamization process of Azerbaijan, because they were converted or executed before the arrival of Islam. According to Azerbaijani historian Sara Ashurbeyli, several Shahs of Shirvan fought against nonmuslims. But it's likely to be the country of Sarir. Estakhri states that pagans still existed during the 10th century. Andalusian traveler Abu Hamid al-Qarnati states that pagans were living in mountainous villages near the city of Derbent in the 12th century.

== Tengrism ==
The Mongol invasion can be considered a second wave of paganism in Azerbaijan, but after Ghazan adopted Islam as the state religion, paganism and shamanism quickly dissolved.

== Azeri folk religion ==
Paganism greatly influenced Azeri folklore. Supernatural beings (giants, div, fairies, dwarves) from fairy tales, religious rituals, and sacred shrines (pir) play important roles in modern Azerbaijan. Azeri metal bands like Vozmezdie and Üör usually refer to paganism in their works.

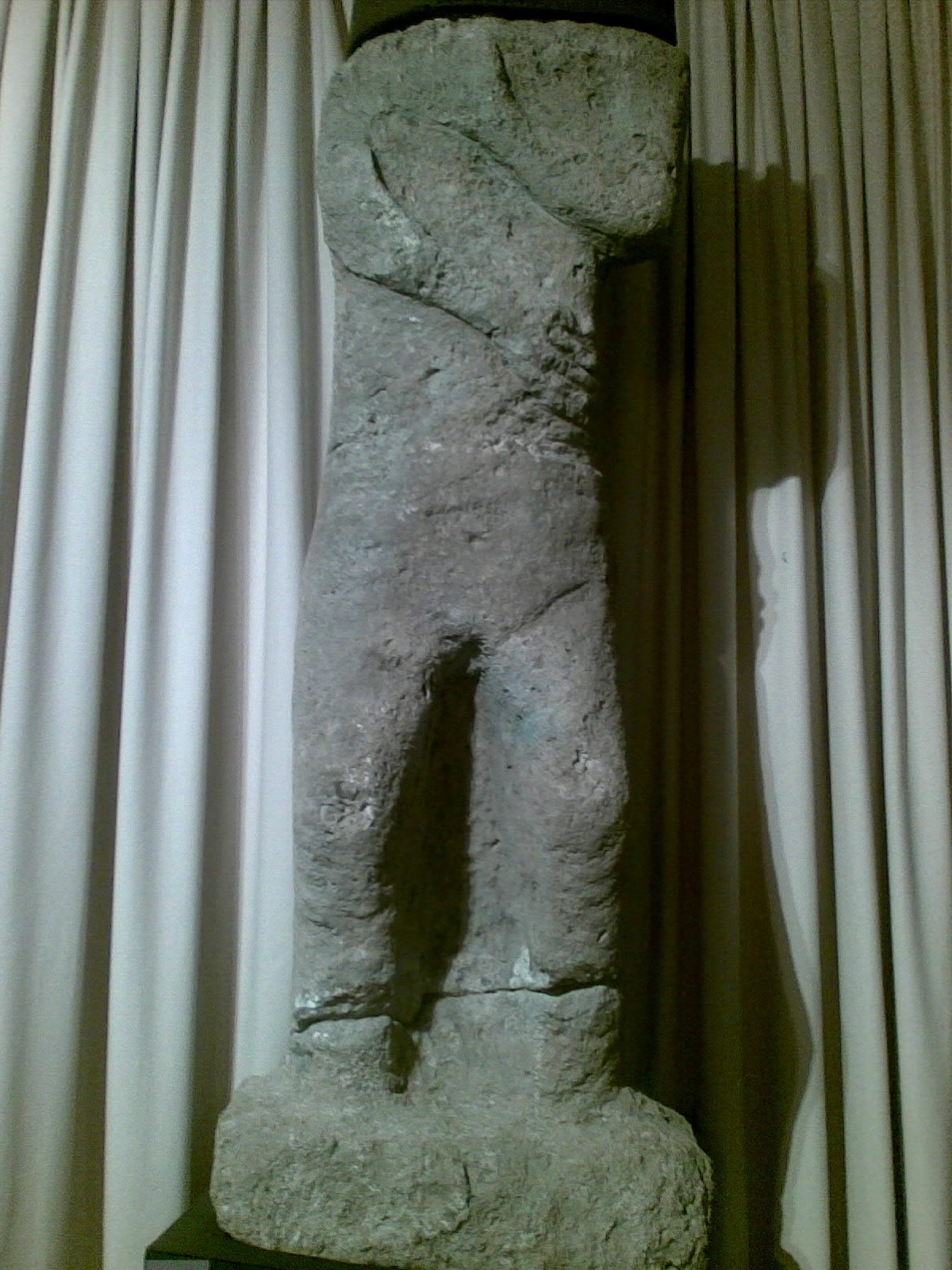
A goddess statue

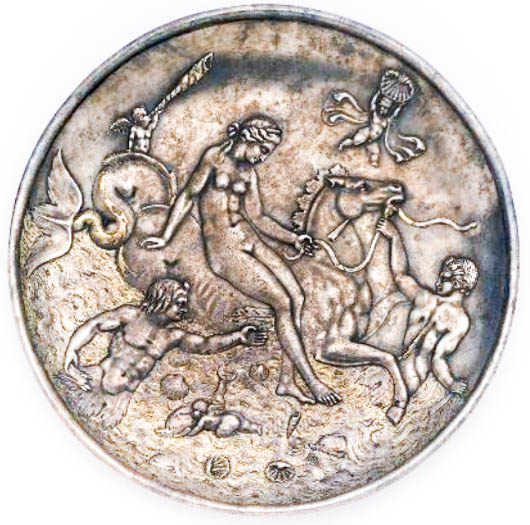
Water fairies engraved on a plate

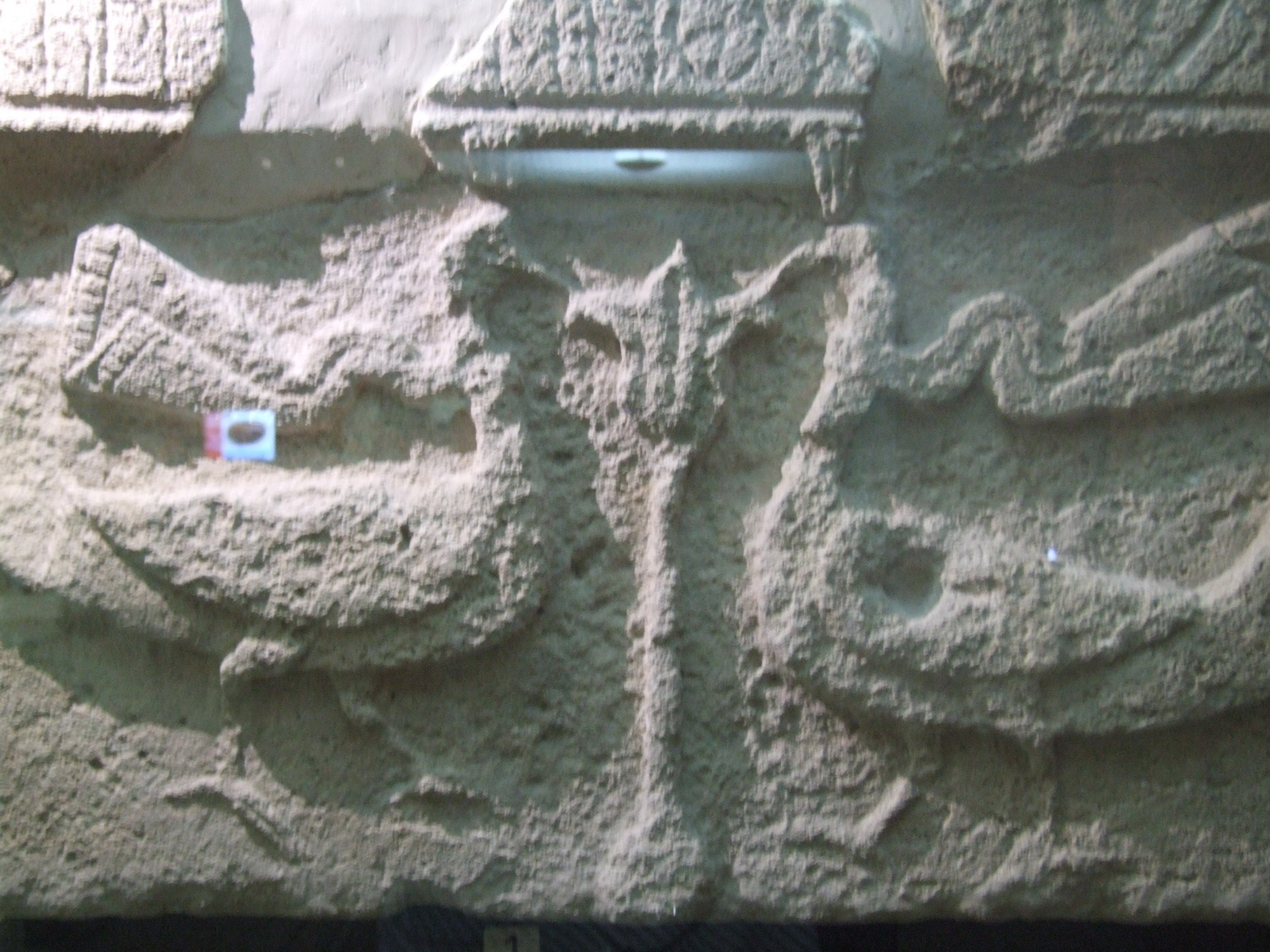
A pagan engraving

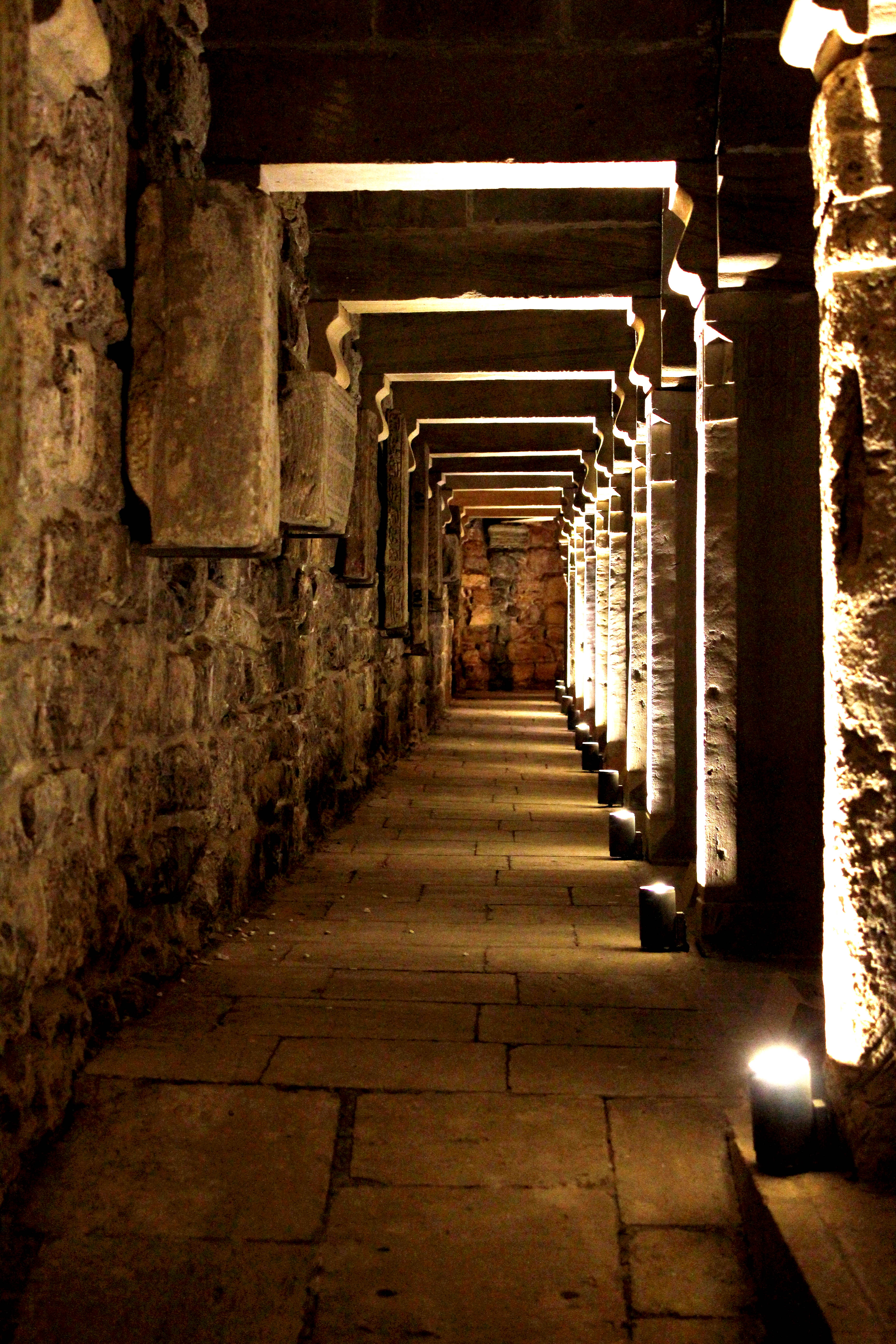
A pagan temple in Baku

=== Sacred mountains ===
Like Greek, Chinese and Tengrist practices, local inhabitants considered several mountains to be sacred. This is the list of sacred mountains according to local legends:

- Babadağ is the fourth highest peak in the Caucasus in Azerbaijan at 3,629 meters. It is located north of İsmayıllı. At the top is a pir dedicated to Hasrat Baba—a person revered as a holy man—who is believed to have lived during the period when the area was known as Caucasian Albania. Babadağ means "Grandfather Mountain".
- Mount Avey is one of the peaks and a whitish-gray ridge in the Small Caucasus Mountains located between Georgia and the Gazakh district. It is 12 km away from the village of Dash Salahli. Avey means "House of the Moon".
- Mount Goyazan is a mountain in northwestern Qazakh Rayon of Azerbaijan. Goyazan means "Skycrusher". According to ancient local beliefs, it was named because of its loneliness and it facing toward the sky.
- Khinalug is a mountain where Khinalug people live. Before Islam, they were pagan, worshiping "their own fire god".
