= Lupenians =

Historical tribe in what is now Azerbaijan

The Lupenians (Old Armenian: Լփինք, romanized: Lpʿinkʿ, (Note: Called the Lifénnioi (Ancient Greek: Λιφέννιοι) in the Greek version of Agathangelos and Lifiniyun in the Arabic version.) Latin: Lupenii) or Lpins were a historical tribe that lived in modern-day Republic of Azerbaijan in antiquity. The Lupenians were mentioned in several sources in different languages. They are equated with Pliny's Lupenii, dwelling south of the tribe of Silvii (Chola), just next to the Diduri and near the frontier of Caucasian Albania. They had a main settlement or city which is only known by the foreign names Lp’nats’ k’aghak’ ('[capital] city of the Lupenians' in Armenian) and Loubion Kōmē ('Loubion village' in Greek). The Ravenna Cosmography mentions their land as "Patria Lepon" situated next to Iberia and the Caspian Sea. The Tabula Peutingeriana also mentions the Lupenii. Vladimir Minorsky proposed later Arabic versions as well. They were probably related to the Caucasian Albanians and have been suggested as one of the 26 constitutive groups of the Caucasian Albanian kingdom.

== Location ==
Scholars Suren Yeremian and Tengiz Papuashvili proposed Iberia, especially the coast of the Alazan river, as a possible dwelling location of the Lupenians. However, Robert Hewsen opposed the idea and suggested their location as near modern Shamakhi, Azerbaijan, instead. The Lupenians were visited by Bishop Israel, Albanian emissary to the North Caucasian Huns. The History of the Country of Albania mentions them as people professing the Christian faith. Likewise, at least two catholicoi of the Caucasian Albanian Church—Ter Abas and Viro—were titled Catholicos of Albania, Lupenia and Chola, hinting at the faith of three neighboring regions. Russian historian Igor Semenov put their location near Layzan. Most recently, Murtazali Gadjiev proposed the Shakki region (Georgian Hereti) as the location of the Lupenians.

== Society ==
The tribe was headed by a chief, whose title is indirectly mentioned by Ibn Khordadbeh as Lbinshāh. This was a title used by the Sasanian king Khosrow I to honor the ruler of the Lupenians.
