= List of Caucasian Albanian catholicoi =

This is a list of the Caucasian Albanian Primates and Catholicoi of the Church of Caucasian Albania.

Note that the lineage and dates slightly vary from source to source. Some dates are unclear. Armenian language equivalents are provided at the end of each line.

The initial list is from the Caucasian Albanian Chronicle of Mkhitar Gosh and further additions after his death:

== Apostolic primates ==
- St Elisæus the Apostle also known as Yeghishe (died c. 79) -- Եղիշե
  - Unknown

== Historic catholicoi / primates ==
=== Catolicoi primates appointed by Armenian Apostolic Church (fourth century – c. 590) ===
- St. Grigoris (314–343) (grandson of Gregory the Illuminator) – Սուրբ Գրիգորիս
- Matte (consecrated c. 343) – Մատթե
- Sahak I (unknown dates) – Սահակ Ա
- Karen (unknown dates) – Կարեն
- Pand (unknown dates)
- Ghazar (unknown dates) – Ղազար
- Zakarea I (consecrated in Chogh) – Զաքարյա Ա
- Davit I (c. 399) – Դավիթ Ա
- St Yohan (Hovhan I) (c. 400) – Սուրբ Հովհաննես (Հովհաննես Ա)
- Yeremeay (c. 423) – Երեմիա
  - Unknown
- St Shupkhalishoy (c. 500 – c. 551)
- Abas (552–596) (consecrated in Partav) – Աբաս

=== Autocephaly (590–705) ===
The following is a list of Caucasian Albanian Catholicoi obtained from the Caucasian Albanian Chronicle of Mkhitar Gosh: and further additions.

- Abas (continues until 596) after autocephaly declared in 590 during his reign – Աբաս
- Viroy (596–630) – Վիրո
- Zakarea II (630–646) – Զաքարիա Բ
- Hovhannes II (646–671) – Հովհան Բ
- Ukhtanes (671–683) – Ուխտանես
- Eghiazar (683–689) – Եղիազար
- Nerses I (689–706) (overthrown as he became an advocate of the Chalcedonian doctrines) – Ներսես Ա

=== Catholicoi ordained through the Catholicos Patriarch of Armenia (705 – c. 1058) ===
- Simeon I (706–707) – Սիմեոն Ա
- Mikayel (707–744) – Միքայել
- Anastas I (744–748) Անաստաս Ա
- Yusep (Hovsep) I (748–765) – Հովսեփ Ա
- Davit II (765–769) – Դավիթ Բ
- Davit III (769–778) – Դավիթ Գ
- Matte (778–779) – Մատթե
- Movses I (779–781) – Մովսես Ա
- Aharon (781–784) – Ահարոն
- Soghomon I (784) – Սողոմոն Ա
- Teodoros (784–788) – Թեոդորոս
- Soghomon II (788–789) – Սողոմոն Բ
- Hovhannes III (799–824) – Հովհաննես Գ
- Movses II (824) – Մովսես Բ
- Davit IV (824–852) – Դավիթ Դ
- Hovsep II (852–877) – Հովսեփ Բ
- Samuel (877–894) – Սամուել
- Hovnan (Hovhannes IV) (894–902) – Հովնան (Հովհաննես Դ)
- Simeon II (902–923) – Սիմեոն Բ
- Davit V (923–929) – Դավիթ Ե
- Sahak (929–947) – Սահակ
- Gagik (947–958) – Գագիկ
- Davit VI (958–965) – Դավիթ Զ
- Davit VII (965–971) – Դավիթ Է
- Petros I (971–987) – Պետրոս Ա
- Movses III (987–993) – Մովսես Գ
- Markos I (consecrated c. 993) – Մարկոս Ա
- Hovsep III (unknown dates) – Հովսեփ Գ
- Markos II (unknown dates) – Մարկոս Բ

=== Autocephaly re-established (c. 1058 – c. 1434) ===
The Catholicosate of the Church of Armenia moved to Cilicia and the Holy See of Cilicia was established in 1058.

- Stepanos I (d. 1079) – Ստեփանոս Ա
- Hovhannes V (1079–1121) – Հովհաննես Ե
  - vacant (1121–1129)
- Stepanos II (c. 1129 – c. 1131) – Ստեփանոս Բ
- Gagik II (Grigoris I) (d. c. 1139) – Գագիկ Բ (Գրիգորիս Ա) (nephew of Stepanos, consecrated at the fortress of Tavush)
- Bezhken (c. 1140) – Բեժգեն
- Nerses II (1149–1155) – Ներսես Բ
- Stepanos III (1155–1195) – Ստեփանոս Գ
- Hovhannes VI (1195–1235) – Հովհաննես Զ
- Nerses III (1235–1262) – Ներսես Գ
- Stepanos IV (1262 – c. 1323) – Ստեփանոս Դ
- Soukias (consecrated 1323) – Սուքիաս
- Petros II (d. c. 1331) – Պետրոս Բ
- Zakarea II (c. 1331) – Զաքարիա Բ
- Davit VIII (??) – Դավիթ Ը
  - Unknown (c. 1331 – c. 1401)
- Karapet (1402–1420) – Կարապետ
- Hovhannes VII (c. 1426–1428) – Հովհաննես Է
- Matheos I (c. 1434) – Մատթեոս Ա

=== Under the jurisdiction of the Armenian Apostolic Church (1441–1828) ===
The Catholicosate of the Church of Armenia was re-established at the Mother See of Holy Etchmiadzin in 1441.

- Athanas (c. 1441) – Աթանաս
- Grigor II (unknown dates) – Գրիգոր Բ
- Hovhannes VIII (c. 1470) – Հովհաննես Ը
- Azaria (unknown dates) – Ազարիա
- Thomas (c. 1471) – Թովմաս
- Aristakes I (unknown dates) – Արիստակես Ա
- Stepanos V (c. 1476) – Ստեփանոս Ե
- Nerses IV (c. 1478) – Ներսես Դ
- Shmavon I (c. 1481) – Շմավոն Ա
- Aragel (1481–1497) – Առաքել
- Matheos II (c. 1488) – Մատթեոս Բ
  - Unknown (c. 1488 – 1515)
- Aristakes II (1515 – c. 1516) – Արիստակես Բ
  - Unknown (c. 1516 – c. 1554)
- Sargis I (c. 1554) – Սարգիս Ա Ղշլաղեցի
- Grigor III (1559–1574) – Գրիգոր Գ
- Petros II (1571) – Պետրոս Բ
- Davit IX (c. 1573) – Դավիթ Թ
- Pilibbos Toumetsi (c. 1574) – Փիլիփոս Տումեցի
- Hovhannes IX (1574–1584) – Հովհաննես Թ
- Davit IX (c. 1584) – Դավիթ Թ
- Anastas II (c. 1585) – Անաստաս Բ
- Shmavon II (1586–1611) – Շմավոն Բ
- ArIstakes III Goladagetsi (c. 1588) – Արիստակես Գ Քոլատակեցի
- Melikset Arashetsi (c. 1593) – Մելիքսեթ Արաշեցի
- Simeon III (c. 1616) – Սիմեոն Գ
  - Unknown
- Petros II Khantsgetsi (1653–1675) – Պետրոս Բ Խանձկեցի
- Yeremia Hasan-Jalalyan (1676–1700) – Երեմիա Հասան-Ջալալյան
- Yesay Hasan-Jalalyan (1702–1728) – Եսայի Հասան-Ջալալյան
  - Nerses V (anti-catholicos) (1706–1736) – Ներսես Ե (հակաթոռ)
- Israel (1728–1763) – Իսրայել
- Hovhannes X Gantsasaretsi (1763–1786) – Հովհաննես Ժ Գանձասարեցի
- Sargis II Gantsasaretsi (1810–1815) – Սարգիս Բ Գանձասարեցի
  - Sargis continued serving as metropolitan until 1828
- Post abolished (1828–1836)
