= Shuphalishoy =

- Archbishop of Partav
- Church: Caucasian Albanian Church

Personal details
- Denomination: Chalcedonian Christianity or Monophysitism

Shuphalishoy (Old Armenian: Շուփհաղիշոյ, romanized: Šupʿhałišoy) or Saint Shuphalishoy was a 5th-6th-century archbishop of Partav, then capital of Caucasian Albania.

== Background ==
Shuphalishoy was mentioned in The History of the Caucasian Albanians on a document on the church council of Ałuen in 498, as archbishop of Partav, after Vachagan III. In addition, in 506, he was mentioned as part of a delegation of Albanian clergy who took part in the Armenian-Albanian-Iberian church meeting convened by the Armenian Catholicos Babken I (490-515) in Dvin. He was also mentioned as senior chief bishop of Vachagan.

== Identity ==
His name (Classical Syriac: ܫܘܒܚܐܠܝܫܘܥ, romanized: Šūḇḥālīšōʿ, lit. 'Glory of Jesus') suggests Syriac ethnic origins, while he was also mentioned to be from Jerusalem. In one of the manuscripts of The History of the Caucasian Albanians he was mentioned directly as Grigoris' successor to catholicosate, however in other manuscripts, he is among 5 patriarchs who preceded Grigoris and succeeded Eliseus of Albania. He was also described as successor of Eliseus by Mkhitar Gosh. 13th-century author Kirakos Gandzaketsi also expressed his confusion over his identity. 18th-century religious leader Simeon I of Yerevan considered his inclusion in patriarchal list a later addition by Caucasian Albanian monks to promote autocephaly of Caucasian Albanian Church.
