= Ambazuces =

Hunnic ruler in the North Caucasus

Ambazuces (Greek: Ἀμβαζούκης, romanized: Ambazoukes) was a "Hunnic" ruler in the North Caucasus in the early 6th century, probably of the Sabirs.

According to the Byzantine historian Procopius, Ambazuces ruled the area of the "Caspian Gates"—most likely referring to the Darial Pass—during the reign of the Byzantine emperor Anastasius I (r. 491–518). Procopius reports that he was friendly towards Byzantium, and in his old age offered to cede his realm, but Anastasius declined. This was probably during or shortly after the Anastasian War of 502–506 between Byzantium and Sassanid Persia.

After his death, he was succeeded by his sons, who were defeated by the Persian king Kavadh I (r. 488–531), who annexed their territory to Persia.

== Sources ==
- Greatrex, Geoffrey (1998). Rome and Persia at War, 502-532. Francis Cairns. ISBN 9780905205939.
- Martindale, John R., ed. (1980). The Prosopography of the Later Roman Empire: Volume II, AD 395–527. Cambridge: Cambridge University Press. ISBN 0-521-20159-4.
