= Church of Kish =

Georgian Orthodox church in Azerbaijan

- Church of Saint Elishe; Müq. Yelisey Kilsəsi; Holy Mother of God Church; Tanrının Müqəddəs anası Kilsəsi; Սուրբ Աստուածածին եկեղեցի გიშის ღვთისმშობლის ეკლესია
- Church of Kish in 2026

- Location within Azerbaijan

Religion
- Affiliation: Georgian Orthodox Church
- Ecclesiastical or organisational status: inactive (no parishioners), but mass held by Georgian priest

Location
- Location: Kiş, Shaki, Azerbaijan
- Coordinates: 41.248933°N 47.193067°E

Architecture
- Completed: probably early 12th century AD
- Dome: 1

The Church of Kish (Azerbaijani: Kiş kilsəsi; Georgian: გიშის ეკლესია), also known from different sources as Church of Saint Elishe (Azerbaijani: Müqəddəs Yelisey kilsəsi; Armenian: Սուրբ Եղիշէ եկեղեցի; Latinised Saint Eliseus) or Holy Mother of God Church (Armenian: Սուրբ Աստուածածին եկեղեցի), is a Georgian Orthodox church, probably dating to the early 12th century, in the village of Kiş, approximately 5 km north of Shaki, Azerbaijan. It has been inactive due to lack of parishioners since the 19th century, although mass was still regularly held as of 2000 by a Georgian priest. Archaeological research undertaken in 2000 concluded that it was first built as a diophysite Georgian church, later to become a Chalcedonian church (Armenian or Caucasian Albanian). Previous research had proposed that it had functioned at different times as a Caucasian Albanian Apostolic church, a Chalcedonian church within the Georgian Orthodox Church, and later as an Armenian Apostolic Church.

== History ==
According to the 7th century Armenian historian Movses Kaghankatvatsi, in the 1st century AD St. Elishe, a disciple of Thaddeus of Edessa, arrived to a place called Gis (Գիս), where he built a church and recited a liturgy. The church became the "spiritual center and the place of enlightenment of people of the East". On his way from Gis St. Elishe was killed near the pagan altar in the small Zerguni valley by unknown people. According to the Armenian historian on architecture Samvel Karapetian, the geographical position of Kish does not seem to match that described by Kaghankatvatsi. Karapetian believes that they have identified Gis as the village of Bomen/Bum 60 km to the south-east of Kish, in Gabala district.

According to a Georgian historiographer, in the 10th century, the population of Kish converted to the Georgian Orthodox Church (Chalcedonism). The church of Kish was turned into a residence of a Georgian bishop, functioning till 17th century. By the time when Russia took possession of the region the village of Kish had Udi population. According to Robert H. Hewsen, the Udi language appeared to have been prevalent north of Kura River until the nineteenth century, and the Armenian population appeared to be of relatively recent arrival. While many Armenians undoubtedly settled there fleeing the Turko-Mongolic invasions, many more entered the region with the coming of the Russians in the early nineteenth century.

According to Vladimir Minorsky, Kish was conquered by David the Builder in 1117 and was given to eristavi of Tsuketi and became seat for the bishop of Eliseni (Elisu), Tsuketi and Shakihi (Shaki).

== Research and dating ==
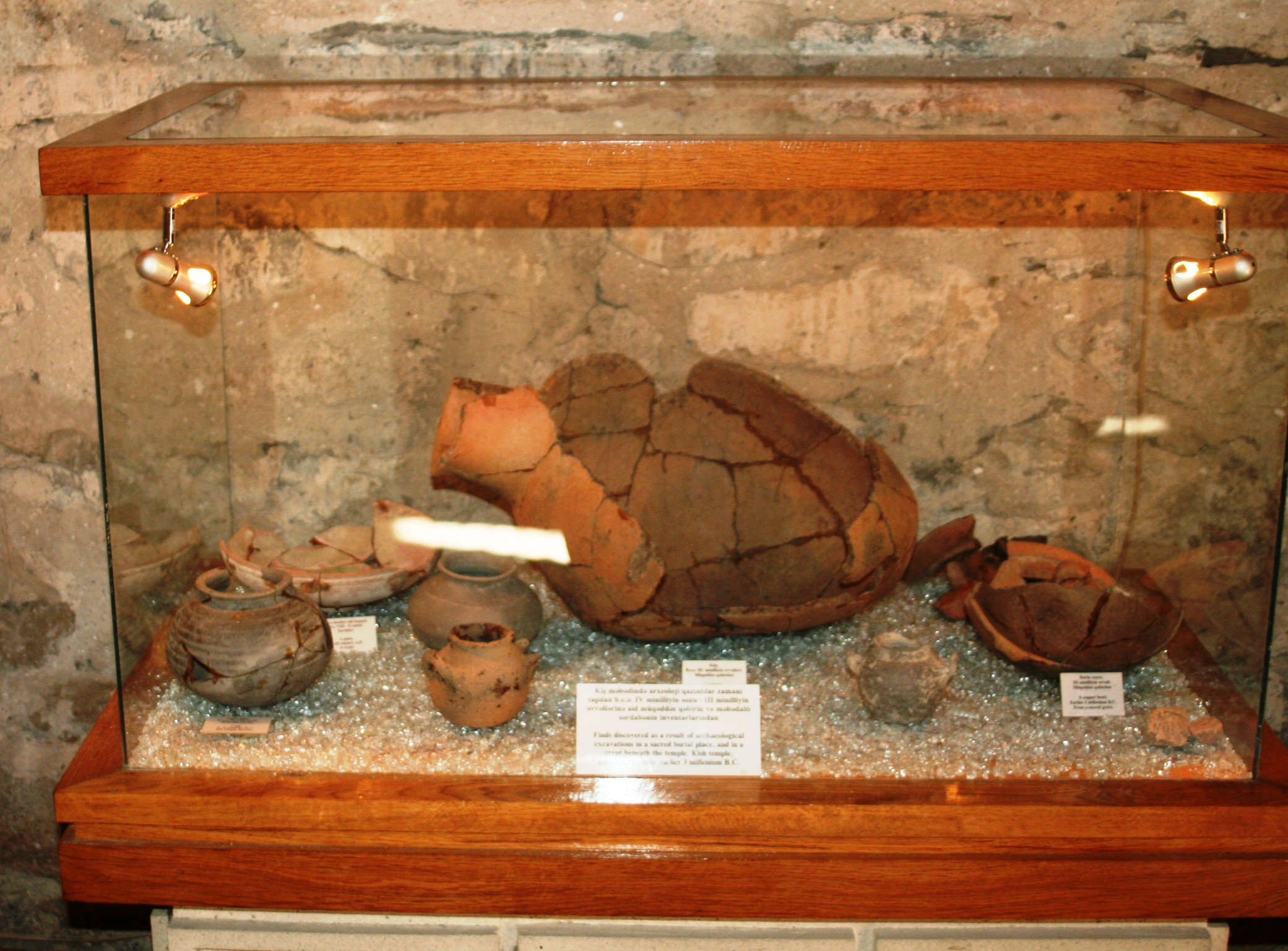
Objects found on the site of the church dating to 3000 B.C.

In 2000–2003 the Norwegian Ministry of Foreign Affairs funded a joint project between Azerbaijan Architecture and Construction University and the Norwegian Humanitarian Enterprise for the archaeological research and restoration of the church of Kish. Dr. Vilayat Karimov of Baku's Institute of Archaeology and Ethnography served as the director of excavations, and the archaeological advisor for the project was J. Bjørnar Storfjell. Radiocarbon analysis of various objects found on the site showed that the cultic site found beneath the altar of the church dates to about 3000 B.C., while the construction of the existing church building dates to about the 12th century (990–1160 A.D. calibrated Carbon-14 date).

The existing church building cannot be dated to the times of St. Elishe, but the archaeological evidence demonstrates that the church is located on an ancient cultic site. It is very unlikely that St. Elishe built in Kish a church in the modern understanding of this word. Even if the person did exist, it appears likely that he built only the altar or used an existing pagan cult structure.

Bjørnar Storfjell stated that there's clear evidence that this church was built as diophysite church. Excavations revealed that the church represented two different periods of use, with two different corresponding floor levels of the chancel area. A chancel (the altar area, where the priest officiates) only slightly elevated in comparison to the nave reflects a diophysite view on the nature of Christ (Jesus is seen as equally divine and human at the same time), while a higher elevation of the chancel is typical of Monophysitism (Christ is seen as purely divine). The officiating priest is seen as the representative of Jesus, and the Christological approach reflects on the priest's degree of proximity to the worshippers. In Kish, the floor level of the chancel was raised during a second period of use from a mere 30–40 cm to about one meter (100 cm) above that of the nave. According to Storfjell, the architecture of the apse of the original church in Kish suggests a diophysite Christology, and since the Georgian Church was the only diophysite church existing in the Caucasus in the late medieval period, it seems reasonable to suggest that the Kish church was initially built as a Georgian church and was later taken over by monophysites. At the time, the monophysite doctrine was represented in the region by two Churches: the Armenian and the Caucasus Albanian Church, the latter having adopted Monophysitism during the eighth century. Storfjell posits that the rising of the chancel floor to 1 meter above the nave floor level took place in the 17th century, while under the control of the Caucasus Albanian Church.

== Gallery ==
Plan of the church

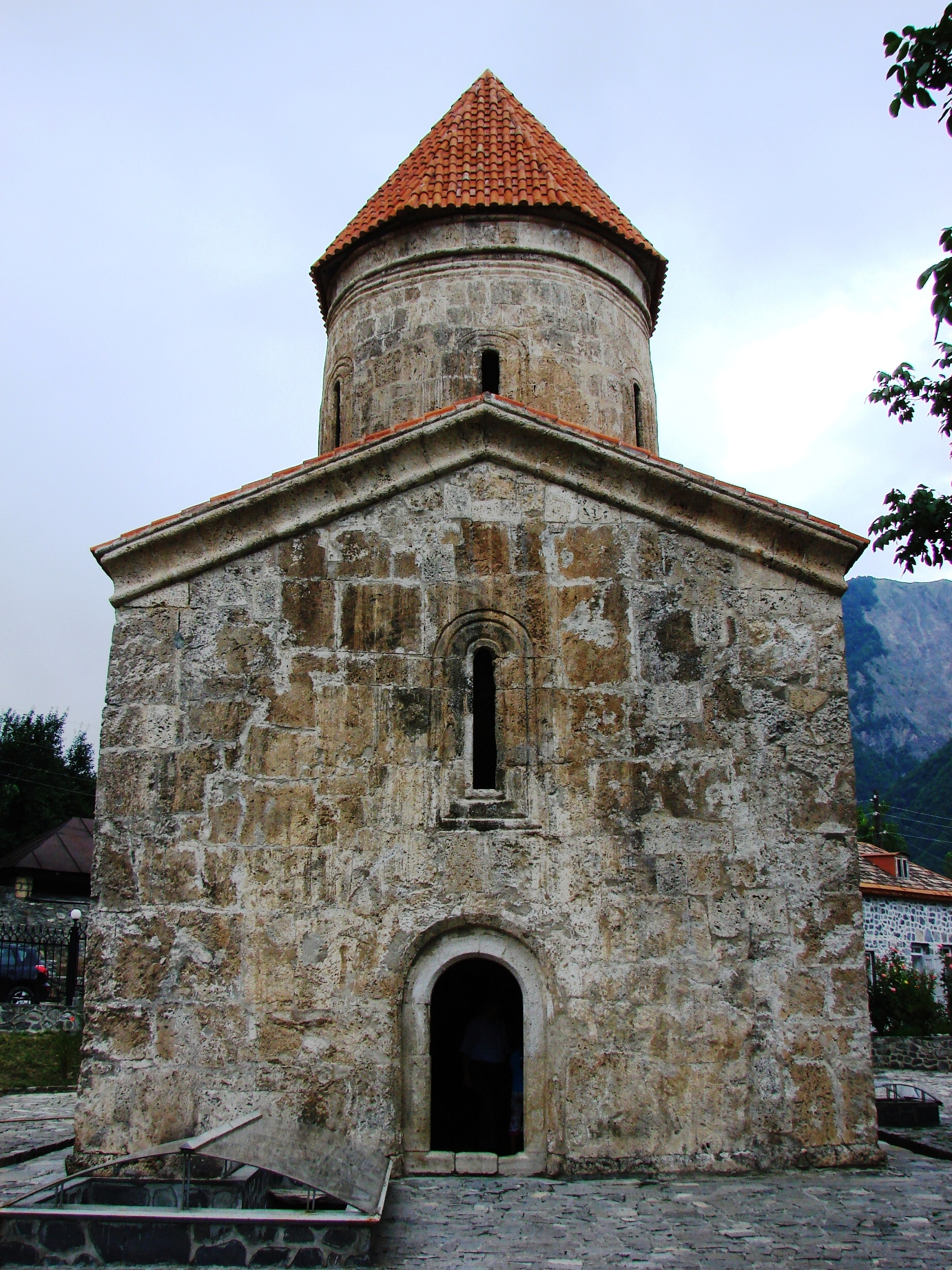
West facade with entrance (2007)

View from south-east (2026)

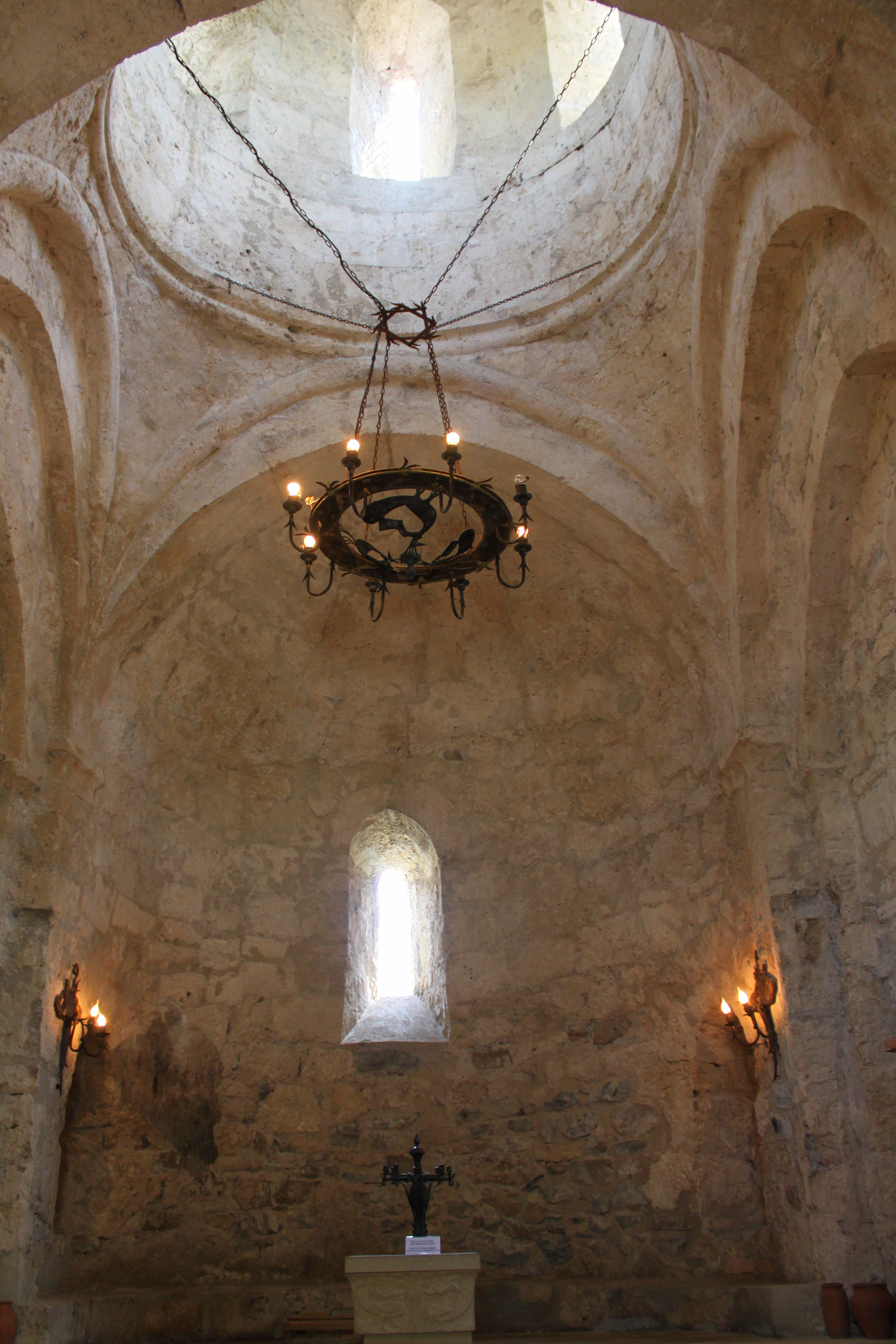
Altar and dome (2011)

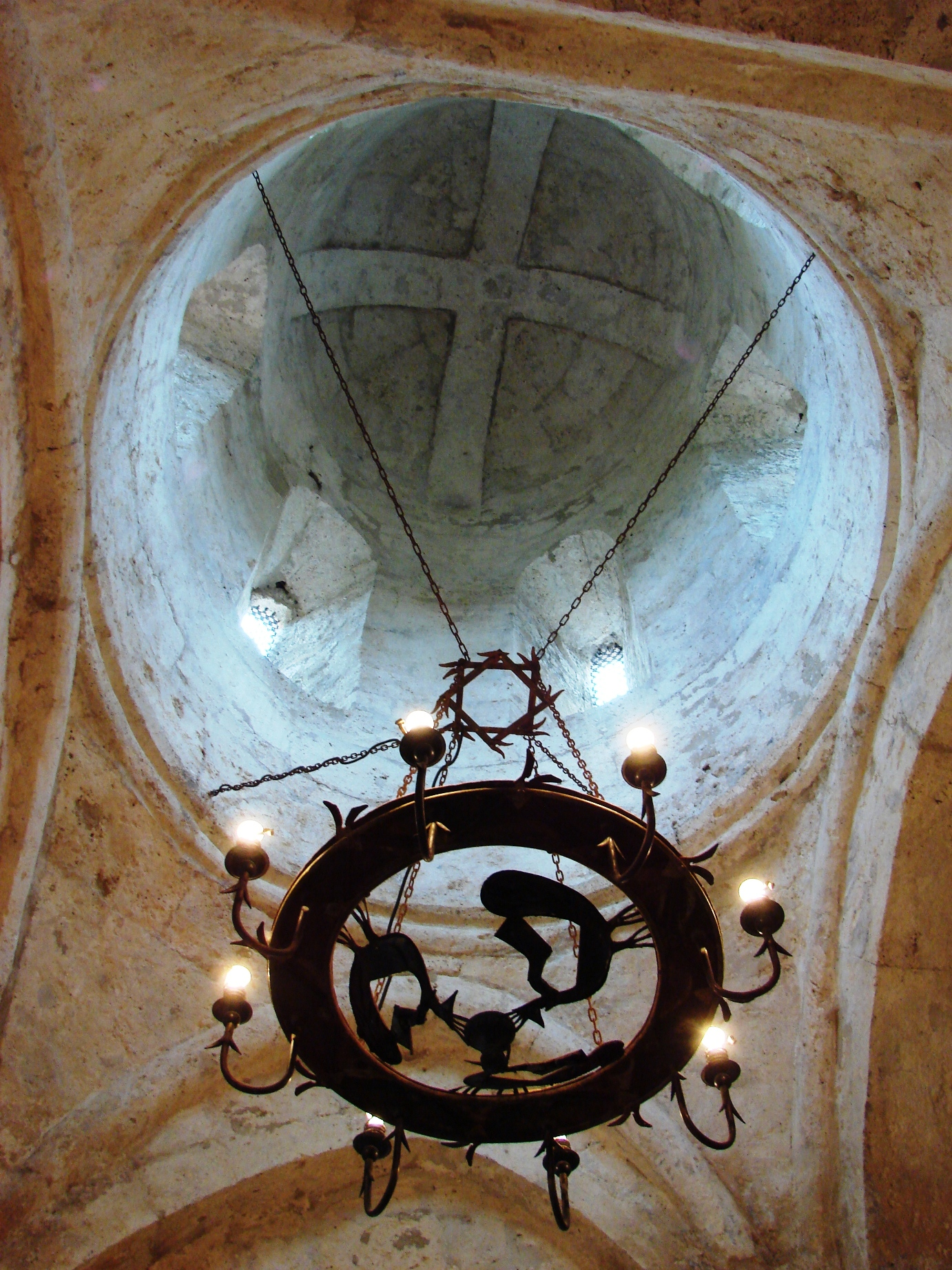
Dome with cross decoration and chandelier (2007)

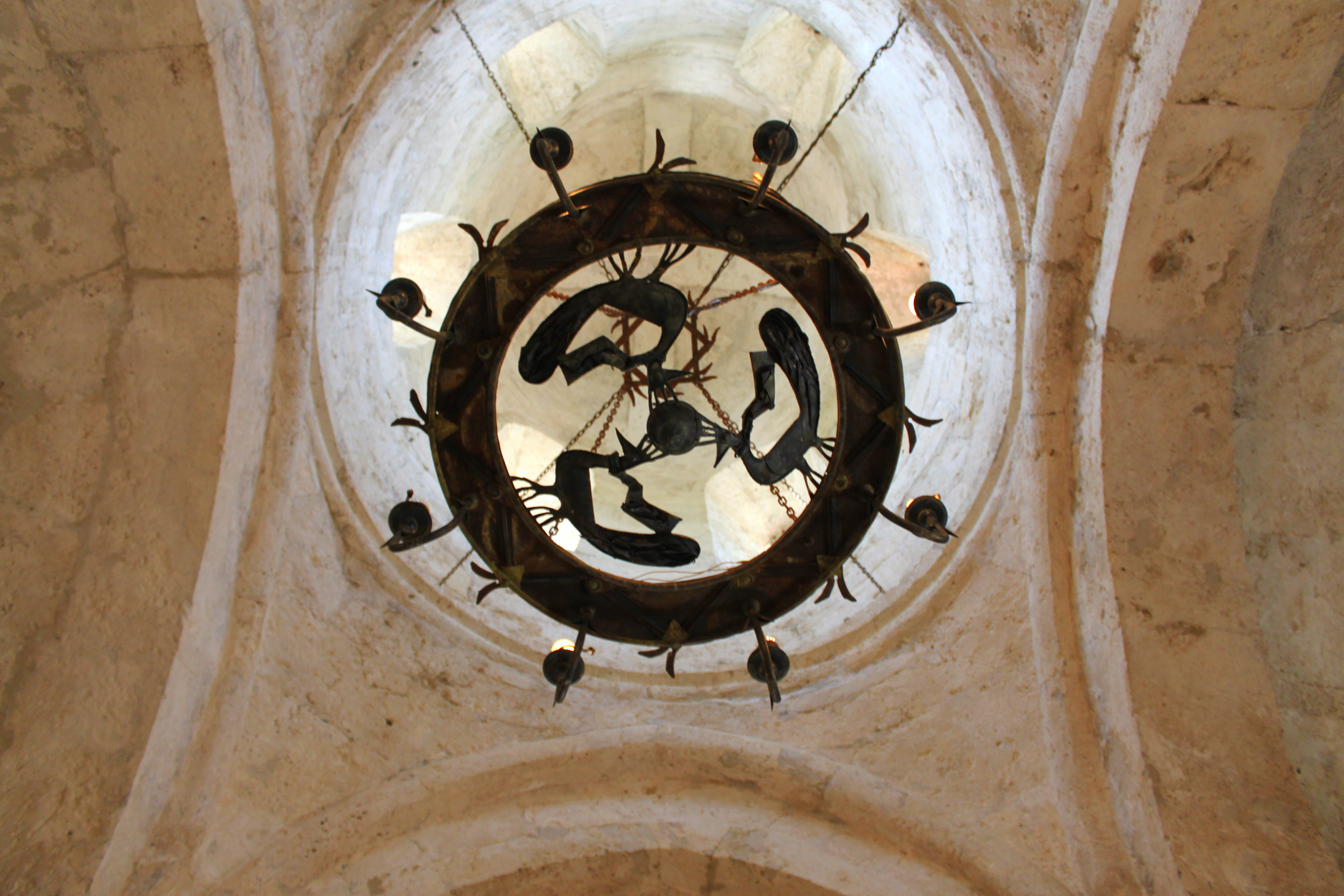
Dome and chandelier (2011)

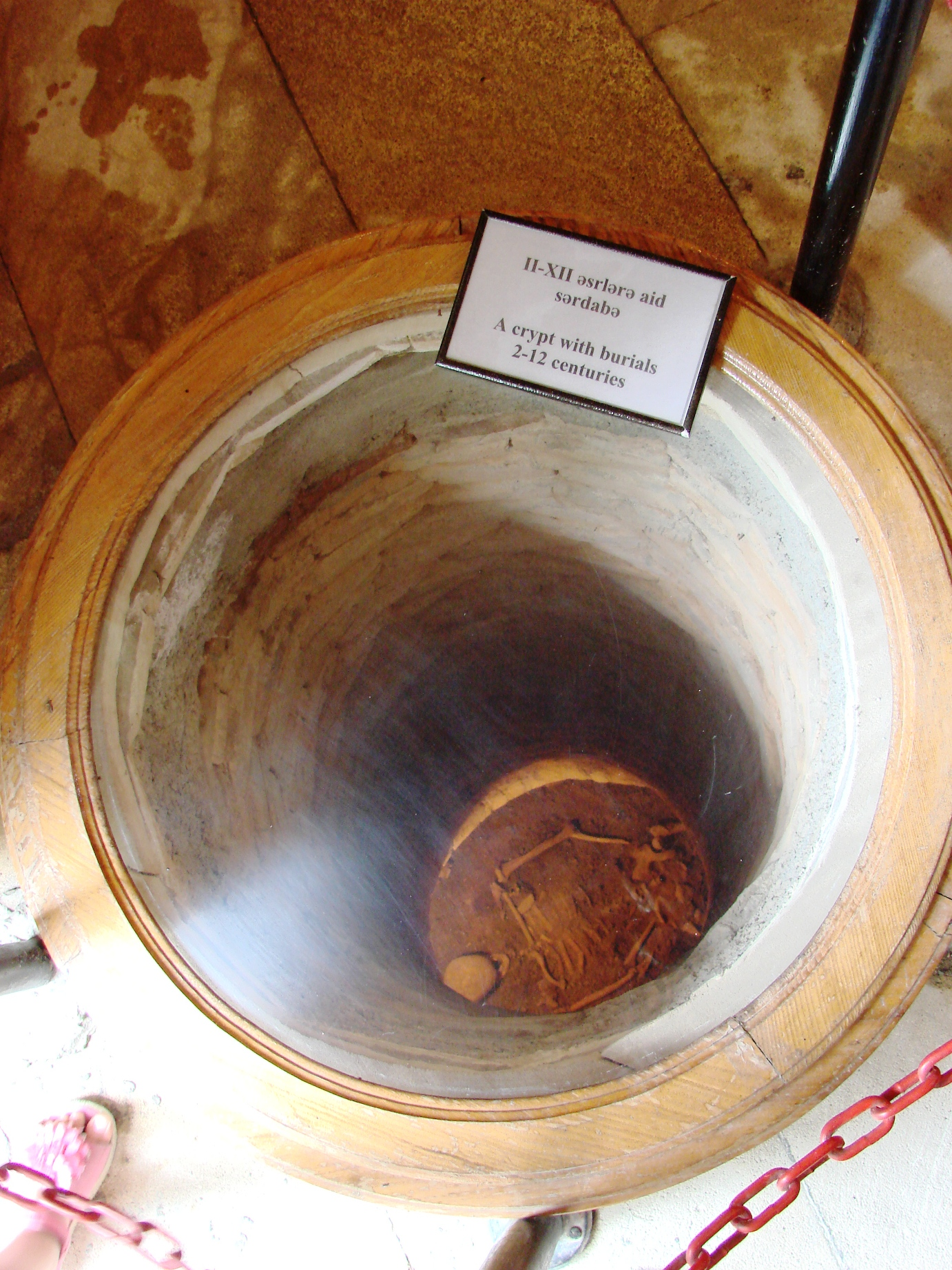
Crypt with burials (2007)

== See also ==
- Georgian Orthodox Church
- Church of Caucasian Albania
- Armenian Apostolic Church
