= Chola (historical city) =

Chola was ancient province, as well as its capital city located western coast of Caspian Sea in Toprakhgala (Russian: Топрах-кала) archaeological site of Derbent.

== Names and meaning ==
Several Byzantine, Armenian and Syriac authors recorded the name of province in their manuscript. Most common of those names is Čor (Old Armenian: Ճոր), known from Agathangelos, Moses of Chorene, Yeghishe, Lazar Parpetsi, Ananias of Shirak, Movses Daskhurantsi and Sebeos. All other exonyms are variants of Armenian ones. A Greek variant of this name, Tzoúr (Greek: Tζούρ) was used by Byzantine authors like Procopius. Less used variants were Khorutzon (Greek: Χορουτζόν) or Tzon by Menander and Zouár (Greek: Ζουάρ). 5th century Georgian author Iakob Tsurtaveli names the city as Čora (Georgian: ჭორა) in his Martyrdom of the Holy Queen Shushanik. Islamic authors like Tabari and Ibn Khordadbeh referred to the city as Ṣūl (Arabic: صول), another derivation from Armenian version. Native endonym appears to be of Caucasian origin, Čoˁ (Caucasian Albanian: 𐕖𐕒𐔽). Though some authors also offered an Iranian source with meaning cognate to 'narrow gorge'.

== Identification with Derbent ==
First researchers to equate Chola with Derbent were Nikolai Kuznetsov and Josef Markwart in 19th-20th centuries. Some Northeast Caucasian language speakers still refer to Derbent closer to this word, all meaning 'wall', such as Lezgian: Цал, romanized: Cal or Tabassaran: Цали, romanized: Cali.

== History ==
Chola was located in domains of Maskut Principality, where St. Grigoris was martyred in 4th century. It was mostly populated by possibly Caucasian speaking Chilb people (Armenian: Ճիղբք, romanized: Čiłbk‛), often equated with the Silvi in Pliny's Natural History. It was later incorporated to Caucasian Albania in 448 by Vachagan III and served as center of Church of Caucasian Albania until 552 when Catholicos Abas transferred the seat to Partav (modern Bərdə, Azerbaijan). A pedestal found in Mingachevir Church Complex from 558, refers to the city as the seat of a bishopric. Head of the Church was officially called Catholicos of Albania, Lupenia and Chola. The city was sacked by Böri Shad in 627, captured by Hudhayfah ibn al-Yaman in 654. The city had a considerable Christian population when it was visited by Bishop Israel, ambassador of Albania to Alp Iluetuer in 681–682. Arabs later renamed Chola to Bab-al-Abwab and it became center of an emirate in 869.
