= Elteber =

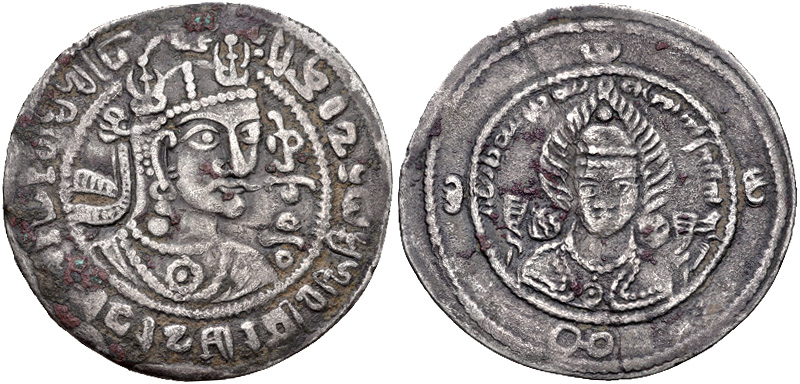
Trilingual coin of Tegin Shah towards the end of his reign. Iranian god Adur on the reverse. Obverse legend: "His Excellence, the Iltäbär of Khalaj, Worshipper of the highest God, His Excellence, the King, the divine Tegin […]". Date in Pahlavi: 728 CE

An elteber (Old Turkic: 𐰃𐰠𐱅𐰋𐰼, romanized: elteber or (h)elitbär; Chinese 頡利發 xié-lì-fā < EMCh: *γεt-li^{H}-puat) was a client king of an autonomous but tributary tribe or polity in the hierarchy of the Turkic khaganates including Khazar Khaganate.

In the case of the Khazar Khaganate, the rulers of such vassal peoples as the Volga Bulgars (only until 969, after that they were independent and created a powerful state), Burtas and North Caucasian Huns were titled elteber or some variant such as Ilutwer, Ilutver (North Caucasian Huns), Yiltawar or İltäbär (Volga Bulgaria) (until 969). An Elteber (Almış) is known to have met the famous Muslim traveller Ibn Fadlan and requested assistance from the Abbasids of Baghdad.

The earliest extant mention of the term is for a ruler of the North Caucasian Huns in the 680s, referred to in Christian sources from Caucasian Albania as Alp Ilutuer. The title was also mentioned in Letter to Kültegin in 732. It was used by rulers of pre-Islamic Volga Bulgaria during the period of their vassalage to the Khazars.

Rásonyi (1942:92), apud Golden (1980:149), glossed an "il teber" as "one who steps on the il at the head of conquered tribes"; with il descending from Proto-Turkic *ēl "realm" (Clauson, 1972:121; Sevortijan, 1974:339) whereas täbär from Turkic root *täp- "to kick with foot" (or *tep- / *dēp- "to stamp, tramp"). However, Erdal (2007:81-82) objects to Rásonyi's proposal: Erdal points out that "the Orkhon Turkic aorist of täp- would be täpär" and instead suggests a non-Turkic origin for the title. Róna-Tas (2016:72–73) proposes an Iranian etymology; he compares the Turkic title (H)elteber to Manichean Bactrian l’dβr, Written Sogdian δātβar, Sogdian ryttpyr / dyttpyr (*litbir), etc. from Middle Iranian *lātbär < Old Iranian *dāta-bara "who brings the law", ultimately from Proto-Indo-European roots *dʰēH "to put, place" & bʰer- "to bring", respectively.

== See also ==
- Volga Bulgaria
- Eastern Europe
- Rutbils of Zabulistan
