= Mingachevir Church Complex =

- Mingəçevir Kilsə Kompleksi

Religion
- Affiliation: Christian

Location
- Country: Azerbaijan
- Interactive map of Mingachevir Church Complex
- Coordinates: 40.79°N 47.028333°E

Architecture
- Completed: Between 4th and 7th centuries

Mingachevir Church Complex (Azerbaijani: Mingəçevir Kilsə Kompleksi) is a Caucasian Albanian Apostolic Church complex belonging to the 4th and 7th centuries which were discovered during the construction of Mingachevir Hydroelectric Power Plant in 1946. The complex was built on the basements of an ancient Zoroastrian temple.

== The construction of the complex ==
There are 4 temples in the complex. The oldest one in the complex is the first temple which was discovered on the lower layer of the ancient residential area in Mingachevir. The temple is quarter-shaped building with a length of 19,4 meters and a width of 7,7 meters. The walls of the temple, except the eastern walls, have been partially preserved. Not having an altar on its eastern part is the characteristic feature of the temple.

The residential area was formed in the 3rd century and Christianity was adopted as a state religion in Caucasian Albania in the 4th century. Taking these facts into account archeologists consider that the temple belongs to the 4th and 5th centuries. There are 6 ledges on the north and south walls of the temple. These ledges played the role of a seat for worshipers and are typical especially for some Orthodox cathedrals and patriarchal churches. They were usually constructed near the chorus.

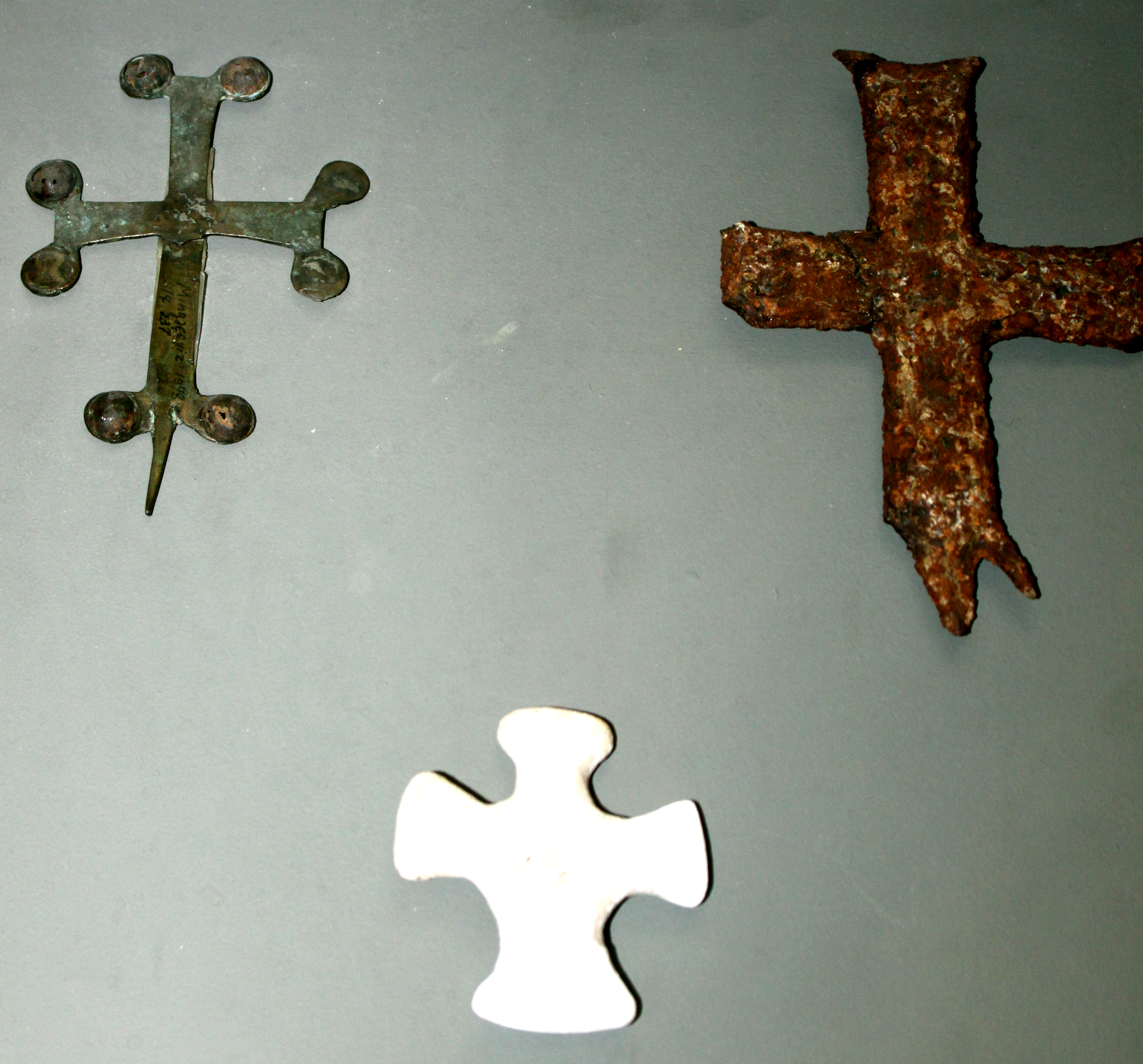
Crosses from Mingachevir Church Complex

The second temple has all the features of a Christian church. The rectangular hall (12.40 x 5.40 m) is completed with the semi-circular altar apse attached to it after the temple construction. 4 round bottom pillars were found inside the hall. Archaeologists believe that these stones belong to the four pillars that keep the temple roof. Both the columns and the temple cover were made of wood. In this case, three planes are separated into the temple plan. As in the basilica, the middle part was built taller than the external ones. The ruins of a tiny building adjacent to it were discovered in the north-eastern part of the temple that this building could be considered as the primary variant of the narthex, which later became one of the integral elements of the Christian temples. This temple also draws attention to the decorative stones which confirm the architectural and artistic character of the building. The stone reliefs of this temple are very close to the ornament of polytheistic temples.

The Temple 3 was built on the site of the Temple 1. This temple is one-story basilica with worship hall. On the eastern wall of the temple, there is a semi-circle. The main feature of the Temple 3 is extremely thickness of walls. Thus, the walls of the temple have a thickness of 2.05 meters. The thickness of the walls of the Temple 2 does not exceed 1,3 meters.

The Temple 4 was built on the ruins of the Temple 3. This temple consists of two distinct parts including the oldest southern part with three smaller rooms and the northern part of the church and the narthex. The fifth plant is united in the temple eastward and is interpreted by researchers as an open-air gallery - atrium. Unlike early Roman basics with Atrium, more indoor galleries are typical for South Caucasus architecture. The open-air gallery of the 4th temple included in the Mingachevir church complex is an example of such atriums in the region.

The oldest southern part of the temple was a three-room flat with wooden ceilings and bricks. The window and door edges had thin wooden borders. The temple is likely to be a semi-arched cordon, and the altar part was covered with a conch. Here, bricks were also used as foreign coatings.

== Research ==
The main building of the temple complex was constructed without a dome. From the chronological point of view, the construction of such monuments began in the IV century, with other more complex buildings, and preserved its existence in architecture until the 8th century. Only the ruins of the temple have survived, and these ruins have been discovered by archaeological excavations.

== Artifacts ==
In Mingachevir, during the excavations of the 6th century, many examples of engraving on the stone were preserved in the columns` remains, holes, and borders of the windows, and the decorative elements of the walls. Heads of columns, borders of window frames and other architectural details of the temple are mainly engraved in the form of ancient arches, the circular bases of columns are covered with ornamental patterns decorating ancient ceramics and metal items. Such extensive use of carving art in the temple building presence of various shapes and wall decoration - curls, khans and paintings once again proves its rich design.

In the decorative design of the monuments, artistic carving was applied to the stone. Findings from that period show that such monuments were used in ancient Armenian ornamental motifs such as hexagonal rugs, sun, cross, winding, and bell-shaped lines. The scenes comply with the bronze seals and ring depictions kept in the Azerbaijan History Museum in Baku for their plasticity, descriptive motifs, and compositional features.

== See also ==
- Church of Kish
- Catholic Church in Azerbaijan
- Religion in Azerbaijan
