= Kiş, Shaki =

Kiş
- Municipality
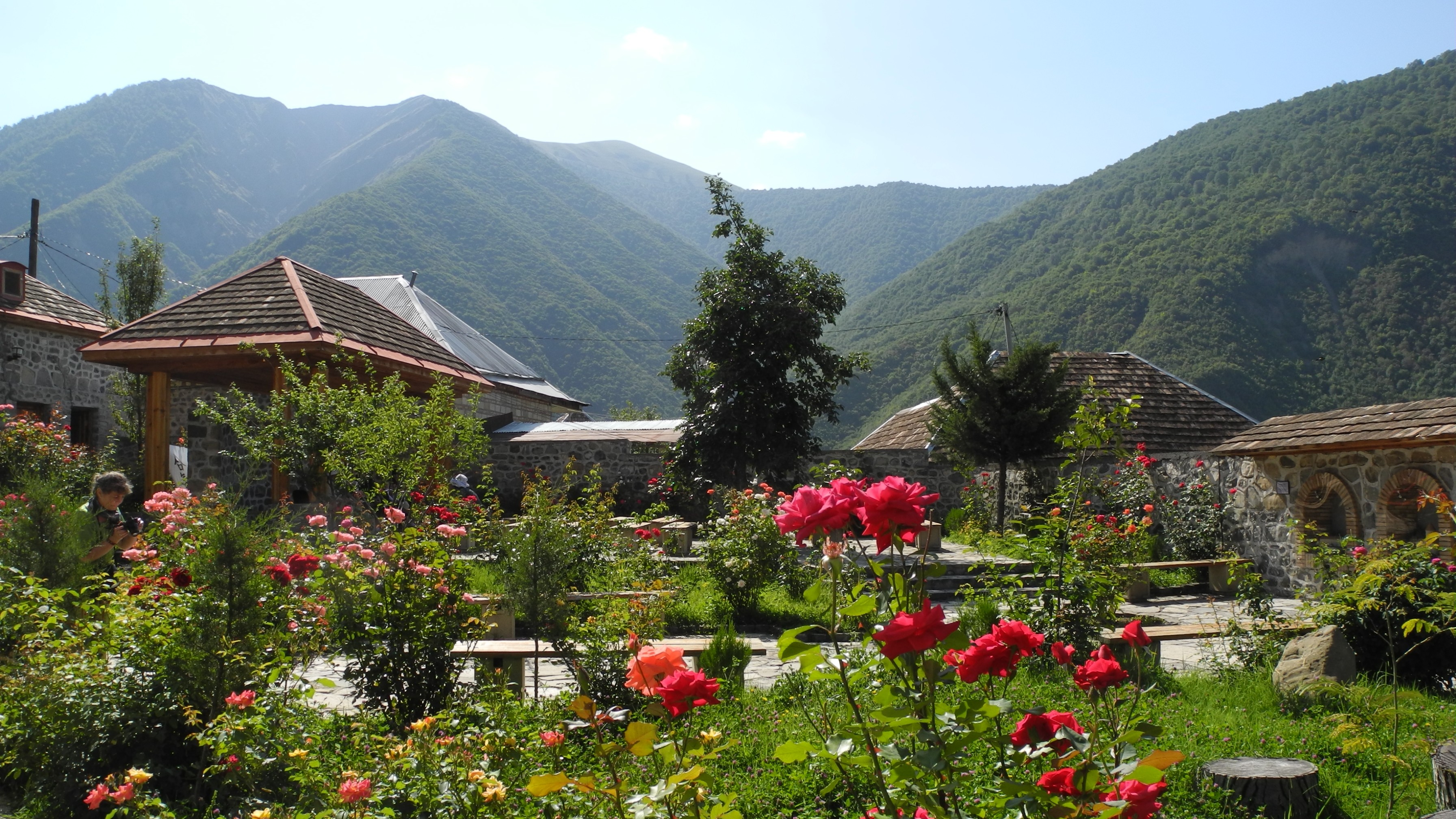

- Location within Azerbaijan
- Coordinates: 41°15′34″N 47°11′17″E
- Country: Azerbaijan
- Rayon: Shaki

Population
  - Total: 6,244
- Time zone: UTC+4 (AZT)
  - Summer (DST): UTC+5 (AZT)
- Postal code: 5525

Kiş (also, Kish and Kish-Kishlak) is a village and municipality in the Shaki Rayon of Azerbaijan. It is about 5 km north of Shaki. It has a population of 6,244.

== Geography ==
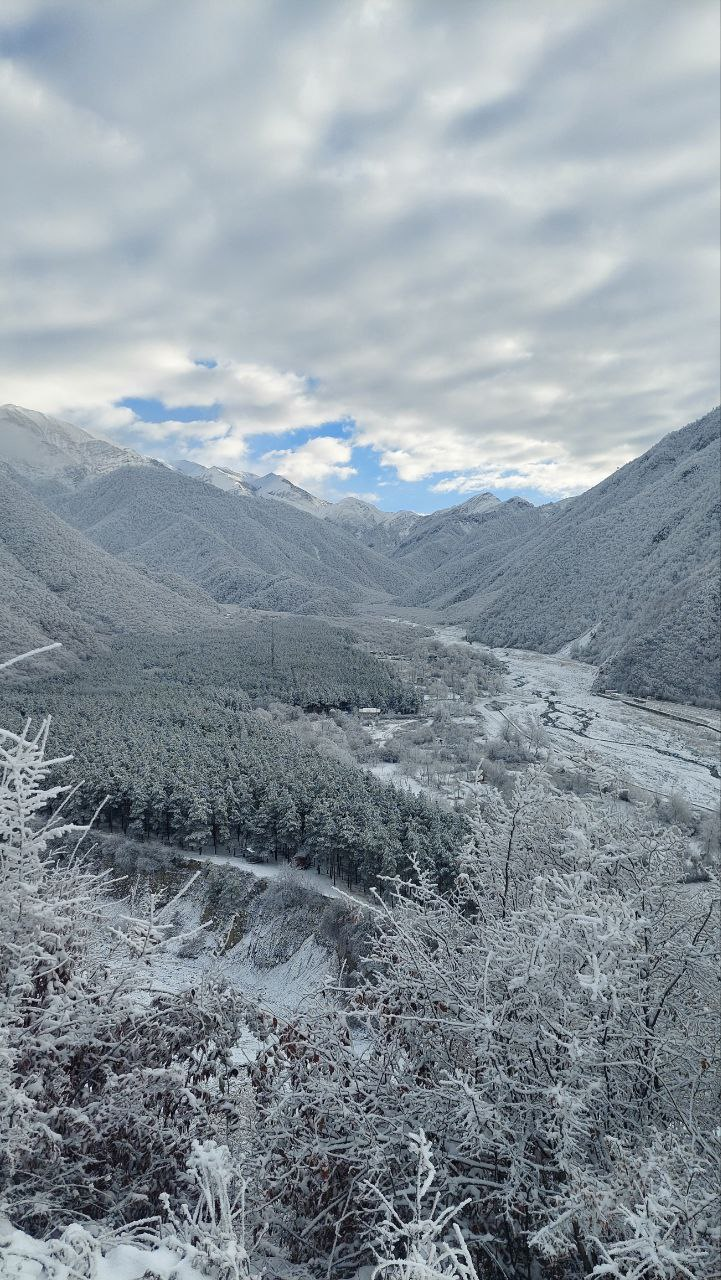
Kish river valley during Winter.

The village is on the shore of the Kish river. The main part of the village surrounded by the mountains is located at the foot of Mount Tat.

The nearest villages are Baltali, Okhud, and Kuhmukh.

== Demography ==
Kish has more than 6500 people according to the results of population census conducted in 2009.

== History ==
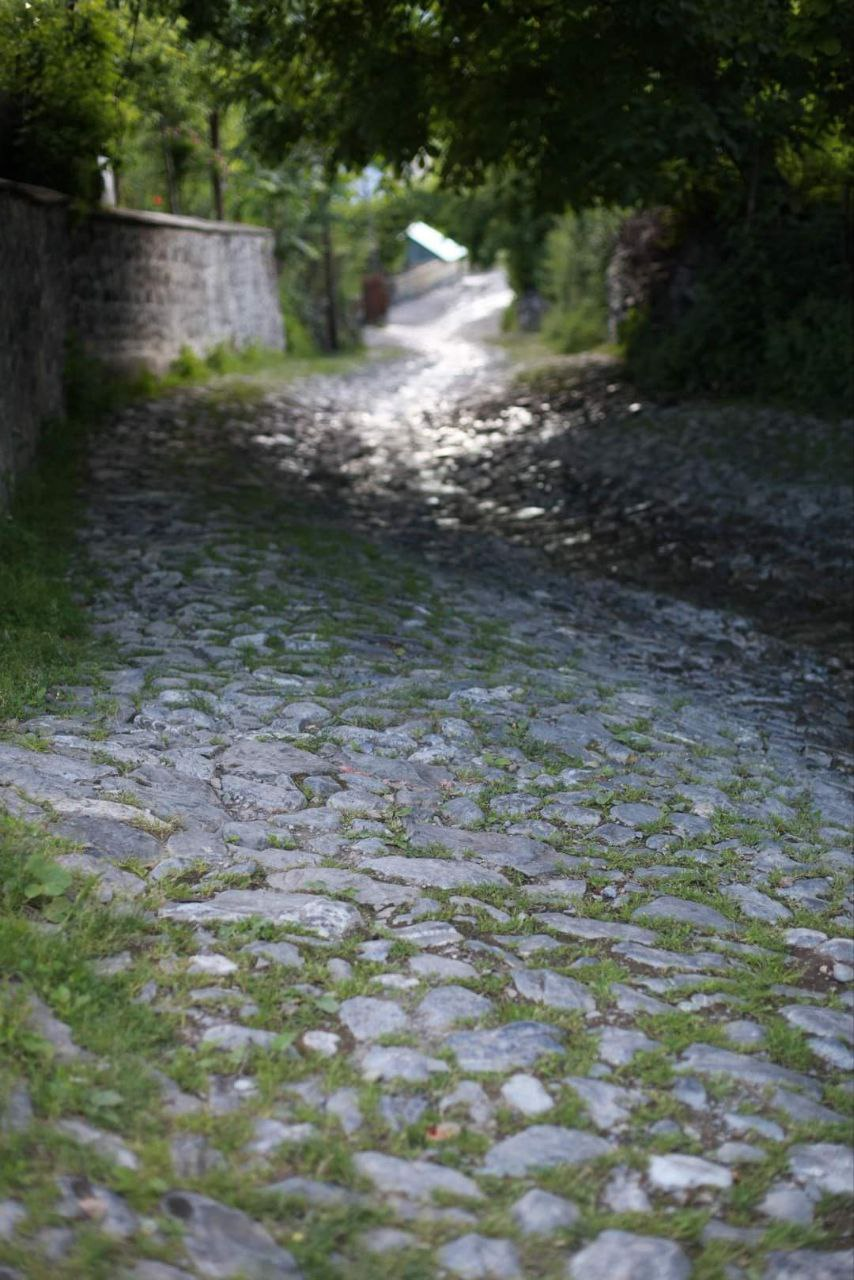
Cobblestone street in the village

According to Movses Kaghankatvatsi, in the 1st century AD St. Elishe, a disciple of Thaddeus of Edessa, arrived to a place called Gis, where he built a church and recited a liturgy. The church became the "spiritual center and the place of enlightenment of people of the East". On his way from Gis St. Elishe was killed near the pagan altar in small Zerguni valley by unknown people.

According to the Baku eparchy of the Russian Orthodox Church, the location of Gis mentioned by Movses Kaghankatvatsi is identified with the present-day Kish, located on the left bank of river Kura, in Shaki district of Azerbaijan. The Church of Kish was the first church built in Caucasian Albania and in the Caucasus. However, according to Armenian commentator Karapetian, the geographical position of Kish does not seem to match that described by Kaghankatvatsi. Karapetian believes that they have identified Gis as the village of Bomen / Bum 60 km to the south-east of Kish, in Gabala district, Uti (Utik) province.

According to Georgian historiography, in the 10th century, the population of Kish converted to the Georgian Orthodox Church. Known at the time as part of Sourb Asvatzatzin Church, Kish turned into a residence of Georgian bishop, functioning till 17th century. The population of Kish converted to Islam in 1720s; however, when Russia later took possession of the region, some villagers returned to Christian faith. In 1836, the Albanian church, along with all active churches in this region that were not Georgian or Russian, was incorporated into the Armenian Apostolic Church, and the Church of Kish was refounded in 1860s and became a place of pilgrimage due to the belief that it was associated with St. Elishe (Yegishe).

== Sightseeing ==
The main historical attraction of the village is the above-mentioned ancient Church of Kish. Since 2003 the temple has been functioning as a museum, inside of which copies of archaeological finds are exhibited. Also, opposite the temple is a monument to the famous Norwegian archaeologist Thor Heyerdahl, who visited the village during archaeological excavations in 2000. In addition, there are 4 fortresses in Kish: "Galarsan-Gorarsan" and fortresses of "Duluzlar", "Salayuşağı" and "Maaflar" neighbourhoods of Kish.

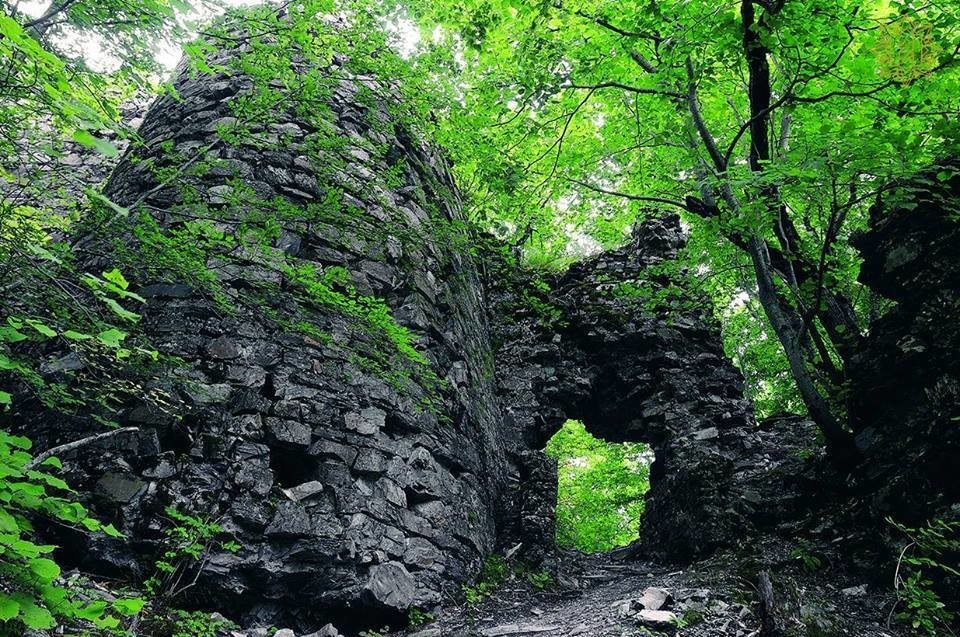
South gate of Galarsan-Gorarsan fortress

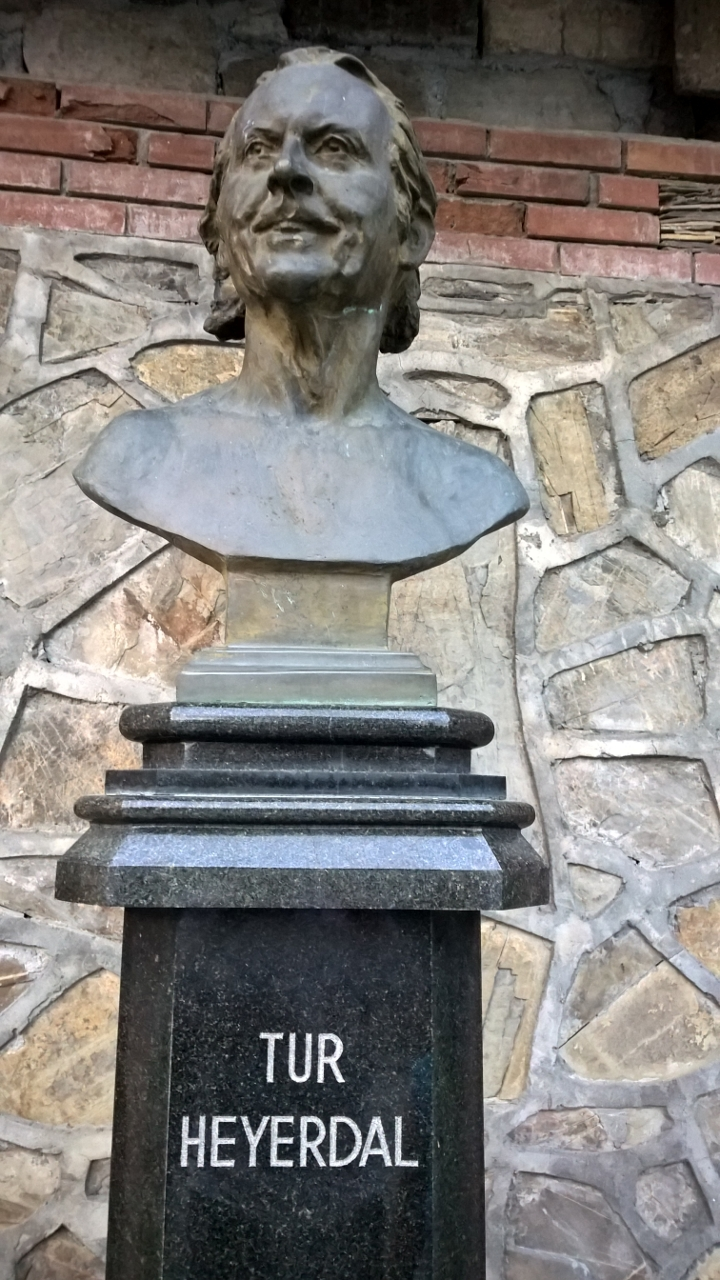
Bust of Thor Heyerdahl

Church of Kish
