= Alp Iluetuer =

Ruler of Chuni, 680s CE

Alp Ilutuer was the Ilutuer (vassal ruler) of the North Caucasian Huns during the 680s CE.

He is mentioned in the account of Bishop Israel of Caucasian Albania, who travelled to Alp Ilutuer's court. During his stay in the land of Huns in 681—682, Israel condemned their pagan beliefs and practices and preached Christianity. His converts offered him to establish and lead a patriarchate there through a special request sent by Alp Iluetuer himself to Eliezer, the Catholicos of Caucasian Albania. However, the request was turned down due to Israel already having been assigned a congregation in Mets Kolmanķ.

Alp is an Old Turkic word meaning "hero", though it also sometimes was used as a personal name. Ilutuer or Elteber is believed to be a cognate of the ancient Turkic title for a vassal ruler (in this case, vassal to the Khazars). Therefore, it is unclear whether Alp Ilutuer is a proper name, a title, or a combination of the two.

In the 670s, he provoked raids against the Khazars and died in war. Alp Iluetuer is still remembered in Bulgar and Chuvash legend.

His name is reconstructable in Old Turkic as *Alp (H)elitbär.
