= Charles Dowsett =

British academic

- Born: 2 January 1924; United Kingdom
- Died: 8 January 1998 (aged 74)
- Other names: Charles Downing
- Occupations: Professor, writer

Charles James Frank Dowsett (2 January 1924 – 8 January 1998) was the first Calouste Gulbenkian Professor of Armenian at the University of Oxford from 1965 to 1991. A teacher and raconteur, he had a large range of interests and culminated in his work on the poet Sayat Nova based on research on the Corpus Scriptorum Christianorum Orientalium in 1996.

== Armenian scholar ==
Born in London, Dowsett came into contact with expert scholar Harold Bailey whilst at Peterhouse, Cambridge, who introduced him to Armenian. After further study (including four years on a substantial British scholarship in Paris), Dowsett was appointed as lecturer in Armenian at the School of Oriental and African Studies in London - the only post in the subject in Britain at the time. In 1965 when the chair was established at Oxford University, he was the obvious candidate.

=== Bibliography ===
- History of the Caucasian Albanians (1961) (translator)
- Penitential of David of Gandzak (1961) (translator)
- The Inscribed Tiles (1972)
- Kütahya Tiles and Pottery from the Armenian Cathedral of St.James, Jerusalem. 2 Volumes. With John Carswell, Oxford: Clarendon Press (1972)
- Sayat'-Nova: An 18th-century Troubadour: a Biographical and Literary Study (1996) ISBN 978-90-6831-795-4

== Children's author ==
Dowsett wrote under the pseudonym "Charles Downing" and published several works for children.

=== Bibliography ===
- Tales of the Hodja (1964) - illustrated by the Greek cartoonist Papas.
- Russian Tales and Legends (1956)
- Armenian Folktales and Fables (1972)
