= North Caucasian Huns =

Chuni; ethnic group c. 100-900 CE

The Khuni, Huni or Chuni were a people of the North Caucasus during late antiquity. They have sometimes been referred to as the North Caucasian Huns and are often assumed to be related to the Huns who later entered Eastern Europe. However, the ethnolinguistic and geographical origins of the Khuni are unclear.

The first contemporaneous reference to the Khuni may be by Dionysius Periegetes and Claudius Ptolemy's Geography, in the 2nd century CE, when they are said to be living near the Caspian Sea.

According to Agathangelos, there were Huns living among the peoples of the Caucasus in 227.

In 535 or 537, an Armenian missionary team headed by the bishop Kardost baptized many of the North Caucasian Huns. The Syriac source reporting this event also indicates that a writing system for Hunnic was developed.

Huns are said to have established a polity in Daghestan in the 6th century CE. This may have incorporated numerous indigenous Caucasian peoples.

In 682 Bishop Israel of Caucasian Albania led an unsuccessful delegation to convert Alp Iluetuer, the ruler of the Caucasian Huns, to Christianity. It has been suggested that Iluetuer is a corruption of the Khazar title elteber ("client-ruler) and that these people were subordinate to Khazar rulers from the mid to late 7th century. They are frequently described as being allied with the Khazars in their various wars of the period, particularly against the Caliphate.

Little is known about their fate after the early 8th century. It is likely that they became incorporated into the Khazar Khaganate. However, it is likely that they survived in some form or another for several centuries, possibly even until the 11th century.

Hunnic state Djidan was an early feudal Kumyk state. The Sabir Huns are considered to be one of the ancestors of the Kumyks.

== See also ==
- Sabir people
- Kumyks
