= Church of Caucasian Albania =

Ancient church established in the 5th century

The Church of Albania or the Albanian Apostolic Church was an ancient, briefly autocephalous church established in the 5th century. In 705, it fell under the religious jurisdiction of the Armenian Apostolic Church as the Catholicosate of Aghvank centered in Caucasian Albania, a region spanning present-day northern Azerbaijan and southern Dagestan.

In medieval times, the Gandzasar monastery served as the See of the Catholicosate of Aghvank of the Armenian Apostolic Church, which continued to exist until 1828 (or 1836) when it was formally abolished by the Russian authorities, following the forced cession of the last territories in the Caucasus maintained under Iranian Qajar rule per the Treaty of Turkmenchay and the Russo-Persian War (1826–1828).

== History ==
=== Origins of Christianity in Caucasian Albania ===
According to folk lore, Elisæus of Albania, a disciple of Addai of Edessa (or possibly Jude the Apostle), brought Christianity to Caucasian Albania in the 1st century, building a church and reciting a liturgy at Gis (Գիս) (Kiş), today commonly believed to be the Church of Kish north of Shaki, Azerbaijan. The church became the "spiritual center and the place of enlightenment of people of the East". On his way from Gis, Elisæus was killed near the pagan altar in the small Zerguni valley by unknown people.

=== Initial Spread of Christianity in Caucasian Albania ===
Shortly after the Christianization of Armenia in 301 AD, Urnayr, the Arsacid king of Caucasian Albania, went to the See of the Armenian Apostolic Church to be baptized by Gregory the Illuminator, the founder and first Catholicos of the Armenian Apostolic Church.

After Urnayr's death, the Caucasian Albanians requested that Gregory the Illuminator's grandson, Grigoris, lead their church. Grigoris had been ordained bishop of Caucasian Albania and Iberia at age 15 and traveled through those lands preaching Christianity. He built Caucasian Albania's third known church in the city of Tsri, in Utiķ. During his stay in the land of the Maskout in northeast Caucasian Albania, Grigoris was attacked by an angry mob of idol worshipers, tied to a horse and dismembered. His remains were buried near the Amaras Monastery built by his grandfather.

In probably the early 5th century, a local bishop by the name of Jeremy translated the Bible into the Caucasian Albanian language (Old Udi). The earliest extant excerpts of translations of parts of the Bible into Old Udi come from the 7th century, and were based mostly upon Armenian translations. These translations were commissioned probably by Juansher.

=== Struggle with Persian Zoroastrianism ===
According to the 5th century Armenian historian and vardapet Elishe, in 450 the Sasanid king of Persia Yazdegerd II ordered the highest nobles in Caucasian Albania, Armenia, and Georgia to come to his capital in Ctesiphon for the purpose of compelling their conversion to Zoroastrianism. Prior to going, representatives from all three nations vowed to each other that they would never relinquish their faith. Although while in Ctesiphon the nobles relented, were showered with gifts, and sent back to their lands accompanied by Zoroastrian priests to establish the religion in their respective nations, upon returning home these nobles were spurred by popular sentiment to hold more firmly to their Christian faith and rebel against King Yazdegerd II under the leadership of the Armenian noble Vardan Mamikonian. Vardan Mamikonian was killed, and the revolt was defeated, at the Battle of Avarayr in 451. The king of Caucasian Albania, Vache II of Albania, converted to Zoroastrianism.

Around 457 AD, Vache II took advantage of a dynastic dispute between Peroz I and Hormizd III to declare independence and re-convert to Christianity. Vache's rebellion ended when Peroz offered him peace and the right to remain a Christian, but only if Vache would allow his mother and wife, who were both Persian and Zoroastrian by birth, to return to their homeland. Vache complied, abdicated, and lived the rest of his life in solitude. Caucasian Albania was left kingless from 462 to 485.

=== Golden Age ===
Christianity reached its golden age in the late 5th century under Vachagan III the Pious (ruled 485–523), who launched a campaign against idol worship and witchcraft in Caucasian Albania and discouraged Zoroastrianism. Those who propagated idol worship were physically punished, enslaved, or ostracized. King Vachagan would personally arrange for their children to be taken to schools and raised Christian. He took an active part in Christianizing Caucasian Albanians and appointing clergy to monasteries throughout his kingdom. On his orders, the site of St. Gregoris' burial was discovered and venerated.

In 488, Vachagan convoked the Council of Aghuen in his summer residence near present-day Mardakert. During the council, a twenty-one paragraph codex formalizing and regulating the important aspects of the Church's structure, functions, relationship with the state, and legal status was adopted.

=== Proselytism among the Huns ===
In the 6th century AD the Huns had established themselves in the North Caucasus, in what is now Dagestan. At the time of Juansher's rule (635–669), they maintained friendly relations with Caucasian Albania. Juansher's assassination in 669 provoked the Huns to launch raids into the country in retaliation for their ally's death. The new ruler Varaz-Tiridates I, who was Juansher's nephew, delegated Israel, Bishop of Mets Kolmanķ, to persuade the Hunnic ruler Alp Iluetuer to make peace, as the people of Caucasian Albania could not be held responsible for a deed committed "by the hand of one treacherous and vile man." During his stay in the land of Huns in 681—682, Israel condemned their pagan beliefs and practices, and preached Christianity. His converts invited him to establish and lead a patriarchate there through a special request sent by Alp Iluetuer to Eliezer, Catholicos of Caucasian Albania. Israel, who had already been assigned a congregation in Mets Kolmanķ, declined, and there is little evidence of Christianity among the Huns thereafter.

=== Decline and Subordination ===
After the overthrow of Nerses in 705, and the expulsion from Armenia by Catholicos Elias I, the Caucasian Albanian elite decided to reestablish the tradition of having their Catholicoi ordained through the Patriarch of Armenia, as was the case before 590. This event is generally regarded as the abolition of the Church of Caucasian Albania through the loss of its autocephaly, and the lowering of its hierarchical status to that of a subordinate body within Armenian Apostolic Church; namely, the Catholicosate of Aghvank.

The Arab conquest and the Chalcedonian crisis led to severe disintegration of the Church. Starting from the 8th century, some of the local population underwent mass Islamization. By the 11th century there already were prominent mosques in Partav, Chabala, and Shaki, cities that had been centers of Caucasian Albanian Christianity. Caucasian Albanians that converted to Islam were over time assimilated into the Azeri, Iranian, Lezgian, and Tsakhur ethnic groups, whereas those that remained Christian gradually became the Armenians of Shaki and Vartashen (Oğuz) through assimilation.

Hereti, a Transcaucasian province bordering the Georgian state of Kakheti, under influence the Georgian Orthodox Church, was converted to Eastern Orthodoxy by Ishkhanik of Hereti, Queen of Hereti in the 10th century. The religious affairs of this small principality were now officially administered by the Georgian Orthodox Church. In 1010, Hereti became absorbed into the neighbouring Georgian Kingdom of Kakheti. Eventually in the early 12th century, these lands became part of the Georgian Kingdom under David the Builder finalizing the process of their Georgianization.

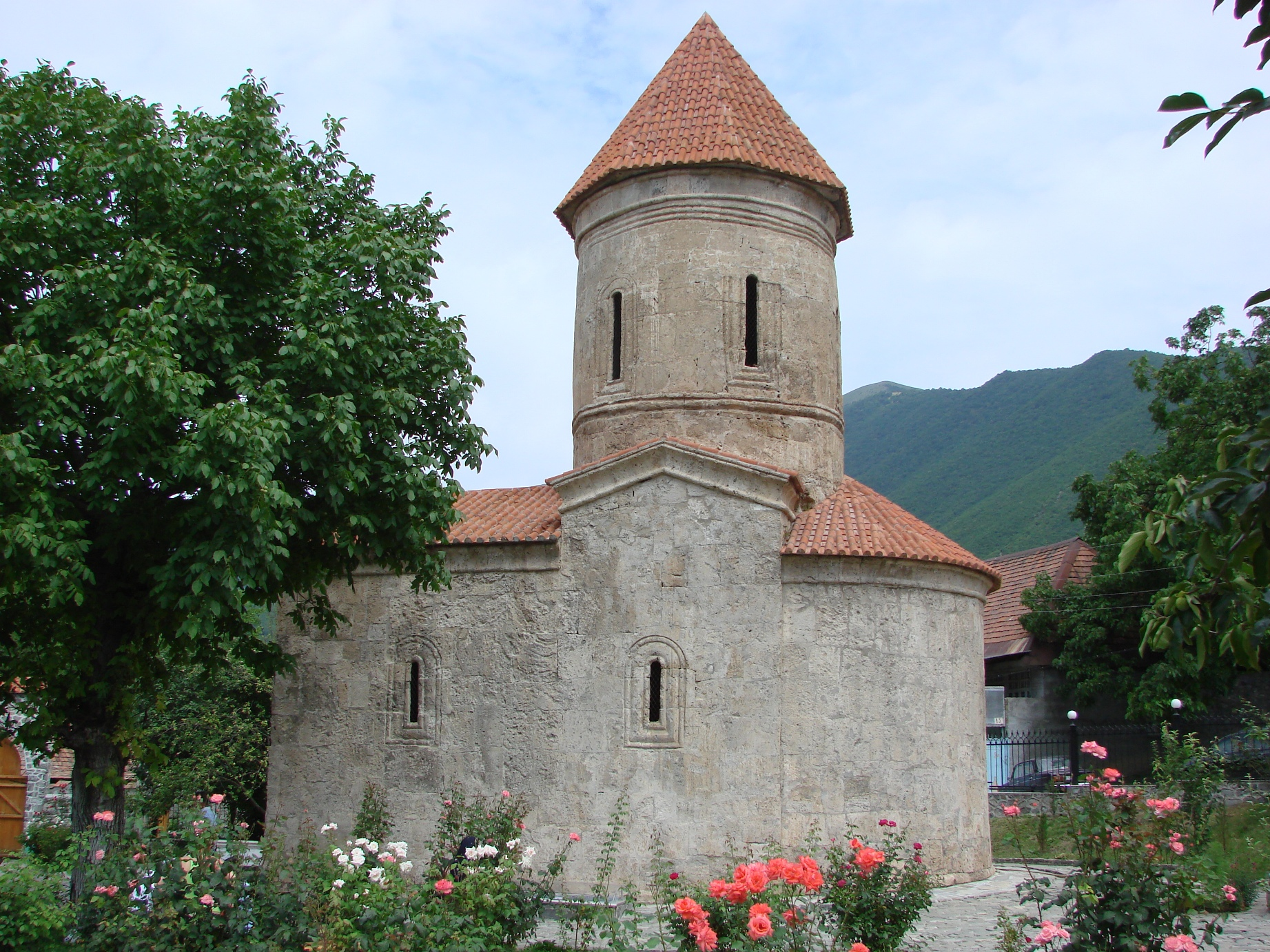
Side view of the Church of Kish

The Caucasian Albanian tribes were divided between the Chalcedonian Georgian Orthodox North centered around the bishopric of Kish and the Armenian Apostolic Church of the south.

At the beginning of Safavid rule, there were 200,000 Christian Caucasian Albanians in the provinces of Vartashen, Qabala, Qakh, Zaqatala, Mingechavur, Shaki. After the Khanate of Shaki was established in the region both the Chalcedonian and Armenian churches underwent severe persecution during the 17th and 18th centuries and much of the tribes converted to Islam, by the 19th century the Georgian Orthodox church was completely extinct with the exception of some Ingiloy. There were 17 Miaphysite villages of the Armenian Church left in Shaki, and the Islamized villages Kish, Faizit, Partez, Kungut (Bash and Chshlagh), Turkish-Orban. Many of the Miaphysite villages faced massacres in 1918–1920 and migrated to the village of Sabatlo in Georgia. In the region of Vartashen (Oghuz) there were 13 Miaphysite villages left, much of the Muslim population being Islamized Udi.

=== Modern Caucasian Albanian-Udi Church ===
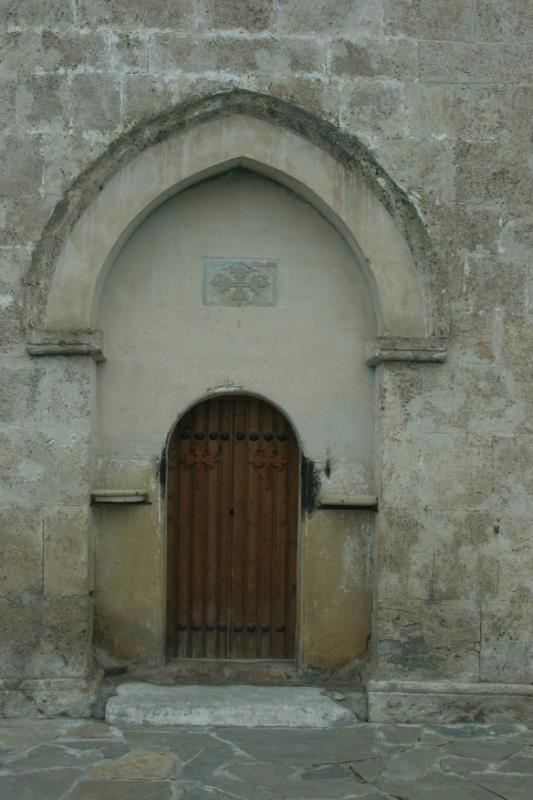
Udi church of Nij

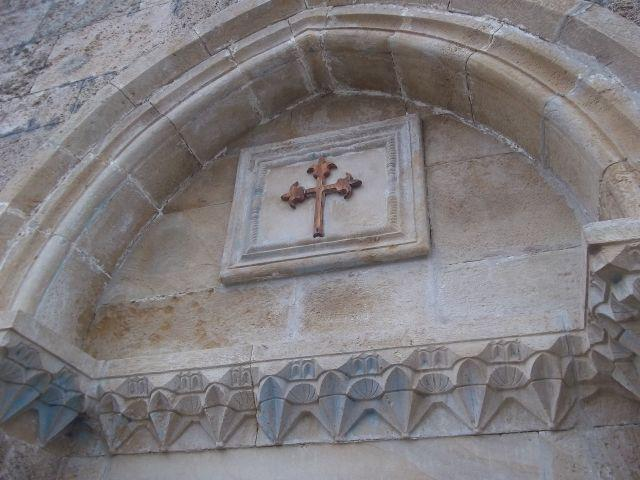
Detail from the Udi church in the village of Nij

In 2003, the Albanian-Udi Christian Community based in Nizh was registered in the Azerbaijan State Committee for Religious Organizations. An estimated 4,500 out of the 10,000 Udis worldwide live in Azerbaijan.

== Structure of the Church ==
=== Theology ===
The Church of Caucasian Albania was represented in the early ecumenical councils and unlike other Oriental Orthodox churches, it generally did accept the Chalcedonian Creed (a doctrine condemning monophysitism and propagating the dual nature of Jesus Christ) adopted at the Fourth Ecumenical Council of Chalcedon in 451, which was viewed as a return to Nestorianism by other Oriental Churches.

Nevertheless, in 491, Caucasian Albanian bishops, along with Armenian Catholicos Babgen I and Georgian bishops at Vagharshapat, decided to reject the Council of Chalcedon. It was not so much the dogmatic formula of Chalcedon which was the problem, the creed was accepted, but the rules on celibacy and other elements which appeared to assert Roman hegemony were a concern for Christians living under Sassanid and then Arabic rule. Later the Second Synod of Dvin held in 551 also condemned the Council of Chalcedon.

At the First Council of Dvin held in 506, without ratifying Chalcedon, the Caucasian Albanian, Armenian, and Georgian churches all declared doctrinal unity with each other, as well as with the dyophysite Eastern Orthodox and Roman Catholic churches. Specifically, at this council the Church of Caucasian Albania rejected both Nestorianism and the legitimacy and conditions of the Fourth Ecumenical Council of Chalcedon. As of the late 6th century, both Nestorian and Chalcedonian beliefs were popular enough in Caucasian Albania to provoke a letter of concern, dated sometime between the years 568 and 571, from Armenian Catholicos Hovhannes addressed to Bishop Vrtanes and Prince Mihr-Artashir of Syunik province. Around the same time, representatives of the Eastern Orthodox Patriarch of Jerusalem were actively promoting Chalcedonian practices in Caucasian Albania. Indeed, it is likely that because of such advocacy and possible coercive pressure, dioceses of the Church of Caucasian Albania located in Jerusalem had already accepted Chalcedonian practices and had begun promoting them back home. By probably the first decade of the 7th century, though, the Church of Caucasian Albania had already come back into communion with the Armenian Apostolic Church as a fellow non-Chalcedonian Oriental Orthodox Church.

In the late 7th century, Catholicos Nerses attempted to install the Chalcedonian decrees in Caucasian Albania. According to Kaghankatvatsi, Nerses was the Bishop of Gardman who adhered to Council of Chalcedon, as did the queen-consort of Caucasian Albania, Spram, the wife of Varaz-Tiridates I. In 688, with Spram's help, Nerses managed to be appointed as Patriarch, planning to bring the country in line with Chalcedonian practice. Many members of the ruling class and clergy accepted his ideas, whereas those that remained loyal to the original teachings of the Church (including Israel, Bishop of Mets Kolmanķ), became subject to repression. The growth of Chalcedonism was contrary to the interests of the Arabs who had taken over most of the Caucasus by the early 8th century, because although affirming Christ's humanity, which the Arabs welcomed, Chalcedonism was still Roman in essence and thus ratifying it was associated with territorial aspirations of the Byzantine Empire. In 705, the anti-Chalcedonian clergy of Caucasian Albania convoked a council and anathematized Nerses and his supporters. Elias, Catholicos of Armenia, followed up by writing a letter to Caliph Abd al-Malik notifying him of the political threat that Chalcedonianism was posing to the region. Abd al-Malik arranged for the arrest of Nerses and Spram, who were then bound in fetters and exiled.

In light of the fact that leaders of the modern Caucasian Albanian Church are considering sending potential clergy to study in Russia, its future may be with dyophysite Eastern Orthodox Christianity rather than Oriental Orthodoxy.

=== Liturgy ===
The liturgical language of the Church was likely one of the local tribal tongues, most likely Gargarian or Caucasian Albanian, which likely were in fact the same language. Caucasian Albania was mentioned by Movses Kaghankatvatsi as having its own literary tradition starting from the 5th century. In his letter to Persian Christians in 506, Babgen I, Catholicos of Armenia, stated that all three churches of the Caucasus were ideologically united despite each having its own language. That Caucasian Albanians probably used their own national language as a liturgical language in their church is suggested by a bilingual Georgian-Old Udi palimpsest manuscript dating back to no later than the 7th century that was discovered in 1997 in Saint Catherine's Monastery in Egypt by Georgian historian Zaza Aleksidze. Towards the abolition of the Church's autocephaly, it was increasingly becoming linguistically Armenized. Among the factors that might have contributed to that are constant raids of the Khazars and the "lawless" who burned churches and with them much of Caucasian Albanian religious literature.

=== Hierarchy ===
The archbishop was considered the head of the Church of Caucasian Albania, and he had traditionally been ordained by the Armenian Catholicos until 590, when Caucasian Albania proclaimed its own locally ordained patriarchy. In general, the seat of the Catholicos was passed down from uncle to nephew. This continued until the abolition of the Church's autocephaly in 706. The city of Chola (possibly present-day Derbent, Russia) had originally been chosen to be the See of the Church of Caucasian Albania. However, in 551, due to plundering raids of "Khazars" (Kutrigurs) on Caucasian Albania, the seat of the archbishop was transferred to Partav.

In various sources, the dioceses of Partav, Amaras, Syunik (temporary transferred over from the Armenian Apostolic Church in 590), Utik, Balasakan, Gardman, Shaki, Kabalaka, Hasho, and Kolmanķ are listed as dioceses of the Church of Caucasian Albania.

=== List of Caucasian Albanian Catholicoi ===
Lineage was established by St. Elisæus the Apostle also known as Yeghishe (dies c. 79) and considered the father of the Church of Caucasian Albania. Lineage continued with St. Grigoris, the grandson of Gregory the Illuminator. Grigoris was invited by Albanian king Urnayr to sit on the throne and continued to rule until 343 AD. Urnayr had converted into Christianity in the hands of Gregory the Illuminator. Lineage continued until 1836 when it was abolished by the Russian authorities and the position of metropolitan established from that date on.

== Legacy ==
In the last chapter of book two, Movses Kaghankatvatsi lists monasteries that were established by Caucasian Albanians in Jerusalem.

- Monastery of Pand
- Monastery of Mrouv
- Monastery of St. Theotokos of Partav
- Monastery of Kalankatouyk
- Monastery of St. Theotokos of Artsakh
- Monastery of St. Gregory of Amaras
- Four other unnamed monasteries repossessed by Arabs at Kaghankatvatsi's time

As a result of the 1988-2024 Nagorno-Karabakh conflict, the Armenian Apostolic Church has not had official representation in Azerbaijan outside Nagorno-Karabakh since the early 1990s. Even as late as 1997, the churches in Udi-populated locales were still closed as a result of the Bolshevik anti-religious campaign of the 1930s.

== Research and dating ==
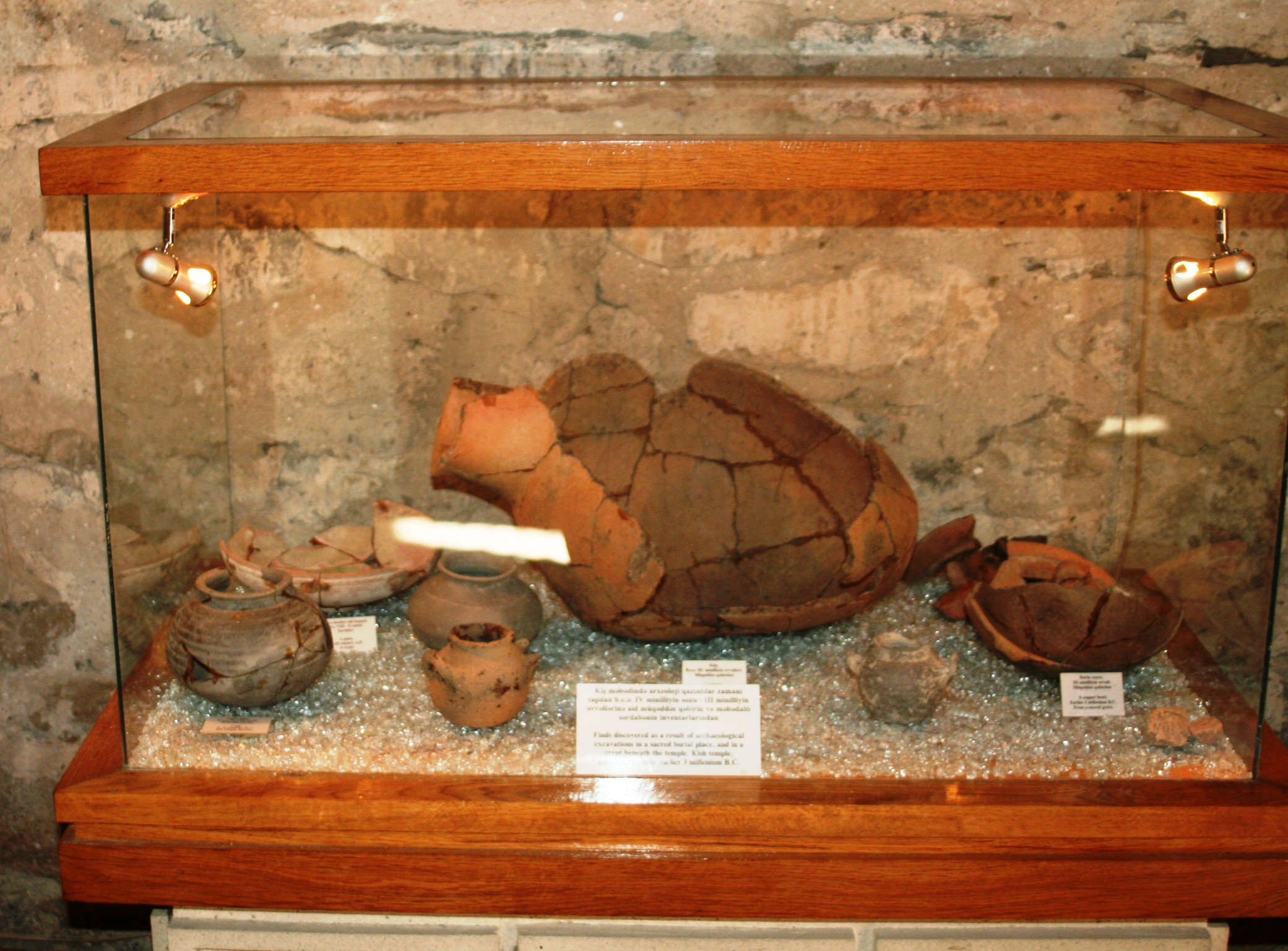
Objects found on the site of the church dating to the end of 4000 B.C. and beginning of 3000 B.C.

In 2000–2003 the Norwegian Ministry of Foreign Affairs funded a joint project between Azerbaijan Architecture and Construction University and the Norwegian Humanitarian Enterprise for the archaeological research and restoration of the church of Kish. Vilayat Karimov of Baku's Institute of Archaeology and Ethnography served as the director of excavations, and the archaeological advisor for the project was J. Bjørnar Storfjell. Radiocarbon analysis of various objects found on the site showed that the cultic site found beneath the altar of the church dates to about 3000 B.C., while the construction of the existing church building dates to about the 12th century (990–1160 A.D.)

The existing church building cannot be dated to the times of St. Elishe, but the archaeological evidence demonstrates that the church is located on an ancient cultic site. It is very unlikely that St. Elishe built in Kish a church in the modern understanding of this word. Even if the person did exist, it appears likely that he built only the altar or used an existing pagan cult structure.

Bjørnar Storfjell stated that there's clear evidence that this church was built as Diophysite church. Excavations revealed that the church represented two different periods of use, with two different corresponding floor levels. According to Storfjell, since the architecture of the apse of the original church in Kish suggests a diophysite Christology, and since the Georgian Church was the only diophysite church existing in the Caucasus in the late medieval period, it seems reasonable to suggest that the Kish church was built as a Georgian church and was later taken over by monophysites.

=== St. Bartholomew ===
According to the 6th-century archbishop and historian St. Sophronius of Cyprus, in 71, St. Bartholomew the Apostle was preaching Christianity in the city of Albana or Albanopolis, associated with present-day Baku or Derbent, both located by the Caspian Sea. St. Bartholomew managed to convert even members of the local royal family who had worshipped the idol Astaroth, but was later martyred by being flayed alive and crucified head down on orders from the pagan king Astyages. The remains of St. Bartholomew were secretly transferred to Mesopotamia. At the beginning of the 19th century, when the Russian Orthodox Church had established itself in the South Caucasus, a chapel was built at the site of an old Caucasian Albanian church in Baku, by the Maiden Tower believed to be the place of St. Bartholomew's martyrdom. The chapel was demolished in the Soviet times, in 1936, in the heat of the Bolshevik campaign against religion.

== See also ==
- Christianity in Azerbaijan
- Religion in Azerbaijan
- Church of Kish

== Bibliography ==
- Babian, Gorun (2001). The Relations between the Armenian and Georgian Churches: According to the Armenian Sources, 300–610. Armenian Catholicosate of Cilicia, Antelias, Lebanon: Kevork Melidi Netsi Literary Award.
- Gippert, Jost; Schulze, Wolfgang (2007). "Some Remarks on the Caucasian Albanian Palimsests". Iran and the Caucasus. 11 (2). Leiden, Netherlands: Koninklijke Brill NV: 201–211. doi:10.1163/157338407X265441.
- Schulze, Wolfgang (2005). "Towards a History of Udi" (PDF). International Journal of Diachronic Linguistics. Archived (PDF) from the original on 4 December 2020.
