= Movses Kaghankatvatsi =

10th-century Armenian historian

Movses Kaghankatvatsi (Old Armenian: Մովսէս Կաղանկատուացի Movsēs Kałankatuacʻi 'Moses of Kaghankatuk'), or Movses Daskhurantsi (Մովսէս Դասխուրանցի Movsēs Dasxurancʻi 'Moses of Daskhuran'), is the reputed author (or the alias of several authors) of a tenth-century Classical Armenian historical work on Caucasian Albania and the eastern provinces of Armenia, known as The History of the Country of Albania (Պատմութիւն Աղուանից Աշխարհի, Patmutʿiwn Ałuanicʿ Ašxarhi).

== Authorship ==
In the works of earlier Armenian authors no name is attached to The History and early in the 13th century, however, Mkhitar Gosh names a Movses Dasxurants'i as the author. The earliest extant manuscript of The History, also of the 13th century (1289), bears no author's name; nor do other manuscripts. The earliest manuscript to bear the name of Movses Kalankatuaci is that copied by the scribe Lunkianos in 1761. The date of the compilation known as The History is based on the fact that the last person to have a hand in The History wrote at the earliest at the end of the 11th or the beginning of the 12th century.

The first historian to mention Movses' work was the medieval Armenian legal scholar Mkhitar Gosh, referring to him as "Movses Daskhurantsi." A later historian, Kirakos Gandzaketsi, referred to a statement in the History itself, to attribute the name of the author as Movses Kaghankatvatsi. The statement in question (Book II, ch. 11) says:

When the enemy became aware of what had happened, they pursued them and overtook a group of them at the foot of the mountain opposite the large village of Kaghankatuik, which is in the same province of Uti where I too am from.

Movses narrates the Khazar invasion of Transcaucasia and other events up to the seventh century in Book I and II of his History. Book III of his History differs from the previous ones in style of writing and date. It deals with the Caspian expeditions of the Rus' and their conquest of Partav in the tenth century. Because of such time lapse and difference in style, attribution of the work to a single author seems doubtful. For this reason it has been common to assume two consecutive authors or editors, Kaghankatvatsi (seventh century) as the author of Books I and II, and Daskhurantsi (tenth century) as the editors of Kaghankatvatsi's text and the author of Book III.

== Publications and translations ==
=== Grabar (Old Armenian) ===
- Movsēs Kaghankatuatsʻi (1860). Patmutʻiwn Aghuanitsʻ ashkharhi Պատմութիւն Աղուանից աշխարհի (PDF). Moscow: Tp. Lazarean chemarani Arewelean lezuatsʻ. Published by N. Emin.
- Movsēs Kaghankatuatsʻi (1860). Patmutʻiwn Aghuanitsʻ Պատմութիւն Աղուանից. 2 vols. Paris: Tp. Karapet Shahnazarean. (Vol. 1, vol. 2.)
- Movsēs Kaghankatuatsʻi (1912). Patmutʻiwn Aghuanitsʻ ashkharhi Պատմութիւն Աղուանից աշխարհի (PDF). Tiflis: Tparan ōr. N. Aghanean. A reprint of the 1860 Moscow edition.
- Movsēs Kaghankatuatsʻi (1983). Patmutʻiwn Aghuanitsʻ ashkharhi Պատմութիւն Աղուանից աշխարհի. Critical text and introduction by Varag Arakelian. Erevan: HSSH GA hratarakchutʻyun.

=== Modern Armenian ===
- Movses Kaghankatvatsʻi (1969). Patmutʻyun Aghvanitsʻ ashkharhi Պատմություն Աղվանից աշխարհի. Translated by Varag Arakelian. "Hayastan" hratarakchʻutʻyun.

=== Russian translations ===
- Istorīia Agvan Moĭseia Kagankatvatsi, pisatelia X vieka Исторія Агванъ Мойсея Каганкатваци, писателя X вѣка. Translated by K. Patkanov. Saint Petersburg: Tip. Imp. Akad. nauk. 1861.
- Movses Kalankatuatsi (1984). Istoriia strany Aluank История страны Алуанк. Translated by Sh. V. Smbatian. Erevan: Matenadaran.

=== Georgian translation ===
- Movses K'alank'at'uatsi (1985). Alvanta kveq'nis ist'oria ალვანთა ქვეყნის ისტორია (PDF). Translated by L. Davlianidze-Tatishvili. Tbilisi: Metsniereba.

=== English translations ===
- Movsēs Dasxuranc̣i (1961). The History of the Caucasian Albanians. London Oriental Series, Vol. 8. Translated C. J. F. Dowsett. London: Oxford University Press.
- Movsēs Dasxuranc'i (2010). The History of the Aghuans. Sources of the Armenian Tradition. Translated by Robert Bedrosian. Long Branch, New Jersey.
