= The History of the Caucasian Albanians =

The History of the Caucasian Albanians (or The History of the Land of Aghvank; Armenian: Պատմութիւն Աղուանից աշխարհի) by Movses Kaghankatvatsi is a history of eastern territories of Armenia (Nagorno-Karabakh and Utik), as well as other territories in Southeastern Caucasus usually described as Caucasian Albania. The work was written in Old Armenian. It covers the 500-1100 AD period.

In the works of earlier Armenian authors, no name was attached to the work. Early in the 13th century, however, Mkhitar Gosh named Movses Dasxurants'i as the author. The earliest extant manuscript of The History, also of the 13th century (1289), bears no author's name; nor do other manuscripts. The earliest manuscript to bear the name of Movses Kalankatuaci is that copied by scribe Lunkianos in 1761. The date of the compilation known as The History is based on the fact that the last person to have a hand in The History wrote at the earliest at the end of the 11th or the beginning of the 12th century.

== Publications and translations ==
- Movses Kaghankatvatsi (1983). History of Aghuank in original Old-Armenian (Մովսէս Կաղանկատուացի.Պատմութիւն Աղուանից աշխարհի), critical text and introduction by Varag Arrakelian (in Armenian). Yerevan: "Matenadaran" Institute of old manuscripts after Mesrob Mashtots. Armenian SSR Academy of Sciences.
- Movsēs Dasxuranc'i (1961). The History of the Caucasian Albanians (translated by C. F. J. Dowsett). London: (London Oriental Series, Vol. 8).
- Movses Kaghankatvatsi (1984). The History of the Country of Aluank (translated by Š.V. Smbatian) (in Russian). Yerevan: Matenadaran.
- Movses Kaghankatvatsi (1985). The History of Albania (translated by L. Davlianidze-Tatishvili) (in Georgian). Tbilisi.
