= Israel (bishop of Caucasian Albania) =

Israel was the bishop of Caucasian Albania in the latter part of the 7th century. In 682, he led an unsuccessful delegation to convert Alp Iluetuer, the ruler of the North Caucasian Huns, to Christianity. Israel wrote about the customs of the Huns, including the local cult of Tengri.
