= Classical Armenian =

Oldest attested form of the Armenian language

- Old Armenian
- գրաբար
- Region: Armenian Highlands
- Era: developed into Middle Armenian
- Language family: Indo-European: Classical Armenian
- Early form: Proto-Armenian
- Writing system: Armenian alphabet (Classical Armenian orthography)

Language codes
- ISO 639-3: xcl
- Glottolog: clas1249
- Linguasphere: 57-AAA-aa

Classical Armenian (Armenian: գրաբար, romanized: grabar, Eastern Armenian pronunciation [ɡəɾɑˈpʰɑɾ], Western Armenian pronunciation [kʰəɾɑˈpʰɑɾ]; meaning "literary [language]"; also Old Armenian or Liturgical Armenian) is the oldest attested form of the Armenian language. It was first written down at the beginning of the 5th century, and most Armenian literature from then through the 18th century is in Classical Armenian. Many ancient manuscripts originally written in Ancient Greek, Hebrew, Syriac and Latin survive only in Armenian translation. Classical Armenian itself, in turn, was heavily influenced by the Iranian languages, in particular by Parthian.

Classical Armenian continues to be the liturgical language of the Armenian Apostolic Church and the Armenian Catholic Church and is often learned by Biblical, Intertestamental, and Patristic scholars dedicated to textual studies. Classical Armenian is also important for the reconstruction of the Proto-Indo-European language.

== Phonology ==
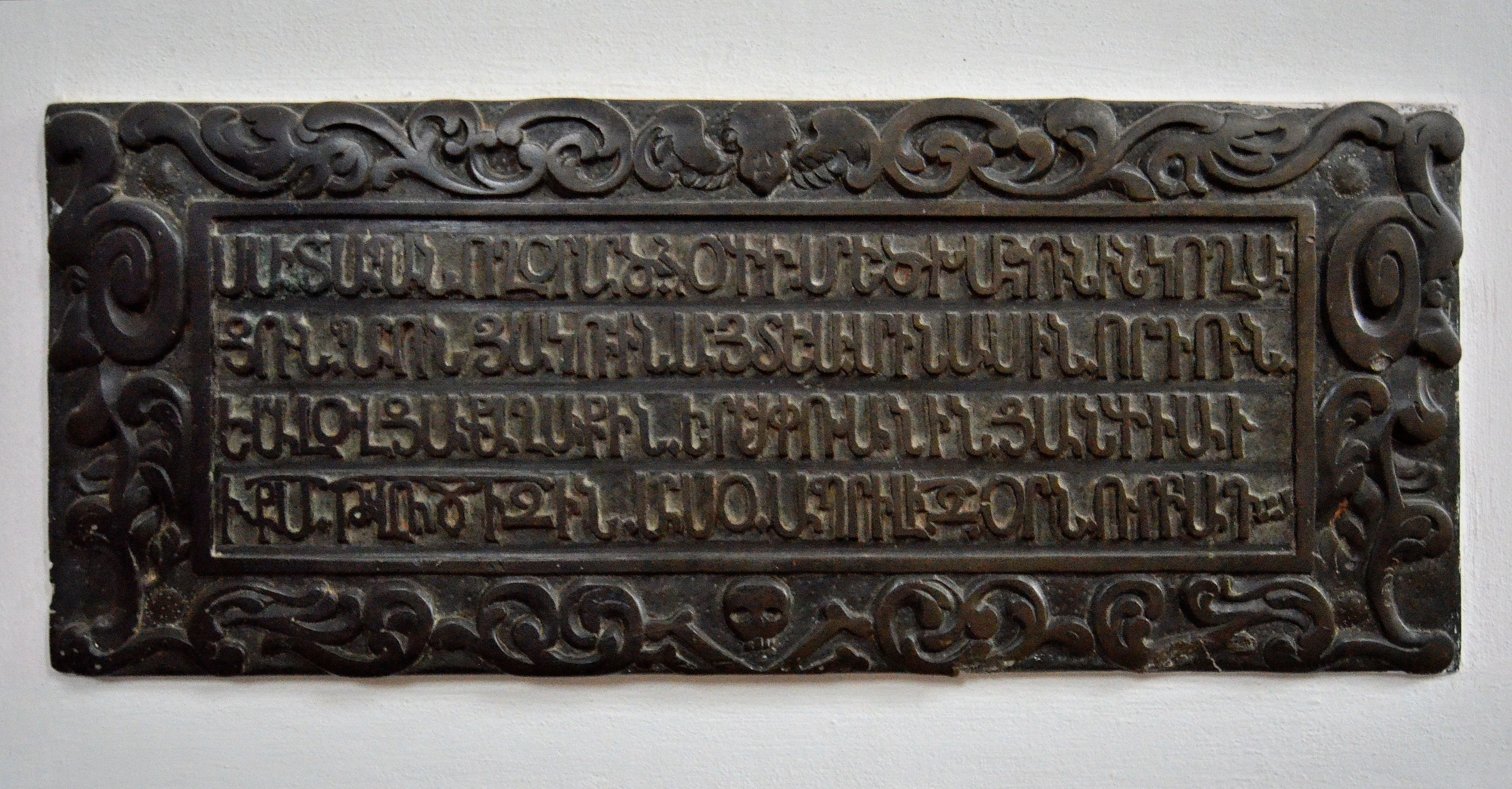
Epitaph in Classical Armenian for Jakub and Marianna Minasowicz at St. Hyacinth's Church in Warsaw

=== Vowels ===
There are seven monophthongs:

- /a/ ⟨Ա⟩, /i/ ⟨Ի⟩, /ə/ ⟨Ը⟩, /ɛ/ or open e ⟨Ե⟩, /e/ or closed e ⟨Է⟩, /o/ ⟨Ո⟩, and /u/ ⟨ՈՒ⟩ (transcribed as a, i, ə, e, ē, o, and u respectively). The vowel transcribed u is spelled using the Armenian letters for ow ⟨ՈՒ⟩, but it is not actually a diphthong.

There are also six traditional diphthongs:

- ay ⟨ԱՅ⟩, aw ⟨ԱՒ⟩ (later ⟨Օ⟩), ea ⟨ԵԱ⟩, ew ⟨ԵՒ⟩, iw ⟨ԻՒ⟩, oy ⟨ՈՅ⟩.

=== Consonants ===
In the following table is the Classical Armenian consonantal system. The stops and affricate consonants have, in addition to the more common voiced and unvoiced series, also a separate aspirated series, transcribed with the notation used for Ancient Greek rough breathing after the letter: p῾, t῾, c῾, č῾, k῾. Each phoneme has two symbols in the table. The left indicates the pronunciation in International Phonetic Alphabet (IPA); the right one is the corresponding symbol in the Armenian alphabet.

| | | Labial | Alveolar | | Palatal | Velar / Uvular | Glottal |
| | | Labial | plain | velar. | Palatal | Velar / Uvular | Glottal |
|---|---|---|---|---|---|---|---|
| Nasals | | /m/ Մ | /n/ Ն | | | | |
| Stops | voiced | /b/ Բ | /d/ Դ | | | /ɡ/ Գ | |
| Stops | unvoiced | /p/ Պ | /t/ Տ | | | /k/ Կ | |
| Stops | aspirated | /pʰ/ Փ | /tʰ/ Թ | | | /kʰ/ Ք | |
| Affricates | voiced | | /dz/ Ձ | | /dʒ/ Ջ | | |
| Affricates | unvoiced / ejective | | /ts/ Ծ | | /tʃ/ Ճ | | |
| Affricates | aspirated | | /tsʰ/ Ց | | /tʃʰ/ Չ | | |
| Fricatives | voiced | /v/ Վ | /z/ Զ | | /ʒ/ Ժ | | |
| Fricatives | unvoiced | /f/ Ֆ (Note: The letter f (or Ֆ) was introduced in the Medieval Period to represent the foreign sound /f/, the voiceless labiodental fricative; it was not originally a letter in the alphabet.) | /s/ Ս | | /ʃ/ Շ | /χ/ Խ | /h/ Հ |
| Approximants | lateral | | /l/ Լ | /ɫ/ Ղ | | | |
| Approximants | median | | /ɹ/ Ր | | /j/ Յ | | |
| Trill | | | /r/ Ռ | | | | |

== Numbers in Old Armenian ==
| Number | Old Armenian | PIE |
|---|---|---|
| One | մի (mi) | *sémih₂ < feminine of *sḗm ("one") |
| Two | երկու (erku) | *dwoy- < *dwóh₁ (the motives of the unusual developments are not fully understood) |
| Three | երեք (erekʻ) | *tréyes |
| Four | չորք (čʻorkʻ) քառ (kʻaṙ) | *kʷtwr̥(s?) < zero-grade of *kʷetwóres |
| Five | հինգ (hing) | *pénkʷe |
| Six | վեց (vecʻ) | *suwéḱs < *swéḱs |
| Seven | եօթն (eōtʻn) | *septḿ̥ |
| Eight | ութ (utʻ) < proto-Armenian *owtu | *(h₁)oḱtṓw |
| Nine | ինն (inn) < proto-Armenian *enun- | *h₁nuno- < zero-grade of *h₁néwn̥ |
| Ten | տասն (tasn) | *déḱm̥ |

== Personal pronouns in Old Armenian ==
| Pronoun | Old Armenian | PIE |
|---|---|---|
| I | ես (es) | *éǵh₂ |
| You | դու (du) | *túh₂ |
| He, she, it | նա (na) < *no- նոյն (noyn) < *no-ēn (adverbial suffix) | *h₁nós ("over there") *h₁nó-eyni- ("over there" +"that") |
| We | մեք (mekʻ) < *mes | *wéy |
| You (all) | դուք (dukʻ) | *túh₂ with pluralization suffix -k' |
| They | նոքա (nokʻa) | *h₁nós +pluralization suffix |

The pluralization suffix -k', which since Old Armenian was used form the nominative plural, could be linked to the final -s in PIE *tréyes > Old Armenian երեք (erekʻ) and չորք (čʻorkʻ), which then can point to a pre-Armenian *kʷtwr̥s (< *kʷetwóres). Otherwise, it derives from the number "two", երկու (erku) and was originally used as a mark for the dual number.

There are no dual prefixes or dual plurals in Old Armenian.

== Two examples of verbs in Old Armenian ==
բերել (berel, "to bear")
| Pronoun | Old Armenian | PIE |
|---|---|---|
| I | բերեմ (berem) | *bʰéroh₂ |
| You | բերես (beres) | *bʰéresi |
| He, she, it | բերէ (berē) | *bʰéreti |
| We | բերեմք (beremkʻ) | *bʰéromos |
| You (all) | բերէք (berēkʻ) | *bʰérete |
| They | բերեն (beren) | *bʰéronti |

կարդալ (kardal, "to read")
| Pronoun | Old Armenian | PIE |
|---|---|---|
| I | կարդամ (kardam) | *gʷr̥Hdʰh₁oh₂ |
| You | կարդաս (kardas) | *gʷr̥Hdʰh₁ési |
| He, she, it | կարդայ (karday) | *gʷr̥Hdʰh₁éti |
| We | կարդամք (kardamkʻ) | *gʷr̥Hdʰh₁omos |
| You (all) | կարդայք (kardaykʻ) | *gʷr̥Hdʰh₁éte |
| They | կարդան (kardan) | *gʷr̥Hdʰh₁onti |

The pluralization suffix -k' can again be seen in the forms of the first and second person plural. The first person suffix -em comes from the PIE suffix in athematic verbs *-mi.

== An example of noun in Old Armenian ==
Nouns in Old Armenian can belong to three models of declinations: o-type, i-type and i-a-type. Nouns can show more than one model of conjugation and retain all cases from PIE except for the vocative, which merged with the nominative and the accusative. All the strong cases lost their suffix in the singular; by contrast, almost every weak case in the singular keep a suffix. The cases are: nominative, genitive, dative, accusative, ablative, locative and instrumental. The o-type model shows an extremely simplified paradigm with many instances of syncretism and the constant use of the pluralization suffix -k' in the plural; not only do strong cases tend to converge in the singular, but most of the weak cases converge into -oy, perhaps from the PIE dative *-oey. There is no suffix for the dual number.

արտ (art, "field"), o-type
| Case | Old Armenian (singular) | Old Armenian (plural) |
|---|---|---|
| Nominative | արտ (art) < PIE *h₂éǵros | արտք (artkʻ) < PIE *h₂éǵroes |
| Genitive | արտոյ (artoy) < *h₂éǵroey? | արտոց (artocʻ) < *h₂éǵroHom |
| Dative | արտոյ (artoy) < *h₂éǵroey | արտոց (artocʻ) < *h₂éǵromos |
| Accusative | արտ (art) < *h₂éǵrom | արտս (arts) < *h₂éǵroms |
| Ablative | արտոյ (artoy) < *h₂éǵroey? | արտոց (artocʻ) < *h₂éǵromos |
| Locative | արտ (art) < *h₂éǵrey/oy | արտս (arts) < *h₂éǵroysu |
| Instrumental | արտով (artov) < *h₂éǵroh₁ | արտովք (artovkʻ) < *h₂éǵrōys |

== An example of adjective in Old Armenian ==
Adjectives in Old Armenian have at least two models of declension: i-a-type and i-type. An adjective, provided that it is not indeclinable, can show both models. Most of the declension show a great deal of syncretism and the plural shows again the pluralization suffix -k'. The instrumental plural has two possible forms.

երկար (erkar, "long")
| Case | Old Armenian (singular) | Old Armenian (plural) |
|---|---|---|
| Nom. | երկար (erkar) < PIE *dweh₂rós | երկարք (erkarkʻ) < PIE *dweh₂róes |
| Gen. | երկարի (erkari) < *dweh₂rósyo? | երկարաց (erkaracʻ) < *dweh₂róHom |
| Dat. | երկարի (erkari) < *dweh₂róey | երկարաց (erkaracʻ) < *dweh₂rómos |
| Acc. | երկար (erkar) < *dweh₂róm | երկարս (erkars) < *dweh₂róms |
| Abl. | երկարէ (erkarē) < *dweh₂réad | երկարաց (erkaracʻ) < *dweh₂rómos |
| Loc. | երկարի (erkari) < *dweh₂réy/óy | երկարաւք (erkarawkʻ) < *dweh₂róysu երկարօք (erkarōkʻ) < *dweh₂róysu |
| Instr. | երկարաւ (erkaraw) < *dweh₂róh₁ | երկարս (erkars) < *dweh₂rṓys |

The adjective "long" shows the same sound changes of the numeral "two": PIE *dweh₂rós / *dwoy- > erkar / erku.

== See also ==
- List of Armenian writers
- Proto-Armenian language
- Armenian alphabet

== Bibliography ==
- Adjarian, Hrachia. (1971–9) Etymological Root Dictionary of the Armenian Language. Vol. I – IV. Yerevan: Yerevan State University.
- Godel, Robert. (1975) An Introduction to the Study of Classical Armenian. Wiesbaden: Dr. Ludwig Reichert Verlag (ISBN 9783920153377)
- Meillet, Antoine. (1903) Esquisse d'une grammaire comparée de l'arménien classique [Outline of a comparative grammar of classical Armenian].
- Schmitt, Rüdiger. (1981) Grammatik des Klassisch-Armenischen mit sprachlichen Erläuterungen [Grammar of Classical Armenian with linguistic explications]. (1981, second edition 2007).
- Thomson, Robert W. (1989) An Introduction to Classical Armenian. Caravan Books. (ISBN 0-88206-072-4)
