= Arran (Caucasus) =

Region located in modern-day Azerbaijan, historically in Iran

Coordinates: 40°04′26″N 46°24′46″E

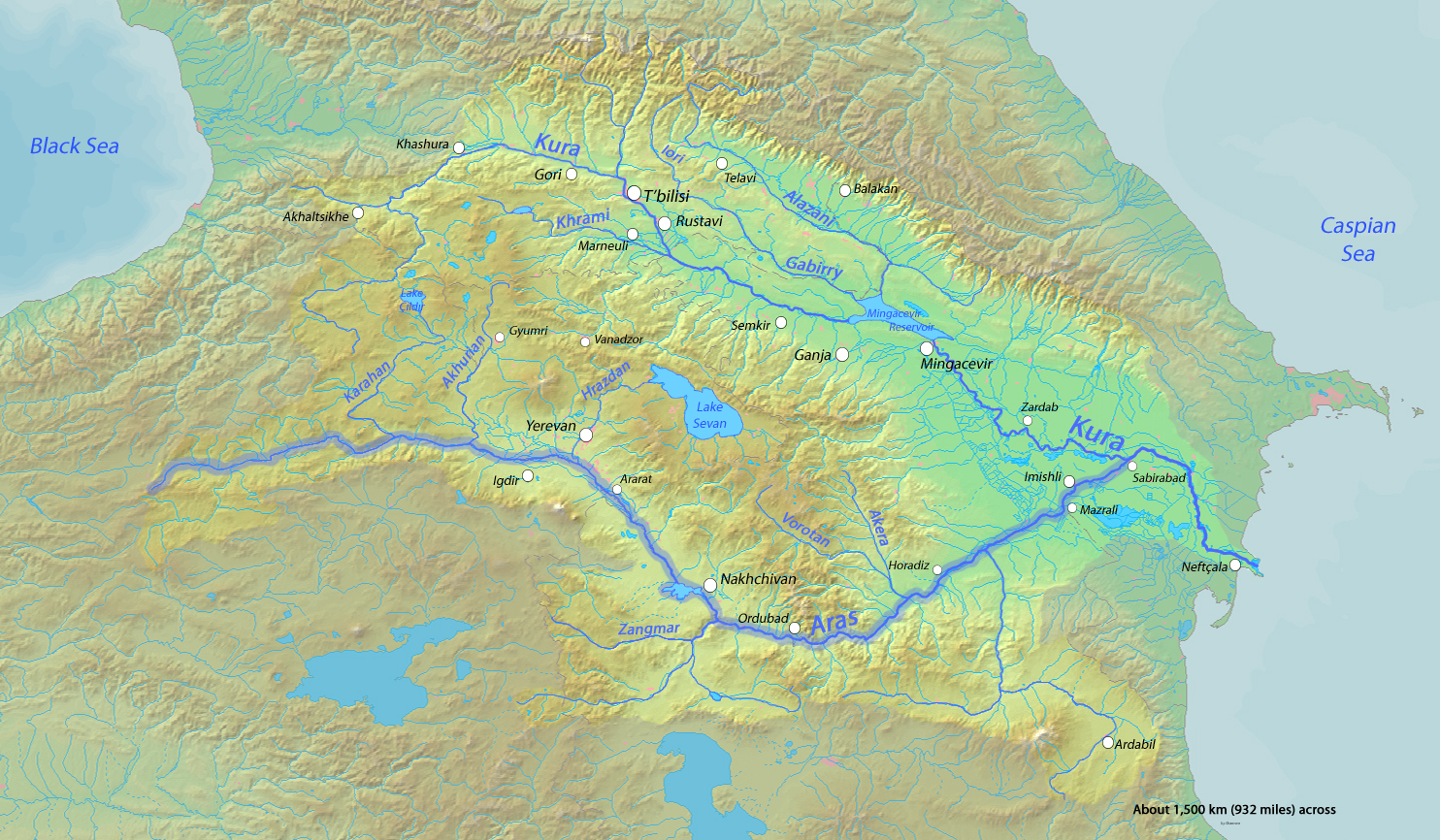
Aras and Kura river map

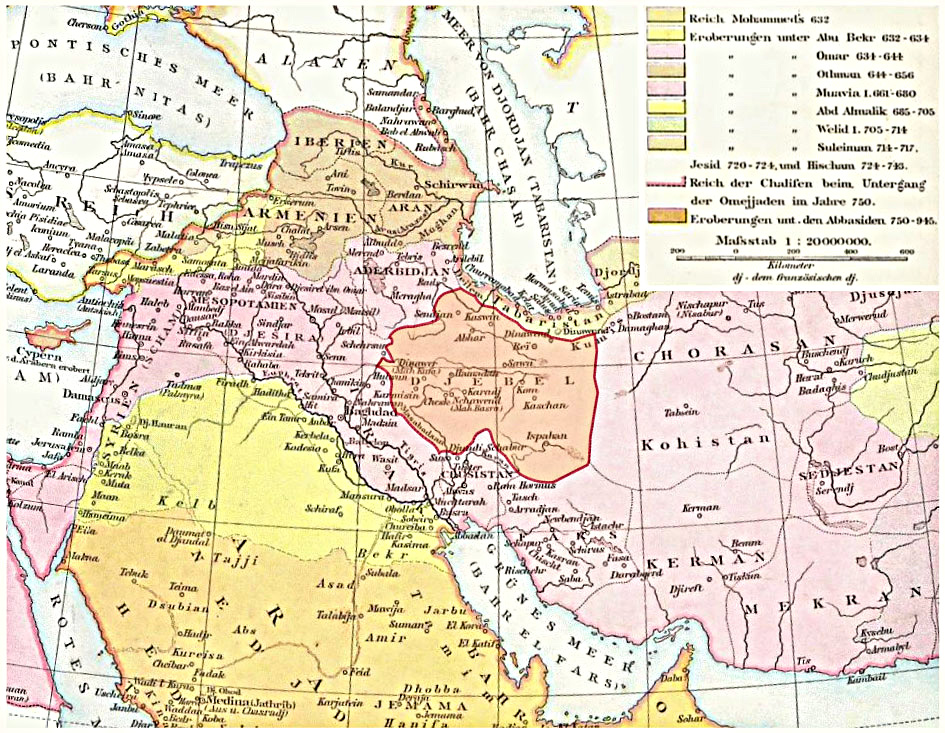
Arran is located to the west of the Caspian Sea.

Arrān (Middle Persian form; New Persian: اران) is an Iranian toponym which in ancient times referred to the country of Caucasian Albania, which was originally located north of the Kura River but later expanded to territories south of the river as well. In the post-Islamic period, Arran came to signify only the region which lay within the triangle of land, lowland in the east and mountainous in the west, formed by the junction of the Kura and Aras rivers.

The Caucasian Albanian kingdom, which emerged in the 1st century BC, was subject to Sasanian Iran from the 3rd century AD. After 387, Albania expanded its territory across the Kura at Armenia's expense, now encompassing a territory roughly corresponding to that of the modern-day Republic of Azerbaijan. The Sasanians abolished the local monarchy c. 510 AD. After the Islamic conquests, the local princes of Albania continued their existence under caliphal authority, although they became increasingly fragmented over time. Independent Muslim emirates emerged along the Caspian coast after the waning of caliphal power in 9th century; but these did not claim Arran in their titles, and the term Arran came to designate the smaller area between the Kura and Aras rivers.

Albania converted to Christianity between the early 4th and early 5th centuries. Islam spread to the region after the Islamic conquests; the eastern lands of Albania, along the Caspian, appear to have converted earlier, corresponding to the shift of the definition of Albania/Arran in the 10th century. Christians still formed a majority in Arran in the 10th century. The process of Islamization was completed by the Turkic and Mongol invasions in the 11th–13th centuries; this was accompanied by the region's Turkification. The population of Arran which remained Christian was ultimately absorbed by the Armenians and in part by the Georgians; north of the Kura, in historical Caucasian Albania proper, the Udi people maintained their Christian faith and a language which is either directly descended from or closely related to the Caucasian Albanian language. The term Arran had fallen out of common use by the 15th century; the region was associated with Azerbaijan, and the land between the Kura and Aras rivers came to be known as Karabakh.

Today, the term Aran is mainly used in Azerbaijan to indicate territories consisting of Mil and Mughan plains (mostly, Beylagan, Imishli, Kurdamir, Saatly, Sabirabad provinces of the Republic of Azerbaijan). It has also been used by Iranian historian Enayatollah Reza to refer to the country of Azerbaijan, freeing the name "Azerbaijan" to refer to a region within Iran.

== Name ==
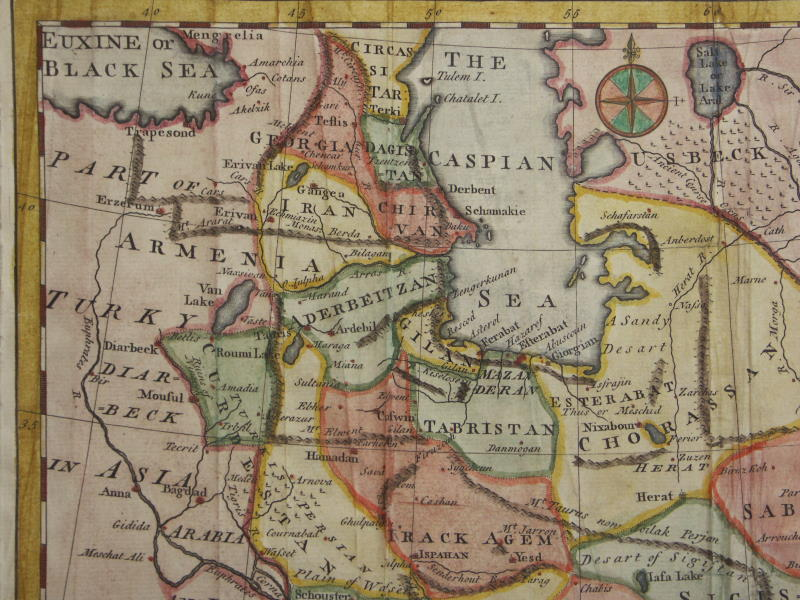
An old map that shows the name of Iran in the area of Aran.

A(r)rān was the Middle Persian name of the region known to Greek and Roman authors as Albani(a) (whence the modern English term Caucasian Albania). It is probable that the Greco-Roman name and the Armenian term Ałuank or Aghvank (Աղուանք) both derive from an Iranian name for the region. In Parthian the region was known as Ardān, which suggests an unattested earlier form *aldwān that could have yielded *alban- / *alwan- and Middle Persian A(r)rān. The Middle Persian name was adopted into Arabic as al-Rān, (Note: Per Jasmine Dum-Tragut and Jost Gippet, the Arabic name is a metanalysis of the Middle Persian A(r)rān, as if the first syllable is the Arabic definite article al-. C. E. Bosworth states that the Arabic term is adopted from Georgian Rani, not the other way around.) from which derives Georgian Rani (რანი). (Note: Another Georgian name for Albania, Her-eti (from her-ni 'Albanians'), is of unclear origin.) The native name of the region is unknown, but it was likely a variant of Ran.

According to the 10th-century Armenian history attributed to Movses Kaghankatvatsi, Arran was the name of the legendary founder of Caucasian Albania, who in some versions was the son of Noah's son Yafet (Japheth) and also, possibly the eponym of the ancient Caucasian Albanians (Aghvan), and/or the Iranian tribe known as Alans (Alani). The nearby Araks (Aras) river was known to Ancient Greek geographers as the Araxes, and has a source near Mount Ararat. James Darmesteter, in his discussion of the geography of the Avesta's Vendidad I, observes that the 12th century Bundahishn (29:12) identified the "Airyana Vaego by the Vanguhi Daitya" on the northern border of Azerbaijan, and did so "probably in order that it should be as near as possible to the seat of the Zoroastrian religion yet without losing its supernatural character by the counter-evidence of facts." Darmesteter further associated the Vanguhi Daitya river with the Araxes, and compared the name "Airyana Vaego" with that of Arran. In some Classical authors one finds the form Arian/Aryan.

== Boundaries ==
In pre-Islamic times, Arran referred to a larger region than it did in Islamic times, covering all of eastern Transcaucasia and roughly corresponding to the territory of the modern-day Republic of Azerbaijan. (Note: More specifically, it was in the late 4th century AD that country of Caucasian Albania (Aran) incorporated the region between the Kura and Aras rivers into its territory after assisting Sasanian Iran against Armenia. For several centuries prior, the region between the rivers had been provinces of Armenia, namely Artsakh, Utik, Gardman, and Koght. According to Marie Louise Chaumont, in ancient times the frontier between Armenia and Albania along the Kura was not a stable one and was overrun several times by both sides.) However, in post-Islamic times the geographic notion of Arran shrank to the territory between the Kura and Aras rivers.

A medieval chronicle, the Ajayib-ad-Dunya, written in the 13th century by an unknown author, says Arran was 30 parasangs (200 km) in width, and 40 farsakhs (270 km) in length. The entire right bank of the Kura river until it joined with the Aras was attributed to Arran (the left bank of the Kura was known as Shirvan). The boundaries of Arran have shifted throughout history, sometimes encompassing the entire territory of the present-day Republic of Azerbaijan, and at other times only parts of the South Caucasus. Sometimes Arran was part of Armenia.

Medieval Islamic geographers gave descriptions of Arran in general, and of its towns, including Barda, Beylagan, and Ganja.

== History ==
=== Pre-Islamic ===
Caucasian Albania in the 5th and 6th centuries AD

In ancient times, Arran was the Iranian name for Caucasian Albania, a country which was originally located north of the Kura and expanded across the river at the expense of Armenia after 387 AD. A kingdom of Caucasian Albania emerged in the early 1st century BC. The Greek author Strabo (died 1st century AD) reports that Caucasian Albania consisted of 26 tribes with their own languages. It is supposed that most of the tribes were speakers of Lezgic languages, a branch of the Northeast Caucasian languages; however, there were also Iranian and Kartvelian-speaking tribes among them.

A branch of the Parthian Arsacid dynasty came to power in Albania in either the 1st or the 4th century, displacing an earlier dynasty called Aranshahik. The kings of Albania were subject to Sasanian Iran from the 3rd century AD. Within the larger Iranian sphere of influence, Albania was particularly influenced by neighboring Armenia; it was converted to Christianity through Armenian missionary activity between the early 4th and early 5th centuries. After 387, Albania expanded its territory across the Kura at Armenia's expense, acquiring the Armenian districts of Artsakh, Utik, Gardman, and Koght. While allowing Albania to expand across the Kura, the Sasanians established more direct control over the coastal regions of Albania, from the mouth of the Kura to Darband. A Persian marzpan (governor-general) was placed in the old capital of Kabala while the Albanian kings moved to Partaw (or Partav; modern-day Barda), a new capital south of the Kura, in the 5th century.

The Albanians joined forces with the Armenians and Georgians to rebel against the Sasanians when Yazdegerd II attempted to force their conversion to Zoroastrianism; although the Christian forces were defeated at the Battle of Avarayr (451), the Sasanians ultimately allowed the Caucasian Christians to preserve their faith. The Sasanians abolished the local monarchy c. 510 after the death of King Vachagan the Pious. Another family of Parthian origin, the Mihranids, emerged as princes of Albania (Arranshahs). Their progenitor, Mihran, is said to have received the district of Gardman from the Sasanian king Khosrow (most likely Khosrow II). The Mihranid prince Juansher initially fought on the side of the Sasanians during the Arab invasions but later went to Damascus and allied with Mu'awiya, the Umayyad governor of Syria and future caliph.

=== Islamic ===
Banner of Arran (Rani) according to Vakhushti

The Arab conquest of Arran occurred in stages and focused on Partaw (Bardha'a in Arabic) from about 645. After the Mihranids accepted caliphal rule, the regions north of the Kura, notably Shamkur, Shakki, and Kabala, were captured. Following the Second Fitna (the Muslim civil war, c. 680–692), the Umayyads sent governors to rule over Armenia and Arran together. Bardha'a then became a military outpost for the caliphate in its wars with the Khazars. Despite the presence of Muslim garrisons in Bardha'a and other urban centers, caliphal rule was "of necessity light and often uncertain" because of the region's frontier status. The local princes, led by the Mihranids, were left in place and paid tribute to the caliphate. According to the history of Albania attributed to Movses Kaghankatvatsi, the caliph Abd al-Malik ibn Marwan (685–705) recognized the primacy of the Armenian Church over the Albanian Church.

Under the Abbasids, Arran was struck by several military conflicts. The Khazars continued their raids, as did the Tsanars (Sanariyya in Arabic), a people from present-day eastern Georgia; the caliph's governors relied on the Albanian cavalry to repel these attacks. In 822, the prince of Arran, Varaz-Trdat, was assassinated, ending the male line of the Mihranid dynasty. This was followed by the primacy of Sahl Smbatean (Sahl ibn Sunbat), the lord of Shakki, (Note: Scholarly opinions on Sahl's origins vary greatly. He has variously been described as a Syunid, a Mihranid of a different branch than the former presiding princes, and an Aranshahik. Some scholars doubt his association with Shakki, considering it a textual corruption of Khachen.) who revolted against caliphal rule and defeated Arab armies on more than one occasion. After Sahl handed over the Iranian rebel Babak Khorramdin, the Abbasids reportedly exempted him from paying tribute and presented him with gifts; per Charles Dowsett, this was effectively an official investiture of Sahl as ruler of Arran. Sahl's son and successor Atrnerseh married the daughter of the last Mihranid prince, and he and his descendants strove to recover the old Albanian lands formally inherited through this marriage. In all, six different noble houses claimed at point or another the title of "king of Albania", which implied overlordship over the Christian population on both sides of the Kura. (Note: Hewsen calls these principalities claiming the title of Albania "pseudo-Albania States"; these were Shakki-Hereti; Tashir-Dzoraget/Lori-Tashir; Kakheti-Hereti; Parisos; Khachen; and Utik-Dizak.)

During the campaign of the Abbasid general Bugha al-Kabir (died 862) in the Caucasus, the provinces of Arran resisted separately but did not form a united front, which shows the continued political fragmentation of the region. After Bugha's campaign, many Albanian princes were deported to the Abbasid capital of Samarra. Political fragmentation increased further after the death of Caliph al-Mutawakkil in 861, which marked the collapse of the Abbasid claim to rule Arran. The lands along the Caspian coast came under the control of independent emirs, such as the Sulami emirs of Darband and the Shirvanshahs. In the 10th century, Arabic geographers still included these territories within Arran, but the emirs themselves did not claim rulership over Arran. The term Arran/Albania came to denote the districts of Utik and Artsakh, south of the Kura and north of the Aras. The princes of the region ruled independently while recognizing the claims of the emirs of Azerbaijan, especially the Sallarids. As a result of the Caspian expeditions of the Rus, Bardha'a was sacked in 943. It never fully recovered and was replaced by Baylaqan as the capital of Arran. In 1008, the Bagrationi kings of Georgia annexed Shakki and Hereti, north of the Kura, after which the kings of Kakheti in eastern Georgia claimed Albania among their titles. In the 11th century, the Bagratuni kings of Armenia and the emirs of Azerbaijan divided Arran south of the Kura.

Later in the eleventh century, a few rulers claimed Arran as one of their titles. The Shaddadid emirs of Ganja were called "rulers of Arran and some of Armenia" (hukkam Aran wa-ba'd Arminiyya). The Shaddadids lost their realm to the Seljuk Turks in 1075–76, which was followed by the extensive Turkification of Arran; this process advanced further after the Mongol conquests. In 1221, Baylaqan was sacked by the Mongols, after which Ganja gained importance. The name Arran continued to be used in Arabic and Persian sources. Historians name Arran as one of the regions subject to the Mongol khan Hulegu. In the first half of the 14th century, coins were minted with the name Arran under the Ilkhanate. The term Arran was no longer in common use by the 15th century, as the region was associated with Azerbaijan, and the land between the Kura and Aras rivers came to be known as Karabakh. According to C. E. Bosworth, "the history and fortunes of the region now merge into those of Azarbaijan." The Armenian princes of Khachen (known as the meliks of Artsakh, later Karabakh) maintained their claim to Albania (Armenian Aghvank) into the 18th century, and the Church of Albania survived as a catholicosate within the Armenian Church until 1828.

== People, language and religion ==
The population of Arran consisted of a great variety of peoples. Albania proper, located north of the Kura river, is supposed to have been populated mainly by speakers of Lezgic languages, along with some Iranian and Kartvelian-speaking tribes. Greek, Roman and Armenian authors provide the names of some peoples who inhabited the lands between the Kura and Aras rivers:

- Utians and Mycians — apparently migrants from the south, although their placement in the Caucasus is not universally accepted; (Note: See Utik#Population for different views on the historical population of Utik and the identity of the ancient Utians.)
- Caspians, Gargarians and the people of Gardman;
- Sakasenians — of Scythian origin;
- Gelians, Sodians, Lupenians, Balasanians — possibly Caucasian tribes;
- Parsians and Parrasians — probably Iranian.

The lands between the Kura and Aras which passed to Caucasian Albania in the 4th century were inhabited by Armenians and Armenicized aborigines, though many of the latter were still cited as distinct ethnic entities. The acquisition of these Armenian districts, as well as the transfer of the capital to Partaw south of the Kura in the 5th century, influenced the development of the culture of Albania/Arran. The Christian culture which developed in Albania after this time has been described as "essentially Armenian". At the beginning of the 5th century, a Caucasian Albanian alphabet was created to write in the Caucasian Albanian language (one of the Lezgic languages of Albania—probably the ancestor of the Udi language), which became the official language of the Albanian Church. However, Caucasian Albanian does not appear to have found broad acceptance as the common language of the Albanian tribes, and from the beginning it shared its official status in the Church with Armenian. It ultimately lost its official status within the Church and fell into disuse as a written language. According to historian Aleksan Hakobyan, the dominance of Armenian as a written language, along with the influence of Georgian and the Georgian Church in the western regions of Albania proper, ended the process of ethnic consolidation among the various peoples of Albania and later led to the Armenization and Georgianization of part of the population. The only extant history of Albania, the history attributed to Movses Kaghankatvatsi or Daskhurantsi, was written in Armenian, although, according to Alison Vacca, it "does offer a distinctly Albanian perspective." (Note: According to Aleksan Hakobyan, the history of Movses Kaghankatvatsi is really a history of the Armenians of Artsakh and Utik (which, in his view, were wholly Armenian since at least the 4th century BC); however, Kaghankatvatsi identifies those Armenians as Albanians (Ałuank), reflecting the centrifugal tendencies of the local Armenian princes against the Bagratuni kings of Armenia. This process of ethnic separation was ended by the invasion of the Seljuks and the weakening of the Armenian nobility.) Middle Persian was also used in Sasanian-era Albania in both political and ecclesiastical administration.

In pre-Islamic times the population of Arran and most of Caucasian Albania had mostly converted to Christianity, although the new faith was met with lasting opposition from the local tribes and also had to compete with the Zoroastrianism promoted by the Sasanians. Under Arab rule (7th to 9th centuries) a part of the population adopted Islam, and Arabs settled in some areas, particularly in the lowlands. Kurds also settled in the lowlands, and their language and customs spread under the rule of the Kurdish Shaddadids, who were based in Ganja. As in the rest of the Caucasus, intermarriage between Christians and Muslims was common. The eastern lands of Albania, along the Caspian, appear to have converted earlier, corresponding to the shift of the definition of Albania/Arran in the 10th century. Christians still formed a majority in Arran in the 10th century. Arabic geographies of the 10th century report that the people of Bardha'a spoke spoke al-rānīya (i.e. 'Arranian' or 'Albanian'), which modern scholars connect with the Caucasian Albanian language thought to be the ancestor of Udi. (Note: C. E. Bosworth, on the other hand, writes that it is "presumably Iranian".) Arabic sources also tell of the presence of both Arabic and Persian in Albania/Arran, although Armenian was the more widespread language. The urban population of Ganja, one of the major cities of Arran, spoke mainly in Persian. One of the most famous Persian poets, Nizami Ganjavi, was born in Ganja in the 12th century. North of the Kura, part of the Persian-speaking Muslim population ethnically consolidated in the state of the Shirvanshahs; their descendants are the modern Tat people. (Note: Tradition holds that the Tats are descended from Sasanian-era military colonists.)

Isolated groups of Turkic peoples had appeared in the South Caucasus repeatedly from the start of the 7th century, but it was only in the 11th and 12th centuries that large-scale settlement began. The Turkification of Arran began under the Seljuks and continued after the Mongol conquests. The process was most rapid in the lowlands. The Turkic-speaking Muslims of the South Caucasus and northern Iran became known as Azerbaijanis in modern times. The population of Arran which remained Christian was ultimately absorbed by the Armenians and in part by the Georgians. North of the Kura, in historical Albania proper, the Udi people maintained their Christian faith and speak a Lezgic language which is either directly descended from or closely related to the Caucasian Albanian language. In historian Aleksan Hakobyan's view, the emergence of the Udis as an group can be traced to the "ethnic consolidation of the Christian part of the Albanian tribal population" in the Kingdom of Hereti in approximately the late 9th century.

== See also ==
- South Caucasus
- Transcaucasia
- Azerbaijan Democratic Republic
- Azerbaijan SSR
- Iranian Azerbaijan
- Iranian plateau
