= Varaz-Tiridates II =

- King of Caucasian Albania
- Reign: 800 — 812/822
- Predecessor: Stephanos I
- Issue: Stephanos II, Sparama wife of Atrnerseh
- Dynasty: Mihranids
- Father: Stephanos I
- Religion: Church of Caucasian Albania

Varaz-Trdat II was the last Mihranid king of Caucasian Albania from 800 to 812/822 and the son of the previous ruler Stephanos I.

== Life ==
After the death of his father in 800, he becomes the new ruler of the Gardman region and the northern part of Caucasian Albania. He continued to rely on an alliance with the Khazar Khaganate, which controlled the Derbent region. In alliance with the Khazars and Armenian princes he opposed the Caliphate.

Movses Kaghankatvatsi in the History of the Caucasian Albanians reports that he was killed and describes the incident: "In the same year the lord Nerseh i Pʻiłippean slew Varaz-Trdat and slaughtered his son on his mother's breast, stealing all his possessions. This Varaz-Trdat was of the Mihrakan family which inherited Albania from father to son. He was the eighth ruler after Varaz-Grigor, the first prince of Albania".

Varaz-Tiridates’ widow, however, succeeded in fleeing to Artsalkh with her daughter Sparama and there arranged a marriage between this daughter and Atrnerseh, prince of Khatchen, son of Sahl ibn Sunbat. Thus, Gardman was united with the principality of Khachen.
