= Varaz Grigor =

King of Caucasian Albania from 628 to c. 654

King of Caucasian Albania
- Reign: 628 – 638 (sole monarch); 638 – 654 (with Javanshir)
- Predecessor: Gayšak (as marzban)
- Successor: Javanshir

Prince of Gardman
- Reign: c. 600 - 628
- Predecessor: Vard II
- Born: c. 585
- Died: c. 654 (aged 68–69)
- Consort: Goridukht
- Dynasty: Mihranids
- Father: Vard II
- Religion: Zoroastrianism (before 628); Albanian Apostolic (after 628)

Varaz Grigor (Armenian: Գրիգոր Վարազ, lit. 'Grigor the Boar') was the first known Mihranid king of Caucasian Albania from 628 until at least 654. The last holder of the title was Vachagan III.

== Before reign ==
Although mentioned in The History of the Country of Albania numerously, almost nothing prior to his reign is known. He was son of Vard II, the Prince of Gardman and had a sister called Shushik. He succeeded his father c. 600 before his accession to the throne of Albania in 628. Like other Gardman rulers, he was of the Mihranid stock and according to Movses Kaghankatvatsi he was baptized by Catholicos Viro. Cyril Toumanoff believes that it was simply a rebaptism from monophysite doctrine to Chalcedonian doctrine. According to Constantin Zuckerman, however, his Zoroastrian name may have been Gadvšnasp prior to his conversion to Christianity, and he used the opportunity to become the ruler of the kingdom.

== Reign ==
He rose to prominence during Byzantine–Sasanian War of 602–628, gaining the trust of Byzantine emperor Heraclius and being crowned king of Caucasian Albania in 628, following Sassanid marzban Gayšak's departure from Partav. However, he didn't have full control over lands of Caucasian Albania, for example, Albanian lands in north of Kura was ruled by Göktürk prince Böri Shad. A mediation by Viro didn't help. He sent his second son Javanshir to Rostam Farrokhzad, who would take him to Ctesiphon before Yazdegerd III and fight at the Battle of al-Qadisiyyah in 636.

== After 638 ==
According to Toumanoff, he was deposed by Yazdegerd III while he was alive and replaced by his son in 638. According to Kaghankatvatsi, Grigor lived well after 638 and met with Javanshir in his old age; he also mentions Javanshir as spahbed that is being military leader. Thus, he may have co-reigned or restricted to be figurehead during reign of his son. He resided in Partav during his final years and was captured by Sassanid army in 639 alongside his other sons. This prompted Javanshir to ally with Adarnase I of Iberia and Aruičans, a princely family of Syunik. However, Javanshir managed to free them later. Varaz Grigor, following Theodore Rshtuni, submitted to Muawiyah in 651, however Javanshir preferred an alliance with Constans II and joined forces with Mousegh IV Mamikonien instead, in 654. Varaz Grigor disappears from the sources after this, only to be mentioned in Chapter 25 of Book Two in The History of the Country of Albania, as a part of Javanshir's prayer in 663-664.

== Family ==
He was married to Goridukht, an Iberian princess descended from Vakhtang Gorgasali and had 5 issues:

- Varaz Peroz (d. c. 670)
  - Varaz Tiridates I (r. 680-705)
- Javanshir
- Yezud Khosrov
- Varazman (b. c. 615)
  1. Varaz Tiridates - Prince of Gardman (d. 704)
    1. Stepannos
    2. Varazman
    3. Juansherik
    4. Vardanouhi - m. Varazoy, her cousin.
  2. Vakhtang
    1. Varazoy - m. Vardanouhi, his cousin.
- Helen (d. 670) - married to Grigor I Mamikonian (r. 662 – 685)

== Sources ==
- Zuckerman, Constantin (2020). "The Caucasus between Byzantium and the Caliphate (9th-10th c.)". In Hoyland, Robert (ed.). From Albania to Arrān: The East Caucasus between the Ancient and Islamic Worlds (ca. 330 BCE–1000 CE). Gorgias Press. pp. 149–191. doi:10.31826/9781463239893. ISBN 978-1463239886. S2CID 241889781.
