= Stephanos I =

- King of Caucasian Albania
- Reign: 770 — 800
- Predecessor: Gagikh II
- Successor: Varaz Trdat II
- Issue: Varaz Trdat II
- Dynasty: Mihranids
- Father: Gagikh II
- Religion: Church of Caucasian Albania

Stephanos I (d. 800) was the Mihranid king of Caucasian Albania from 770 to 800 and the son of the previous ruler Gagikh II.

After the death of his father in 770, he becomes the ruler of the Gardman region. However, he continued the struggle against the Caliphate and in this he relied on an alliance with the Khazar Khaganate. Gradually managed to restore power over the northern (piedmont) Caucasian Albania.

At the same time, in the south the Arabs finally strengthened due to the resettlement of Muslims here. Here the caliphate province of Arminiya (Arran) was completely formed. Stepanos I accepted Christian Albanians who moved to the north. Probably in 797 he contributed to the Khazars in the capture of Derbent and the liquidation of the Derbent Emirate. Hе died in 800 and was succeeded by his son Varaz Trdat II.
