= Sparama =

7th-century regent

Sparama (also called Spram) (fl. late 7th century CE) was the queen consort of the Mihranid king Varaz-Tiridates I of Caucasian Albania. She served as regent during the absence of her spouse in 694-699.

Her origin is unknown. She married Varaz-Tiridates I. She became the mother of Gagik, Vardan II and Stepannos I.

Her spouse was kept prisoner at Constantinople from 694 until 699. In his absence, his queen Sparama served as regent in his place during his absence, her sons being minors. The same year, in 694, prince Shero took power over the regency. She reportedly allied with him. However, the two regents soon came involved in a conflict. Their conflict destabilized the realm, which was exposed to Byzantine influence as well as Arabian attacks.

In 699, her spouse returned. Her son abdicated after his return. She is known to have still been alive in this year.
