= Vardan II =

- King of Caucasian Albania
- Reign: 705–711
- Predecessor: Shiruye
- Successor: Narseh
- Born: Unknown
- Died: 711
- Burial: Gardman castle
- Issue: Narseh
- Dynasty: Mihranids
- Father: Varaz-Tiridates I
- Mother: Sparama
- Religion: Church of Caucasian Albania

Vardan II (died 711), was the Mihranid king of Caucasian Albania from 705 to 711 (together with brother Gagik I).

Son of king Varaz Trdat I and Sparama. In 694, the latter declared Vardan together with his brother Gagik rulers. In the same year, he was captured by the Byzantine emperor Justinian II. Soon his mother Sparama along with usurpator Shero seized power. In 695, Vardan and his brother were sent to Constantinople, where they stayed until 699.

In 699, together with his father and brother, he managed to return to Caucasian Albania, where Varaz Trdat I helped in the fight against the attacks of the Arabs.

In 705, after the death of his father he shared power with his brother Gagik I, but could not confirm the royal title. Since 708, in alliance with Byzantine empire he fought against the Umayyad Caliphate.

In 711, together with Gagik I he died in one of the battles, but according to other sources, he died as a result of an epidemic. The power was given to his son Narseh.
