= Artsakh (historical province) =

Province in Armenia from 189BC to 387AD

Coordinates: 40°04′N 46°56′E

Artsakh Արցախ
- Province of Kingdom of Armenia
- c. 189 BC–387 AD
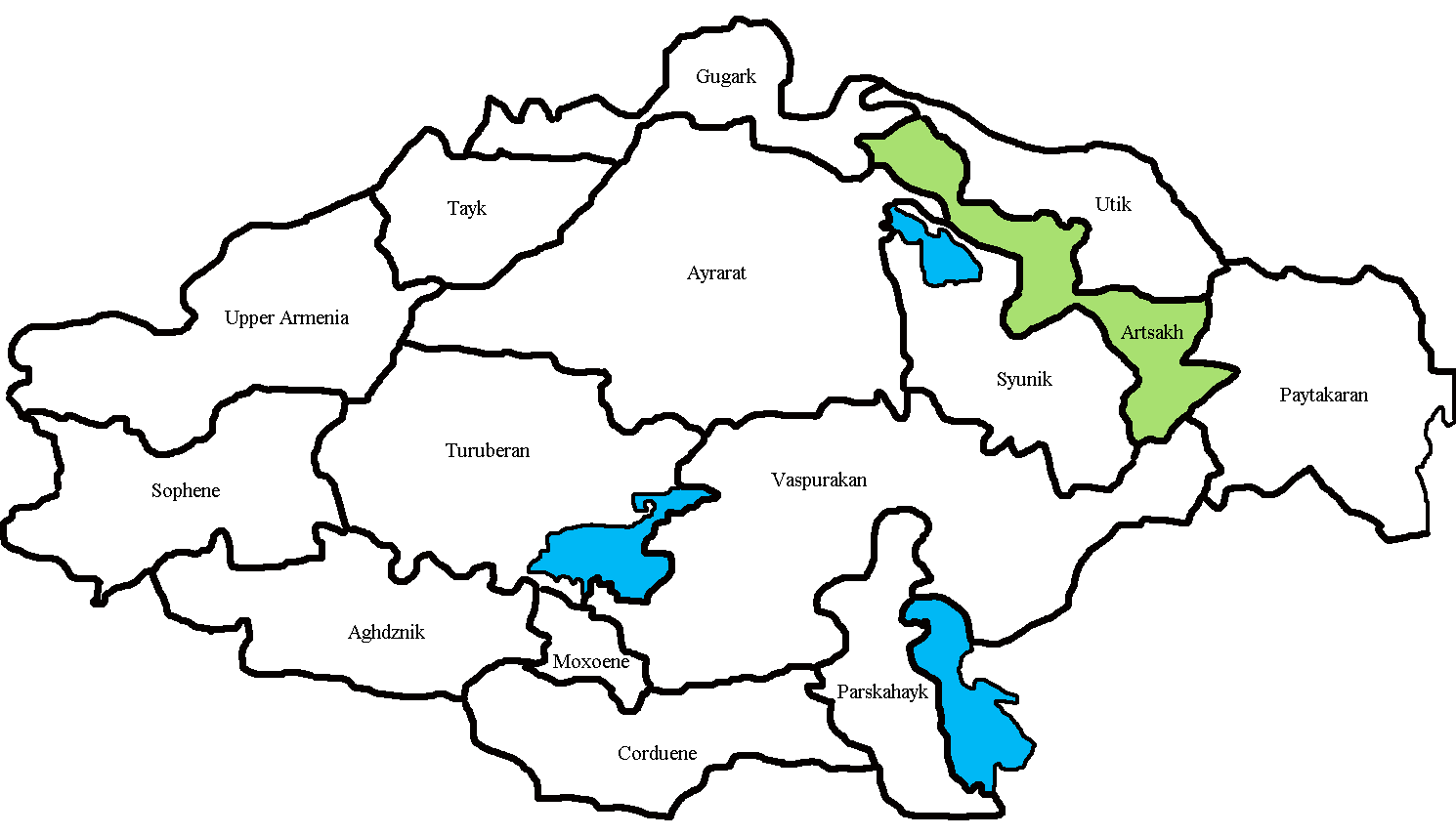
- Location of Artsakh (green) in Armenia
- Historical era: Antiquity, Middle Ages
  - Conquered by Artaxias I: c. 189 BC
  - Ceded to Caucasian Albania: 387 AD
  - Kingdom of Artsakh founded: 1000 AD

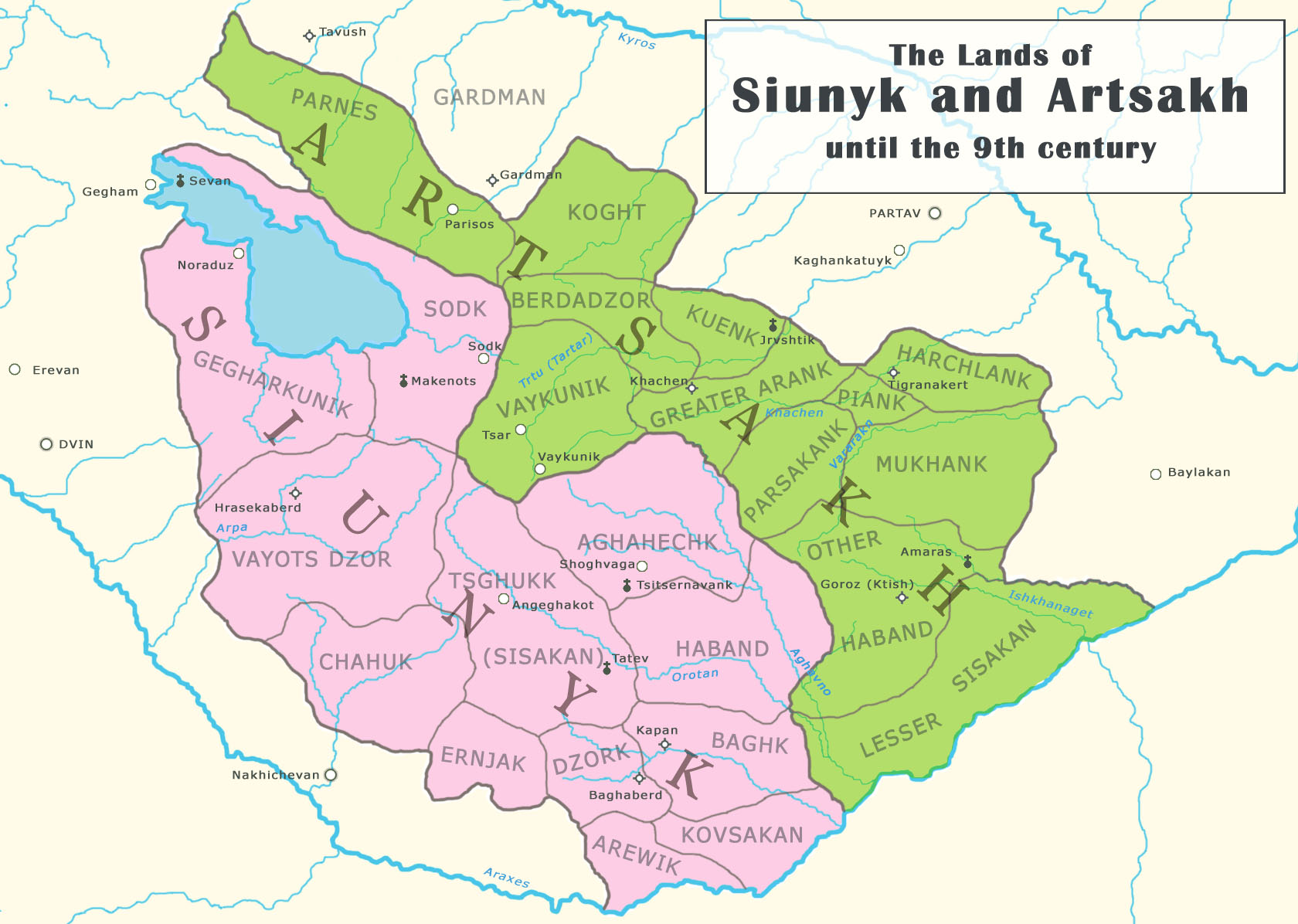
The lands of Syunik (left) and Artsakh (right) until the early 9th century

Artsakh (Armenian: Արցախ, romanized: Artsʻakh, pronounced [ɑɾˈtsʰɑχ]) was the tenth province (nahang) of the Kingdom of Armenia from c. 189 BC until 387 AD and afterwards made part of the Caucasian Albania, a subject principality of the Sasanian Empire, following the Peace of Acilisene. From the 7th to 9th centuries, it fell under Arab control. In 821, it formed the Armenian principality of Khachen and around the year 1000 was proclaimed the Kingdom of Artsakh, one of the last medieval eastern Armenian kingdoms and principalities to maintain its autonomy following the Turkic invasions of the 11th to 14th centuries.

== Name ==
Cuneiform inscriptions left by Urartian kings mention a land or lands called Ardakh/Adakh, Urdekhe/Urtekhini, and Atakhuni, which some scholars identify with Artsakh. (Note: Igor Diakonoff instead reads Urtekhini as a declined form of Urte and places it to the southwest of Arquqiu (modern-day Tsovak on the southeastern coast of Lake Sevan). He considers it possible that it refers to a mountain (possibly Mount Vardenis) rather than a region.) When speaking about Armenia in his Geography, the classical historian Strabo refers to an Armenian region which he calls "Orchistene", which is also believed to be a rendering of the name Artsakh. Some early Armenian sources spell the name as Ardzakh (Արձախ).

Many different proposed etymologies and interpretations of the name Artsakh exist. The 19th-century Armenian scholar Ghevont Alishan writes of the name's origin that it "remains unknown, but perhaps it would not be out of place to think that it comes from the name of bushes and trees tsakh, in accordance with the land's forested character". David M. Lang connects Artsakh with the name of King Artaxias I of Armenia (190–159 BC), founder of the Artaxiad dynasty that ruled Greater Armenia. Another scholar proposed that Artsakh consists of the elements art ("field" in Armenian) and aght (a Classical Armenian word for "black").

Based on the putative attestations of Artsakh as Urtekhe and Orchistene, historian Babken Harutyunyan hypothesizes that the initial vowel in Artsakh was originally an "o" sound (the vowel sounds "o" and "u" are not distinguished in cuneiform) that later underwent a vowel shift to an "a" sound, which is typical of Indo-European languages. On the basis of this assumption, linguist Lusine Margaryan proposes a connection with the Armenian word vortʻ (vortʻ in modern pronunciation, ortʻs in the plural accusative case), meaning 'grapevine', and the Hurro-Urartian suffix -ekhe/-akh (indicating placenames). According to this hypothesis, the name Artsakh developed from the unattested form *Ortʻsakh and can be interpreted as meaning "place of grapevines, grape garden"․ Another hypothesis derives the first part of the name from the root aghdz/ardz, meaning "rocky, mountainous". (Note: See Margaryan 2020 for an outline of other attempts at an etymology.)

In the Middle Ages, Artsakh was occasionally referred to as "Little Syunik" or "Second Syunik" after the neighboring province. Medieval Armenian authors also referred to it as Khachʻen(kʻ) or, together with neighboring Utik, Arewelkʻ ("East" in Armenian), Arewelitsʻ koghmankʻ ("the eastern regions"), Aghuanitsʻ koghmankʻ ("the Caucasian Albanian regions") or simply Aghuankʻ ("Caucasian Albania"). The name Artsakh was repopularized among Armenians in the modern era, particularly with the emergence of the Nagorno-Karabakh conflict. Artsakh is used by Armenians as a synonym for Karabagh and was used in the official name of the unrecognized Republic of Artsakh (also known as the Nagorno-Karabakh Republic).

== Geography ==
Artsakh was located on the easternmost edge of the Armenian Plateau (the eastern part of the Lesser Caucasus) and was mostly mountainous and forested. Its area is estimated to have been 11,528 km^{2}. It was bordered by the following Armenian provinces: Utik to the east, Gardman to the northeast, and Syunik to the southwest. The river Arax formed its southern boundary, while the Hakari/Aghavno River was its only clear boundary with Syunik. To its east and southeast laid the lowlands between the Kura and Arax rivers and the Mughan plain, which at one point formed the Paytakaran province of Armenia. Artsakh's two largest rivers were the Gargar and the Tartar (Trtu in Classical Armenian sources), which flow eastward and eventually join the Kura. The medieval Kingdom of Artsakh (1000–1261) encompassed the entire territory of the classical province and also included Gardman-Parisos to the north and the cantons of Sodk and Gegharkunik of Syunik, located on the shores of Lake Sevan.

Important places in Artsakh (mostly fortified towns) included Parisos, Tigranakert, Sodk, Tsar, Vaykunik, Asteghblur, Goroz and Berdaglukh. The city of Tigranakert, which was first excavated in 2005, is believed to have been founded by King Tigranes the Great of Armenia in the 1st century BC, although conceivably it could also have been founded by King Tigranes I (123–55 BC). Later, in the Caucasian Albanian period, the village of Gyutakan (Armenian: Գյուտական, known as the "Royal Village") became of great importance as the residence of Vachagan III the Pious (467–510 AD), the last King of Caucasian Albania. During early medieval times, the castle of Khachen served for a considerable time as the center of Artsakh.

== Cantons ==
According to the anonymous 7th-century Armenian work Ashkharatsoyts ("Geography") Artsakh comprised 12 cantons (gavars, variations on spelling exist):

- Myus Haband
- Vaykunik
- Berdadzor
- Mets Arank
- Mets Kvenk
- Harchlank
- Mukhank
- Piank
- Parzkank
- Sisakan Vostan or Sisakan-i-Kotak
- Kust-i-Parnes
- Koght

The precise location of many of these cantons is not known for certain, and not all of these names are used by later Armenian authors. Some versions enumerate 13 or 14 cantons.

== Status ==
It is not certain how Artsakh was administered as a sub-national political entity within Armenia. Ghevont Alishan believed that Artsakh was originally a part of Syunik that was later separated and regarded as its own province. According to some Armenian scholars, Artsakh formed a principality with the adjacent canton of Sodk. Conceivably it was royal land. Its northern part also comprised the principality of Koght and it is possible that the princes of Koght were the original owners of Artsakh. Under the rule of Caucasian Albania, Artsakh, while often referred to, was not a recognized political entity. By the 9th century it comprised a number of small political units ruled by the Aranshahiks, including the principalities of Khachen in the center and Dizak in the south. Only in the 13th century did these two states merge into one – the Kingdom of Artsakh.

== Population ==
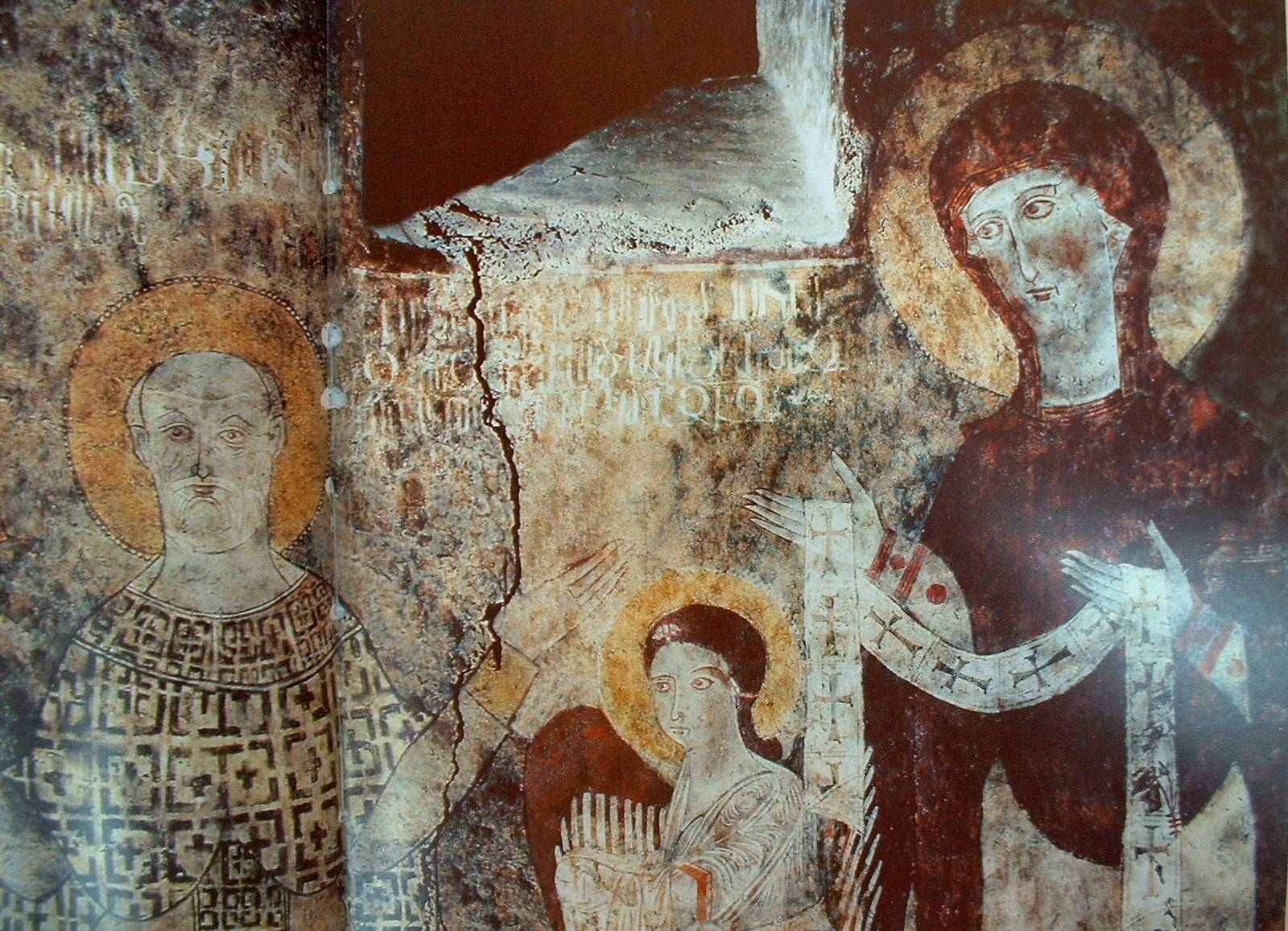
Fragment of a fresco with Armenian inscribed text in Dadivank Monastery

Anthropological studies show that the current Artsakh (Karabakh) Armenians are the direct physical descendants of the indigenous population of the region. Following the modern consensus among western scholars concerning the origin of the Armenian people, they represent a fusion of the mostly Indo-European natives of the Armenian Plateau (including Artsakh), and the Hurrians of the southernmost Armenian Plateau. According to this theory, from earliest times the Armenian Plateau was inhabited by many ethnic groups. The ethnic character of Artsakh may thus have been originally more diverse than it is now. It is worth noting that Strabo described Armenia (which then included also Artsakh and Utik) in the 1st century BC as "monolingual", though this does not necessarily mean that its population consisted exclusively of ethnic Armenians.

According to the Encyclopædia Iranica, the proto-Armenians had settled as far north as the Kura River by the 7th century BC. In Robert Hewsen's view, until the 6th–5th centuries BC the proto-Armenians lived only in the western half of the Armenian Plateau (in areas between Cappadocia, the Tigris, the Euphrates, and Lake Van) and came to Artsakh and adjacent regions such as Syunik and Utik somewhat later than the central parts of the Armenian Plateau (as late as the 2nd century BC, as a result of Artaxias I's conquests). But genetical studies debunked these claims and have shown that Artsakh was part of the original proto-Armenian homeland, and that Armenians are the direct descendants of the people that used to live in the region 7800 years ago. The conclusion from these studies is that even before the Bronze Age, the population was at the very least, mostly Armenian. Although little is known of the other people (except the Armenians) that lived in Artsakh and Utik prior to the putative 2nd-century BC where the region was part of Artaxiad Armenia, Hewsen argues that some names of those tribes (mentioned by Greek, Roman and Armenian authors) demonstrate that some of them were not Armenian, nor Indo-European, and that they assimilated into the Armenians over time.

By medieval times, from at least the 9th century, the population of Artsakh had a strong Armenian national identity. Its people spoke a local Eastern Armenian dialect, the Artsakhian dialect (today known as the Karabakh dialect), which was mentioned by 7th-century grammarian Stepanos Syunetsi in his earliest record of the Armenian dialects․

== History ==
=== Traditional views ===
The early Armenian historian Movses Khorenatsi tells of a certain Aran, a descendant of the legendary Armenian patriarch Hayk through Sisak, who inherited "the plain of Albania [Aghuankʻ] and the mountainous region of the same plain" from the Arax River up to the fortress of Hnarakert (located on the Kura), and was appointed governor (koghmnakal) by King Vagharsak the Parthian. Khorenatsi writes that Aran's descendants formed the ruling families of the lands of Utik, Gardman, Tsawdēkʻ and Gargar, and that Aghuankʻ (the Armenian name for Caucasian Albania/Arran) was named so after Aran, since he was called aghu (meaning "soft, tender, amiable" in Armenian) on account of his good manners. (Note: Ulubabyan believes "Gargar" to be an error in place of Gugark. Ulubabyan and Yeremyan identify Tsawdēkʻ with the canton of Sodk southeast of Lake Sevan, near Artsakh, although others place it farther away in southwestern Armenia.) This story is repeated by later medieval Armenian historians, including Stephen Orbelian and Movses Kaghankatvatsi. The latter author identifies Aran as the founder of the original ruling dynasty of Caucasian Albania, the Aranshahiks. Armenian historians such as Bagrat Ulubabyan and Asatur Mnatsakanyan interpret Khorenatsi's story about Aran and his descendants as an allegorical reflection of the historical Armenianness of the lands between the Kura and Arax rivers, i.e. Utik and Artsakh.

=== Early history ===
In 1968, Soviet archaeologists discovered a fragment of a jawbone of a pre-Homo sapiens human dating back possibly to the Middle Acheulean culture in a cave complex near the village of Azokh in modern-day Nagorno-Karabakh. Other sites of archaeological interest are located in the vicinity of Stepanakert, Khojaly, and Astghashen, where ancient burial mounds containing human and animal remains, tools, pottery and other objects have been discovered. In general, archaeological remains in Artsakh reflect the competing influences from around 800 BC of the neighboring rival states of Urartu, Assyria, and Mannai. If Artsakh is to be identified with the Adakh/Urtekhini/Atakhuni of Urartian cuneiform inscriptions, then it was the target of military campaigns by two Urartian kings: Sarduri II and Rusa I.

=== Classical Era ===
After the fall of Urartu (6th century BC), most of the region south of the Kura River came under the domination of the Medes, followed by the Achaemenian Persians until 331 BC when Alexander the Great invaded the region during his wars with the Achaemenids, upsetting its balance of power. In Robert H. Hewsen's view, Artsakh and neighboring Utik became a part of the Kingdom of Armenia only after 189 BC, when the Artaxiad dynasty came to power in Armenia. Strabo reports that King Artaxias I of Armenia (r. 189 – 159 BC) expanded his state in all directions at the expense of his neighbors, conquering the lands of Caspiane (previously ruled by the Medes) and "Phaunitis" (supposedly a copyist error for Saunities, i.e. Syunik), as well as, presumably, the lands lying in between Syunik and the Caspian Sea, i.e. Artsakh and Utik. Many Armenian historians reject this view, arguing that Artsakh and Utik were ruled and populated by Armenians from the earliest days of the formation of the Armenian people. It is possible that Artsakh had earlier been part of Orontid Armenia in the 4th–2nd centuries BC rather than under Median rule.

Strabo mentions that the land of Orchistene, frequently identified with Artsakh, "furnishes the most cavalry" of the Armenian provinces. In the Classical Armenian sources, Artsakh is described as a strategic and fortified region. In the words of the historian Leo, judging from the Classical Armenian sources, Artsakh, along with Syunik, Utik, Sasun and other remote regions of Greater Armenia, was regarded as a "wild" or "barbarous" province when compared with the center of the kingdom, Ayrarat.

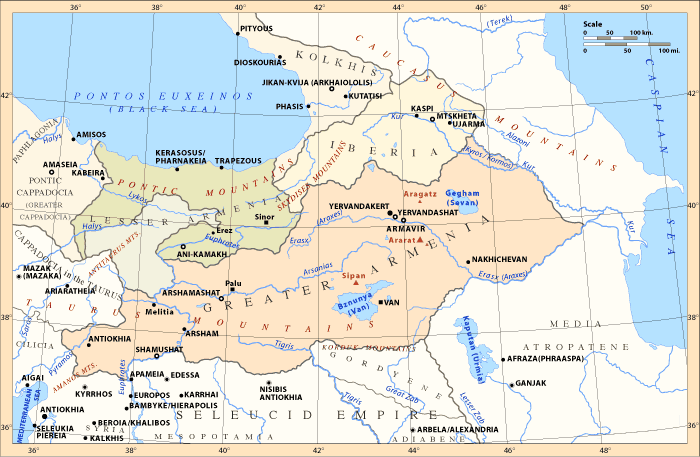
Map of Orontid Armenia, 4th–2nd centuries BC

In 301, Armenia was converted to Christianity under the Arsacid dynasty of Armenia. The Armenian historian Agathangelos mentioned the princes of Utik and Sodk (which probably comprised Artsakh) among the sixteen Armenian princes who escorted Gregory the Illuminator to Caesarea, where he would be enthroned the Patriarch of Armenia.

Artsakh became a major stronghold for Armenian missionaries to proclaim the Christian Gospel to neighboring countries. In 310 St Grigoris, the grandson of Grigor the Illuminator, was ordained bishop of Iberia and Caucasian Albania in the monastery of Amaras, being just 15 years old at the time. After his martyrdom by the Mazkutian king on the field of Vatnean (near Derbent), his disciples conveyed his body back to Artsakh and buried him in Amaras, which had been built by Gregory the Illuminator and Grigoris himself. Hence St Grigoris became a patron saint of Artsakh. The historian Pavstos Buzand wrote that "... every year the people of that places and cantons gathers there [in Amaras] for the festive commemoration of his valor".

In the 5th century, Christian culture flourished in Artsakh. Around 410 Mesrop Mashtots opened the first Armenian school at Amaras. Later, more schools were opened in Artsakh.

==== Armeno-Persian wars ====
The second half of the 4th century saw a series of wars between the Kingdom of Armenia and Sassanid Persia. After enduring 34 years of warfare, the Armenian nobility of Artsakh and most other provinces of Armenia revolted, refusing to support the Armenian king Arshak II anymore out of war-weariness. According to Pavstos Buzand, after bringing Arshak's son Pap to the Armenian throne and defeating the Sassanid invaders with Roman assistance, the Armenian sparapet (supreme commander) Mushegh Mamikonian severely punished the rebelling Armenian provinces, Artsakh included, and brought them back under the control of the Armenian monarchy. Then, in 372 he attacked the Caucasian Albanians and took back from them the neighboring province of Utik, in the process reestablishing the Kura River as the boundary between Armenia and Caucasian Albania.

In 387, according to the terms of the Peace of Acilisene, the Armenian kingdom was partitioned between the Roman and Sasanian empires. Caucasian Albania, as an ally of the Sassanids at the time, gained Armenian territories the right bank of the river Kura up to the Arax, including Artsakh, Gardman and Utik.

Following the Battle of Avarayr (451), in which a united Christian army consisting of Armenians, Georgians, and Caucasian Albanians clashed with the Sassanid army, many of the Armenian nobles retreated to impassable mountains and forests in several provinces, including Artsakh, which became a center for resistance against Sassanid Iran. From the 5th to the 7th centuries Artsakh was ruled by the Armenian noble family of Arranshahiks. Furthermore, the Armenian rulers of Artsakh began to play a considerable role in the affairs of Caucasian Albania. In 498 in the settlement named Aghuen (in present-day Mardakert region of Nagorno-Karabakh), an Albanian church assembly was held, in the presence of the nobility and princes (azgapetk) of Artsakh and the king Vachagan the Pious, to adopt the Constitution of Aghven, which would arrange relations between the nobility (landlords), clergy and village people.

=== Medieval Period ===
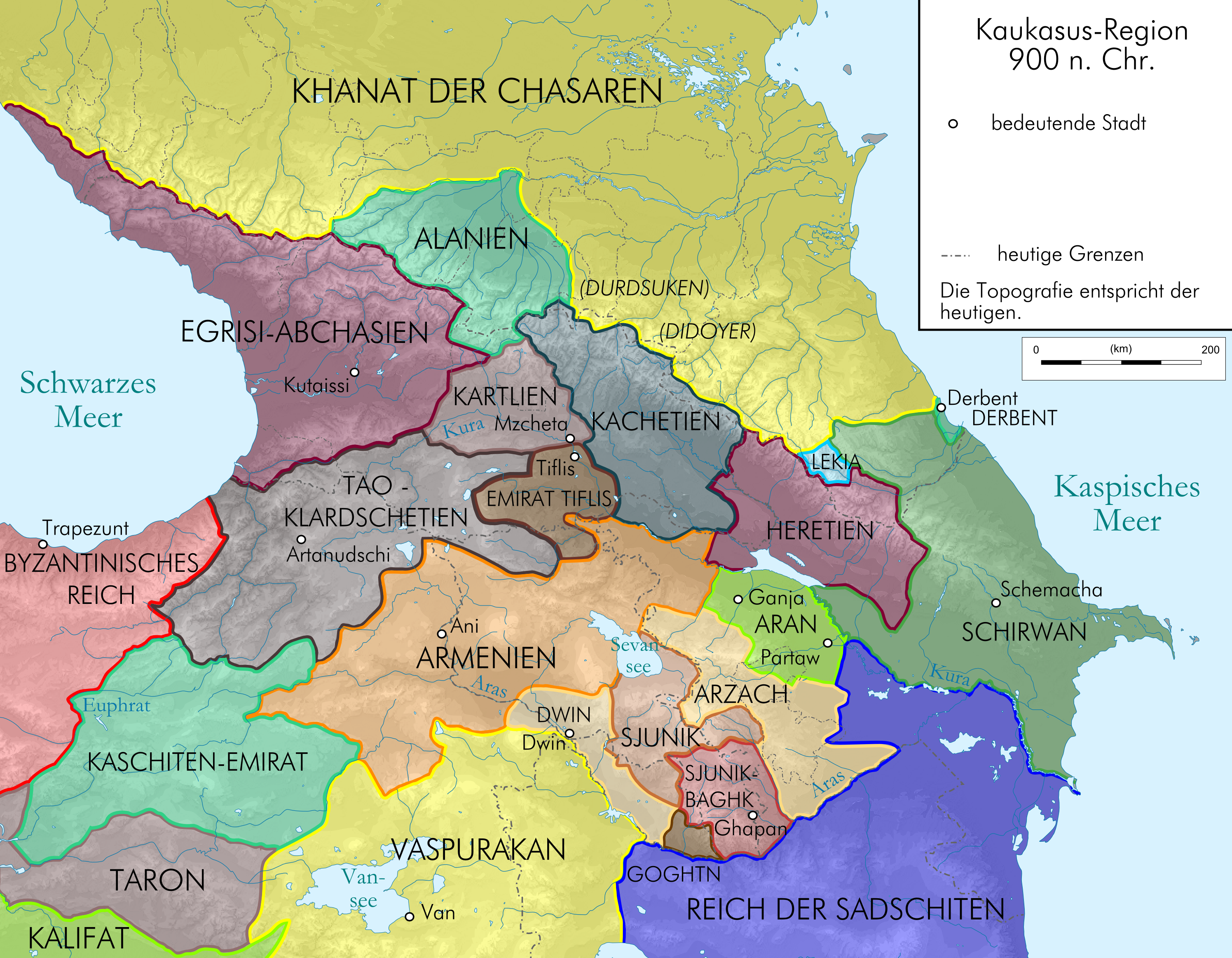
Political map of the Caucasus c. 900.

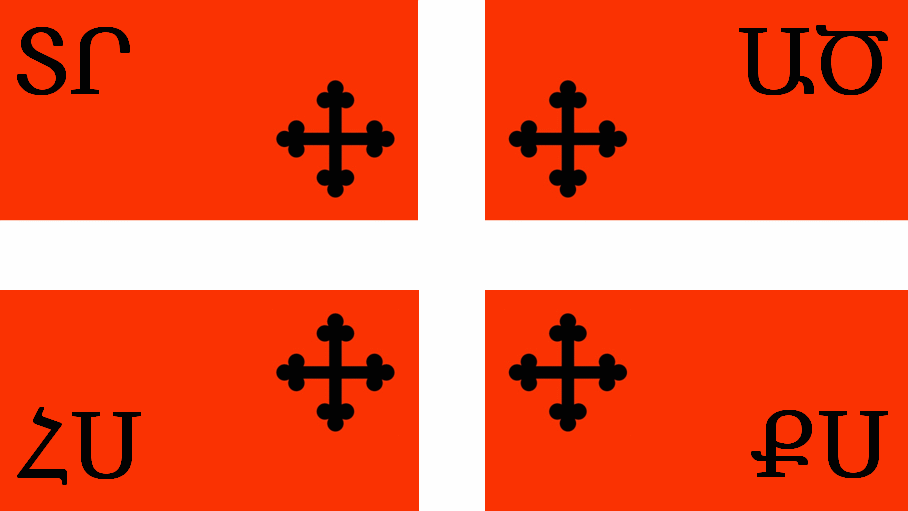
Royal Standard of the Principality of Khachen (Kingdom of Artsakh) during the reign of Grand Prince Hasan Jalal Dawla (1214–1261)

In the 7th–9th centuries, the South Caucasus was dominated by the Arab Caliphates. In the early 9th century two Armenian princes, Sahl Smbatian and Esayi Abu-Muse, revolted against Arab rule and established two independent principalities in Artsakh: Khachen and Dizak. At the time the Byzantine emperor Constantine VII addressed letters "to prince of Khachen – to Armenia", being the residence of the Armenian prince Sahl Smbatian. In 852–855 Sahl Smbatian and Esayi Abu-Muse fought against the Abbasid commander Bugha. The latter 28 times unsuccessfully attempted to conquer Ktich Castle (situated near modern-day Togh in Nagorno-Karabakh), the main stronghold of the Armenians of Artsakh. The descendants of Sahl Smbatian through his son Atrnerseh consolidated their rule over Artsakh over the years; Artsakh was politically unified for three-and-a-half centuries until Hasan the Great partitioned it between two of his sons in 1182. From c. 1000 to 1266 the rulers of Khachen styled themselves "Kings of Albania" or "Kings of Artsakh", but they stopped using the royal title after the death of Hasan Jalal Dawla in the 1260s. The principality eventually split into smaller parts known as the Khamsa Melikdoms of Karabakh, ruled by branches of the House of Hasan-Jalalyan. Subsequently, Artsakh existed as a vassal of the Kara Koyunlu, Ak Koyunlu, Iranian Safavids, Zands, Afsharids, and Qajars, until it was ceded to Imperial Russia following the outcome of the Russo-Persian War (1804-1813) and the following Treaty of Gulistan.
