= Catholicosate of Gandzasar =

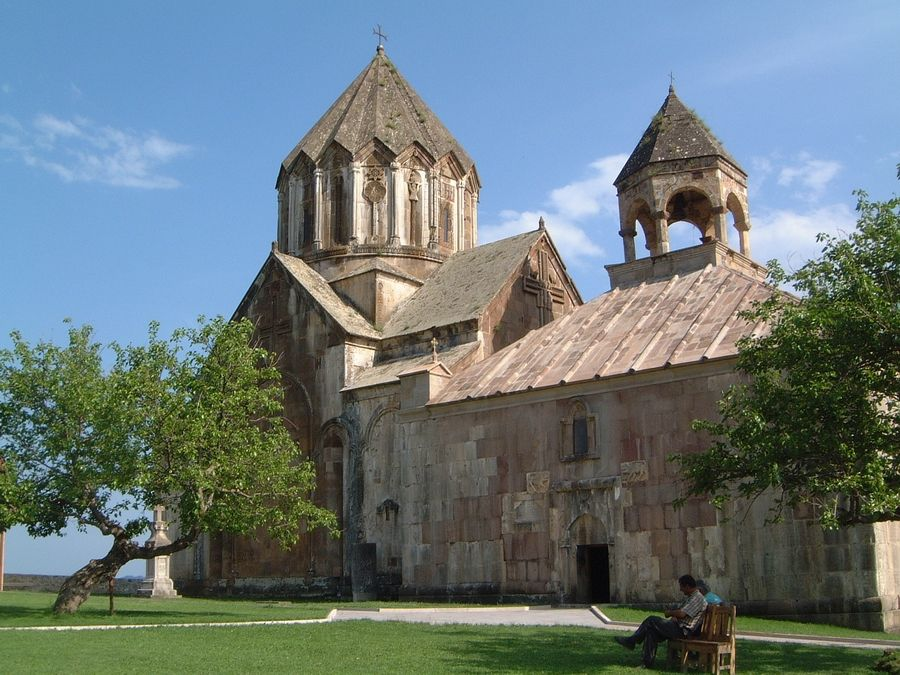
Gandzasar Monastery, seat of the Aghvank Catholicosate of the Armenian Apostolic Church until the 19th century.

The Catholicosate of Gandzasar, also known as the Catholicosate of Aghvank, was a separate diocese of the Armenian Apostolic Church that exercised jurisdiction over the former Church of Caucasian Albania. Its see remained at Partav for a time, was transferred to the Khamshi Monastery around 1213, and by the 15th century had moved to Gandzasar Monastery. From that period, its catholicoi were also members of the House of Hasan-Jalalyan.

The catholicosate also exercised jurisdiction over an Armenian diocese in the Golden Horde during the 13th and 14th centuries and, in the mid-18th century, the Armenian community of Astrakhan. The office of catholicos was abolished in 1815 and replaced by a metropolitan bishop. In 1836, the metropolitan office was also abolished, and its jurisdictions were subordinated directly to the Armenian Apostolic Church.

== History ==
The Catholicosate of Gandzasar or Aghvank (Caucasian Albania) of the Armenian Apostolic Church continued to exist well into the 19th century as a separate diocese of that church. There were attempts by the Church of Caucasian Albania to adopt Chalcedonianism and break with the rest of the Armenian Church so as to be autocephalous in the mid-10th century, but they were suppressed by the Armenian clergy with the support of King Ashot III. After the transfer of the seat of the Armenian patriarch to Rumkale, Cilicia, in the 12th century, the bishops no longer appealed to the former to ordain their Catholicoi. The original order was restored in 1634 after the seat of the Armenian patriarch returned to Etchmiadzin. The See of the Catholicate remained in Partav for a while. Around 1213, it was transferred to the Khamshi Monastery south of Gadabay. Beginning in 1240, the Gandzasar Monastery grew increasingly in importance, and in the 15th century it became the seat of the Aghvank Catholicosate of the Armenian Apostolic Church. From that period on, the Catholicoi also were members of the household of the Armenian princely family of Gandzasar, the House of Hasan-Jalalyan.

In addition to jurisdiction of the former Church of Caucasian Albania, the Catholicate maintained control over the Armenian diocese in the Golden Horde in the 13th and 14th centuries, centered in its capital city of Sarai. In the mid-18th century, the religious life of the Armenian community of Astrakhan was also supervised by the Catholicate of Aghvank. Beginning in the early 18th century, the Hasan-Jalalyans actively contributed to the Russian conquest of the South Caucasus. In 1815, two years after the Russian conquest of the Karabakh khanate, the office of the Catholicate was abolished, and its head replaced by a metropolitan bishop. In 1836, under the decree of Nicolas I which regulated the status of the Armenian Apostolic Church within the Russian Empire, the office of the Metropolitan Bishop was abolished completely. Its jurisdictions were subordinated directly to the Armenian Apostolic Church as the Dioceses of Artsakh and Shamakhy, as well as the Vicariate of Ganja within the Armenian Church's Tbilisi Consistory.
