= Juansher =

Mihranid prince of Caucasian Albania (d. 669)

- Arranshah
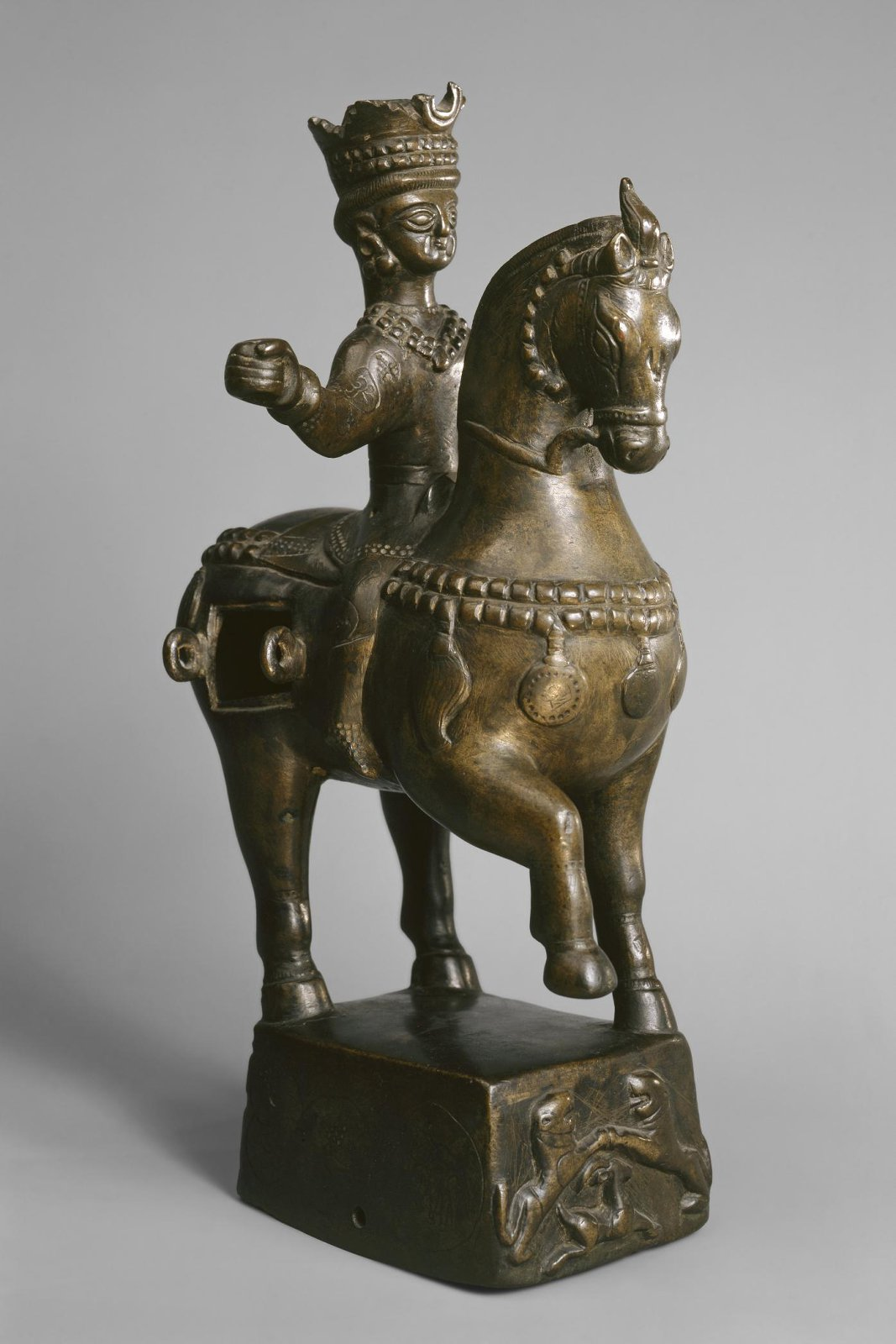
- A bronze sculpture of Juansher at the Hermitage

Ruler of Caucasian Albania
- Reign: 637 – 14 September 669
- Predecessor: Varaz Grigor
- Successor: Varaz-Tiridates I
- Died: 14 September 669; Partaw, Caucasian Albania
- Spouse: See below
- Issue: Varaz-Tiridates I
- Dynasty: Mihranids
- Father: Varaz Grigor
- Religion: Christianity

Juansher (Note: Also spelled Javanshir and Jevansher.) was the Mihranid prince of Caucasian Albania, ruling the principality from 637 to 669. He was the son and successor of Varaz Grigor (r. 628–637).

During his reign, Juansher changed his allegiance thrice. He started out as a subject to the Sasanian Empire, under which he fought against the Arab-Islamic invasion of Iran (632–654). Realizing the impending downfall of the Sasanians, he withdrew to Albania, where he rebelled. Although he briefly lost control over the Albanian lowlands and its capital, Partaw, his guerrilla warfare forced the Sasanians to grant him more autonomy.

Following the fall of the Sasanian Empire in 651, Juansher's father seemingly became the leader of Albania once more, due to his seniority. He took the safe route by acknowledging the suzerainty of the Rashidun Caliphate, but also instructed Juansher to establish contact with the Byzantine emperor Constans II (r. 641–668) and offer his services. Juansher submitted to the Byzantines, but this was implemented in practice only during the civil war in the caliphate between 656–661, when Constans II managed to exert his influence over all of the Southern Caucasus.

In 665, Juansher submitted to the Umayyad Caliphate, and in 667 reportedly played an important role in counselling Caliph Mu'awiya I (r. 661–680) on how to assassinate Constans II, which took place in 15 July 669. As a reward, Juansher was given control over Siwnik and one third of the tribute collected from Albania by the caliphate, which marked the zenith of Juansher's rule. He was himself assassinated on 14 September 669 during the Feast of the Cross by a traitor named Varaznoy, probably due to falling out with the Caliph. He was succeeded by his nephew Varaz-Tiridates I.

Albeit a Christian, Juansher still participated in activities related to Zoroastrianism, the official religion of the Sasanian Empire. He notably appears in what is considered to be the first long secular poem in Armenian literature, written by the 7th-century Armenian poet Davtak Kertogh.

== Background ==
Juansher belonged to Mihranid dynasty. Despite the dynasty's Parthian origin, they claimed to be descended from the Sasanian monarchs of Iran, who had held authority over Caucasian Albania since 252/3. It is uncertain how the Mihranids became Arranshahs (princes of Albania). Their ancestor, Mihran, was said to have received the region of Gardman by the Sasanian monarch Khosrow II (r. 590–628). In c. 600, a Mihranid prince conquered all of Albania and assumed the title of Arranshah. The head of the family's full titulature was thus "Lord of Gardman and Prince of Albania". Juansher was the second eldest of the four sons of the Albanian prince Varaz Grigor (r. 628–637). His name is derived from Persian Juwānshēr, meaning "young lion". He was most likely fluent in Middle Persian and Armenian, familiar with Albanian, and acquainted with some Greek and likely a small degree of Arabic.

== Reign ==
=== Under the Sasanian Empire ===
Map of the Byzantine-Iranian frontier during Late Antiquity. Albania is located on the upper right

During the Arab-Islamic invasion of Iran (632–654), Juansher was summoned to lead the Albanian contingent. Along with contingents from the neighbouring Sasanian-ruled regions of Siwnik and Armenia, Juansher was part of the army of Rostam Farrokhzad, the spahbed (commander-in-chief) of the northern part of the empire. Juansher succeeded his father in 637. When Juansher arrived at the Sasanian capital of Ctesiphon in 637 or 638, his position as sparapet (military commander) of the Albanians was officially acknowledged by the Sasanian monarch Yazdegerd III (r. 632–651). During the ensuing Battle of al-Qadisiyyah, in which the Arabs triumphed, Juansher suffered a serious wound. Along with some others, he managed to escape by swimming to the other side of the Euphrates River. When the Arabs later resumed their attacks and besieged Ctesiphon, Juansher led a force 3,000 soldiers on the right side of the Tigris River, being assigned to protect Yazdegerd III so he could move out of the city. The court, ministries, and the majority of the populace of the city likely went along with Yazdegerd III.

For several more years, Juansher fought under Farrukhzad, the brother and successor of Rostam. He participated in another crucial battle, which the 10th-century author Movses Kaghankatvatsi described as "a cruel defeat" for the Sasanians. In 644/45, Juansher went back to Albania through Adurbadagan (in present-day northwestern Iran), most likely due to losing faith in the Sasanian Empire, realizing its impending downfall. While he was still in Adurbadagan, Juansher alienated Farrukhzad by turning down a marriage alliance. After that, he rebelled against the Sasanians.

Although the Albanian lowlands and its capital, Partaw, were swiftly taken back by Sasanian forces, Juansher's guerrilla warfare proved to be extraordinarily effective, especially after he won the support of prominent figures in the neighbouring Principality of Iberia. Farrukhzad was thus forced to pursue a more accommodative course of action. With the help of Juansher's father-in-law, the prince of Siwnik, they came to an agreement that gave Juansher considerable autonomy. The quick military response Juansher gave to a later Sasanian attempt to regain control over Albania demonstrated that the balance of power was still shifting in his favour. During this period (most likely during the end of the 640s), as other spahbeds gained more control over their own territories, the Sasanian Empire was fragmenting into a network of regional rulerships that would not necessarily form a united front against the Muslim invaders. In 651, Yazdegerd III was killed by a local miller, thus marking the end of the Sasanian Empire.

=== Under the Byzantine Empire ===
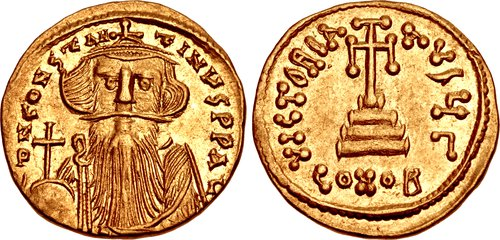
Coin of the Byzantine emperor Constans II (r. 641–668)

Following the fall of the Sasanian Empire, the local rulers in the Southern Caucasus had to choose whether to cooperate with the nascent, but possibly momentary Rashidun Caliphate, or the Byzantine Empire, which had survived the Muslim conquests. Juansher's father seemingly became the leader of Albania once more, due to his seniority. He took the safe route by acknowledging the suzerainty of the caliph, but also instructed Juansher to establish contact with the Byzantine emperor and offer his services. Juansher sent a letter to the Byzantine emperor Constans II (r. 641–668), in which he offered to become his vassal. The latter accepted his offer, bestowing Juansher with the high-ranking title of protopatrikios. Juansher was also given the authority to assign a number of Roman titles to his subjects, and a piece of the True Cross. Juansher's submission to the Byzantines most likely took place before Constans II's campaign to Armenia in the autumn of 653, but was first really implemented during the civil war in the caliphate between 656–661, when Constans II managed to exert his influence over all of the Southern Caucasus. The civil war ended with the dissolution of the Rashidun Caliphate, now replaced by the Umayyad Caliphate.

Movses depicts Juansher as a prominent local ruler during this period. When Juansher visited to see Constans II in person twice during his Southern Caucasian advance in 660–661, he received clear signs of favor on both occasions. He was officially anointed as king of "all the eastern peoples" at his second audience in the spring of 661, making him a client ruler comparable to Hamazasp IV Mamikonian in Armenia. After the Muslim civil war ended, it took some time before the caliphate established its authority once again north of the Zagros Mountains. Throughout this period, Juansher and the other Southern Caucasian rulers maintained their dominion as Byzantine subjects. Movses praises Juansher for launching a construction initiatives and winning the admiration of the adjacent rulers. However, the Byzantine-supported peace in the area was short-lived.

The Khazars, who were expanding their dominance in the Kuban and Terek steppes, launched a series of raids into the Caucasus in 662. In 665, the Caucasus was attacked again, this time by the North Caucasian Huns, who were likely proxies of the Khazars. The Huns planned their invasion to coincide with the winter solstice in order to ambush flocks and herds from Ayrarat and Siwnik on the winter pastures of the Araxes and Kura rivers. They gained much loot from the attack, which their king later returned after making peace with Juansher during a summit meeting.

=== Under the Umayyad Caliphate ===
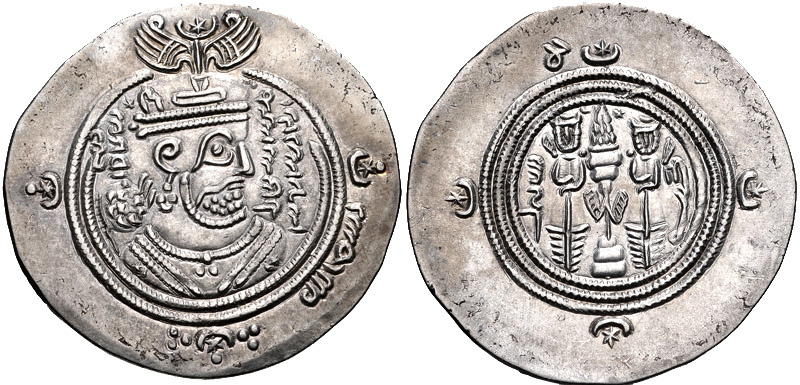
Sasanian-style coin minted in the name of the Umayyad caliph Mu'awiya I (r. 661–680)

In the same year, Juansher submitted to the Umayyad caliph Mu'awiya I (r. 661–680) after being summoned by him. In 667/68, Juansher was amongst the figures summoned by Mu'awiya I to seek counsel on how to assassinate Constans II, who was in Sicily at the time. Juansher reportedly played an important role in the decision (Constans II was assassinated on 15 July 669), being in return rewarded with many gifts, and with Siwnik added to his domain. He was also offered rule of Adurbadagan, but declined and instead received one third of the tribute collected from Albania by the caliphate. This marked the zenith of Juansher's rule. On 14 September 669, while celebrating the Feast of the Cross at Partaw, he was assassinated by a traitor named Varaznoy. The English historian James Howard-Johnston notes that this assassination, like that of Constans II, seemed to be "carefully planned." He also adds that "Perhaps Juanšer had baulked at the thought of sharing responsibility for killing the senior Christian ruler appointed by God to manage earthly affairs. More probably he simply knew too much about the conspiracy against Constans. Whatever the reason, it seems likely that he had forfeited the trust of the caliph and paid for it with his life."

Juansher was succeeded by his nephew Varaz-Tiridates I.

== Culture ==
Although Christianity was the official religion of Albania and held significant political power, Zoroastrianism—the official religion of the Sasanian Empire—exerted a significant influence, particularly between the 6th and middle of the 7th-century. Despite being a Christian, Juansher continued to take part in the traditional Zoroastrian New Year's Feast of Nawasard with his personal bodyguards, and delight in the pagan performances of the gusank ("ministrels").

A chapter of Movses' book The History of the Caucasian Albanians includes a poem dedicated to Juansher by the 7th-century Armenian poet Davtak Kertogh, which is considered the first long secular poem in Armenian literature.

== Family ==
Juansher reportedly married three times. His first wife was the daughter of the prince of Siwnik, who died in c. 659. His second wife was a certain Xosrovanush, and his third was a daughter of the North Caucasian Hun king, whom he married in 665.

== Sources ==
- Baumer, Christoph (2021). History of the Caucasus: Volume 1: At the Crossroads of Empires. Bloomsbury Publishing. doi:10.5040/9780755639700. ISBN 978-1788310079.
- Bosworth, C. E. (1986). "Arrān". In Yarshater, Ehsan (ed.). Encyclopædia Iranica. Vol. II/5: Armenia and Iran IV–Art in Iran I. London and New York: Routledge & Kegan Paul. pp. 520–522. ISBN 978-0-71009-105-5.
- Daryaee, Touraj (2014). Sasanian Persia: The Rise and Fall of an Empire. I.B.Tauris. ISBN 978-0-85771-666-8.
- Daryaee, Touraj (2021). "Introduction". In Daryaee, Touraj (ed.). Sasanian Iran in the Context of Late Antiquity. Brill. pp. 1–3. doi:10.1163/9789004460669_002. ISBN 978-0-9994755-8-4.
- Dowsett, Charles (1961). The History of the Caucasian Albanians. Oxford University. OCLC 445781.
- Gadjiev, Murtazali (2022). "Religious Life in Caucasian Albania: Christianity vs Zoroastrianism / Религиозная жизнь в Кавказской Албании: христианство vs зороастризм". Вестник древней истории (Herald of Ancient History). 82 (3): 672–699. doi:10.31857/S032103910018041-8. ISSN 0321-0391.
- Greenwood, Tim (2022). "Negotiating the North: Armenian Perspectives on the Conquest Era". In Osti, Letizia; van Berkel, Maaike (eds.). The Historian of Islam at Work: Essays in Honor of Hugh N. Kennedy. Brill. pp. 591–613. doi:10.1163/9789004525245_030. ISBN 978-90-04-52523-8.
- Hacikyan, Agop Jack (2002). The Heritage of Armenian Literature: From the sixth to the eighteenth century. Vol. II. Wayne State University Press. ISBN 081-4330231.
- Hawting, G.R. (2000). "Umayyads". In Bearman, P. J.; Bianquis, Th.; Bosworth, C. E.; van Donzel, E. & Heinrichs, W. P. (eds.). The Encyclopaedia of Islam, Second Edition. Volume X: T–U. Leiden: E. J. Brill. pp. 840–847. doi:10.1163/1573-3912_islam_COM_1287. ISBN 978-90-04-11211-7.
- Howard-Johnston, James (2010). Witnesses to a World Crisis: Historians and Histories of the Middle East in the Seventh Century. Oxford University Press. ISBN 978-0-19-920859-3.
- Howard-Johnston, James (2020). "Caucasian Albania and its historian". In Hoyland, Robert (ed.). From Albania to Arrān: The East Caucasus between the Ancient and Islamic Worlds (ca. 330 BCE–1000 CE). Gorgias Press. pp. 351–371. doi:10.31826/9781463239893-019. ISBN 978-1463239886.
- Hoyland, Robert G. (2014). In God's Path: The Arab Conquests and the Creation of an Islamic Empire. Oxford University Press. ISBN 978-0-19-991636-8.
- Rapp, Stephen H. (1997). Imagining History at the Crossroads: Persia, Byzantium, and the Architects of the Written Georgian Past, vol. 1. University of Michigan. ISBN 978-0591308280.
- Russell, James R. (2020). Poets, Heroes, and their Dragons (2 vols). Brill. doi:10.1163/9789004460737. ISBN 978-9004460065.
- Shahbazi, A. Shapur (2005). "Sasanian dynasty". Encyclopaedia Iranica, Online Edition.
- Toumanoff, Cyril (1963). Studies in Christian Caucasian history. Georgetown University Press. OCLC 634666433.
- Vacca, Alison (2022). "Arrān". In Fleet, Kate; Krämer, Gudrun; Matringe, Denis; Nawas, John; Rowson, Everett (eds.). Encyclopaedia of Islam (3rd ed.). Brill Online. doi:10.1163/1573-3912_ei3_COM_24958. ISSN 1873-9830.
- Zuckerman, Constantin (2020). "The Caucasus between Byzantium and the Caliphate (9th-10th c.)". In Hoyland, Robert (ed.). From Albania to Arrān: The East Caucasus between the Ancient and Islamic Worlds (ca. 330 BCE–1000 CE). Gorgias Press. pp. 149–191. doi:10.31826/9781463239893-011. ISBN 978-1463239886. S2CID 241889781.

Juansher Mihranid dynasty Died: 14 September 669
Preceded by Varaz Grigor	Ruler of Caucasian Albania; 637 – 14 September 669	Succeeded by Varaz-Tiridates I
