= Barda, Azerbaijan =

City in Azerbaijan

Barda Bərdə
- City & Municipality
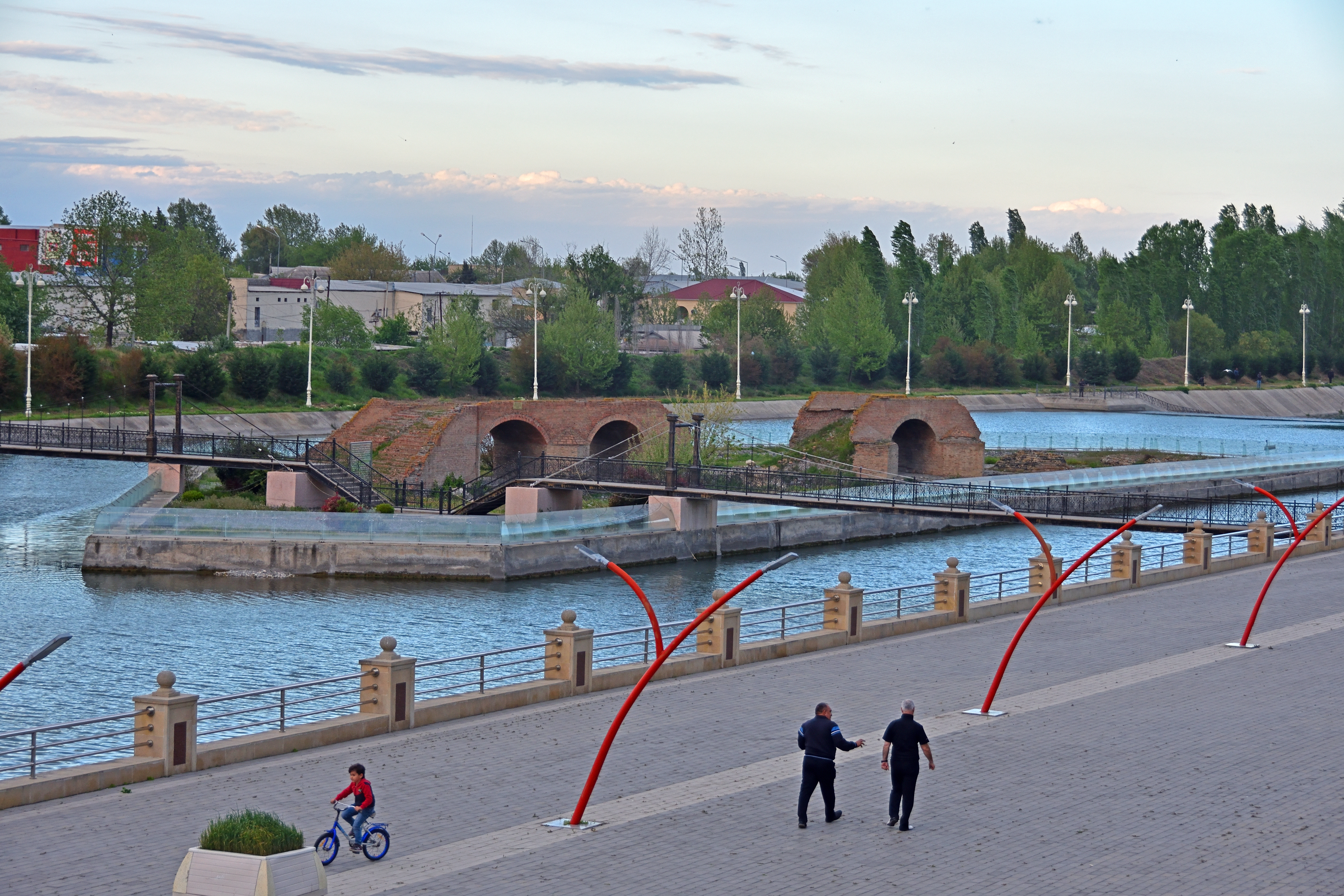
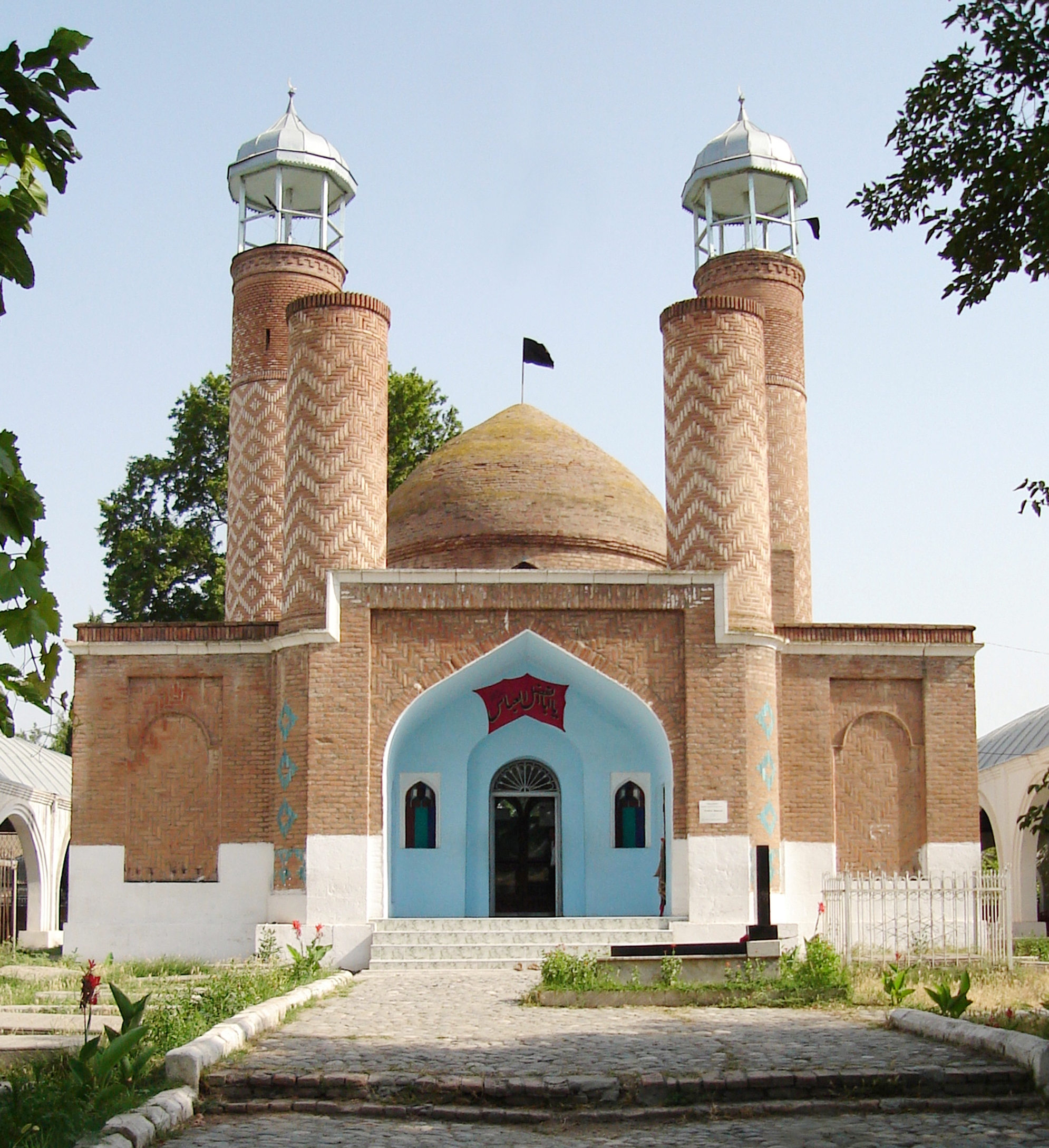
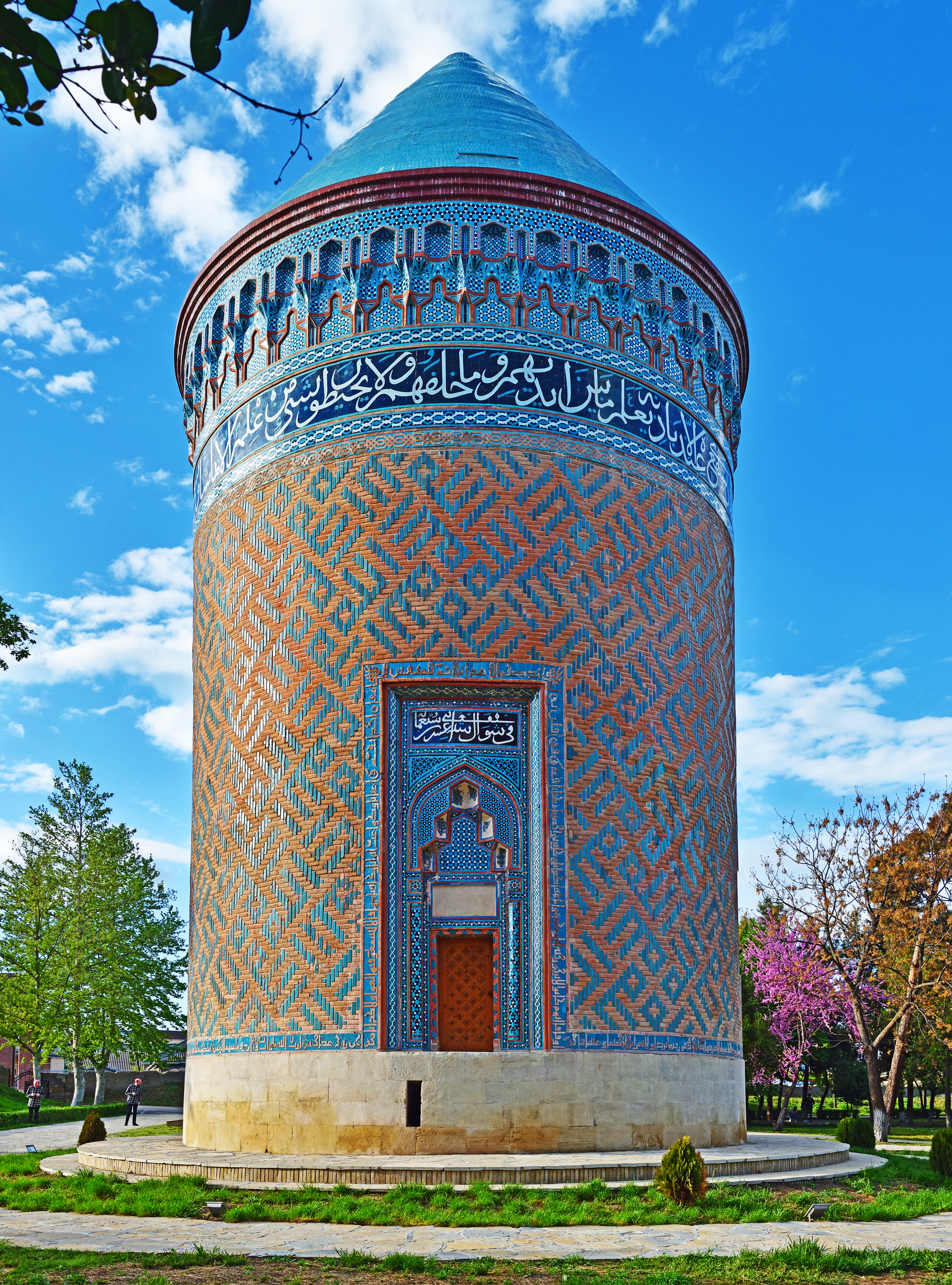
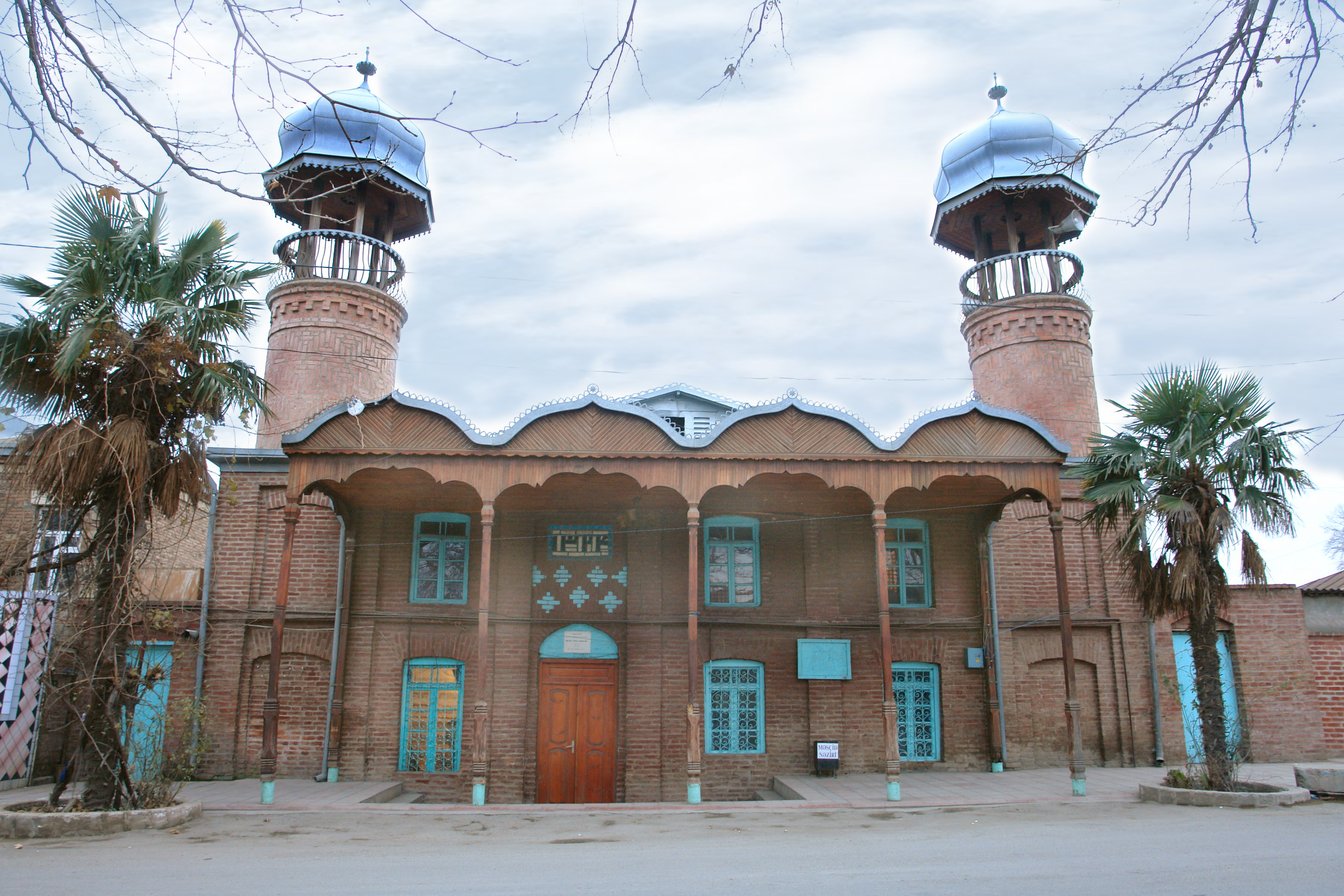
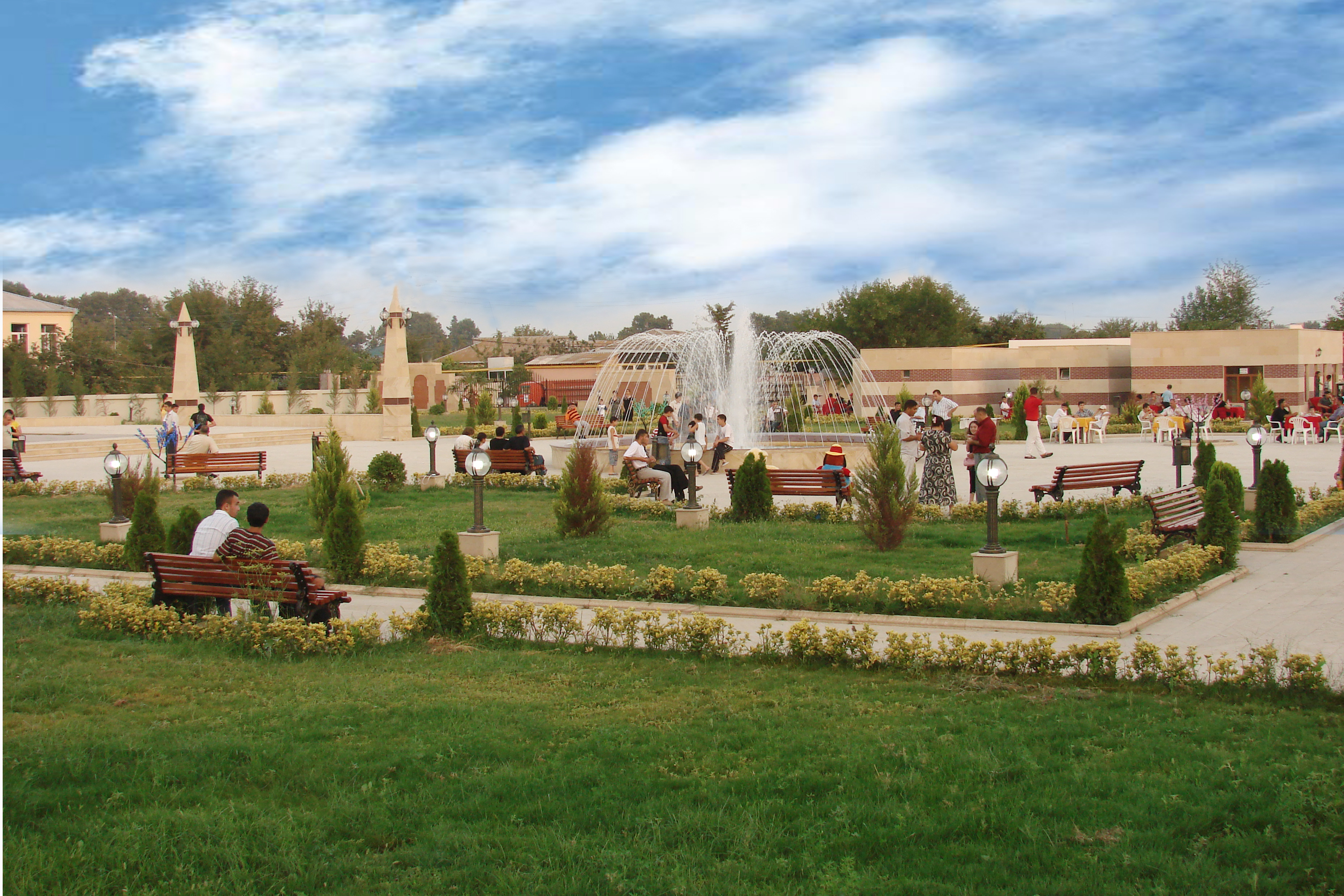
- Ancient bridge Imamzadeh Mausoleum Barda Mausoleum Barda Juma Mosque State Art Gallery Sabir Garden Park Barda Sports Center

- Location within Azerbaijan Location within Karabakh Economic Region
- Coordinates: 40°22′28″N 47°07′36″E
- Country: Azerbaijan
- Elevation: 76 m (249 ft)

Population (2010)
  - Total: 41,277
- Time zone: UTC+4 (AZT)
- Area code: +994 2020

Barda (Azerbaijani: Bərdə) is a city and the capital of the Barda District in Azerbaijan, located south of Yevlax and on the left bank of the Tartar river. It served as the capital of Caucasian Albania by the end of the 5th century. Barda became the chief city of the Islamic province of Arran, the classical Caucasian Albania, remaining so until the 10th century.

== Etymology ==
The name of the town derives from (Arabic: برذعة, romanized: Bardhaʿa) which derives from Old Armenian Partaw (Պարտաւ). The etymology of the name is uncertain. According to the Iranologist Anahit Perikhanian, the name is derived from Iranian *pari-tāva- 'rampart', from *pari- 'around' and *tā̆v- 'to throw; to heap up'. According to the Russian-Dagestani historian Murtazali Gadjiev, however, the name means "Parthian/Arsacian" (cf. Parthian *Parθaυ; Middle Persian: Pahlav; Old Persian: Parθaυa-). The name is attested in Georgian as Bardav[i] (ბარდავი).

== History ==
=== Ancient ===
According to The History of the Country of Albania, the Sasanian King of Kings (shahanshah) of Iran, Peroz I (r. 459–484) ordered his vassal the Caucasian Albanian king Vache II (r. 440–462) to have the city of Perozapat ("the city of Peroz" or "Prosperous Peroz") constructed. However, this is unlikely as the Kingdom of Caucasian Albania had been abolished by Peroz after a suppressing a revolt by Vache II in the mid-460s. The city was seemingly founded by Peroz himself after the removal of the ruling family in Caucasian Albania. Due to its more secure location, it was made the new residence of the Iranian marzban (margrave). Within Albania, it was located in the province of Utik. The city was most likely renamed Partaw (cf. Parthian *Parθaυ) between 485–488 and became the new capital of Albania (thus replacing Kabalak) under Vachagan III (r. 485–510), who was installed on the throne by Peroz's brother and successor Balash (r. 484–488).

Regardless, the city did not serve as the residence of the Albanian kings, and was a symbol of foreign rule. The city was fortified by shahanshah Kavad I (r. 488–496, 498/9–531) and renamed Perozkavad ("victorious Kavad"). Nevertheless, the city was still referred to as Partaw. In 552, the city became the seat of the catholicos of the Church of Caucasian Albania. Partaw served as the residence of the Sasanian prince Khosrow (the future Khosrow II) after his appointment to the governorship of Albania by his father Hormizd IV (r. 579–590) in 580. Partaw was most likely captured before 652 by the Rashidun Caliphate. It became known as Bardha‘a in Arabic.

=== Medieval ===
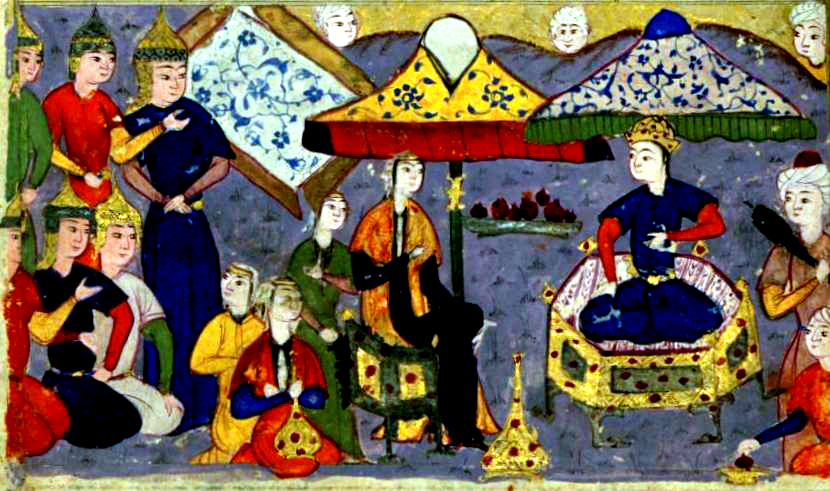
Alexander the Great in Nushabah's Pavilion in Barda. From an illustrated manuscript of Nizami Ganjavi's Iskandarnameh

In ca. 789, it was made the second alternate capital (after Dvin) of the governor (ostikan) of the province of Arminiya. Its governors strengthened the defenses of the city in order to counter the invasions of the Khazars attacking from the north. In 768, the Catholicos of All Armenians, Sion I Bavonats'i, convoked an ecclesiastical council at Partav, which adopted twenty-four canons addressing issues relating to the administration of the Armenian Church and marriage practices. By the ninth to tenth centuries, Barda had largely lost its economic importance to the nearby town of Gandzak/Ganja; the seat of the Catholicos of the Church of Albania was also moved to Bardak (Berdakur), leaving Partav a mere bishopric. According to the Muslim geographers Estakhri, Ibn Hawqal, and Al-Muqaddasi, the distinctive Caucasian Albanian language (which they called al-Raniya, or Arranian) persisted into early Islamic times, and was still spoken in Barda in the 10th century. Ibn Hawkal noted that the people of Barda spoke Arranian, while Estakhri says that Arranian was the language of the "country of Barda."

During this time, the city boasted a Muslim Arab population, as well as a substantial Christian community. Barda was even the seat of a Nestorian (Christian) Bishopric in the 10th century. Referring to events in the late 11th century, the 12th-century Armenian historian Matthew of Edessa described Partav as an "Armenian city ["K'aghak'n Hayots'"], which is also called Paytakaran and located near the vast [Caspian] Sea." Muslim geographers also described Barda as a flourishing town with a citadel, a mosque (the treasury of Arran was located here), a circuit wall and gates, and a Sunday bazaar that was called "Keraki," "Korakī" or "al-Kurki" (a name derived from Greek κυριακή [kyriaki], the Lord's Day and Sunday; the Armenian kiraki similarly derives from kyriaki). In 914, the city was captured by the Rus, who occupied it for six months. In 943, it was attacked once more by the Rus and sacked. This may have been a factor in the decline of Barḏa in the second half of the 10th century, along with the raids and oppression of the rulers of the neighboring regions, when the town lost ground to Beylaqan.

Centuries of earthquakes and, finally, the Mongol invasions destroyed much of the town's landmarks, with the exception of the 14th-century tomb of Ahmad Zocheybana, built by architect Ahmad ibn Ayyub Nakhchivani. The mausoleum is a cylindrical brick tower, decorated with turquoise tiles. There is also the more recently built Imamzadeh Mosque, which has four minarets.

=== Modern ===
Agriculture is the main activity in the area. The local economy is based on the production and processing of cotton, silk, poultry and dairy products. The cease-fire line, concluded at the end of the First Nagorno-Karabakh War in 1994, is just a few kilometers west of Barda, near Terter.

On 27 October 2020, Armenian missiles struck the city, killing at least 21 civilians, including a seven-year-old girl, and injuring 70 others. Human Rights Watch and Amnesty International verified the use of cluster munitions by Armenia.

== Notable residents ==
- Mihranids of Caucasian Albania: Javanshir, Varaz-Tiridates I. etc.
- Arabic governors: Muhammad ibn Abi'l-Saj, etc.
- Paykar Khan Igirmi Durt. Qizilbash chieftain in the service of Safavid Persia in the late 16th and early 17th centuries. His career flourished in the southeastern Caucasus, where he ran the governments of Barda and Kakheti on behalf of Shah Abbas I until being overthrown in a Georgian uprising in 1625.

== Sources ==
- Bosworth, C. E. (1988). "Barḏaʿa". Encyclopædia Iranica, online edition, Vol. III, Fasc. 7. New York. pp. 779–780.
- Chaumont, M. L. (1985). "Albania". Encyclopaedia Iranica, Vol. I, Fasc. 8. pp. 806–810.
- Kennedy, Hugh (2004) [1986]. The Prophet and the Age of the Caliphates: The Islamic Near East from the 6th to the 11th Century (Second ed.). Harlow: Longman. ISBN 978-0-582-40525-7.
- Gadjiev, Murtazali (2017). "Construction Activities of Kavād I in Caucasian Albania". Iran and the Caucasus. 21 (2). Brill: 121–131. doi:10.1163/1573384X-20170202.
- Howard-Johnston, James (2010). "Ḵosrow II". Encyclopaedia Iranica, Online Edition.
- Hoyland, Robert (2020). From Albania to Arrān: The East Caucasus between the Ancient and Islamic Worlds (ca. 330 BCE–1000 CE). Gorgias Press. pp. 1–405. ISBN 978-1463239886.
