= Hnarakert =

Castle in Azerbaijan

Hnarakert or Hunarakert (Armenian: Հնարակերտ or Հունարակերտ, Azerbaijani: Xunan qalası) is an antique castle which was located at the border of the Gugark and Utik provinces of Greater Armenia, on the Kura River (the Kazakh region of modern Azerbaijan).

According to Rafayel Matevosian, "From Koti the road diverts to Tiflis and from there to Hunarakert. The latter was the border point of Armenia, Georgia and Caucasian Albania."

== Etymology ==
See Hnarakert for etymology.
