= Varaz-Tiridates I =

Varaz Trdat
- King of Caucasian Albania
- Reign: 680–705
- Coronation: 680
- Predecessor: Javanshir
- Successor: Gagik
- Born: Unknown
- Died: 705
- Burial: Gardman castle
- Consort: Sparama
- Issue: Gagik; Vardan II; Stepannos I
- Dynasty: Mihranids
- Father: Varaz Peroz
- Religion: Church of Caucasian Albania

Varaz Trdat, was the Mihranid king of Caucasian Albania from 670 to 705.

He was kept as prisoner in Constantinople from 694 until 699. In his absence, his queen Sparama and regent prince Shero served as regents but became involved in conflict. Shero was imprisoned by Arabs when Trdat came back to throne.

After his death, kingdom was abolished and the Mihranids stood as princes of Gardman.
