= Utik =

Historical province of Greater Armenia

- Province of the Kingdom of Armenia
- 189 BC–387 AD
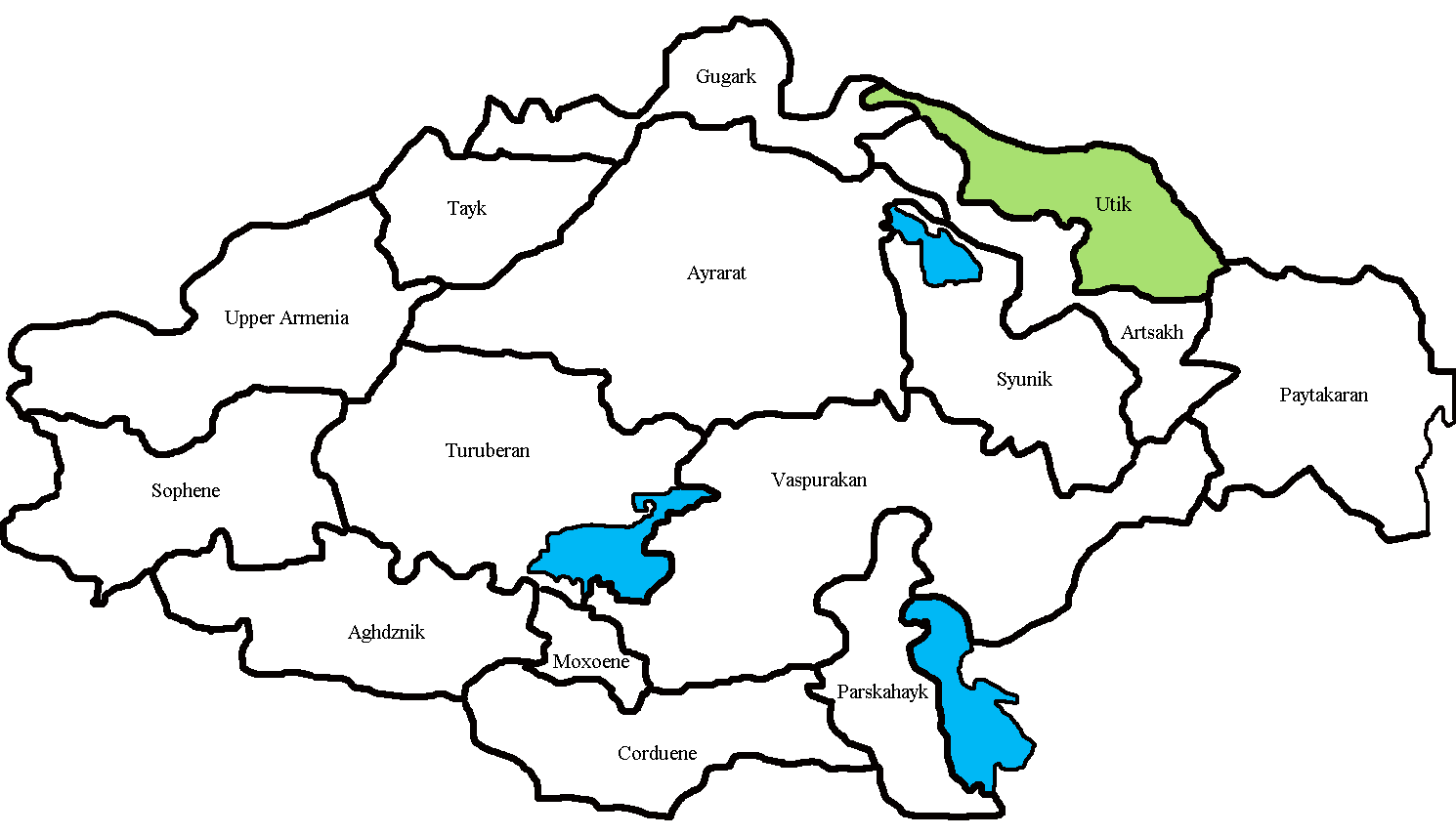
- Utik within Greater Armenia according to the Ashkharhatsuyts (per Suren Yeremian's map)
- Historical era: Antiquity; Middle Ages
  - Artaxias I declaring himself independent: 189 BC
  - Given to Caucasian Albania by Sasanian Iran: 387 AD
- Today part of: Azerbaijan; Armenia

Utik within the Kingdom of Armenia in 150 AD. The area around the confluence of the Kura and Arax is placed in Paytakaran instead of Utik, per Yeremian but rejected by Hewsen and Harutiunian.

Utik (Armenian: Ուտիք, romanized: Utik’), also known as Uti, was a historical province and principality within the Kingdom of Armenia. It was ceded to Caucasian Albania following the partition of Armenia between Sassanid Persia and the Eastern Roman Empire in 387 AD. Most of the region is located within present-day Azerbaijan immediately west of the Kura River, while a part of it lies within the Tavush province of present-day northeastern Armenia.

It spread across the plains on the right bank of the Kura River and the northeastern mountainous regions of the Armenian Highlands, occupying the territory stretching from the Aghstev River to the confluence of the Kura and Aras rivers. In the north and east, it bordered Caucasian Albania along the Kura River; in the west, it bordered Gugark along the watershed of the Debed and Aghstev rivers; in the northwest, it bordered Ayrarat and Syunik along the Mrghuz and Sevan mountain ranges; in the southwest, it bordered Artsakh; and in the south, it bordered Paytakaran along the Aras River.

== Name ==
In Armenian sources, Utik is also called Uti, (Note: Without the suffix -k’, which forms the nominative plural and the names of countries) Awti, Utiats’wots’ ashkharh 'land of the people of Utik', Utiats’wots’ gavar’ 'district of the people of Utik', Utiakan ashkharh and Utiakan gavar’ 'Utian land/district'. In Suren Yeremian's view, the name originally referred to the district of Uti Arandznak ('Uti Proper'), where the Utian (utiats’i) tribe lived, and was later applied to the larger province. It is identified with the place names Otene in Ptolemy's Geography, Otenon in the Latin Ravenna Cosmography, Otena by Pliny, and Ūdh in the Arabic history Futuh al-Buldan by al-Baladhuri. It may also be identifiable with the land called Ouitia by Strabo, although others have placed Strabo's Ouitia on the northwestern or southern shore of the Caspian Sea. According to Robert H. Hewsen, the name of Utik is likely connected with the ethnonyms Outioi, mentioned by Herodotus, Ouitioi, mentioned by Strabo, (Note: Hakobyan thinks that Strabo refers to two groups called Ouitians living in different places: one on the southern coast of the Caspian Sea, and one north of the Albanians and Caspians on the western coast of the sea.) and Udini, mentioned by Pliny. Pliny also mentions a group called the Uti, which suggests that this is a separate group from the Udini, and the Utidorsi, whose name is thought to be a combination of Uti and Aorsi, another group. Wolfgang Schulze writes that Otene and Uti(k) are not necessarily related and may refer to two distinct regions. Udi-/Uti- may be an old toponym referring to the lowlands between the Kura River, the Arax, and the mountains of Karabakh. The place name is related to the name of the Udi people, who live in the South Caucasus today north of the Kura, mainly in the village of Nij in Azerbaijan (see the Population section below). Later, Utik and neighboring Artsakh were known as Karabakh, with the territory of Utik forming the lowland or steppe part of Karabakh. Its territory also overlapped with the region known as Arran, which in its strict sense referred to the area between the Kur and Arax rivers and in its broader sense encompassed the eastern South Caucasus.

== Geography and administration ==
=== Districts and borders ===
According to the Armenian geography Ashkharhatsuyts (attributed to Anania Shirakatsi, 7th century), Utik was the twelfth of the fifteen provinces (ashkharhs) of Greater Armenia, but belonged, at the time, to Caucasian Albania; the provinces of Utik and Artsakh had been lost by Armenia after its partition in the 4th century. According to Ashkharatsuyts, Utik consisted of eight districts (gavar’s in Armenian): Aran-rot (in the valley of the river Goranchay), Tri (later Jraberd, in the valley of the river Tartar), Rot-Parsean (possibly around the confluence of the Kura and Arax or between the Trtu/Tartar and Khachen/Khachinchay), Aghve (Ałuē, around modern Gülüstan), Tus-Kustak (around Tavush fortress, modern Tovuz), Gardman (modern Qazax District), Shakashen (around modern Ganja), and Uti Arandznak or Ut-rostak ('Uti Proper'). The province was bounded by the Kura River from the north and east, separating it from Albania. In the southeast, the river Arax divided it from Paytakaran. It was bounded by Artsakh from the west, with the border between the two extending along the foothills of the Karabakh Mountains. Although the Ashkharhatsuyts only mentions Utik's districts, the province was actually divided into three principalities: Utik (consisting of the districts of Uti Arandznak, Aghve, and possibly Tri and Rot-Parsean), Gardman (consisting of the districts of Gardman and Tus-Kustak), and Shakashen (consisting of the districts of Shakashen and Tus-Kustak). It is unknown whether this reflects some Albanian or Armenian administrative situation (for example, the primacy of the princes of Utik over the other two) or the decision of the author of the Ashkharhatsuyts to merge the principalities into one province for simplicity's sake. Additionally, the districts of Tri and Rot-Parsean may have formed a separate principality of the Gargarians during the Arsacid period.

The northwestern part of Utik is predominantly an impregnable mountainous region, abundant in forests and alpine meadows. The lowland plains on the right bank of the Kura River, stretching to the confluence of the Kura and Aras rivers, form a fertile plain. The southeastern portion of Utik constitutes a section of the Mughan plain. The east-central part of Utik is mentioned by Tovma Artsruni as the Plain of the Gargarites, while the northwestern part is known as the Shakashen or Sakasene plain. The Gaga plain is located in the region of the lower reaches of the Aghstev River. Numerous rivers and streams flow through Utik, most of which are tributaries of the Kura (Shamkir, Aghstev, Hakhum, Tavush, Zakam, Banants, Voskanapar or Gandzak, Kurak, Geran, Barak, Tartar, Khachenaget, Qarqarcay, etc.). Since ancient times, Utik was renowned for its iron, copper, petroleum, gold, silver, and alum mines. Currently, the territory of Utik is also known for deposits of sulfur pyrites, manganese, barite, gypsum, kaolin, quartzites, building stones, and other minerals. It possesses numerous mineral water springs, which are primarily concentrated in the basins of the Aghstev, Tavush, and Zakam rivers. The mountainous regions of Utik are densely forested. The fauna of Utik is equally diverse. Historical accounts indicate that in ancient times, lions, leopards, and other similar animals were also found in Utik. The lowland regions of Utik have a temperate warm semi-desert and dry steppe climate. Annual precipitation ranges from 300 to 600 mm, reaching up to 900 mm in certain northwestern mountainous areas; the average January temperature ranges from 3°C to -3°C, while the average July temperature is between 20°C and 27°C or higher.

=== Topography ===
In terms of topography, Utik is divided into two areas: lowland and mountainous. The lowland regions extended along the coastal and riparian areas of the Kura and Tartar rivers, while the mountainous districts were located within the Lesser Caucasus region. In his work, Strabo wrote that Utik was best known for its fertile lands, horse breeding, and particularly its pomegranate and olive orchards, noting that the entirety of their irrigation was carried out using the waters of the Kura River.

=== Settlements ===
Utik was the site of the settlement of Khaghkhagh, which Agathangelos calls the "winter quarters of the Armenian kings" but which Elishe and Movses Kaghankatvatsi call the quarters of the Albanian kings. Its location is uncertain. (Note: Harutiunian considers the juncture of the Kura and its tributary the Zayamchay (Zakam) to be a likely location. Other proposed locations are the confluence of the Kura and the Aghstafa or further up the Aghstafa.) Yeremian places the city of Ainiana, mentioned by Strabo as being located in Ouitia, at the site of modern Aghdam, but, in Hewsen's view, this is also uncertain. Utik was the site of a settlement called Tigranakert, built by Tigranes I in the 2nd–1st century BC. It may have been located in Gardman in the valley of the Shamkir (Shamkor) River. Tigranakert of Artsakh is placed in Utik in some sources. The city of Partaw (near today's Barda) was built in the province in the 5th century and grew into a major commercial center in the following centuries. The city of Baylakan was built there under the Sasanian king Kavad I. After the Arab conquests, the city of Ganja was built in the region in the 9th century, possibly on the site of a preexisting town.

== History ==
The territory of Utik was controlled by the Achaemenid Empire. Herodotus reports that the Outians were located in the fourteenth satrapy of that empire and that they formed part of the Persian army together with the Mykoi at Doriscus. The Outians and the Mykoi, identified with the Yutiya and Maka of Achaemenid inscriptions, may have been migrants from southeastern Iran, although, according to another view, these groups were only ever located in southeastern Iran. According to Hewsen, Utik seems to have been part of the satrapy of Media and the succeeding kingdom of Media Atropatene until the 2nd century BC, when, according to Strabo, Artaxias I of Greater Armenia conquered the lands of Syunik (Note: Strabo refers to Phauene, which some scholars read as *Sauene and identify with Syunik.) and Caspiane and the lands that lay between them, i.e., Utik and Artsakh. Some Armenian scholars like Babken Harutiunian and Asatur Mnatsakanian believe that Syunik and Utik were already controlled by Armenia under the Orontid dynasty and were reconquered by Artaxias I, but Hewsen writes that there is no evidence to support this claim. (Note: Elsewhere in the same work, however, Hewsen writes that it is possible that Orontid domains extended to the confluence of the Kura and the Arax.)

Utik remained a part of Armenia for some 500 years after Artaxias's conquest, although the Armenian-Albanian boundary along the Kura River was often overrun by armies of both countries. It was lost as a result of the Roman–Persian peace of 363 AD, but, according to the author of Buzandaran Patmut’iwnk’, in 370 AD the Armenian sparapet Mushegh Mamikonian defeated the Albanians and restored the frontier back to the river Kura. In 387 AD, the Sassanid Empire helped the Albanians to seize from the Kingdom of Armenia a number of provinces, including Utik. Although there is some evidence that suggests that Utik remained a part of the Persian-controlled kingdom of Armenia even after 387, it was definitely incorporated into Albania after the abolition of the Armenian kingdom in 428.

The Marzpanate of Albania in the 5th and 6th centuries

In the middle of the 5th century, by the order of the Persian king Peroz I, the king Vache of Caucasian Albania built in Utik the city initially called Perozapat, and later Partaw and Barda, and made it the capital of Caucasian Albania. (Partaw may have existed previously as a town or a village by that name.) According to another view, Peroz I constructed the city himself after deposing the ruling family of Albania. The princes of Utik, who formed part of the Armenian nobility, remained as rulers the province under Albanian and, later, Arab rule. After the fall of the Albanian kingdom in the early 6th century, it was not the princes of Utik, however, but those of Gardman who became the dominant princes of Albania. They were recognized as Presiding Princes of Albania by the Byzantine emperor Heraclius in 628 and remained in this position until 822. In 922, Utik was annexed by the Bagratid kingdom of Armenia, but this included only part of the province's historical territory. According to Cyril Toumanoff, the descendants of the princes of Utik were present in southern Artsakh as late as the 11th century.

== Population ==
According to many scholars, the name Utik derives from the name of the ancient Udis/Utis, who, in their view, lived on both sides of the Kura or were a distinct tribe related to the Caucasian Albanian tribes living on the right side of the Kura. The ancient Udis/Utis have traditionally been considered the ancestors of the modern-day Udi people, who speak a Lezgic language closely related to (but possibly not directly descended from) the Caucasian Albanian language. However, different views exist about the exact relationship between the ancient groups called some variation of Udi/Uti, the modern-day Udis, and the toponym Utik. Schulze has suggested that the ethnonyms derive from a much older, possibly descriptive toponym referring to the lowlands between the Kura River, the Arax, and the mountains of Karabakh and that Udi/Uti did not necessarily refer to any specific ethnic group, but rather the inhabitants of that region. As for the modern-day Udis, Schulze writes that "[t]he fact that today the Udis name themselves udi- is perhaps related to the adaption of the ethnonymic tradition in the former Uti region [i.e., Utik]." Aleksan Hakobyan considers it likely that Udi/Uti was a common term among speakers of Northeast Caucasian languages used to designate one's own or a different group (like *arya and *an-arya among Iranian peoples), hence why it was apparently applied to a number of Lezgic-speaking groups or their neighbors. He hypothesizes that the province received its name because of its proximity to the Utis/Udis on the other side of the Kura, or because a distinct Lezgic-speaking people by that name had once lived there and had been Armenized.

Differing views exist about the timing of the presence of Armenians in Utik. The issue has occupied a prominent place in the disputes between Armenian and Azerbaijani scholars about the history of Caucasian Albania and the historical eastern regions of Armenia. In 1958, Yeremian expressed the view that the people of Utik came under Armenian rule in the 2nd century BC and were assimilated into the Armenians by the 4th–6th centuries AD, but subsequent works by Armenian scholars have argued that Armenians inhabited the right bank of the Kura from a much earlier period. Aleksan Hakobyan argues that Utik was wholly Armenian from at least the 4th century BC. Bagrat Ulubabyan asserts that the people of Utik were not Armenized but were simply Armenians. This latter view has been criticized by some other Armenian scholars such as Paruyr Muradyan. The early Armenian historian Movses Khorenatsi writes that the princes of Utik descended from Sisak, a descendant of the legendary Armenian progenitor Hayk and the reputed ancestor of the princes of Syunik. While some Armenian scholars interpret this as an indication of the Armenian origin of the princes, Toumanoff argues that this merely indicates that they had ruled the area since time immemorial. Regarding the Arsacid period, Hewsen writes that "[i]t seems likely that except for Siwnik', eastern Armenia was not much more than armenized, if that" and that the Utians were "almost certainly a Caucasian tribe." Historian Tim Greenwood writes that by the time of the composition of the Ashkharhatsuyts (c. 7th century), Utik, along with the provinces of Artsakh and Gugark, were no longer administratively part of Armenia but "they were evidently remembered as once having been Armenian and may have still contained communities who thought of themselves and the settlements they occupied as Armenian."

According to Babken Harutiunian, under Arab rule a large part of the Armenian population of Utik left for Artsakh or was concentrated in the western part of the province. The territory of western Utik was the site of many important centers of medieval Armenian culture and learning, such as the monastic schools of Khoranashat and Kayenadzor. Several important medieval Armenian scholars hailed from this region, such as Vanakan Vardapet and Kirakos Gandzaketsi. Later, in the 17th and 18th centuries, Armenians largely left the flatlands of historical Utik for nearby mountainous areas and foothills, as well as the urban center of Ganja.

== See also ==
- List of regions of ancient Armenia
