= Mihranids =

Iranian ruling family

The Mihranids were an Iranian family which ruled several regions of Caucasus from 330 to 821. They claimed to be of Sasanian Persian descent but were of Parthian origin.

== History ==
The dynasty was founded when a certain Mihran, a distant relative of Sasanian, settled in the region of Gardman in Utik. He was probably a member of a branch of the Mihranid family which was listed among the Seven Great Houses of Iran, and whose two other lines ruled Iberia (Chosroid Dynasty) and Gogarene/Gugark.

It is uncertain how the Mihranids became Arranshahs (princes of Albania). Their ancestor, Mihran, was said to have received the region of Gardman by the Sasanian monarch Khosrow II (r. 590–628). In c. 600, the Mihranids who exterminated all of the members of the Aranshahik dynasty with the exception of a certain Zarmihr, who was related to the Mihranids through marriage. This was due to the Aranshahiks still having some authority in Albania, which they had originally ruled until their overthrow in the 1st-century. The Mihranids then conquered all of Albania and assumed the title of Arranshah, but without embracing its royal status. The head of the family's full titulature was thus "Lord of Gardman and Prince of Albania".

The most prominent representatives of the family in the 7th century were Varaz Grigor, his son Javanshir, and Varaz-Tiridates I. Mihranids assumed a Persian title of Arranshahs (i.e. shahs of Arran, Persian name of Albania). The family's rule came to an end after the assassination of Varaz-Tiridates II by Nerseh Pilippean in 822–23.

Subsequently Sahl Smbatean, a descendant of the aforementioned Arranshahik (Eṙanšahik) family, assumed the title of Arranshah and ruled significant part of Caucasian Albania.

== Mihranids of Gogarene ==
- Peroz (330–361)
- Unknown (361–394)
- Bakur I (394–400)
- Arshusha I (400–430)
- Bakur II (430–455)
- Arshusha II (455–470)
- Varsken (470–482)
- Arshusha III (482–540)
- Arshusha IV (540–608)
- Vahram-Arshusha V (608–627)
- Arshusha VI (???–748)

== Mihranids of Gardman ==
- Peroz (330–361)
- Khurs (361–430)
- Barzabod (430–440)
- Varaz-Bakur (440–450)
- Mihr (450–480)
- Armayel (480–510)
- Vard I (510–540)
- Vardan I (540–570)
- Vard II (570–600)

== Mihranids of Caucasian Albania ==
- Varaz Grigor (628–636)
- Javanshir (636–680)
- Varaz-Tiridates I (680–705)
  - Shiruye (699–704, usurper)
- Vardan II (705–740)
- Narseh-Dzndak (740–770)
- Gagikh II (770–790)
- Stephanos I (790–821)
- Varaz-Tiridates II (821–822)

== Sources ==
- Baumer, Christoph (2021). History of the Caucasus: Volume 1: At the Crossroads of Empires. Bloomsbury Publishing. ISBN 978-1788310079.
- Bosworth, C. E. (1986). "Arrān". In Yarshater, Ehsan (ed.). Encyclopædia Iranica. Vol. II/5: Armenia and Iran IV–Art in Iran I. London and New York: Routledge & Kegan Paul. pp. 520–522. ISBN 978-0-71009-105-5.
- Daryaee, Touraj (2014). Sasanian Persia: The Rise and Fall of an Empire. I.B.Tauris. ISBN 978-0-85771-666-8.
- Dowsett, Charles (1961). The History of the Caucasian Albanians. Oxford University. OCLC 445781.
- Gadjiev, Murtazali (2022). "Religious Life in Caucasian Albania: Christianity vs Zoroastrianism / Религиозная жизнь в Кавказской Албании: христианство vs зороастризм". журнала Вестник древней истории (Herald of Ancient History). 82 (3): 672–699.
- Greenwood, Tim (2022). "Negotiating the North: Armenian Perspectives on the Conquest Era". The Historian of Islam at Work: Essays in Honor of Hugh N. Kennedy. Brill. pp. 591–613. ISBN 978-90-04-52523-8.
- Hacikyan, Agop Jack (2002). The Heritage of Armenian Literature: From the sixth to the eighteenth century. Vol. II. Wayne State University Press. ISBN 0814330231.
- Howard-Johnston, James (2010). Witnesses to a World Crisis: Historians and Histories of the Middle East in the Seventh Century. Oxford University Press. ISBN 978-0-19-920859-3.
- Howard-Johnston, James (2020). "Caucasian Albania and its historian". In Hoyland, Robert (ed.). From Albania to Arrān: The East Caucasus between the Ancient and Islamic Worlds (ca. 330 BCE–1000 CE). Gorgias Press. pp. 351–371. ISBN 978-1463239886.
- Hoyland, Robert G. (2014). In God's Path: The Arab Conquests and the Creation of an Islamic Empire. Oxford University Press. ISBN 978-0-19-991636-8.
- Rapp, Stephen H. (1997). Imagining History at the Crossroads: Persia, Byzantium, and the Architects of the Written Georgian Past, vol. 1. University of Michigan. ISBN 9780591308280.
- Russell, James R. (2020). Poets, Heroes, and their Dragons (2 vols). Brill. ISBN 978-9004460065.
- Vacca, Alison (2020). "Buldān al-Rān: The Many Definitions of Caucasian Albania in The Early Abbasid Period". In Hoyland, Robert (ed.). From Albania to Arrān: The East Caucasus between the Ancient and Islamic Worlds (ca. 330 BCE–1000 CE). Gorgias Press. pp. 37–85. ISBN 978-1463239886.
- Shahbazi, A. Shapur (2005). "Sasanian dynasty". Encyclopaedia Iranica, Online Edition.
- Toumanoff, Cyril (1963). Studies in Christian Caucasian history. Georgetown University Press.
- Vacca, Alison (2022). "Arrān". In Fleet, Kate; Krämer, Gudrun; Matringe, Denis; Nawas, John; Rowson, Everett (eds.). Encyclopaedia of Islam (3rd ed.). Brill Online. ISSN 1873-9830.
- Zuckerman, Constantin (2020). "The Caucasus between Byzantium and the Caliphate (9th-10th c.)". In Hoyland, Robert (ed.). From Albania to Arrān: The East Caucasus between the Ancient and Islamic Worlds (ca. 330 BCE–1000 CE). Gorgias Press. pp. 149–191. doi:10.31826/9781463239893. ISBN 978-1463239886. S2CID 241889781.
