= Gardman =

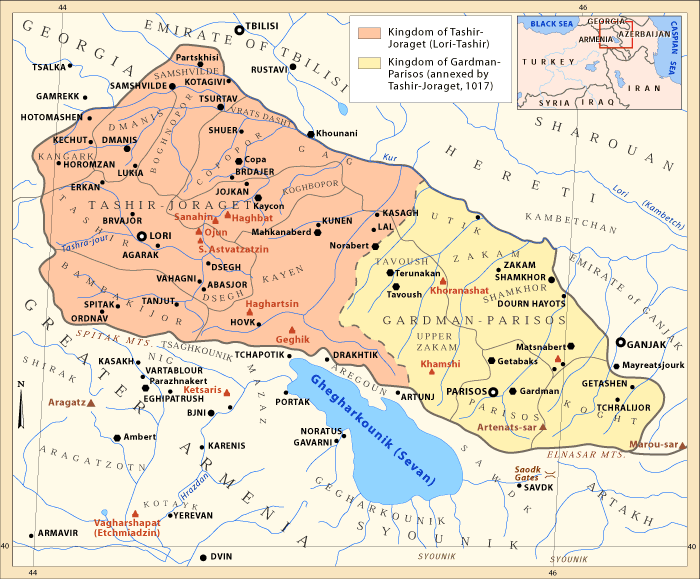
The Kingdom of Gardman-Parisos (yellow) in 1017 when it was acquired by the Kingdom of Lori (red).

Gardman (Armenian: Գարդման), also known as Gardmank' or Gardmanadzor, was one of the eight cantons of the ancient province of Utik' in the Kingdom of Armenia and simultaneously, together with the canton of Tuch'katak, an Armenian principality. It roughly corresponded within the Gazakh, Shamkir, Aghstafa, Dashkasan, Goygol, Tovuz, Gadabay districts of modern-day Azerbaijan and the original Tavush Region of Armenia. Gardman was also the name of the central fortress of the canton.

== History ==
In the view of historian Robert H. Hewsen, the name Gardman might be of Georgian origin, but there is another claim that it has an Indo-Iranian origin as the word gard in many older Indo-Iranian languages, such as Pahlavi, Parthian, Avestan and even modern Persian means "stronghold" or "housing", as well as the fact that the term Parisos originated from the Greek term Parrasioi(Greek: Παρράσιοι), an Iranian tribe. Many contemporary Armenian authors referred to Gardman as a part of the ashkharh ('province, land') of Artsakh. During the reign of the Arsacid kings of Armenia (66–428 A.D.), Gardman was the seat of the nakharars of Utik'. For this reason, Utik' was sometimes called Gardmants'vots' ishkhanut'yun, or the principality of the Gardmanians. Gardman was acquired by Caucasian Albania in 387 following the partition of Armenia. In the seventh century, the local house of Gardman was replaced by the Mihranid family (of Persian or Parthian origin), which later became the ruling dynasty in the region of Arran. During the rule of the Mihranids (7th-8th centuries), the region of Utik' came to be referred to as Gardman.

The region was conquered by the Arabs in 855. Contemporary Armenian historians repeatedly noted the presence of two well known locations in Gardman: a fortress called Getabakk' (in the current-day Azerbaijani region of Gadabay) and a copper mine.

In 982, Gardman and Parisos, the northern district of Artsakh, became the small Armenian kingdom of Parisos, which lasted until 1017 and thereafter became part of the Kingdom of Lori. In 1601, the princely family of Melik-Shahnazaryan established the melikdom of Gardman. The ruling family belonged to a branch of the House of Khachen, and their residence was in the village of Voskanapat (and for this reason, the statelet was sometimes referred to as the Voskanapat melikdom). The territorial rights of the meliks were confirmed after the Russian Empire took control of the region in the early nineteenth century.

== Bibliography ==
- Bosworth, C. E. (1986). "Arrān". In Yarshater, Ehsan (ed.). Encyclopædia Iranica (Online ed.). Encyclopædia Iranica Foundation.
- Hakobyan, Tadevos Kh. (2007). Hayastani patmakan ashkharhagrutʻyun (in Armenian). Yerevan State University Press. pp. 243–244.
- Hewsen, Robert H (2001). Armenia: A Historical Atlas. Chicago: University of Chicago Press. pp. 100–103, 118–121. ISBN 0-226-33228-4.
- Ulubabyan, B. (1977). "Gardman". In Simonyan, Abel (ed.). Soviet Armenian Encyclopedia (in Armenian). Vol. 2. Yerevan. p. 700.
