= Caucasian Albania =

Ancient state in the Caucasus

- 2nd century BC – 8th century AD
- Caucasian Albania in the 5th and 6th centuries
- Status: Initial state/s unknown; later vassal kingdom and province of the Sasanian Empire and the Rashidun, Umayyad and Abbasid Caliphates
- Capital: Kabalak (Qabala); Partaw (Barda)
- Common languages: Caucasian Albanian, Parthian, Middle Persian, Armenian
- Religion: Caucasian Albanian paganism, Church of Caucasian Albania, Zoroastrianism
- Historical era: Antiquity
  - Established: 2nd century BC
  - Disestablished: 8th century AD
- Today part of: Azerbaijan; Georgia; Armenia

Caucasian Albania is a modern exonym for a former state located in ancient times in the Caucasus, mostly overlapping the region of present-day Azerbaijan. The modern endonyms for the area are Aghwank and Aluank, the Lezgic people who live in modern day north Azerbaijan and southern Dagestan, are often associated as modern day descendants of the inhabitants of historic Albania.

The name Albania is derived from the Ancient Greek name Ἀλβανία and Latin Albanía, created from Greek sources that incorrectly translated the Armenian language. The prefix "Caucasian" is used to avoid confusion with Albania in the Balkans, which has no geographical or historical connections to Caucasian Albania.

Little is known of the region's prehistory, including the origins of Caucasian Albania as a geographical and/or ethnolinguistic concept. In the 1st century BC and the 1st century AD, the area south of the Greater Caucasus and north of the Lesser Caucasus was divided between Caucasian Albania in the east, Caucasian Iberia in the center, Colchis in the west, Armenia in the southwest and Atropatene to the southeast.

In 252, Caucasian Albania acknowledged the suzerainty of the Sasanian Empire, appearing among its provinces in Shapur I's inscription at the Ka'ba-ye Zartosht. The kingdom would remain an integral part of the empire until its fall. By the end of the 3rd century, the kings of Caucasian Albania were replaced with an Arsacid family, and would later be succeeded by another Iranian royal family in the 5th century AD, the Mihranids.

== Geonyms ==
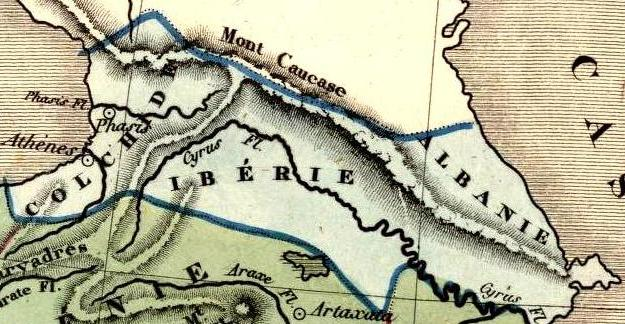
1838 map: Colchis, Iberia and Albania

Aghuank (Old Armenian: Աղուանք Ałuankʿ, Modern Armenian: Աղվանք Aġvank’) is the Armenian name for Caucasian Albania. Armenian authors mention that the name derived from the word "ału" («աղու») meaning amiable in Armenian. The term Aghuank is polysemous and is also used in Armenian sources to denote the region between the Kur and Araxes rivers as part of Armenia. In the latter case it is sometimes used in the form "Armenian Aghuank" or "Hay-Aghuank".

The Armenian historian of the region, Movses Kaghankatvatsi, who left the only more or less complete historical account about the region, explains the name Aghvank as a derivation from the word ału (Armenian for sweet, soft, tender), which, he said, was the nickname of Caucasian Albania's first governor Arran and referred to his lenient personality. Movses Kaghankatvatsi and other ancient sources explain Arran or Arhan as the name of the legendary founder of Caucasian Albania (Aghvan) or even of the Iranian tribe known as Alans (Alani), who in some versions was a son of Noah's son Yafet. James Darmesteter, translator of the Avesta, compared Arran with Airyana Vaego which he also considered to have been in the Araxes-Ararat region, although modern theories tend to place this in the east of Iran.

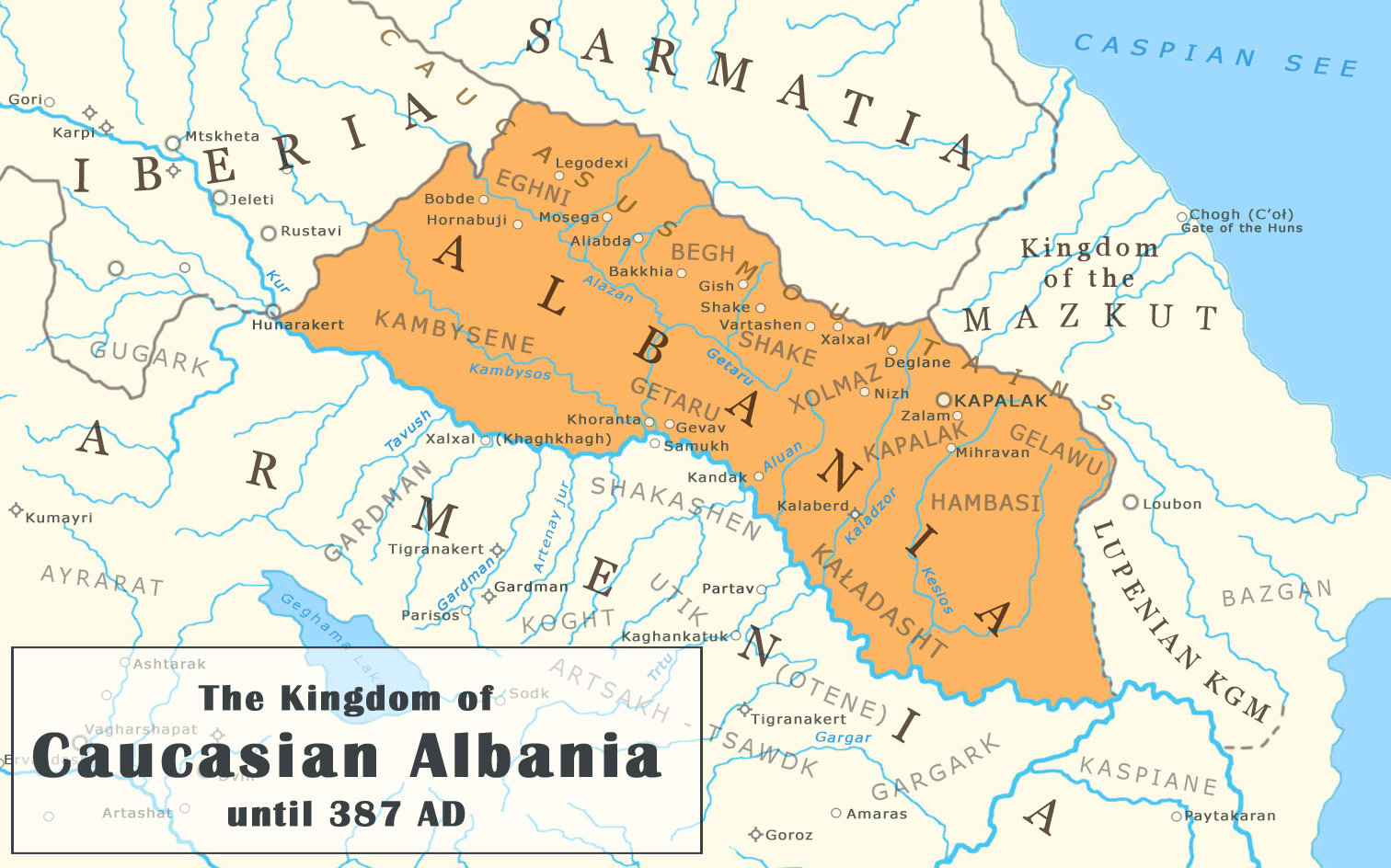
Caucasian Albania until 387

The Parthian name for the region was Ardhan (Middle Persian: Arran). The Arabic was ar-Rān. In Georgian, it was known as რანი (Rani). In Ancient Greek, it was called Ἀλβανία Albanía. What its inhabitants were called is unknown.

== Geography ==
In pre-Islamic times, Caucasian Albania/Arran was a wider concept than that of post-Islamic Arran. Ancient Arran covered all of eastern Transcaucasia, which included most of the territory of the modern-day Azerbaijan Republic and part of the territory of Dagestan. However, in post-Islamic times the geographic notion of Arran reduced to the territory between the Kura and Aras rivers.

Ancient Caucasian Albania lay on the south-eastern part of the Greater Caucasus mountains. It was bounded by Caucasian Iberia (present-day Georgia) to the west, by Sarmatia to the north, by the Caspian Sea to the east, and by the provinces of Artsakh and Utik in Armenia to the west along the Kura river. These boundaries, though, were probably never static—at times the territory of Caucasian Albania included land to the west of the Kura river.

Albania or Arran in Islamic times was a triangle of land, lowland in the east and mountainous in the west, formed by the junction of the Kura and Aras rivers, Mil plain and parts of the Mughan plain, and in the pre-Islamic times, corresponded roughly to the territory of the modern-day Republic of Azerbaijan.

The districts of Albania were:

- Cambysene
- Getaru
- Elni/Xeni
- Begh
- Shake
- Xolmaz
- Kapalak
- Hambasi
- Gelavu
- Hejeri
- Kaladasht

The kingdom's capital in antiquity was Qabala (Gabala; Kapalak).

Classical sources are unanimous in making the Kura River (Cyros) the frontier between Armenia and Albania after the conquest of the territories on the right bank of Kura by Armenians in the 2nd century BC.

The original territory of Albania was approximately 23,000 km^{2}. After 387 AD the territory of Caucasian Albania, sometimes referred to by scholars as "Greater Albania," grew to about 45,000 km^{2}. In the 5th century the capital was transferred to Partav in Utik', reported to have been built in the mid-5th century by the King Vache II of Albania, but according to M. L. Chaumont, it existed earlier as an Armenian city.

In a medieval chronicle "Ajayib-ad-Dunia", written in the 13th century by an unknown author, Arran is said to have been 30 farsakhs (200 km) in width, and 40 farsakhs (270 km) in length. All the right bank of the Kura River until it joined with the Aras was attributed to Arran (the left bank of the Kura was known as Shirvan). The boundaries of Arran have shifted throughout history, sometimes encompassing the entire territory of the present-day Republic of Azerbaijan, and at other times only parts of the South Caucasus. In some instances, Arran was a part of Armenia.

Medieval Islamic geographers gave descriptions of Arran in general, and of its towns, which included Barda, Beylagan, and Ganja, along with others.

== Ethnogenesis ==
Originally, at least some of the Caucasian Albanians probably spoke Lezgic languages close to those found in modern Dagestan; overall, though, as many as 26 different languages may have been spoken in Caucasian Albania.

According to the linguist Jost Gippert, the ancestors of the peoples of the Lezgic language group—including the Budukhs, Kryts, Lezgins, Rutulians, Tsakhurs, and others—historically lived in the territory of Caucasian Albania.

After the Caucasian Albanians were Christianized in the 4th century, part of the population was assimilated by the Armenians (who dominated in the provinces of Artsakh and Utik that were earlier detached from the Kingdom of Armenia) and Georgians (in the north), while the eastern parts of Caucasian Albania were Islamized and absorbed by Iranian and subsequently Turkic peoples (modern Azerbaijanis). Small remnants of this group continue to exist independently, and are known as the Udi people. The pre-Islamic population of Caucasian Albania might have played a role in the ethnogenesis of a number of modern ethnicities, including the Azerbaijanis of Qabala, Zaqatala, Shaki, and Oguz; the Armenians of Oghuz and Shaki; the Georgians of Kakhetia and Hereti (Ingiloy); the Rutulians, the Laks, the Lezgins and the Tsakhurs of Daghestan.

=== Alphabet and languages ===
==== Caucasian Albanian language ====
According to Armenian medieval historians Movses Khorenatsi, Movses Kaghankatvatsi and Koryun, the Caucasian Albanian (the Armenian name for the language is Aghvaneren, the native name of the language is unknown) alphabet was created by Mesrob Mashtots, the Armenian monk, theologian and translator who is also credited with creating the Armenian alphabet. This alphabet was used to write down the Udi language, which was probably the main language of the Caucasian Albanians.

Koryun, a pupil of Mesrob Mashtots, in his book The Life of Mashtots, wrote about how his tutor created the alphabet:

Then there came and visited them an elderly man, an Albanian named Benjamin. And he (Mashtots) inquired and examined the barbaric diction of the Albanian language, and then through his usual God-given keenness of mind invented an alphabet, which he, through the grace of Christ, successfully organized and put in order.

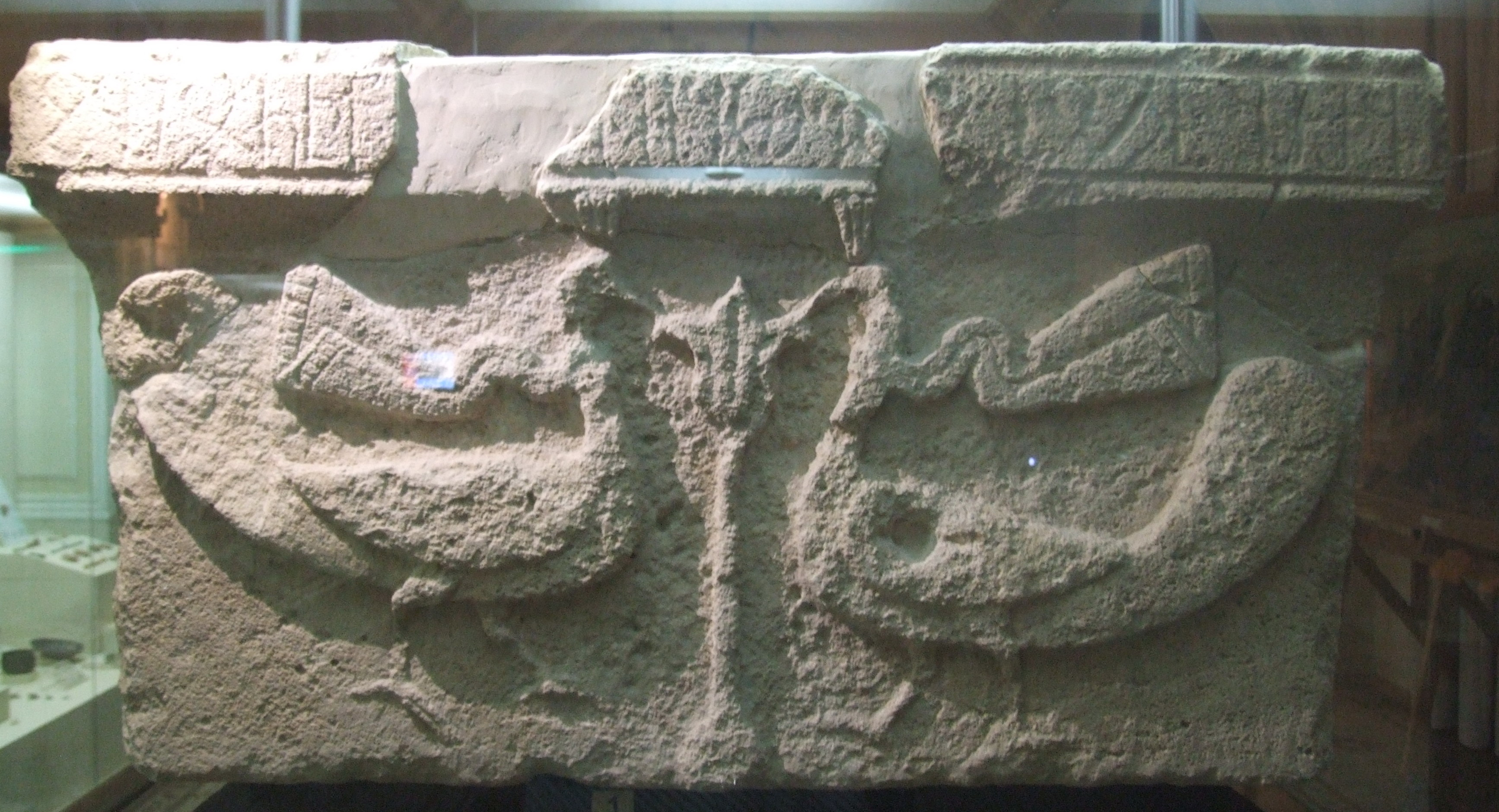
A column capital with an Albanian inscription from a 7th-century church in Mingachevir (Azerbaijan State Museum of History)

A Caucasian Albanian alphabet of fifty-two letters, bearing resemblance to Georgian, Ethiopian and Armenian characters, (Note: See sample of script with letters that resemble other alphabets, specifically Georgian (19 letters), Ethiopian (14 letters) and Armenian (10 letters) in "The Albanian Script: The Process How Its Secrets Were Revealed," by Zaza Aleksidze and Betty Blair) survived through a few inscriptions, and an Armenian manuscript dating from the 15th century. This manuscript, Matenadaran No. 7117, first published by Ilia Abuladze in 1937 is a language manual, presenting different alphabets for comparison – Armenian alphabet, Greek, Latin, Syriac, Georgian, Coptic, and Caucasian Albanian among them. The alphabet was titled: "Ałuanicʿ girn ē" (Armenian: Աղուանից գիրն Է, meaning, "These are Albanian letters").

In 1996, Zaza Aleksidze of the Georgian Centre of Manuscripts discovered at Saint Catherine's Monastery at Mount Sinai, Egypt, a text written on parchment that had been reused in a Georgian palimpsest. In 2001 Aleksidze identified its script as Caucasian Albanian, and the text as an early lectionary dating to perhaps before the 6th century. Many of the letters discovered in it were not in the Albanian alphabet listed in the 15th-century Armenian manuscript.

Muslim geographers Al-Muqaddasi, Ibn-Hawqal and Estakhri recorded that a language which they called Arranian was still spoken in the capital Barda and the rest of Arran in the 10th century.

==== Iranian languages ====
Iranian contact in the region goes back to the Median and Achaemenid times. During this Arsacid dynasty of Caucasian Albania, the Parthian language spread in the region. It is possible that the language and literature for administration and record-keeping of the imperial chancellery for external affairs naturally became Parthian, based on the Aramaic alphabet. According to Toumanoff: "the predominance of Hellenism, as under the Artaxiads, was now followed by a predominance of "Iranianism", and, symptomatically, instead of Greek, as before, Parthian became the language of the educated".

With the establishment of the Sassanids, Middle Persian, a closely related language to Parthian, became an official language of the Sassanid Empire. At this time, Persian enjoyed even more success than the Caucasian Albanian language and the region was greatly affected by Iran. According to Vladimir Minorsky: "The presence of Iranian settlers in Transcaucasia, and especially in the proximity of the passes, must have played an important role in absorbing and pushing back the aboriginal inhabitants. Such names as Sharvan, Layzan, Baylaqan, etc., suggest that the Iranian immigration proceeded chiefly from Gilan and other regions on the southern coast of the Caspian". The presence of the Persian language and Iranian culture continued during the Islamic era.

=== Religion ===
The original population of the Caucasus followed different pagan religions. Under Achaemenid, Parthian and especially Sassanid influence, Zoroastrianism also grew in the region. Christianity started to spread in the late 4th century in the Sassanid era.

The Arab conquest and the Chalcedonian crisis led to severe disintegration of the Church of Caucasian Albania. Starting from the 8th century, much of the local population converted to Islam. By the 11th century there already were conciliar mosques in Partaw, Qabala and Shaki; the cities that were the creed of Caucasian Albanian Christianity.

These Islamised groups would later be known as Lezgins and Tsakhurs or mix with the Turkic and Iranian population to form present-day Azeris, whereas those that remained Christian were gradually absorbed by Armenians or continued to exist on their own and be known as the Udi people.

The Caucasian Albanian tribes of Hereti were converted to Eastern Orthodoxy by Dinar, Queen of Hereti in the 10th century. The religious affairs of this small principality were now officially administered by the Georgian Orthodox Church. In 1010, Hereti became absorbed into the neighbouring Georgian kingdom of Kakheti. Eventually, in the early 12th century, these lands became part of the Georgian Kingdom under David the Builder finalising the process of their Georgianisation.

== History ==
The history of Albania before the 6th century BC is unknown.

=== Median and Achaemenid era ===
According to one hypothesis, Caucasian Albania was incorporated in the Median empire, as early as the 7th or 6th century BC. However, an increasing Persian influence on the region is usually believed to be connected with the defence of Persia's northern frontiers, from invading nomads. As early as the Achaemenid Empire, measures may have been taken to fortify the Caucasian passes. By the mid-6th century BC, Albania has been incorporated in the Achaemenid Empire; it was later controlled by the Achaemenid satrapy of Media. The building of fortifications and gates in and around Darband is traditionally ascribed to the Sassanid Empire.

=== Hellenistic era ===
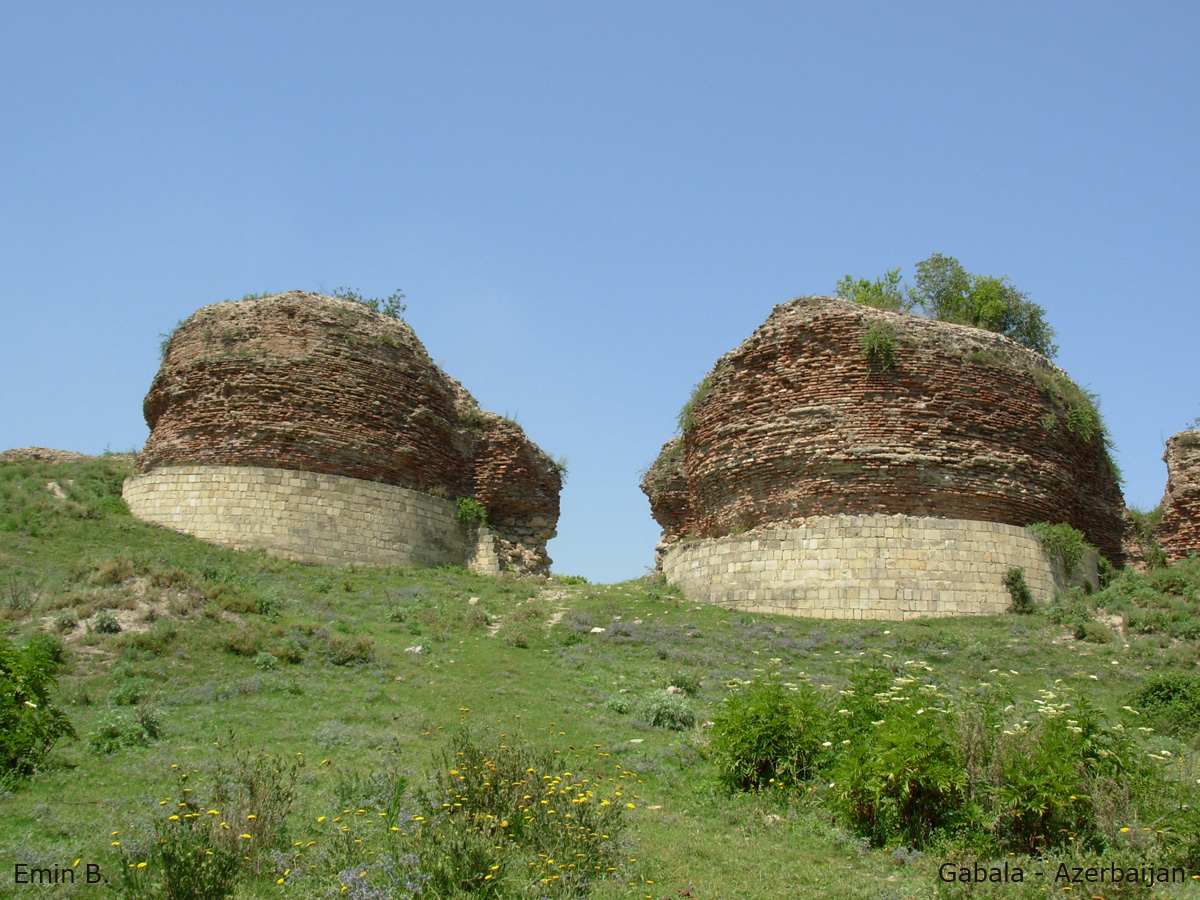
The ruins of the gates of the Albanian capital Qabala

The Greek historian Arrian mentions (perhaps anachronistically) the Caucasian Albanians for the first time in the battle of Gaugamela, where the Albanians, Medes, Cadussi and Sacae were under the command of Atropates. Albania first appears in history as a vassal state in the empire of Tigranes the Great of Armenia (95-56 BC). The kingdom of Albania emerged in the eastern Caucasus in 2nd or 1st century BC and along with the Georgians and Armenians formed one of the three nations of the Southern Caucasus. Albania came under strong Armenian religious and cultural influence.

Herodotus, Strabo, and other classical authors repeatedly mention the Caspians but do not seem to know much about them; they are grouped with other inhabitants of the southern shore of the Caspian Sea, like the Amardi, Anariacae, Cadusii, Albani (see below), and Vitii (Eratosthenes apud Strabo, 11.8.8), and their land (Caspiane) is said to be part of Albania (Theophanes Mytilenaeus apud Strabo, 11.4.5).

In the 2nd century BC parts of Albania were conquered by the Kingdom of Armenia, presumably from Medes (although possibly it was earlier part of Orontid Armenia).

The original population of the territories on the right bank of Kura before the Armenian conquest consisted of various autochthonous people. Ancient chronicles provide the names of several peoples that populated these districts, including the regions of Artsakh and Utik. These were Utians, Mycians, Caspians, Gargarians, Sakasenians, Gelians, Sodians, Lupenians, Balas[ak]anians, Parsians and Parrasians. According to Robert H. Hewsen, these tribes were "certainly not of Armenian origin", and "although certain Iranian peoples must have settled here during the long period of Persian and Median rule, most of the natives were not even Indo-Europeans". He also states that the several peoples of the right bank of Kura "were highly Armenicized and that many were actually Armenians per se cannot be doubted". Many of those people were still being cited as distinct ethnic entities when the right bank of Kura was acquired by the Caucasian Albanians in 387 AD.

=== Roman Empire ===
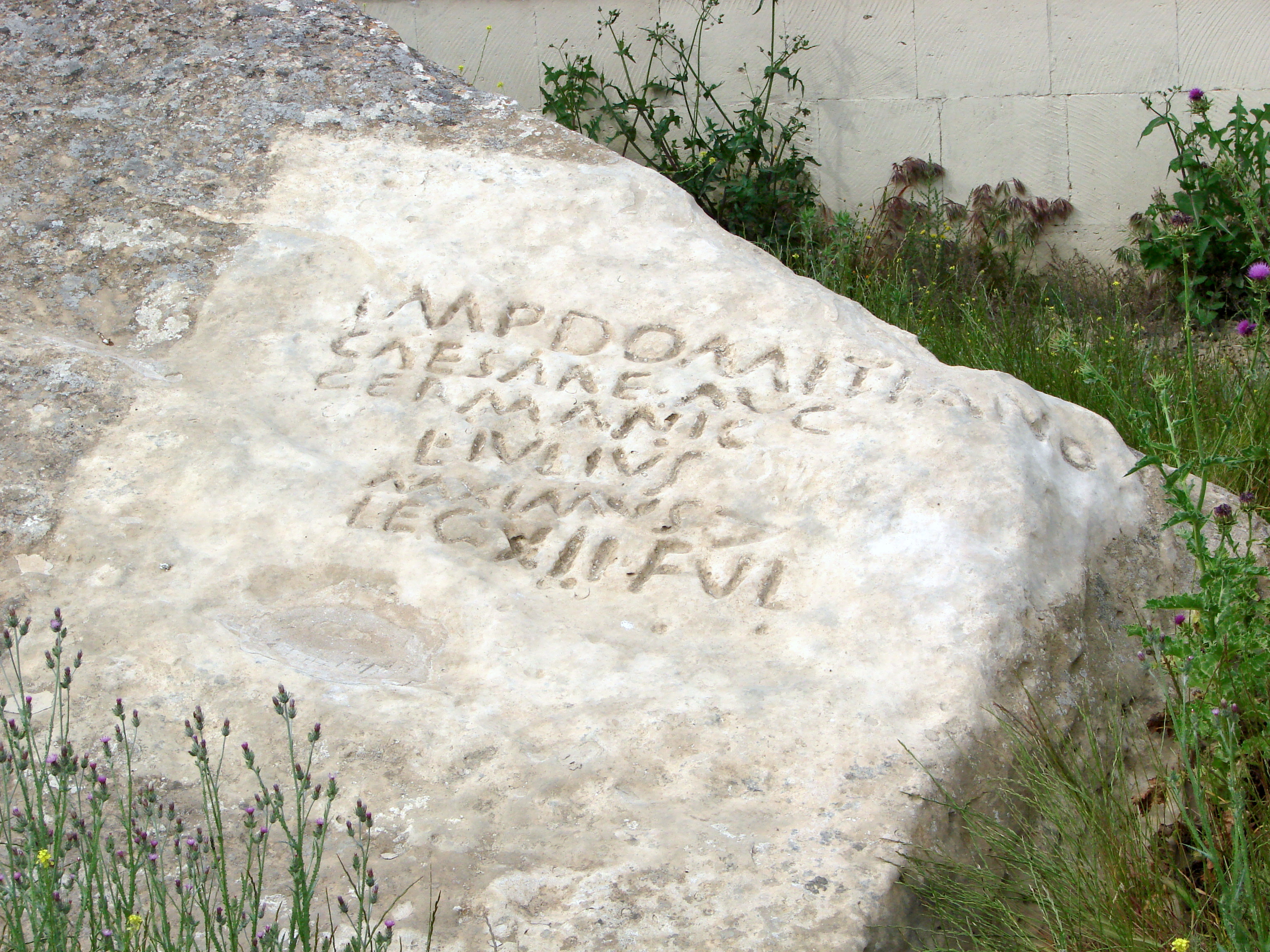
Roman inscription in Gobustan, Baku, left by Legio XII Fulminata

There was an enduring relation of Albania with Ancient Rome.

The Latin rock inscription close to Boyukdash mountain in Gobustan, Baku, which mentions Legio XII Fulminata, is the world's easternmost Latin inscription known. In Albania, Romans reached the Caspian Sea for the first time.

The Roman coins circulated in Caucasian Albania till the end of the 3rd century AD. Two denarii, which were unearthed in the 2nd-century BC layer, were minted by Clodius and Caesar. The coins of Augustus are ubiquitous. The Qabala treasures revealed the denarii of Otho, Vespasian, Trajan and Hadrian.

In 69-68 BC Lucullus, having overcome Armenian ruler Tigranes II, approached the borders of Caucasian Albania and was succeeded by Pompey.

After the 66-65 BC wintering Pompey launched the Iberian campaign. It is reported by Strabo upon the account of Theophanes of Mytilene who participated in it. As testified by Kamilla Trever, Pompey reached the Albanian border at modern Qazakh District of Azerbaijan. Igrar Aliyev showed that this region called Cambysene was inhabited mainly by stock-breeders at the time. When fording the Alazan river, he was attacked by forces of Oroezes, King of Albania, and eventually defeated them. According to Plutarch, Albanians "were led by a brother of the king, named Cosis, who as soon as the fighting was at close quarters, rushed upon Pompey himself and smote him with a javelin on the fold of his breastplate; but Pompey ran him through the body and killed him". Plutarch also reported that "after the battle, Pompey set out to march to the Caspian Sea, but was turned back by a multitude of deadly reptiles when he was only three days march distant, and withdrew into Lesser Armenia". The first kings of Albania were certainly the representatives of the local tribal nobility, to which attest their non-Armenian and non-Iranian names (Oroezes, Cosis and Zober in Greek sources).

The population of Caucasian Albania of the Roman period is believed to have belonged to either the Northeast Caucasian peoples or the South Caucasian peoples. According to Strabo, the Albanians were a group of 26 tribes which lived to the north of the Kura river and each of them had its own king and language. Sometime before the 1st century BC they federated into one state and were ruled by one king.

Strabo wrote of the Caucasian Albanians in the 1st century BC:

At the present time, indeed, one king rules all the tribes, but formerly the several tribes were ruled separately by kings of their own according to their several languages. They have twenty-six languages, because they have no easy means of intercourse with one another.

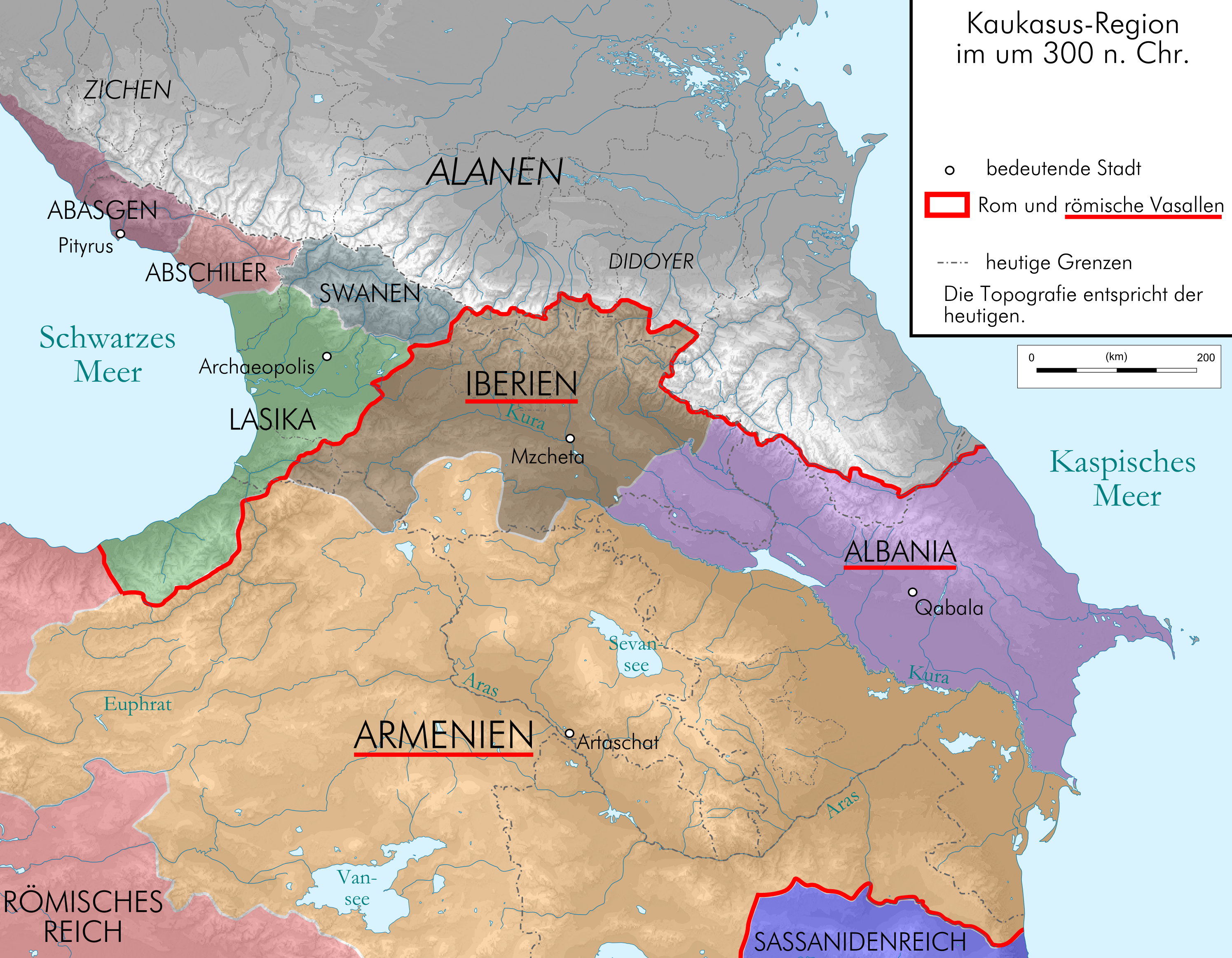
Caucasian Albania was a vassal of the Roman Empire around 300 AD.

Albania is also mentioned by Dionysius Periegetes (2nd or 3rd century AD) who describes Albanians as a nation of warriors, living by the Iberians and the Georgians.

In 1899 a silver plate featuring Roman toreutics was excavated near Azerbaijani village of Qalagah. The rock inscription near the south-eastern part of Boyukdash's foot (70 km from Baku) was discovered on June 2, 1948, by Azerbaijani archaeologist Ishag Jafarzadeh. The legend is IMPDOMITIANO CAESARE·AVG GERMANIC L·IVLIVS MAXIMVS> LEG XII·FVL. According to Domitian's titles in it, the related march took place between 84 and 96. The inscription was studied by Russian expert Yevgeni Pakhomov, who assumed that the associated campaign was launched to control the Derbent Gate and that the XII Fulminata has marched out either from Melitene, its permanent base, or Armenia, where it might have moved from before. Pakhomov supposed that the legion proceeded to the spot continually along the Aras River. The later version, published in 1956, states that the legion was stationing in Cappadocia by that time whereas the centurion might have been in Albania with some diplomatic mission because for the talks with the Eastern rulers the Roman commanders were usually sending centurions.

In 1953 twelve denarii of Augustus were unearthed. In 1958 one denarius, coined in c. 82 AD, was revealed in the Şamaxı trove.

During the reign of Roman emperor Hadrian (117-138) Albania was invaded by the Alans, an Iranian nomadic group. This invasion promoted an alliance between Rome and the Albanians that was reinforced under Antoninus Pius in 140 AD. Sassanians occupied the area around 240 AD but after a few years, the Roman Empire regained control of Caucasian Albania.

In 297 the treaty of Nisibis stipulated the reestablishment of the Roman protectorate over Caucasian Iberia and Albania. But fifty years later Rome lost the area that since then remained an integral part of the Sasanian Empire.

=== Parthian period ===
Under Parthian rule, Iranian political and cultural influence increased in the region. Whatever the sporadic suzerainty of Rome, the country was now a part—together with Iberia (East Georgia) and (Caucasian) Albania, where other Arsacid branches reigned—of a pan-Arsacid family federation. Culturally, the predominance of Hellenism, as under the Artaxiads, was now followed by a predominance of "Iranianism", and, symptomatically, instead of Greek, as before, Parthian became the language of the educated. An incursion in this era was made by the Alans who between 134 and 136 attacked Albania, Media, and Armenia, penetrating as far as Cappadocia. But Vologases persuaded them to withdraw, probably by paying them.

=== Sassanid period ===
In 252–253, Caucasian Albania, along with Caucasian Iberia and Greater Armenia, was conquered and annexed by the Sassanid Empire. Albania became a vassal state of the Sassanid Empire, but retained its monarchy; the Albanian king had no real power and most civil, religious, and military authority lay with the Sassanid marzban (military governor) of the territory. (Note: Nevertheless, "despite being one of the chief vassals of Sasanian Shahanshah, the Albanian king had only a semblance of authority, and the Sassanid marzban (military governor) held most civil, religious, and military authority.)

The Roman Empire again obtained control of Caucasian Albania as a vassal state for a few years around 300 AD, but then the Sassanids regained control and subsequently dominated the area for centuries until the Arab invasions.

Albania was mentioned among the Sassanid provinces listed in the trilingual inscription of Shapur I at Naqsh-e Rustam.

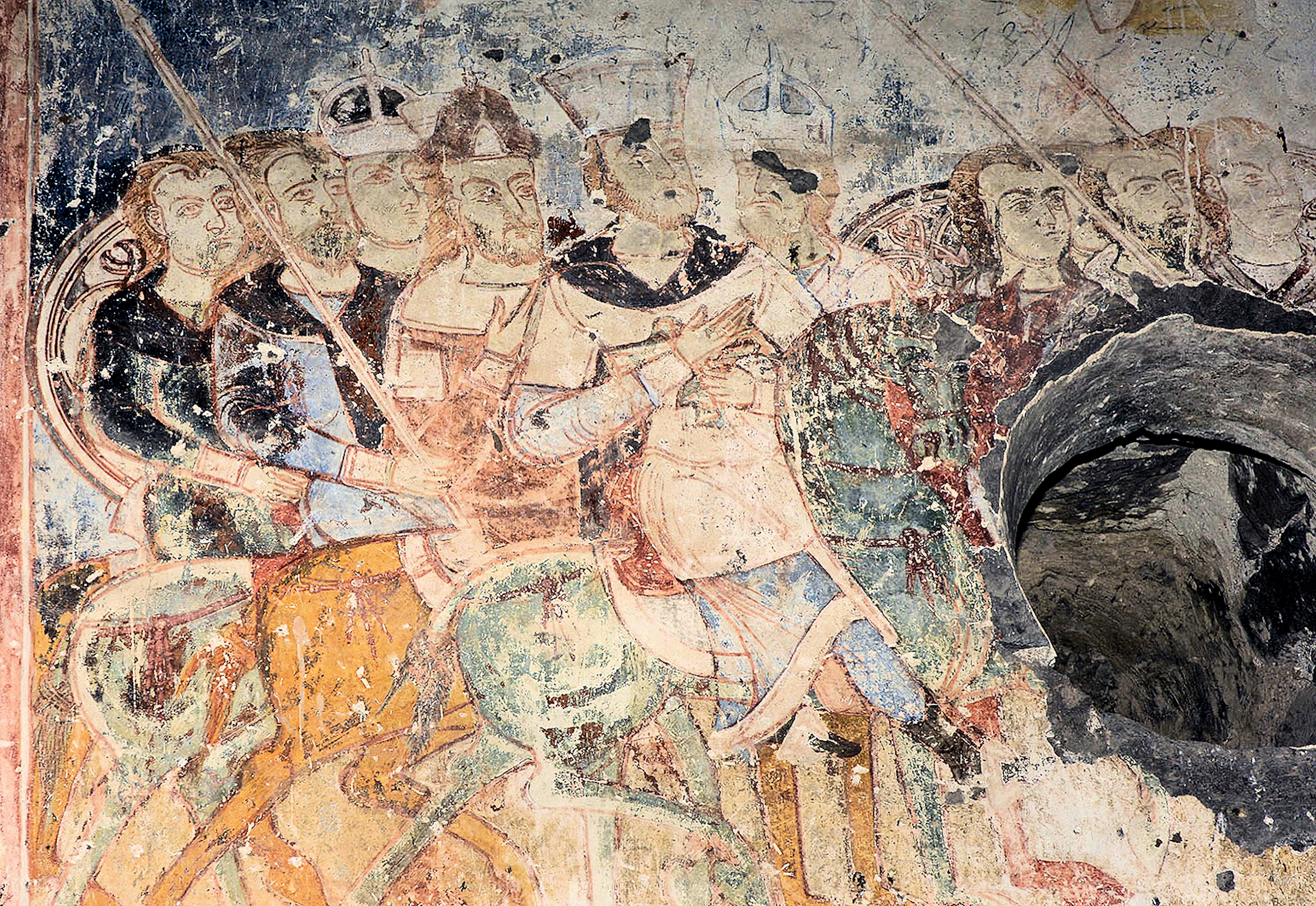
Departure of Tiridates III of Armenia with the Entourage of Georgian, Abkhazian and Caucasian Albania Kings for Their Christening c. 300. Zakarid church of Tigran Honents, Ani, 1215.

In the middle of the 4th century, King Urnayr of Albania arrived in Armenia and was baptized by Gregory the Illuminator, but Christianity spread in Albania only gradually, and the Albanian king remained loyal to the Sassanids. After the partition of Armenia between Byzantium and Persia (in 387 AD), Albania with Sassanid help was able to seize from Armenia all the right bank of the river Kura up to river Araxes, including Artsakh and Utik.

In the mid-5th century, the Sassanid King Yazdegerd II passed an edict requiring all the Christians in his empire to convert to Zoroastrianism, fearing that Christians might ally with Roman Empire, which had recently adopted Christianity as its official religion. This led to a rebellion of Albanians, along with Armenians and Georgians. At the Battle of Avarayr, the allied forces of Caucasian Albania, Georgia, and Armenia, devoted to Christianity, suffered defeat at the hands of the Sassanid army. Many of the Armenian nobility fled to the mountainous regions of Albania, particularly to Artsakh, which had become a center for resistance to Sassanid Persia. The religious center of the Albanian state also moved here. However, King Vache of Albania, a relative of Yazdegerd II, was forced to convert to Zoroastrianism, but soon thereafter converted back to Christianity.

According to The History of the Country of Albania, Peroz ordered the Albanian king Vache II to have the city of Perozapat ("the city of Peroz" or "Prosperous Peroz") constructed. However, this is unlikely as the Kingdom of Caucasian Albania had been abolished by Peroz after suppressing a revolt by Vache II in the mid-460s. The city was seemingly founded by Peroz himself after the removal of the ruling family in Caucasian Albania. Due to its more secure location, it was made the new residence of the Iranian marzbans. Albania remained kingless until 485, when Vachagan III (r. 485–510) was installed on the throne by Peroz's brother and successor Balash (r. 484–488). In 552, the seat of the Albanian Catholicos was also transferred to Partaw.

By the end of the 5th century, the ancient Arsacid royal house of Albania, a branch of the ruling dynasty of Parthia, became extinct, and in the 6th century, it was replaced by princes of the Persian or Parthian Mihranid family, who claimed descent from the Sassanids. They assumed the Persian title of Arranshah (i.e. the Shah of Arran, the Persian name of Albania). The ruling dynasty was named after its Persian founder Mihran, who was a distant relative of the Sasanians. The Mihranid dynasty survived under Muslim suzerainty until 821–22.

In the late 6th to early 7th centuries the territory of Albania became an arena of wars between Sassanid Persia, Byzantium, and the Khazar Khanate, the latter two very often acting as allies against Sassanid Persia. In 628, during the Third Perso-Turkic War, the Khazars invaded Albania, and their leader Ziebel declared himself Lord of Albania, levying a tax on merchants and the fishermen of the Kura and Araxes rivers "in accordance with the land survey of the kingdom of Persia". Most of Transcaucasia was under Khazar rule before the arrival of the Arabs. However, some other sources state that the Khazars later left the region because of political instability.

According to Peter Golden, "steady pressure from Turkic nomads was typical of the Khazar era, although there are no unambiguous references to permanent settlements", while Vladimir Minorsky stated that, in Islamic times, "the town of Qabala lying between Shirvan and Shakki was a place where Khazars were probably settled".

=== Impact of Armenian politics, culture and civilization ===
Armenian politics, culture and civilization played a critical role in the entire history of Caucasian Albania (Aghvank, in Armenian). This, due to the fact that after the partition of the Kingdom of Armenia by Persia and Byzantium in 387 AD, the Armenian provinces of Artsakh and Utik were disassociated from the Armenian kingdom and included by Persians into a single province (marzpanate) called Aghvank (Arran). This new unit included: the original Caucasian Albania, found between the River Kura and the Great Caucasus; tribes living along the Caspian shore; as well as Artsakh and Utik, two territories now detached from Armenia.

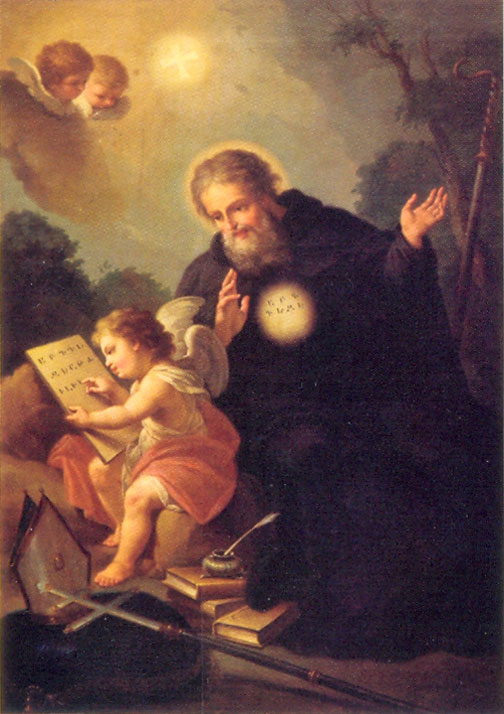
Armenian monk Mesrop Mashtots invented the Gargarean ("Caucasian Albanian") alphabet in the 5th century, after creating the Armenian script (art by Francesco Maggiotto, 1750–1805).

The Armenian medieval atlas Ashkharhatsuyts (Աշխարացույց), compiled in the 7th century by Anania Shirakatsi (Անանիա Շիրակացի, but sometimes attributed to Movses Khorenatsi as well), categorizes Artsakh and Utik as provinces of Armenia despite their presumed detachment from the Armenian Kingdom and their political association with Caucasian Albania and Persia at the time of his writing. Shirakatsi specifies that Artsakh and Utik are "now detached" from Armenia and included in "Aghvank," and he takes care to distinguish this new entity from the old "Aghvank strictly speaking" (Բուն Աղվանք) situated north of the river Kura. Because it was more homogeneous and more developed than the original tribes to the north of the Kura, the Armenian element took over Caucasian Albania's political life and was progressively able to impose its language and culture.

The Armenian population of Artsakh and Utik remained in place as did the entire political, social, cultural and military structure of the provinces. In the 5th century, early medieval historian Khorenatsi (Խորենացի) testifies that the population of Artsakh and Utik spoke Armenian, with the River Kura, in his words, marking the "boundary of Armenian speech" (... զեզերս հայկական խօսիցս). though this does not mean that its population consisted exclusively of ethnic Armenians.

Whatever little is known about Caucasian Albania after 387 AD comes from the Old Armenian text History of the Land of Aghvank (Պատմություն Աղվանից Աշխարհի) by the Armenian author Movses Kaghankatvatsi (also known as Movses Daskhurantsi), which in essence is the history of Armenia's provinces of Artsakh and Utik. Kaghankatvatsi, repeating Khorenatsi, mentions that the very name "Aghvank"/"Albania" is of Armenian origin, and relates it to the Armenian word "aghu" (աղու, meaning "kind," "benevolent". Khorenatsi states that "aghu" was a nickname given to Prince Arran, whom the Armenian King Vologases I (Vagharsh I) appointed as governor of northeastern provinces bordering on Armenia. According to a legend reported by Khorenatsi, Arran was a descendant of Sisak, the ancestor of the Siunids of Armenia's province of Syunik, and thus a great-grandson of the ancestral eponym of the Armenians, the Forefather Hayk. Kaghankatvatsi and another Armenian author, Kirakos Gandzaketsi, confirm Arran's belonging to Hayk's bloodline by calling Arranshahiks "a Haykazian dynasty".

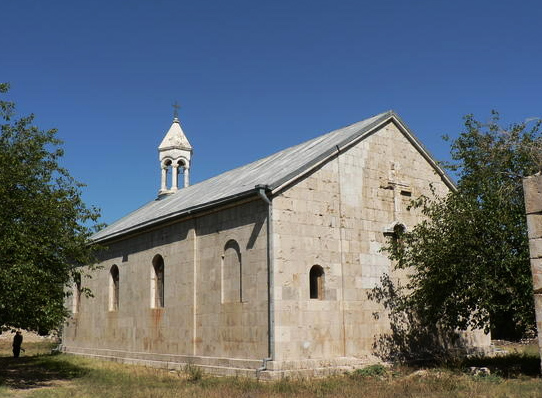
Amaras Monastery in Karabagh, where in the 5th century Mesrob Mashtots set up the first school to use his Armenian alphabet

In Kaghankatvatsi's History and in the historical text of the Armenian early medieval author Agathangelos, the Kingdom of Aghvank's feudal system, including its political terminology, was Armenian. As in Armenia, nobles of Aghvank are referred to by the terms nakharars (նախարար), azats (ազատ), hazarapets (հազարապետ), marzpets (մարզպետ), shinakans (շինական), etc.

Princely families, which were later mentioned in Kaghankatvatsi's History were included in the Table of Ranks called "Gahnamak" (direct translation: "List of Thrones," Arm. Գահնամակ) of the Kingdom of Armenia, which defined Armenia's aristocratic hierarchy. Princely families of Caucasian Albania were also included in the Table of Armies called "Zoranamak" (Arm. Զորանամակ) of the Kingdom of Armenia which determined military obligations of key aristocratic families before the Armenian King in times of war.

As in Armenia, the "Albanian" clergy used exclusively Armenian church terms for clerical hierarchy (katholikos/կաթողիկոս, vardapet/վարդապետ, sargavag/սարգավագ, etc.) Identifiably Armenian are also most if not all toponyms found in the History. Not only are the names of most towns, villages, mountains, and rivers uniquely Armenian morphologically, exactly the same toponyms were and are still found in other parts of historical Armenia. They include the root kert ("town") for towns (Arm.: կերտ, such Dastakert, Hnarakert – compare with Tigranakert or modern Stapanakert in Nagorno Karabakh), shen and kan (village) for villages (Arm. շեն, and կան, such as Karashen or Dyutakan), etc.

After the partition, the capital city of Caucasian Albania was moved from the territories on the eastern bank of the River Kura (referred to by Armenians "Aghvank Proper," Arm. Բուն Աղվանք) to Partav, located in the former Armenian province of Utik. This was followed by the transfer of the Seat of the Kingdom of Albania's religious leader (Katholicos) from territories north of Kura to Partav.

The Kingdom of Albania was converted to Christianity at the start of the 4th century by none other than the Armenian evangelizer St. Gregory the Enlightener (Arm. Սբ. Գրիգոր Լուսավորիչ), who baptized Armenia into the first Christian state by 301 AD. In about 330 AD, the grandson of St. Gregory, St. Grigoris, ecumenical head of the eastern provinces of Armenia, was designated bishop for the Kingdom of Aghvank. Mausoleum interning Grigoris’ remains, the Amaras Monastery stands as the oldest dated monument in Nagorno Karabakh. Amaras was started by St. Gregory and completed by St. Grigoris himself.

According to tradition, the Amaras Monastery housed the first Armenian school in historical Armenia, which was opened early in the 5th century by the inventor of the Armenian alphabet St. Mesrob Mashtots. St. Mesrob Mashtots was intensely active in preaching Gospel in Artsakh and Utik. Movses Kaghankatvatsi's History dedicates four separate chapters to St. Mashtots’ mission, referring to him as "enlightener" and "saint" (chapters 27, 28 and 29 of Book One, and chapter 3 of Book Two). Overall, St. Mesrob made three trips to the Kingdom of Albania where he toured not only the Armenian lands of Artsakh and Utik but also territories to the north of the River Kura.

Kaghankatvatsi's History describes Armenian influence on the Church of Aghvank, whose jurisdiction extended from Artsakh and Utik to regions to the north of the River Kura, in the territories of the "original", "pre-Armenian" Caucasian Albania. One of the consequences of this was that the Armenian language progressively supplanted Albanian as the language of church and state (and only if there was any single "Albanian" language in the first place which is doubtful because the population of Albania/Aghvank was described as consisting of as many 26 different tribes). In the same 7th century, Armenian poet Davtak Kertogh writes his Elegy on the Death of Grand Prince Juansher, where each passage begins with a letter of Armenian script in alphabetical order.

=== Christianization ===
The polytheistic religion of Albania was centered on the worship of three divinities, designated by Interpretatio Romana as Sol, Zeus, and Luna.

Christianity started to enter Caucasian Albania at an early date, according to Movses Kaghankatvatsi, as early as during the 1st century. The first Christian church in the region was built by St. Eliseus, a disciple of Thaddeus of Edessa, at a place called Gis. Shortly after Armenia adopted Christianity as its state religion (301 AD), the Caucasian Albanian king Urnayr went to the See of the Armenian Apostolic Church to receive baptism from St. Gregory the Illuminator, the first Patriarch of Armenia.

King Vachagan III helped to implant Christianity in Caucasian Albania, through a synod allowing the church legal rights in some domestic issues. In 498 AD (in other sources, 488 AD) in the settlement named Aluen (Aghuen) (present-day Agdam District of Azerbaijan), an Albanian church council convened to adopt laws further strengthening the position of Christianity in Albania.

Albanian churchmen took part in missionary efforts in the Caucasus and Pontic regions. In 682, the catholicos, Israel, led an unsuccessful delegation to convert Alp Iluetuer, the ruler of the North Caucasian Huns, to Christianity. The Albanian Church maintained a number of monasteries in the Holy Land. In the 7th century, Varaz-Grigor, ruler of Albania, and "his nation" were christened by Emperor Heraclius at Gardman.

After the overthrow of Nerses in 705, the Caucasian Albanian elite decided to reestablish the tradition of having their Catholicoi ordained through the Patriarch of Armenia, as it was the case before 590. This event is generally regarded as the abolition of the Church of Caucasian Albania, and the lowering of its denominational status to that of a Catholicate within the body of the Armenian Apostolic Church.

=== Islamic era ===
Sassanid Albania fell to the Islamic conquest of Persia in the mid-7th century and was incorporated into the Rashidun Caliphate. King Javanshir of Albania, the most prominent ruler of Mihranid dynasty, fought against the Arab invasion of caliph Uthman on the side of Sassanid Iran. Facing the threat of the Arab invasion on the south and the Khazar offensive on the north, Javanshir had to recognize the caliph's suzerainty. The Arabs then reunited the territory with Armenia under one governor.

By the 8th century, "Albania" had been reduced to a strictly geographical and titular ecclesiastical connotation, and was referred to as such by medieval Armenian historians; on its place sprang a number principalities, such as that of the Armenian principality and kingdom of Khachen, along with various Caucasian, Iranian and Arabic principalities: the principality of Shaddadids, the principality of Shirvan, the principality of Derbent. Most of the region was ruled by the Persian Sajid dynasty from 890 to 929. The region was at times part of the Abbasid province of Armenia based on numismatic and historical evidence.

Early Muslim ruling dynasties of the time included Rawadids, Sajids, Salarids, Shaddadids, Shirvanshahs, and the Sheki and Tiflis emirates. The principal cities of Arran in early medieval times were Barda (Partav) and Ganja. Barda reached prominence in the 10th century, and was used to house a mint. Barda was sacked by the Rus and Norse several times in the 10th century as a result of the Caspian expeditions of the Rus. Barda never revived after these raids and was replaced as capital by Baylaqan, which in turn was sacked by the Mongols in 1221. After this Ganja rose to prominence and became the central city of the region. The capital of the Shaddadid dynasty, Ganja was considered the "mother city of Arran" during their reign.

The territory of Arran became a part of the Seljuk empire, followed by the Ildegizid state. It was taken briefly by the Khwarizmid dynasty and then overran by Mongol Hulagu empire in the 13th century. Later, it became a part of Chobanid, Jalayirid, Timurid, and Safavid states.

== In Azerbaijani historiography ==
The history of Caucasian Albania has been a major topic of Azerbaijani revisionist theories, which came under criticism in Western and Russian academic and analytical circles, and were often characterized as "bizarre" and "futile".

In his article "The Albanian Myth", Russian historian and anthropologist Victor Schnirelmann states that Azerbaijani academics have been "renaming prominent medieval Armenian political leaders, historians and writers, who lived in Nagorno-Karabakh and Armenia into "Albanians"". Schnirelmann argues that these efforts were first launched in the 1950s and were directed towards "ripping the population of early medieval Nagorno Karabakh off from their Armenian heritage" and "cleansing Azerbaijan of Armenian history". In the 1970s, Azerbaijan made a transition from ignoring, discounting or concealing Armenian historical heritage in Soviet Azerbaijan to misattributing and mischaracterizing it as examples of Azerbaijani culture by arbitrarily declaring "Caucasian Albanians" as ancestors of modern Azerbaijanis. In this regard, Thomas de Waal, a scholar at the Carnegie Endowment for International Peace, writes about the political context of Azerbaijan's historical revisionism:

This rather bizarre argument has the strong political subtext that Nagorno Karabakh had in fact been Caucasian Albanian and that Armenians had no claim to it.

Schnirelmann states that a significant revisionist method used by Azerbaijani scholars was "re-publishing of ancient and medieval sources, where the term "Armenian state" was routinely and systematically removed and replaced with "Albanian state". American author George Bournoutian gives examples of how that was done by Ziya Bunyadov, vice-chairman of Azerbaijani Academy of Sciences, who earned the nickname of "Azerbaijan’s foremost Armenophobe".

According to de Waal:

Buniatov’s scholarly credentials were dubious. It later transpired that the two articles he published in 1960 and 1965 on Caucasian Albania were direct plagiarism. Under his own name, he had simply published, unattributed, translations of two articles, originally written in English by Western scholars C.F.J. Dowsett and Robert Hewsen.

Hewsen, a historian from Rowan College and the acknowledged authority in this field, wrote in his volume Armenia: A Historical Atlas, published by University of Chicago Press:

Scholars should be on guard when using Soviet and post-Soviet Azeri editions of Azeri, Persian, and even Russian and Western European sources printed in Baku. These have been edited to remove references to Armenians and have been distributed in large numbers in recent years. When utilizing such sources, the researchers should seek out pre-Soviet editions wherever possible.

— Robert Hewsen

According to de Waal, a disciple of Bunyadov, Farida Mammadova, has "taken the Albanian theory and used it to push Armenians out of the Caucasus altogether. She had relocated Caucasian Albania into what is now the Republic of Armenia. All those lands, churches, and monasteries in the Republic of Armenia—all had been Albanian. No sacred Armenian fact was left un-attacked". De Waal describes Mammadova as a sophisticated end of what "in Azerbaijan has become a very blunt instrument indeed". Both Ziya Bunyadov and Farida Mammadova are known for their anti-Armenian public pronouncements and pamphlets.

Historical revisionism in Azerbaijan supported a number of policies on the ground, including cultural vandalism directed against Armenian monuments in Soviet and post-Soviet Azerbaijan. Armenian memorial stone crosses known as "khachkars" on the territory of Azerbaijan were regularly misrepresented as "Caucasian Albanian" both before and after Azerbaijan's independence. Furthermore, mischaracterization of Armenian khachkars as supposedly non-Armenian monuments of Caucasian Albania was associated with acts of cultural vandalism against Armenian historical monuments in Nakhichevan. The Khachkar destruction in Nakhchivan refer to the systematic campaign by the government of Azerbaijan to completely demolish the Armenian cemetery in Julfa with thousands of Armenian khachkars near the town of Julfa (known as Jugha in Armenian), Nakhchivan. Claims by Armenians that Azerbaijan was undertaking a systematic campaign to destroy and remove the monuments first arose in late 1998 and those charges were renewed in 2002 and 2005. Adam T. Smith, an anthropologist and associate professor of anthropology at the University of Chicago, called the removal of the khachkars "a shameful episode in humanity's relation to its past, a deplorable act on the part of the government of Azerbaijan which requires both explanation and repair". Smith and other scholars, as well as several United States Senators, signed a letter to the UNESCO and other organizations condemning Azerbaijan's government. Azerbaijan instead contends that the monuments were not of Armenian, but of Caucasian Albanian, origin, which, per Thomas De Waal, did not protect "the graveyard from an act in the history wars".

Anti-Armenian cultural vandalism in Azerbaijan perpetrated with the use of revisionist theories on Caucasian Albania was also noted in northern Azerbaijan, where Norwegian archeologists were involved in the restoration of an Armenian-Georgian church in the village of Kish near the city of Shaki. Azerbaijanis erased Armenian inscriptions on the church's walls, which led to by an official complaint by Norwegian foreign ministry.

Furthermore, revisionist theories about Caucasian Albania have also been used by Azerbaijani statesmen in the ongoing Azerbaijani-Georgian dispute over the territorial status of David Gareja monastery complex, a Georgian spiritual and historical monument partially located on the territory of Azerbaijani Republic. David Gareja is a rock-hewn Georgian Orthodox monastery complex in the Kakheti region of Eastern Georgia, on the semi-desert slopes of Mount Gareja, some 60–70 km southeast of Georgia's capital Tbilisi. Giorgi Manjgaladze, Georgia's deputy foreign minister proposed that Georgia would be willing to exchange other territory for the remainder of David Gareja because of its historical and cultural significance to the Georgians. Baku disapproves of this land swap, and in April 2007, Azerbaijan's deputy foreign minister Khalaf Khalafov told a press conference in Baku that it was "out of the question" for Azerbaijan to "give up its claims to the borderlands" including David Gareja. Khalafov then stated that the monastery "was home to the Caucasian Albanians, who are believed to have been the earliest inhabitants of Azerbaijan". Georgian art historian Dimitri Tumanishvili dismissed this claim and stated that the complex "is covered in the work of Georgian masters". "There are Georgian inscriptions everywhere dating back to the sixth century," he said, "There are no traces of another culture there. After that, I don’t think you need any further proof."

== See also ==
- Arsacid dynasty of Caucasian Albania
- Arts of Caucasian Albania
- Artsakh
- Church of Caucasian Albania
- Shirvan
