= Elene Tsagareishvili =

- Born: 1 May 1930; Kutaisi (Soviet Union)
- Died: 13 May 2020 (aged 90)
- Alma mater: Tbilisi State University
- Occupation: Historian, armenologist, source critic
- Employer: Georgian National Center of Manuscripts

Elene Tsagareishvili (in Georgian: ელენე ცაგარეიშვილი), (1 July 1930, in Kutaisi - 13 May 2020), in Tbilisi), was a Georgian historian and Armenian studies scholar.

During her career, she notably served as the director of the Georgian National Center of Manuscripts.

== Biography ==
Tsagareishvili was born on 1 July 1930 in Kutaisi. After completing her university studies, she graduated from the Tbilisi State University, then part of the USSR, in 1954. In 1965, she defended her thesis titled 'History of Armenia by John of Draskhanakert'. In 1968, she focused her studies on 9th century Armenian history through Armenian sources. The researcher also explored the historical geography of Georgia. She later joined and eventually became the director of the Georgian National Center of Manuscripts.

She died on 13 May 2020 in Tbilisi. In 2020, following her death, the Center published an article commemorating her contributions to the study of history of the Caucasus.
