= Matenadaran MS 7117 =

15th-century manuscript

- Matenadaran, Armenia
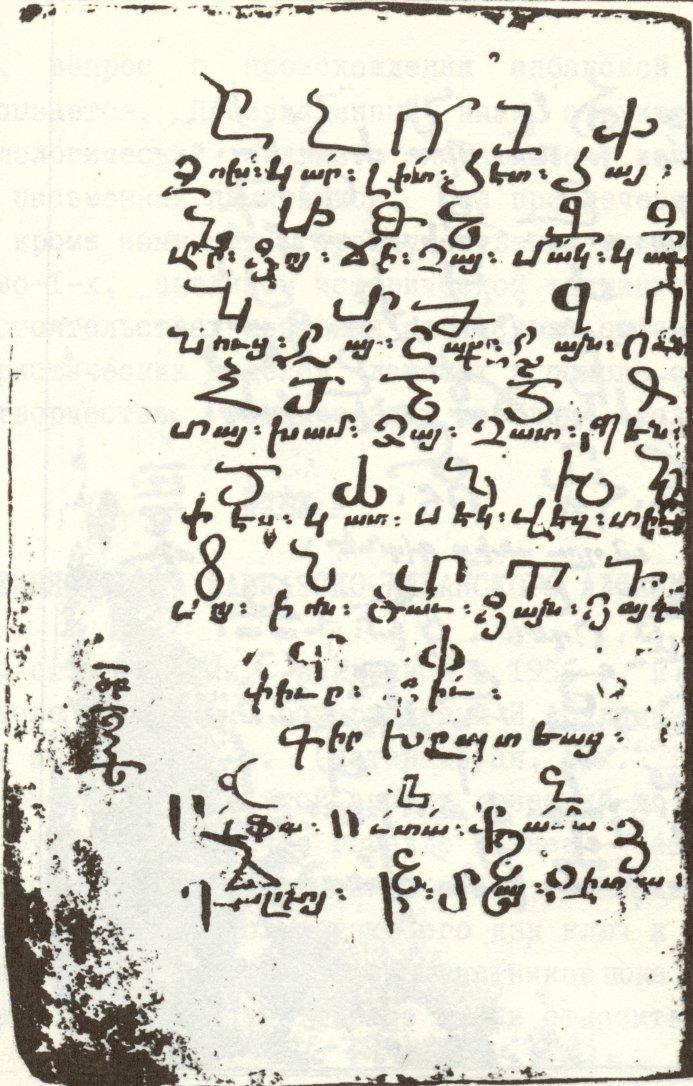
- Type: Pamphlet
- Date: 1442
- Place of origin: Van, modern day Turkey
- Author: Unknown
- Patron: Thomas of Metsoph
- Previously kept: Metsopavank, St. Astvatsatsin Monastery, Van
- Discovered: 28 September 1937 by Ilia Abuladze

The Matenadaran MS 7117 is a manuscript from Matenadaran which contains apologetic texts as well as codex of different alphabets such as Armenian, Greek, Latin, Syriac, Georgian, Coptic and Caucasian Albanian alphabet manual of the 15th century. It is also noted for including most ancient Kurdish language document transcribed in Armenian letters.

== Origin ==
It was written around 1442 in monastery of Metsopavank, northwest of the city of Arjesh (modern Erciş, Turkey). It was written after a model brought from Crimea by the Armenian catholicos Kirakos of Virap (1441–1443) at the request of Thomas of Metsoph.

== Discovery of Albanian script ==
The Albanian script inside the manuscript was discovered by Georgian researcher Ilia Abuladze on 28 September 1937 while he was working on 15th century manuscripts. Another Georgian linguist, Akaki Shanidze made further research and came to a conclusion that the script closely resembles the phonology of Udi language. Another copy of this list appeared in 1956 and details were published by H. Kurdian.
