= Caucasian Albanian language =

Extinct Northeast Caucasian language

Aghwan
- Old Udi; Gargarian; Caucasian Albanian
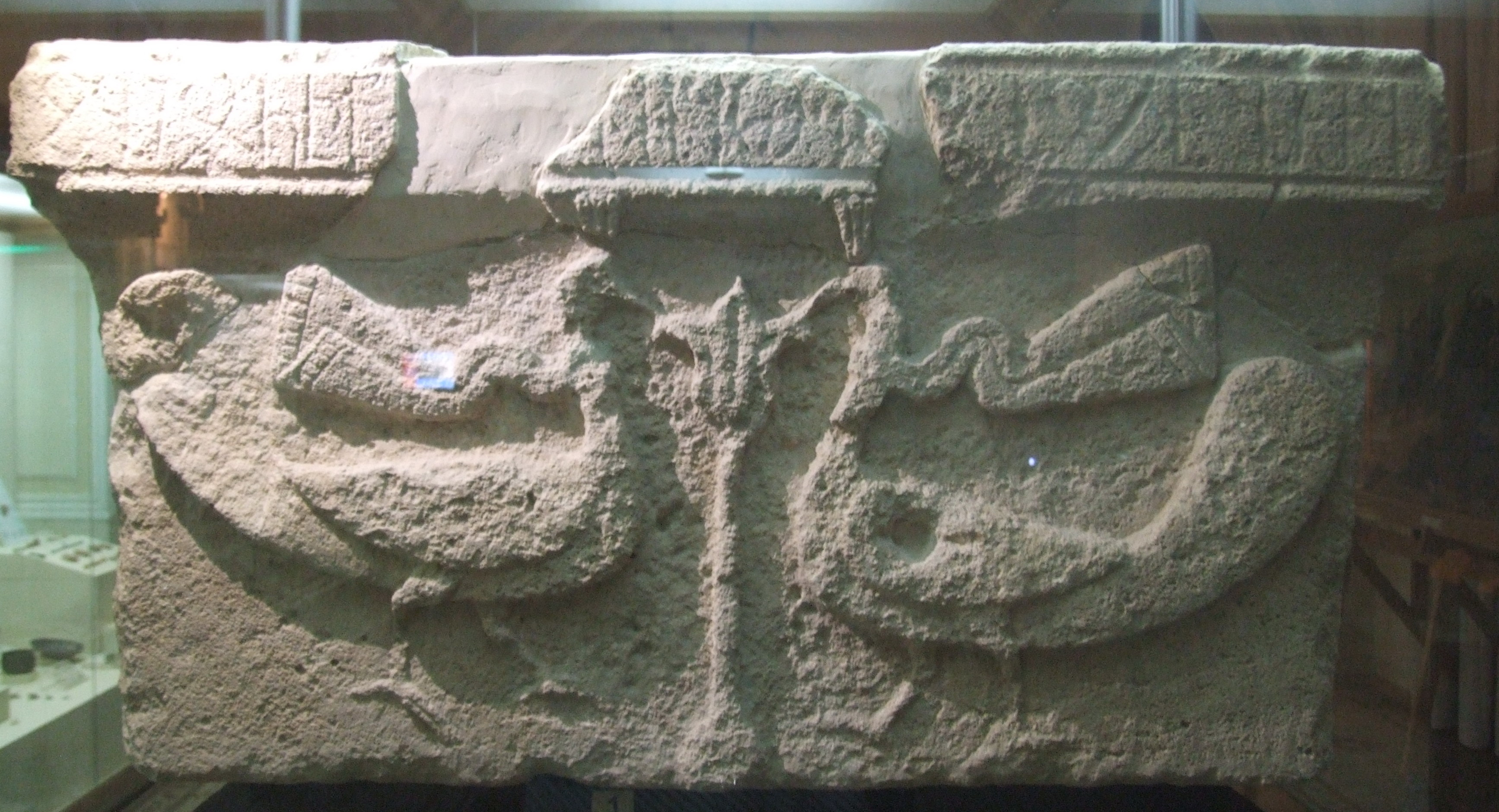
- A 7th-century column capital with Caucasian Albanian text
- Native to: Caucasian Albania
- Era: 6th–8th century AD. Developed into Udi
- Language family: Northeast Caucasian: Lezgic; Samur; Eastern Samur; Aghwan
- Writing system: Caucasian Albanian

Language codes
- ISO 639-3: xag
- Glottolog: aghw1237

Caucasian Albanian (also called Old Udi, Aluan or Aghwan) is an extinct member of the Northeast Caucasian languages. It was spoken in Caucasian Albania, which stretched from current day south Dagestan to Azerbaijan. Linguists believe it is an early linguistic predecessor to the endangered Northeast Caucasian Udi language. The distinct Caucasian Albanian alphabet used 52 letters.

Caucasian Albanian possibly corresponds to the "Gargarian" language identified by medieval Armenian historians. Despite its name, Caucasian Albanian bears no linguistic relationship whatsoever with the Albanian language spoken in Albania, which belongs to the Indo-European family.

== Discovery and decipherment ==
The existence of the Caucasian Albanian literature was known only indirectly before the late 20th century. Koryun's Life of Mashtots, written in the 5th century but only surviving in much later corrupted manuscripts, and Movses Kaghankatvatsi's History of the Caucasian Albanians, written in the 10th century, attribute the conversion of the Caucasian Albanians to Christianity to two missionaries, Enoch and Dana, and the creation of the Caucasian Albanian alphabet to the Armenian scholar Mesrop Mashtots. A certain Bishop Jeremiah then translated the Christian Bible into their language. As recently as 1977, Bruce Metzger could write that "nothing of [this] version has survived".

In 1996, Zaza Aleksidze of the Centre of Manuscripts in Tbilisi, Georgia, discovered a palimpsest at Saint Catherine's Monastery on Mount Sinai, Egypt, with an unknown script. He went on to identify the alphabet as Caucasian Albanian, and to identify the manuscript as an early Christian lectionary from about the 5th or 6th century. The lectionary may be the earliest extant lectionary in the Christian religion.

Then linguists Jost Gippert and Wolfgang Schulze got involved with the Caucasian Albanian alphabet. Specialized x-ray equipment was used, which made it possible to read the Caucasian Albanian palimpsest texts in their entirety. A list of Caucasian Albanian month names, which survived in a number of medieval manuscripts, gave one of the clues to the language. In 2017, two additional texts of Caucasian Albanian were discovered in Saint Catherine's Monastery. The original text on the palimpsests was erased anywhere between the 4th and 12th century.

== History ==
The Greek author Strabo (died 1st century AD) reports that the Caucasian Albanians spoke 26 different languages "for want of mutual intercourse with each other". It is supposed that most of the Caucasian Albanians were speakers of Lezgic languages, along with some Iranian and Kartvelian-speaking tribes. The Caucasian Albanian language probably developed from the language (or dialect) of one of the Lezgic-speaking tribes of the country which had risen to socio-economic and cultural prominence; Aleksan Hakobyan refers to it as a "pan-Albanian Koine". After the creation of the Caucasian Albanian alphabet in the early 5th century, the Caucasian Albanian language became the official language of the Caucasian Albanian Church. However, Caucasian Albanian does not appear to have found broad acceptance as the common language of the Albanian tribes, and from the beginning it shared its official status in the Church with Armenian. It lost its official status within the Church after the shift of the Albanian capital to Partaw, south of the Kura River. It survived as the language of church services in the Caucasian Albanian lands north of the Kura but ultimately fell into disuse as a written language, giving way to Armenian and Georgian.

The geographer Istakhri (writing c. 930) reports that al-rānīya was spoken in "the country of Bardha'a [the Arabic name for Partaw]". (Arran or al-Ran is the term used in Muslim sources for Caucasian Albania.) His continuators, Ibn Hawqal and al-Maqdisi, give slightly differing information: Ibn Hawqal writes that the "inhabitants of Bardha'a speak al-rānīya" while al-Maqdisi says "in Arran [they speak] al-rānīya". A number of scholars conclude from these reports that Caucasian Albanian was spoken in Bardha'a and the surrounding area in the 10th century. Hakobyan thinks that the speakers of al-rānīya/Caucasian Albanian were only located to the north of the Kura. According to Wolfgang Schulze, "it is a matter of dispute whether this language [al-rānīya] was 'Albanian' at all. Instead, one might assume that we have to deal with a local Northwest Iranian variety."

The Udi language, spoken by the Udi people in Armenia, Georgia, Azerbaijan and elsewhere, is closely related to Caucasian Albanian and may be its direct descendant.

== Texts ==
The deciphered text of the lectionary includes excerpts from the Hebrew Bible (Psalms and Isaiah) and from the New Testament (Acts of the Apostles the gospels of Matthew, Mark and Luke, and the epistles of Romans, 1 Corinthians, 2 Corinthians, Galatians, Ephesians, 1 Thessalonians, 2 Thessalonians, 1 Timothy, 2 Timothy, Hebrews, 2 Peter, 1 John and James). Text from the Gospel of John, separate from the lectionary, was also found. Its text proved much more difficult to recover and on some pages it can only be identified by the Eusebian canons at the bottom of the page. This was likely a complete gospel originally, and it is possible that the whole Bible had at some point been translated into Caucasian Albanian.

The Caucasian Albanian translation of the Bible relies predominantly on Old Armenian translations, but it deviates from the known Armenian text in several places, suggesting that the original Greek and possibly Georgian and Syriac translations were also used as source texts.

Apart from the Caucasian Albanian palimpsests kept at Mt. Sinai, the most famous samples of Caucasian Albanian inscriptions were found in 1949 during excavations in Mingachevir region, Azerbaijan. Among the known Caucasian Albanian words are zow (I), own (and) and avel-om (much, ordinal form).

== Phonology ==
=== Consonants ===
| | | Labial | Alveolar | | Postalveolar | Palatal | Velar | Guttural | Glottal |
| | | Labial | plain | palatalized | Postalveolar | Palatal | Velar | Guttural | Glottal |
|---|---|---|---|---|---|---|---|---|---|
| Nasal | | m | n | nʲ | | | | | |
| Plosive | voiceless | p | t | | | | k | q | |
| Plosive | voiced | b | d | dʲ | | | ɡ | | |
| Plosive | ejective | p’ | t’ | tʲ’ | | | k’ | q’ | |
| Affricate | voiceless | | ts | | tʃ | tɕ | | | |
| Affricate | voiced | | dz | dzʲ | dʒ | dʑ | | | |
| Affricate | ejective | | ts’ | | tʃ’ | tɕ’ | | | |
| Fricative | voiceless | f | s | | ʃ | ɕ | x | χ | h |
| Fricative | voiced | v | z | | ʒ | ʑ | ɣ | ʕ | |
| Approximant | | w | l | lʲ | | j | w | | |
| Trill | | | r | | | | | | |

=== Vowels ===
| | Front | | Back |
| | Unrounded | rounded | Back |
|---|---|---|---|
| Close | i | y | u |
| Mid | e | | o |
| Open | a | | ɒ |

== Grammar ==
=== Pronouns ===
Caucasian Albanian third-person pronouns did not exist – demonstratives were used instead.

| | 1sg | 1pl | 2sg | 2pl |
|---|---|---|---|---|
| Absolutive/Ergative | zow | žan | vown | vʕan |
| Genitive/Possessive | b-ez-i | b-eš-i | vē (~ ve-y) | b-ʕef-i |
| Dative I | za | ža | va | vʕa |
| Dative II | zax | žax | vax | vʕax |
| Dative III | zas | žas | vas | vʕas |
