= Caucasian Albanian (Unicode block) =

- Range: U+10530..U+1056F (64 code points)
- Plane: SMP
- Scripts: Caucasian Albanian
- Major alphabets: Caucasian Albanian
- Assigned: 53 code points
- Unused: 11 reserved code points

Unicode version history
- 7.0 (2014): 53 (+53)

Unicode documentation
- Code chart ∣ Web page

Caucasian Albanian is a Unicode block containing characters used by the Caucasian Albanian peoples of Azerbaijan and Dagestan for writing Northeast Caucasian languages.

Caucasian Albanian^{[1]}^{[2]} Official Unicode Consortium code chart (PDF)
	0	1	2	3	4	5	6	7	8	9	A	B	C	D	E	F
U+1053x	𐔰	𐔱	𐔲	𐔳	𐔴	𐔵	𐔶	𐔷	𐔸	𐔹	𐔺	𐔻	𐔼	𐔽	𐔾	𐔿
U+1054x	𐕀	𐕁	𐕂	𐕃	𐕄	𐕅	𐕆	𐕇	𐕈	𐕉	𐕊	𐕋	𐕌	𐕍	𐕎	𐕏
U+1055x	𐕐	𐕑	𐕒	𐕓	𐕔	𐕕	𐕖	𐕗	𐕘	𐕙	𐕚	𐕛	𐕜	𐕝	𐕞	𐕟
U+1056x	𐕠	𐕡	𐕢	𐕣												𐕯
Notes: 1. As of Unicode version 16.0; 2. Grey areas indicate non-assigned code points

Typefaces supporting this script include such as Arian AMU^{[hy]}, Noto Sans Caucasian Albanian and Unifont Upper. Recent versions of Windows also support Calibri and Microsoft Sans Serif.

== History ==
The following Unicode-related documents record the purpose and process of defining specific characters in the Caucasian Albanian block:

Version	Final code points (Note: Proposed code points and characters names may differ from final code points and names)	Count	L2 ID	WG2 ID	Document
7.0	U+10530..10563, 1056F	53	L2/11-143	N4039	Everson, Michael (2011-05-02), Preliminary proposal for encoding the Caucasian Albanian script in the SMP of the UCS
7.0	U+10530..10563, 1056F	53	L2/11-296R	N4131	Everson, Michael (2011-10-28), Proposal for encoding the Caucasian Albanian script in the SMP of the UCS
7.0	U+10530..10563, 1056F	53		N4243	Everson, Michael; Gippert, Jost (2012-02-14), Documentation for Two Characters FE2B and FE2C for Caucasian Albanian (N4131R)
7.0	U+10530..10563, 1056F	53	L2/12-112		Moore, Lisa (2012-05-17), "Consensus 131-C24", UTC #131 / L2 #228 Minutes
7.0	U+10530..10563, 1056F	53		N4253 (pdf, doc)	"M59.14", Unconfirmed minutes of WG 2 meeting 59, 2012-09-12
