= Farida Mammadova =

Azerbaijani historian (1936–2021)

- Born: 8 August 1936; Şirvan, Azerbaijan
- Died: 8 December 2021 (aged 85); Baku, Azerbaijan

Farida Jafar gizi Mammadova (Note: Also Mamedova, from the Russian rendering of her name (Фари́да Маме́дова)) (Azerbaijani: Fəridə Cəfər qızı Məmmədova; 8 August 1936 – 8 December 2021) was an Azerbaijani historian who specialized in the history of ancient Caucasian Albania. She was a lecturer at the Western Caspian University and Baku State University and worked for the Azerbaijan National Academy of Sciences.

== Career ==
Mammadova authored numerous research papers, articles, and books on Azerbaijani ancient and medieval history. She lectured at the Baku State University, Azerbaijan Pedagogical University, and was the head of the Department of Humanities in the Western University in Baku. Farida Mammadova worked at the Institute of History of the National Academy of Sciences of Azerbaijan. In her research, she is known to be a disciple of the late Azerbaijani historian and the former vice-president of the Azerbaijan National Academy of Sciences Ziya Bunyadov.

Mammadova's area of focus was the study of the development of Caucasian Albania, its ethnic composition, political and social life, the development of Christianity in Caucasian Albania, Church of Caucasian Albania, arts and literature. She defended her doctoral dissertation in 1971 under the supervision of historian Karen Yuzbashyan on different copies of the manuscript The History of the Country of Albania by Movses Kaghankatvatsi. The dissertation was published in book form in 1977.

== Reception ==
Mammadova's theories have been criticized by foreign authors for the misinterpretation of historical sources and revisionism. Among the critics of Mammadova's works is Russian historian Victor Schnirelmann, who dedicated a whole chapter in his book Wars of Memory to Mammadova's mistakes, misinterpretations and traced the influence of the anti-Armenian authors Vasily Velichko and Ziya Bunyadov on her theories.

According to Thomas de Waal, Mammadova's theories on the Albanians were formulated in such a way as "to separate the Armenians completely from the Caucasus." "She has placed Caucasian Albania on the territory of modern Armenia: all the territories, churches, and monasteries in Armenia have been designated as Albanian." He describes Mammadova's theories as "an improved version of what became a very rough tool in Azerbaijan".

During her interviews, Mammadova has made anti-Armenian statements, including:

And it is known that on whole planet exactly the Armenian people are distinguished by their absence of spiritual and other human values.

And further:

There are only two nations with an identity but no state. The Jews and the Armenians. The difference is that the Jews created a state in their historical homeland; the Armenians created one not in their historical homeland.

== Personal life ==
She died on 8 December 2021, at the age of 85.

== Selected publications ==
- «Istoriya alban» Moyseya Kalankatuyskogo kak istochnik po obshchestvennomu stroyu Kavkazskoy Albanii («История албан» Моисея Каланкатуйского как источник по общественному строю Кавказской Албании ("The History of the Albanians" of Moses of Kalankatu as a source on the social organization of Caucasian Albania)), Baku, 1977
- Politicheskaya istoriya i istoricheskaya geografiya Kavkazskoy Albanii (Политическая история и историческая география Кавказской Албании (Political history and historical geography of Caucasian Albania)), Baku, 1986
- "Le problème de l'ethnos albano-caucasien", Cahiers du Monde russe, Paris, 1990 (article)
- Christianity in Caucasian Albania
- Kavkazskaya Albaniya i albany (Кавказская Албания и албаны (Caucasian Albania and the Albanians)), Baku, 2005
