= Korneli Kekelidze =

Soviet and Georgian philologist

- კორნელი სამსონის ძე კეკელიძე
- Born: April 30, 1879
- Died: June 7, 1962
- Occupation: Philologist

Korneli Kekelidze (Georgian: კორნელი კეკელიძე) (April 30, 1879 – June 7, 1962) was a Soviet and Georgian philologist, scholar of Georgian literature, and one of the founding fathers of the Tbilisi State University where he chaired the Department of the History of Old Georgian Literature from 1918 until his death.

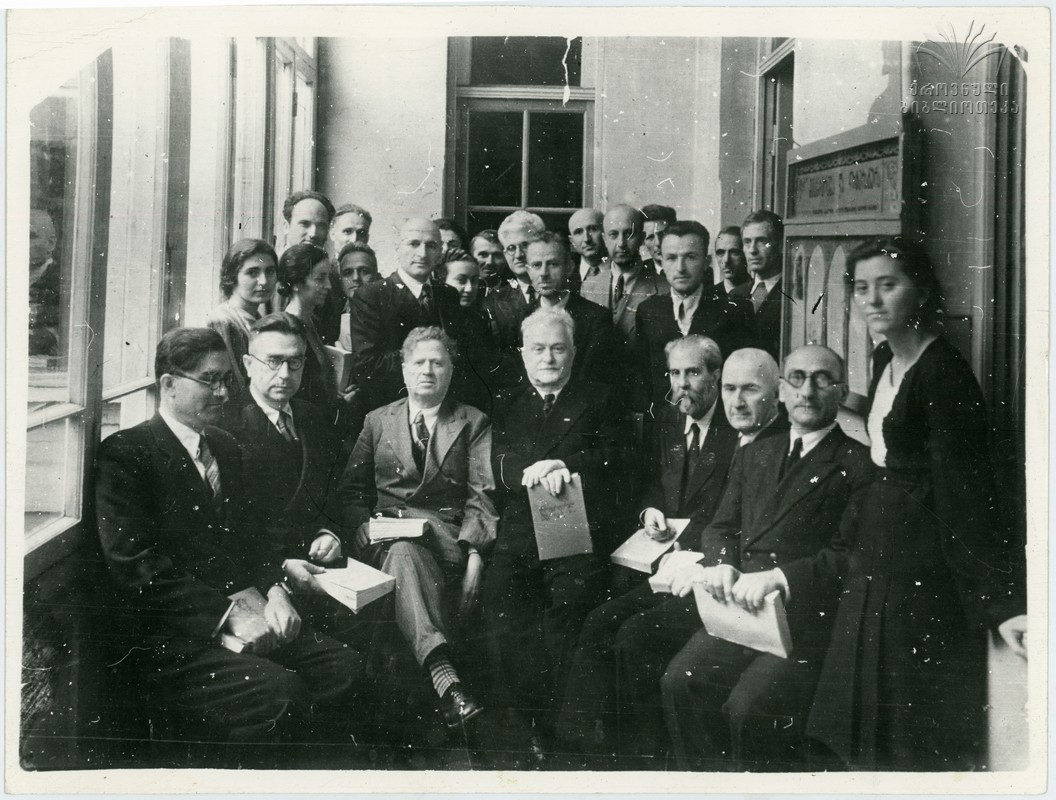

Kekelidze left a diverse literary and scholarly legacy that laid foundation for critical study of the Georgian literature. He discovered, studied and published several pieces of Old Georgian literature. His most influential work A History of Old Georgian Literature (ძველი ქართული ლიტერატურის ისტორია) went through four editions between 1923 and 1960. The magnitude of Kekelidze’s accomplishments was recognized by the naming of the Georgian Institute of Manuscripts in Tbilisi in his honor.

Kekelidze became a member of the Georgian National Academy of Sciences in 1941.
