= Gobustan, Baku =

Gobustan
- Municipality
- Azerbaijani: Qobustan
- Location within Azerbaijan
- Coordinates: 40°05′03″N 49°24′57″E
- Country: Azerbaijan
- City: Baku
- Raion: Garadagh

Population (2008)
  - Total: 14,470
- Time zone: UTC+4 (AZT)
  - Summer (DST): UTC+5 (AZT)

Qobustan (also, Gobustan, Duvannaya, Duvanny, Duvannyy, and Duyannaya) is a settlement and municipality in Baku, Azerbaijan. It has a population of 14,470.

Qobustan is best known for being the home to the famous rock petroglyphs and mud volcanoes.

The area has been settled since the 8th millennium BC. It is known for hosting thousands of rock engravings spread over 100 square km depicting hunting scenes, people, ships, constellations and animals. Its oldest petroglyphs date from the 38th millennium BC. In 2007, UNESCO included the 'Gobustan Rock Art Cultural Landscape' in the World Heritage List. The Gobustan State Reserve was featured during the Thirty-third Session of the Islamic Conference of Foreign Ministers.

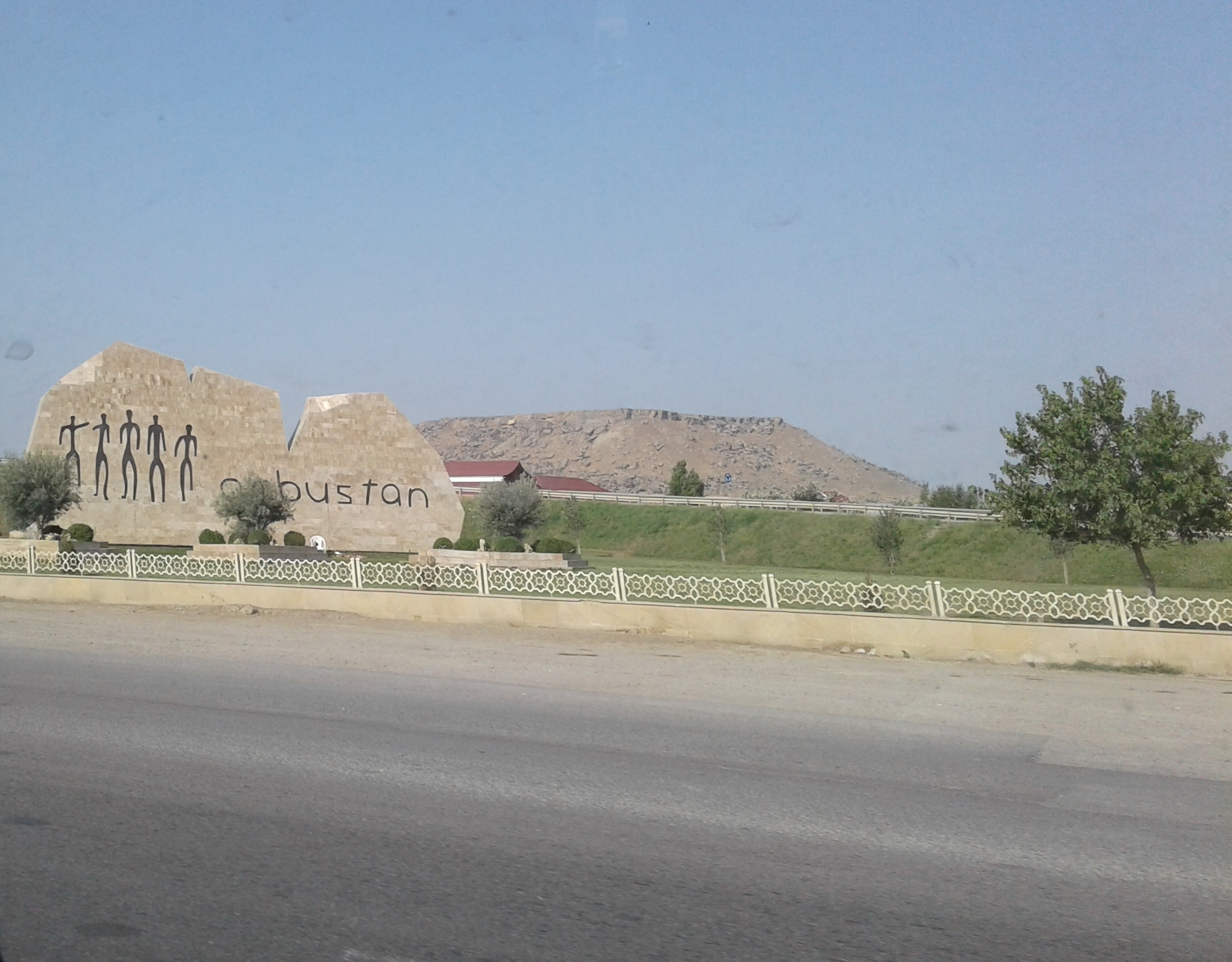
The entrance to the settlement.

There are inscriptions nearby left by a Roman Legionnaire around 75AD during the reign of Emperor Domitian which is the easternmost Roman inscription ever found. Gobustan is also famous for its mud volcanoes. Nearly 300 of the world's 700 mud volcanoes are located in this part of eastern Azerbaijan near the Caspian Sea.

== See also ==
- World Heritage Site
