= Zaza Aleksidze =

Georgian historian and linguist (1935–2023)

Doctor of Sciences Zaza Aleksidze
- ზაზა ალექსიძე
- Born: 18 October 1935; Telavi, Georgia SSR, Transcaucasian SFSR, Soviet Union
- Died: 24 January 2023 (aged 87); Tbilisi, Georgia
- Occupations: Historian; linguist; armenologist
- Known for: Decipherment of the Caucasian Albanian script

Academic background
- Education: Tbilisi State University

Academic work
- Institutions: Tbilisi State University; Georgian National Center of Manuscripts

Zaza Aleksidze (Georgian: ზაზა ალექსიძე, also transliterated as Zaza Alexidze; 18 October 1935 – 24 January 2023) was a Georgian historian and linguist who specialized in Armenian and Oriental studies. He is best known internationally for deciphering the Caucasian Albanian script.

== Biography ==
Zaza Aleksidze was born on 18 October 1935 in Telavi in then-Soviet Georgia, into the family of agricultural scientist Nikoloz Aleksidze and his wife, pianist Eugenia Aleksidze. He graduated from Tbilisi State University with a degree in history in 1958 and earned a doctorate in 1969 and a post-doctorate in 1984.

Aleksidze worked at the Georgian Institute of Manuscripts (now the Georgian National Center of Manuscripts) from 1958 to 1968 and the Institute of History, Archaeology and Ethnography from 1968 to 1979. Later, from 1979 to 2006, Aleksidze chaired the Department of Armenian Studies at the Tbilisi State University. He then served as director of the Institute of Manuscripts from 1989 to 2006 and as head of the Department of Codicology at the National Center of Manuscripts from 2006 until his death in 2023.

Aleksidze was also professor emeritus of the Tbilisi State University and academician at the Georgian National Academy of Sciences. He was decorated with the Order of Honor of Georgia in 2002 and several other academic awards.

Aleksidze died in Tbilisi on 24 January 2023, at age 87.

== Works ==
Aleksidze's research interests were focused on the social and cultural history of the medieval Caucasus. He authored several works on the medieval Georgian and Armenian inscriptions and manuscripts as well as commentaries on the medieval Armenian literary sources, such as the Book of Letters and Ukhtanes, which he also translated into Georgian.

Aleksidze's best known achievement is his contribution to the decipherment of the Caucasian Albanian script — a long-defunct alphabet of the Caucasian Albanians — which he owed to his 2003 discovery of a Georgian-Albanian palimpsest at the Saint Catherine's Monastery on Mount Sinai.
