= Ilia Abuladze =

Georgian historian and philologist (1901–1968)

- Born: November 24, 1901; Zeda Sakara, Imereti, Kutais Governorate
- Died: October 9, 1968 (aged 66); Tbilisi, Georgia SSR
- Resting place: Didube Pantheon
- Known for: Rediscovery of Caucasian Albanian script

Ilia Vladimiri dze Abuladze (Georgian: ილია ვლადიმერის ძე აბულაძე; November 24, 1901 – October 9, 1968) was a distinguished Georgian historian, philologist and public figure, a Corresponding Member of the Georgian Academy of Sciences (GAS) (1950), Meritorious Science Worker of Georgia (1961), Doctor of Philological Sciences (1938), and professor (1947).

Abuladze was born in a small village in Imereti (Western Georgia). In 1927 he graduated from the Tbilisi State University (TSU) and engaged in academic work in 1932. He was a scholar specializing in the history of old Georgian literature and the Armeno-Georgian literary and cultural relations. He is also renowned for having rediscovered the lost alphabet of Caucasian Albanians.

In 1937 Abuladze discovered a 13th-century Armenian “collective codex of educational character” in the Matenadaran (ms. 7117) which contains among the accounts of several other scripts (Armenian, Hebrew, Greek, Arabic, Latin, Georgian, and Coptic), a list of “Albanian” letters (ałowanicʿ girn). The list comprises 52 characters arranged in alphabetical order.

In 1950 Abuladze was elected a Corresponding Member of the Georgian Academy of Sciences. In 1958 he organized the Institute of Manuscripts of the GAS (now the Georgian National Center of Manuscripts) and became its lifelong director. From 1938 to 1968 Abuladze was a professor of the Tbilisi State University.

Abuladze published critical editions of all major Georgian hagiographical works in the monumental series of Works of Old Georgian Hagiographical Literature (ძველი ქართული აგიოგრაფიული ლიტერატურის ძეგლები). Having taken a special interest in Armenian sources, he edited the medieval Armenian adaptation of the Georgian Chronicles. He also discovered and studied the ancient Old Udi script (1937) and compiled Dictionary of the Old Georgian Language (ძველი ქართული ენის ლექსიკონი; appeared posthumously in 1973).

== See also ==
- List of Georgians
