= Georgian National Centre of Manuscripts =

- საქართველოს ხელნაწერთა ეროვნული ცენტრი (თბილისი)
- Established: 30 June 1958
- Location: 1/3 Merab Aleksidze street, Tbilisi, Georgia
- Coordinates: 41°43′03″N 44°47′00″E
- Type: Archive, art museum
- Director: Zaza Abashidze
- Website: manuscript.ge

The Georgian National Centre of Manuscripts (Georgian: საქართველოს ხელნაწერთა ეროვნული ცენტრი; formerly the Institute of Manuscripts), located in Tbilisi, is a repository of ancient manuscripts, of historical documents and of the private archives of eminent public figures. The centre was established on 30 June 1958 on the basis of the collection in the Department of Manuscripts at the Georgian National Museum. The founder and the first director of the Institute was Professor Ilia Abuladze, a Corresponding Member of the Georgian Academy of Sciences. The collection of the National Centre of Manuscripts comprises manuscripts, historical documents, early printed books, rare publications and heirlooms. The Centre carries out various projects related to scientific research, exhibitions and restoration. Specialists working at and with the Centre engage in the description, systematisation, study and publication of the material housed at the Centre, as well as in the production of data bases dealing with this material. The Centre also has a rich academic library and includes rooms dedicated to the memory of Korneli Kekelidze, Ivane Javakhishvili, Ilia Abuladze, Niko Berdzenishvili, Elene Metreveli and Shalva Amiranashvili.

== History ==
The National Centre of Manuscripts was founded in 1958 under the name "The Institute of Manuscripts of the Georgian Academy of Sciences". It was created on the basis of the collection in the Department of Manuscripts at the Georgian National Museum and on the initiative of Ilia Abuladze, who became the first director of the Institute. In 1962, the name of the Institute was supplemented with "Kekelidze" to honour the Georgian philologist and literary historian Korneli Kekelidze. From 1968 until 1989, the director of the Institute was Elene Metreveli, Academician of the Georgian Academy of Sciences. During the period from 1989 to 2006, the director of the Institute was Zaza Aleksidze, a Corresponding Member of the Georgian Academy of Sciences.

In 2006, the "Korneli Kekelidze Institute of Manuscripts of the Georgian Academy of Sciences" was abolished and replaced through the establishment of a legal entity under public law, the "Korneli Kekelidze Institute of Manuscripts". On 23 May 2007, on the initiative of the staff at the Institute, its name was changed to "The National Centre of Manuscripts". This initiative was supported by the Ministry of Education and Science and was approved by the government.

== Structure ==
Organisational and administrative activities of the Centre are managed by the director, whereas scientific and development activities are managed and implemented by the Scientific Council. In addition, the Centre contains other structural units: departments and laboratories. Currently there are eight departments (Codicology, Source Studies and Diplomatics, Archival Studies, Fund Management, Exhibitions, Education, the Library, Art History) and two laboratories (Restoration and Conservation, Digitalisation).

=== Director ===
The Director of the National Centre of Manuscripts manages organizational and administrative activities of the Centre. In relations with third parties, the director is the official representative of the Centre and is responsible for ensuring that the Centre's activities are the legitimate, reasonable and effective.

According to the Charter of the National Centre of Manuscripts, the Scientific Council elects a director for a period of four years. Mandatory requirements for this post are a higher degree and work experience of not less than five years.

The director of the Centre has a deputy who, in the event of the absence of the former, serves as Acting Director. At present, the director of the Centre is Zaza Abashidze.

=== Scientific Council ===
The Scientific Council of the National Centre of Manuscripts is, together with the Director, the executive body of the Centre. The Scientific Council discusses and takes decisions by voting on matters regarding the management and development of the Centre.

The members of the Council are elected for a five-year period at the general meeting of the scientific members of the National Centre of Manuscripts. The number of Council members depends on the number of the Centre's structural units (departments and laboratories). Each structural unit is represented on the Council by one or two academic colleagues (two if the number of academics in the structural unit is greater than ten).

The Council is led by a chairman, elected for five years by the Council itself. At present the chairman of the Scientific Council is Shalva Gloveli.

=== Structural units ===
==== Department of Codicology ====
The Department of Codicology performs work in two main directions:

- Editions of the original and translated old Georgian literature supplemented with philological-textological and historical studies and various types of dictionaries and indices;
- Description of the Georgian handwritten books and manuscripts in other languages preserved in repositories of Georgia and foreign countries – Jerusalem, Mount Sinai, Mount Athos, Paris, Saint-Petersburg, etc.

==== Department of Source Studies and Diplomatics ====
Department of Source Studies and Diplomatics was founded at the beginning of the establishment of the Centre. The specifics of the material itself defined the scientific-research activity profile of the department. The department activities mainly cover the following:

- Exact description and listing of the material, search engine optimisation – preparation of different kind of catalogues.
- Expansion of the source studies’ base in Georgian history – publication of historic sources.

In the scientific-research activity of the department great attention was given to the description – research and publication oriental sources of Georgian history – Armenian, Arabic, Persian, Turkish sources.

==== Department of Archival Studies ====
This Department was established in 2007 on the basis of the private archives of writers and public figures preserved at the National Centre of Manuscripts. Department works in the following directions:

- Processing of the private archives, including preparation of the descriptions and edition for publishing;
- Reprocessing of the archives;
- Creation of generic electronic catalogue with existing photo-collections;
- Scientific publications of the archival documents;
- Attraction of new archives.

==== Department of Fund Management ====
Funds

The Department Fund Management manages the funds of manuscript books and historical documents as well as the private archives. Other funds created in the Department’s structure are also within its competence. The library books, the funds of memorial cabinets and articles as well as the cartography funds are managed and controlled by the Department of Library, but the issues of creation, integration or division are agreed with the Department of Fund Management.

==== Department of Exhibition ====
The aim of the Department of Exhibition is to give mass appeal to the cultural heritage preserved in the Centre by the means of the various exhibition projects. The Exhibition Department arranges permanent and mobile exhibitions both inside and outside Georgia. The Exhibition Department supports development of the exhibition system of the National Centre of Manuscripts and its compliance with the international standards of exhibitions.

==== Department of Education ====
Department of Education by means of the educational and exhibition projects, various programs and services implements integration of the cultural and intellectual heritage preserved at the Centre in the life of society. Interaction and direct contact with this heritage Department supports self-realisation and development of the members and groups of society.

==== Department of Library ====
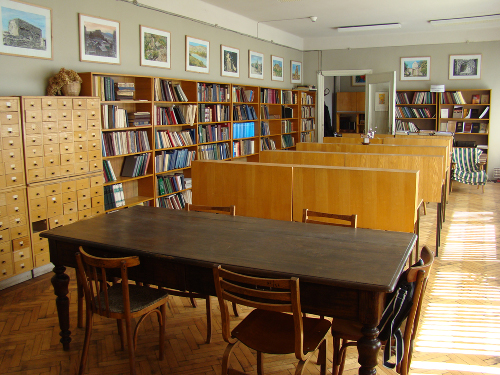
Reading Hall of the National Centre of Manuscripts

There are 10,935 Georgian, 11,654 Russian and 6496 other foreign-language books in the field of humanities kept at the main depositories of the Library of the National Centre of Manuscripts. The library also counts 3096 Georgian, 7285 Russian and about 4000 other foreign journals.

The main part of the library books and journals are kept at depositories, encyclopaedias, dictionaries and referral literature in the reading hall of the library.

The library has an integrated catalogue that, in addition to main depository catalogues, lists the catalogues of the books and journals kept at 6 memorial halls of the National Centre of Manuscripts.

==== Department of Art History ====
Department of Art History studies art of the Georgian books, works on creation and preparation of the corpus of miniatures which are included in the manuscripts for publishing. Illumination of manuscripts is studied considering chronological and thematic aspects in order to define artistic styles typical to the different scriptoria, epoch or subject matter. Special attention is devoted to the matters related to the copyists, artists and book-binders.

==== Laboratory of Conservation and Restoration ====
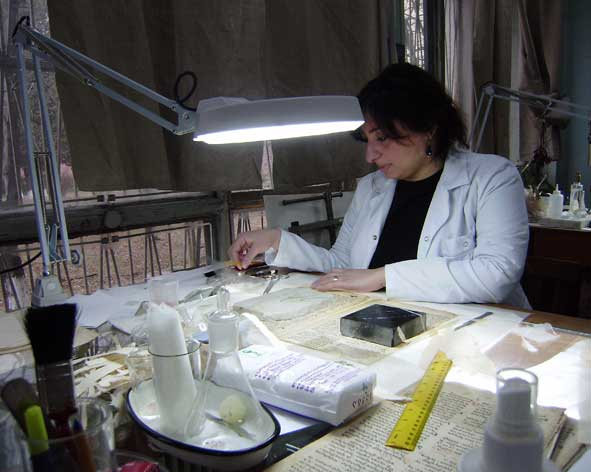
Book restoration process at the National Centre of Manuscripts

The Laboratory of Conservation and Restoration was established at the National Centre of Manuscripts in 2006. This Laboratory replaced the former Department of the Hygiene and Restoration. In the Laboratory of Conservation and Restoration the works are performed in several directions:

- Conservation and restoration of manuscripts on parchment and paper, early printed books, historical documents, archive materials as well as the books of the Centre's library and other materials preserved in the private collections;
- Conservation of the old and damaged pages;
- Separation of the petrified and stuck pages;
- Straightening and restoration of the deformed leaves;
- Filling the missing parts/passages;
- Binding of the loose manuscripts, restoration and conservation of the original stamped leather book-covers;
- Disinfection and cleaning of the preserved or newly acquired materials.

==== Laboratory of Digitalisation ====
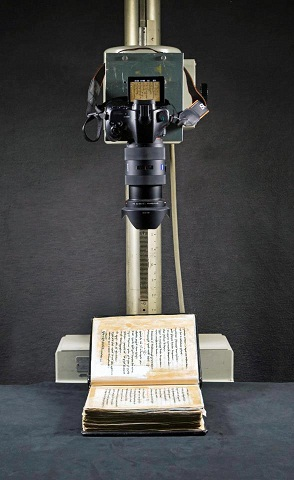
The process of digitalisation at the National Centre of Manuscripts

At the centre of the National Centre of Manuscripts functions the Laboratory of Digitalisation, where the materials kept at the Centre are scanned, sorted and encoded in digital format. Digitalisation of the manuscripts, documents, miniatures and photo materials the Centre supports their fixation and presentation to the scientific circles. Digitalisation is also a good tool for the preservation of the existing material – in the future materials which might be lost in the course of time can be restored on the basis of the digital copy.

== Collection ==
Moqvi Gospels from the collection of the National Centre of Manuscripts

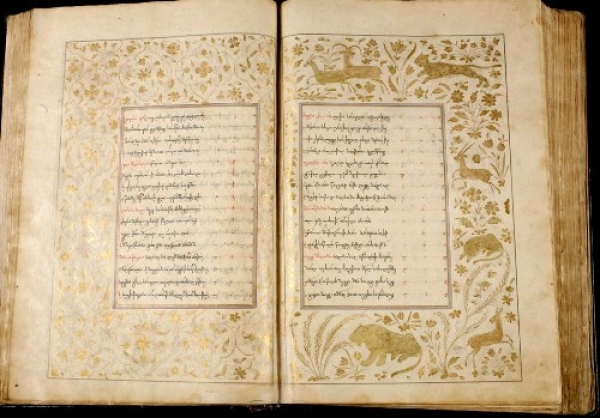
The manuscript of "Vepkhistkaosani" (The Man in the Panther’s Skin) from the National Centre of Manuscripts

The collection of the National Centre of Manuscripts comprises handwritten books, historical documents and archival funds. The collection of the manuscripts and historical documents are divided into groups (sub-funds) according to language, in the archival fund are kept private archives of the Georgian and foreign public figures, also archives of the various organisations.

=== Manuscripts ===
Collection of the manuscripts is divided into groups of Georgian, Oriental, Greek, Russian and manuscripts in other languages. Out of these groups collection of the Georgian manuscripts is the biggest. It comprises thousands of manuscripts, dated from 5th to 19th centuries. Among them are also palimpsests.

Collection of the Georgian manuscripts is divided into four sub-collections – A, H, Q and S. This collection contains both church and secular literary works. The preserved writings - "Martyrdom of Saint Shushanik", "Martyrdom of Evstati Mtskheteli", "Martyrdom of Abo Tbileli" form the cornerstone of the medieval Georgian church literature. Except of this collection comprises the notable works of Byzantine church literature translated into Georgian by Eqvtime Mtatsmindeli, Giorgi Mtatsmindeli, Eprem Mtsire, Arsen Ikaltoeli and other remarkable Georgian figures. From the secular literature are noteworthy handwritten copies of "Vepkhistkaosani" ("Man in the Panther Skin"), also other manuscripts containing astrological, geographic, medical, mathematic or military writings.

The Oriental collection mostly consists of Arabic, Persian and Turkish manuscripts. Collection preserves also around 300 Armenian, Syrian, Hebrew and one single Coptic manuscript.

The collection of the Greek manuscripts contains 51 handwritten copies in Old and Modern Greek dated to the period from 9th to 18th centuries. Manuscripts are written both on paper and parchment. According to content these are mostly church writings, among them theological writings, psalms, chants, other, also medical writings.

The collection of Russian manuscripts comprises more than 500 manuscripts. Most of them are of the late period, from 16th to 19th century. Here are kept Russian translations of the correspondence of the Georgian kings, nobles and of their family members, autographs of Lev Tolstoi and Pyotr Tchaikovsky, church writings, etc.

Besides these collections, there is also a collection of the foreign manuscripts which is mixed and contains the handwritten books copied from the 15th to the 20th century in different European languages – German, Italian, Polish, French manuscripts.

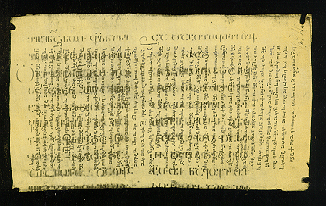
The Georgian palimpsest of the 5th-6th centuries from the collection of the Georgian manuscripts

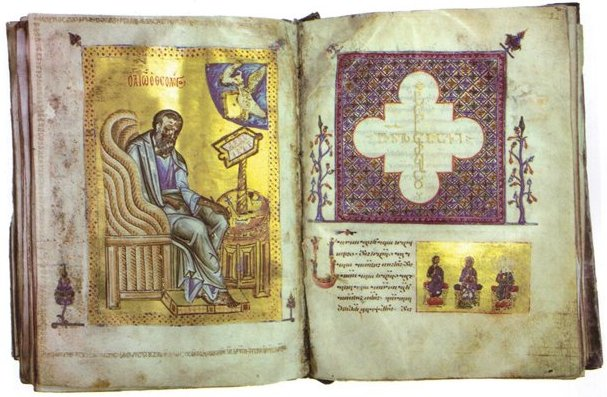
Gelati Gospels, Fund of the Georgian Manuscripts

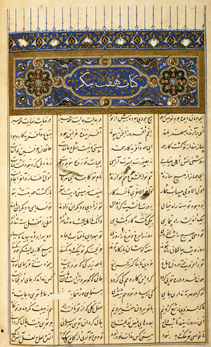
Persian manuscript, Fund of the Oriental Manuscripts

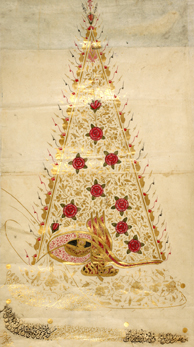
Turkish manuscript, Fund of the Oriental Manuscripts

=== Historical documents ===
Collection of the historical documents of the National Centre of Manuscripts comprises Georgian, Armenian, Arabic, Ottoman and Persian documents. Overall number of these documents exceeds 30 000 and they are dated to 10th-19th centuries. Collection of the Georgian handwritten documents contains both secular and church documents.

Arabic documents are of Dagestani origin and they represent life of the local Caucasian nations in 18th–19th centuries. One of the documents tells about the movement of Imam Shamil. The collection contains some other documents about relations of Georgia and Dagestan.

The collection also includes around 200 Armenian documents, dated to the 18th-19th centuries. These are various records, books of purchases and debts, official correspondence of the Armenian ecclesiastical figures, etc.

The noteworthy part of the collection of the Oriental manuscripts kept at the National Centre of Manuscripts are Persian and Turkish (Ottoman) documents, among them Shahs’ pirmans (orders), records, letters, purchase documents, etc. These documents illustrate the political, social and economic life of Georgia and other countries in Caucasus; they also represent the confrontation of Russia and Persia in the Caucasus region. These documents are also important for their ornamentation – the Persian handwritten documents are decorated in accordance with the traditions of the Persian illuminated manuscripts.

=== Private archival funds ===
The archival funds of the National Centre of Manuscripts are brought together archives of the Georgian and foreign scientists, writers, poets, painters, political, public and military figures, emigrant and church personalities, also archives of the Georgian Historical-Ethnographic Society and chancellery of the Synod. In whole 179 private archives are kept at the depositories of the National Centre of Manuscripts, out of them 111 funds have been processed and the remaining 68 are being processed.

Of the material preserved in the archival funds special mention should be made of the papyrus collection that belonged to the Georgian papyrologist Grigol Tsereteli, containing 150 papyri dating from the 2nd century B.C. – 15th century A.D.

Of no less interest is the material preserved in the other archival funds: original foreign-language documents connected with the life and activities of the Georgian and foreign public figures of the 19th-20th centuries in Georgian, Latin, French, English, Italian, Russian, Azeri, Armenian and other foreign languages; the richest epistolary legacy; numerous folkloristic records; unique photographs, invaluable material reflective of the new and most recent history of the South Caucasus in the field of politics, economy, church life, journalism, theatre, music and so on.
