= Jost Gippert =

German linguist (born 1956)

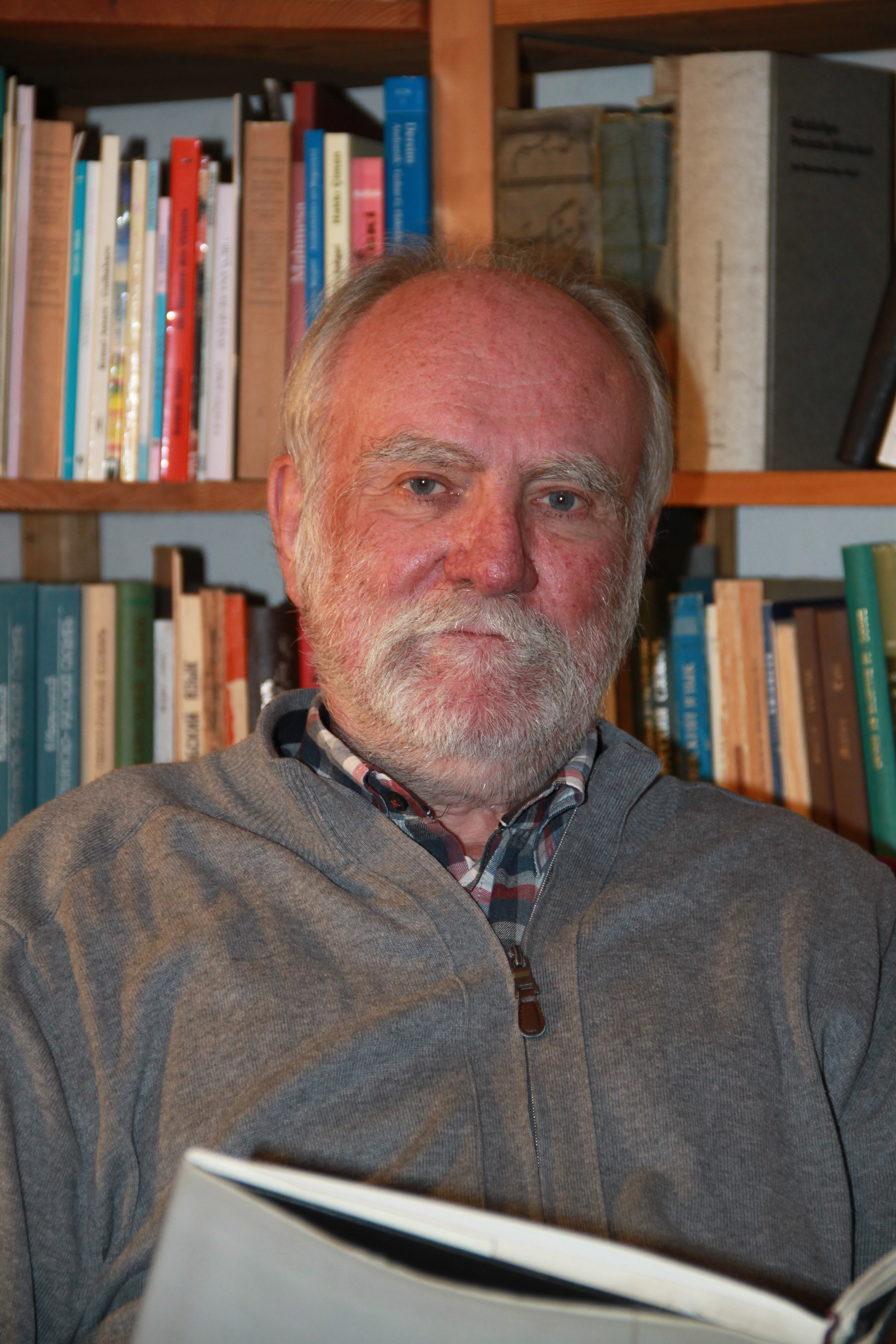
- Born: March 12, 1956; Germany
- Citizenship: Germany
- Scientific career
- Fields: Linguistics

Jost Gippert (German pronunciation: [ˈjoːst ˈgɪpʰɐt]; born 12 March 1956 in Winz-Niederwenigern, later merged to Hattingen) is a German linguist, Caucasiologist, author and Senior Professor at the Centre for the Study of Manuscript Cultures (Zentrum für Handschriftenkulturen) at the University of Hamburg.

== Professional history ==
Honorary Doctorate Conferment Ceremony at the Ivane Javakhishvili Tbilisi State University (from left to right: Bernard Outtier, Jost Gippert, Winfried Boeder and Darejan Tvaltvadze), 2009

In 1972, Gippert graduated from the Leibniz-Gymnasium in Essen, Germany. Having studied Comparative Linguistics, Indology, Japanese studies, and Chinese studies from 1972 to 1977 at the University of Marburg and the Free University of Berlin, he was awarded his Ph.D. in 1977 on the basis of his work on the syntax of infinitival formations in Indo-European languages. From 1977 to 1990, he worked as a research fellow and held lectures at the universities of Berlin, Vienna and Salzburg. While being research assistant for Oriental Computational Linguistics in 1991, he habilitated at the University of Bamberg with his inaugural dissertation on the study of Iranian loanwords in Armenian and Georgian.

Since 1994, Gippert has been teaching Comparative Linguistics at the Goethe University of Frankfurt. He has been a member of the Gelati Science Academy (Georgia) since 1996, and of the department of “Languages” at the Berlin-Brandenburg Academy of Sciences and Humanities since 2007.

In 1997, he was appointed the Honorary Professor of the Sulkhan Saba Orbeliani University in Tbilisi, Georgia, and, in 2009, he became Honorary Doctor at the Ivane Javakhishvili University also in Tbilisi, and was appointed Honorary Doctor at the Shota Rustaveli University in Batumi, Georgia, in 2013.

Since Gippert became a Professor of Comparative Linguistics, much of his research has focused on Indo-European languages, their history and etymology, as well as the general linguistic typology and especially the study of the languages of the Caucasus. Thanks to his dedication to the languages of the Caucasus, many international research projects have been undertaken in this area under his supervision. His research focuses on historical linguistics, linguistic typology, electronic text corpora, multimedia language documentation and electronic manuscript analysis.

Between 1999 and 2019, funded by the Volkswagen Foundation, he worked on the study of palimpsest manuscripts at Saint Catherine's Monastery in Sinai, the Austrian National Library, the National Library of Greece, and the Iviron Monastery on Mount Athos, focusing on Georgian, Caucasian-Albanian, Armenian, Slavic, Gothic, Latin and Greek palimpsests. He was the main author and coordinator of the scientific team that published the catalogue of Georgian manuscripts of the Monastery of Iviron. In 2023, this publication was awarded the Saintour Prize by the French Academy of Inscriptions and Belles-Lettres. Since 2022, he has been working at the Centre for the Study of Manuscript Cultures (Zentrum für Handschriftenkulturen) at the University of Hamburg as a Senior Professor, continuing to teach and direct research projects in an auxiliary capacity following his retirement from the University of Frankfurt. He is also the Head of the ERC funded project “The Development of Literacy in the Caucasian Territories (DeLiCaTe)“ hosted by the aforementioned Centre. The project aims to show the development of specific alphabetic scripts in the context of Christianisation in the early 5th century CE meant the beginning of literacy for three distinct ethnic groups in the Caucasus: Georgians, Armenians and the so-called “Caucasian Albanians“. He speaks twenty languages and reads more than fifty.

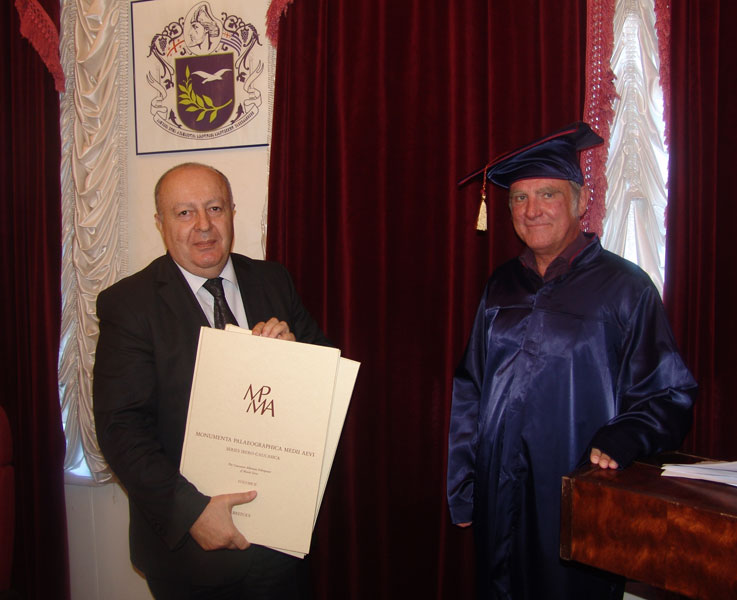
Honorary Doctorate Conferment Ceremony at the Shota Rustaveli State University Jost Gippert (on the right), 2013. The gentleman on the left is holding the two volumes edited by Gippert and three others on the Caucasian Albanian palimpsests of Sinai Monastery.

== Digital humanities ==
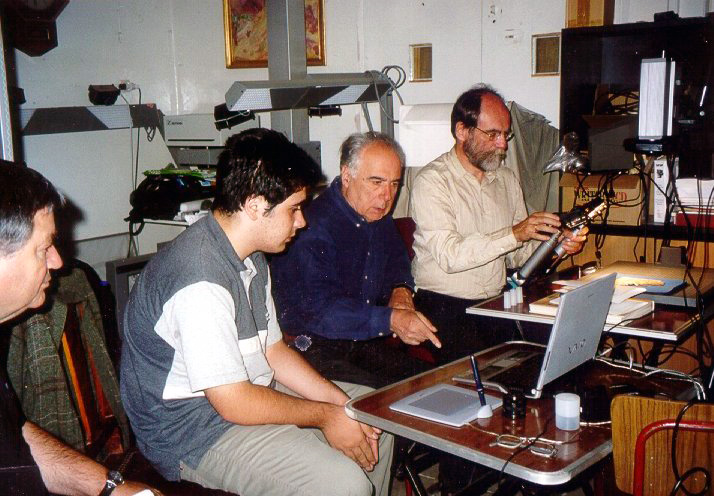
Palimpsest research on Mount Sinai

=== TITUS, ARMAZI, GNC, LOEWE and DeLiCaTe ===
Gippert is the founder and leader of the TITUS project (Thesaurus of Indo-European Texts and Languages). Its goal, since its foundation in 1987, has been the full digital accessibility of textually recorded material of various Indo-European and adjacent languages. In 1999, he started the ARMAZI project (Caucasian Languages and Cultures: Electronic Documentation), which aimed at a comprehensive collection of Caucasian language material. This project yielded the Georgian National Corpus (GNC). Since 2010, Gippert has been the head of the center “Digital Humanities in the State of Hesse: Integrated Processing and Analysis of Text-based Corpora” within the unit of the “Federal Offensive for the Development of Scientific and Economic Excellence” (LOEWE (project). This center is a collaboration between the Goethe University of Frankfurt and the Technische Universität Darmstadt with additional support from the Goethe Museum, Frankfurt.

=== Electronic manuscript analysis ===
Jost Gippert and Bernard Outtier at Iviron Monastery, Mount Athos, photographing Georgian manuscripts in 2017

In the 1990s, Gippert turned his attention to Oriental manuscripts, working on projects with the goal of making them digitally accessible, e.g., the Tocharian manuscripts of the Berlin Turfan Collection. Furthermore, he edited works including the Caucasian-Albanian palimpsest manuscripts found on Mount Sinai. In 2009, he was a visiting scholar in the research group “Manuscript Cultures” at the University of Hamburg. In summer 2013, he visited the University of Hamburg again, as a Petra Kappert Fellow, participating in the compilation of the “Encyclopedia of Manuscript Cultures” and of the handbook “Comparative Oriental Manuscript Studies”.

Since 2022 within the project "The Development of Literacy in the Caucasian Territories (DeLiCaTe)" Jost Gippert is leading the working process for the creation of the electronic manuscript analysis models and devices for the Georgian, Armenian and Caucasian Albanian manuscripts.

== Activities ==
=== Selected projects ===
- 1995-1998 (DFG): Avesta and Rigveda: Electronic Analysis
- 1995-1999 (INTAS): The Georgian Verbal System
- 1999-2002 (Volkswagen Foundation, EUR 117,900): Caucasian Languages and Cultures: Electronic Documentation
- Since 2000 (DFG): Graduate School “Types of Clauses: Variation and Interpretation”
- 2002-2006 (Volkswagen Foundation, EUR 167,800): Endangered Caucasian Languages in Georgia
- 2003-2007 (Volkswagen Foundation): Palimpsest Manuscripts of Caucasian Provenience
- 2005-2009 (INTAS): Georgian Gospels
- 2005-2007 (Volkswagen Foundation, EUR 189,000): The Linguistic Situation in modern-day Georgia
- 2008-2014 (DFG, EUR 240,000): Old German Reference Corpus
- Since 2008 (BMBF): German Language Resource Infrastructure
- 2009 (Volkswagen Foundation, EUR 400,000): Aché Documentation Project
- Since 2009 (DFG/NEH, EUR 96,000): RELISH (Rendering Endangered Languages Lexicons Interoperable Through Standards Harmonization)
- Since 2009 (Volkswagen Foundation): Georgian Palimpsest Manuscripts
- 2010 (Google Inc., US$49,600): Corpus Caucasicum
- Since 2011 (HMWK, EUR 3,792,000): LOEWE Research Unit “Digital Humanities – Integrated Processing and Analysis of Text-based Corpora”
- Since 2011 (Volkswagen Foundation, EUR 299,600): Khinalug Documentation Project
- Since 2011 (DFG): Relative Clauses in a Typological View
- Since 2012 (Volkswagen Foundation, EUR 390,400): Georgian National Corpus
- Since 2022 (ERC): The Development of Literacy in the Caucasian Territories (DeLiCaTe)

== Selected publications ==
- 1977: Zur Syntax der infinitivischen Bildungen in den indogermanischen Sprachen [The syntax of infinitival formations in the Indo-European languages]. (Europäische Hochschulschriften, 21/3), 360 pp.; Frankfurt, Bern, Las Vegas: Lang 1978. Dissertation
- 1990: Iranica Armeno-Iberica. Studien zu den iranischen Lehnwörtern im Armenischen und Georgischen [Iranica Armeno-Iberica. A study of Iranian loan words in Armenian and Georgian], 451 + 389 pp.; Vienna: Austrian Academy of Sciences 1993. Inaugural dissertation.
- 1997: Index Galenicus. Wortformenindex zu den Schriften Galens [Index Galenicus. Word form index to the writings of Galen]. 2 volumes. Dettelbach: Röll.
- 2007: Gippert, Jost / Sarjveladze, Zurab / Kajaia, Lamara: The Old Georgian Palimpsest Codex Vindobonensis georgicus 2, edited by Jost Gippert in co-operation with Zurab Sarjveladze and Lamara Kajaia, 368 pp.; Turnhout: Brepols 2007.
- 2008: Gippert, Jost / Schulze, Wolfgang / Aleksidze, Zaza / Mahé, Jean-Pierre: The Caucasian Albanian Palimpsests of Mount Sinai, 2 vols., XXIV + 530 pp.; Turnhout: Brepols 2009.
- 2010: Gippert, Jost / Schulze, Wolfgang / Aleksidze, Zaza / Mahé, Jean-Pierre: The Caucasian Albanian Palimpsests of Mount Sinai. Vol. III: The Armenian Layer, edited by Jost Gippert., 220 pp.; Turnhout: Brepols 2010.
- 2018: Georgische Handschriften [Georgian manuscripts]. Wiesbaden: Reichert 2018.
