= BOM =

BOM, BoM or bom may refer to:

== Language ==
- Bom language, an endangered language of Sierra Leone
- Berom language (ISO 639 code: bom), a Plateau language of Nigeria

== Organisations ==
- Bank One Mauritius, a commercial bank based in Mauritius
- Barrel of Monkeys Productions, a Chicago-based arts-education organization
- Battle of Malta poker tournament
- Bureau of Meteorology, Australia
- Bureau of Mines (Republic of China), a Taiwan government agency

== People ==
- Bom, or Bawm people, an ethnic group in Bangladesh
- Bom Gillies (1925–2024), New Zealand soldier
- Klaas Bom (1937–2025), Dutch engineer
- Lars Bom (born 1961), Danish actor
- Park Bom (born 1984), South Korean singer

== Science ==
- BOM (psychedelic) (3,4,5,beta-tetramethoxyphenethylamine), a psychedelic drug

== Computing ==
- BOM (file format), a file format used in OS X installer packages
- Browser Object Model, the objects exposed by a Web browser
- Byte order mark (U+FEFF and others), a Unicode character

== Other uses ==
- Bōm (restaurant), a Michelin-starred Korean restaurant in New York City
- Builder's Old Measurement of a ship's cargo carrying capacity, England, 1650-1848
- Bromborough railway station, Merseyside, England, station code
- Chhatrapati Shivaji Maharaj International Airport, Mumbai, India, IATA airport code
- Bill of materials, a list of materials and parts needed to manufacture a product
- Book of Mormon, a religious text of the Latter Day Saint movement, published in 1830
- Bayesian-optimal mechanism, a concept in mathematics that is related to probability distribution

== See also ==
- "Bom Bom", a 2012 song by Sam and the Womp
- Baum, surname
- Bomb (disambiguation)
