= Bomb (disambiguation) =

A bomb is an explosive device.

Bomb or its variants may also refer to:

== Film and television ==
- Box-office bomb, a film considered unprofitable during its theatrical run
- "Bomb" (The Young Ones), an episode of The Young Ones
- "Bombs", a Series B episode of the television series QI (2004)

== Literature ==
- Bomb (book), Bomb: The Race to Build—and Steal—the World's Most Dangerous Weapon, a 2012 book by Steve Sheinkin
- Bomb, a novel by Les Edgerton
- Bomb (magazine), an art magazine

== Military ==
- Bomb (tank), a famous Canadian Sherman tank from WW II
- Bomb or Bomb vessel, a naval ship built around one or more mortars as its primary armament

== Music ==
- "Bombs" (song), by Faithless, 2006
- "Bomb", a song by Chris Brown from his 2011 album F.A.M.E.
- "Bomb", a 2019 song by AleXa
- "BOMB!", a 2022 song by Shreya Jain, Girish Nakod and Shashwat Sachdev from the Indian film Attack: Part 1
- "Bomb", a 2023 song by P1X3L
- "Bomb", a 2024 song by ¥$ from the album Vultures 2
- Bomb (EP), by Illit, 2025
- Dropping bombs, a jazz percussion technique popularized by Kenny Clarke

== Science ==
- Bomb (meteorology)
- Bomb calorimeter
- Volcanic bomb, a mass of molten rock ejected from a volcano

== Sports ==
- Bomb (American football), a distinctly arching pass
- Bomb (kick), a high kick used in various codes of football

== Computing ==
- Bomb (icon), used on Mac OS and Atari TOS when a fatal error occurs
- Fork bomb, a type of denial-of-service attack that overloads a system through process replication
- Logic bomb, a form of malicious software

== Other uses ==
- Bomb shot, a type of alcoholic mixed drink made by dropping a shot into another drink
- Bomb, Australian slang for a jalopy
- Dahlbusch Bomb, a non-explosive emergency evacuation device for use in mining, called a "bomb" because of its shape
- Bomb (village), a village in Punjab, India
- Bomb (Angry Birds), the loon from the video game franchise Angry Birds
- Bomb, a dou dizhu terminology for the poker hand "four-of-a-kind"

== See also ==
- "Bomb Bomb", a 2019 song by Kard
- Bomba (disambiguation)
- Bombed (disambiguation)
- Bombe (disambiguation)
- Bomber (disambiguation)
- The Bomb (disambiguation)
- Explosion
- Shell (projectile)
- Yarn bombing
- Baum (surname)
- BOM (disambiguation), including Bom
