= Ngonyi =

- Location in Burundi
- Coordinates: 3°0′15″S 29°26′54″E
- Country: Burundi
- Province: Bubanza Province
- Commune: Commune of Musigati
- Time zone: UTC+2 (Central Africa Time)

Ngonyi is a village in the Commune of Musigati in Bubanza Province in northwestern Burundi.
