= Miheto =

- Location in Burundi
- Coordinates: 3°13′42″S 29°27′55″E
- Country: Burundi
- Province: Bubanza Province
- Commune: Commune of Rugazi
- Time zone: UTC+2 (Central Africa Time)

Miheto is a village in the Commune of Rugazi in Bubanza Province in western Burundi.
