= Gitabi =

- Location in Burundi
- Coordinates: 3°12′25″S 29°28′18″E
- Country: Burundi
- Province: Bubanza Province
- Commune: Commune of Rugazi
- Time zone: UTC+2 (Central Africa Time)

Gitabi is a village in the Commune of Rugazi in Bubanza Province in north western Burundi.
