= Bomba =

Bomba may refer to:

== Places ==
- Bomba, Belize, a village in the Belize District of Belize
- Bomba, Abruzzo, a comune in Province of Chieti, Italy
- Bomba, Libya, a village near the city of Derna in Libya
- Gulf of Bomba, a body of water in the Mediterranean Sea on the northern coast of Libya
- Lago di Bomba, a lake in Province of Chieti, Abbruzzo Region, Italy

== Music ==
- Bomba (Ecuador), a musical style of Ecuador
- Bomba (Puerto Rico), a musical style of Puerto Rico
- Bomba (band), an Australian band
- "Bomba" (song), 2017 single by Aggro Santos
- "Bomba", 2017 single by Stoja
- "Bomba", 2013 song by Sean Kingston from Back 2 Life
- "Bomba", 2007 song by Edo Maajka

== People ==
- Bomba (surname)
- Bomba (tribe), a tribe of Azad Kashmir, Pakistan
- Bomba Jawara, Sierra Leonean politician
- Ferdinand II of the Two Sicilies, called re bomba ("King Bomb")

== Other uses ==
- Bomba (cryptography), the Polish device for breaking the Enigma cryptographic machine
- Bomba (genre), a Filipino film genre
- Bomba rice, a Spanish variety of rice
- Bomba, the Jungle Boy, a series of books by Roy Rockwood that later became a film series
  - Bomba, the Jungle Boy (film), a 1949 American film about Bomba, the Jungle Boy
- Malaysian Fire and Rescue Department or Bomba
- Bombilla, also known as bomba, a drinking straw used for drinking mate
- Berliner (doughnut), commonly known in Venezuela as bomba

== See also ==
- Bamba (disambiguation)
- Bomb (disambiguation)
- Bombe (disambiguation)
- Bombo (disambiguation)
- Ferdinand II of the Two Sicilies (1810–1859), nicknamed "King Bomba"
- La Bomba (disambiguation)
- Tsar Bomba, the popular name for the Soviet RDS-220 (in Cyrillic: РДС-220) hydrogen bomb, the most powerful nuclear weapon ever detonated
  - Tsar Bomba (disambiguation)
