= Kwirarire =

- Location in Burundi
- Coordinates: 3°9′48″S 29°30′46″E
- Country: Burundi
- Province: Bubanza Province
- Commune: Commune of Rugazi
- Time zone: UTC+2 (Central Africa Time)

Kwirarire is a village in the Commune of Rugazi in Bubanza Province in western Burundi.
