= Karonge =

Karonge may refer to:

- Karonge, Bubanza, Burundi
- Karonge, Rugazi, Burundi
