= Kinyasheshe =

- Location in Burundi
- Coordinates: 3°11′52″S 29°30′14″E
- Country: Burundi
- Province: Bubanza Province
- Commune: Commune of Rugazi
- Time zone: UTC+2 (Central Africa Time)

Kinyasheshe is a village in the Commune of Rugazi in Bubanza Province in western Burundi.
