= Zhar =

Zhar may mean:

- Zhar (Great Old One), a fictional Cthulhu Mythos deity of H. P. Lovecraft
- Zhar Lestin, a fictional character in Star Wars: Knights of the Old Republic
- Zhar language, a dialect of Jarawa language in Nigeria
- Zhar, Nyuksensky District, Vologda Oblast, a place in Russia
- Zhar, Syamzhensky District, Vologda Oblast, a place in Russia
- Z'har, a 2009 film
- Žar Mountain, a mountain in Kosovo

== See also ==
- Tsar
- Zharov, a Russian male surname, and its feminine counterpart Zharova
- Nabil El Zhar (born 1986), French professional footballer
