= Gashashara =

- Location in Burundi
- Coordinates: 3°11′3″S 29°30′59″E
- Country: Burundi
- Province: Bubanza Province
- Commune: Commune of Rugazi
- Time zone: UTC+2 (Central Africa Time)

Gashashara is a village in the Commune of Rugazi in Bubanza Province in north western Burundi.
