= Masama =

- Location in Burundi
- Coordinates: 3°12′15″S 29°27′36″E
- Country: Burundi
- Province: Bubanza Province
- Commune: Commune of Rugazi
- Time zone: UTC+2 (Central Africa Time)

For the district in Sulawesi, Indonesia see Masama, Sulawesi

Masama is a village in the Commune of Rugazi in Bubanza Province in western Burundi.
