= Tsar (disambiguation) =

Tsar, or tzar, csar, or czar, is a title used for monarchs or supreme rulers of Eastern Europe and Russia.

Tsar, TSAR, tzar, csar, or czar may also refer to:

- Czar (political term), an informal title used for certain high-level officials in the US and UK

== Arts and entertainment ==
- Tsar (film), a 2009 Russian film
- Tsar (band), an American rock band
- The Czars, an American rock band
- "Czar", a song by Frank Black from the 1994 album Frank Black
- Tzar: The Burden of the Crown, a 2000 computer game

== People ==
- Staci Czar, American politician

== Places ==
- Czar, Missouri, U.S.
- Czar, West Virginia, U.S.
- Czar, Alberta, Canada
- Zar, Azerbaijan, or Tsar (Ծար)

== Other uses ==
- TSAR Publications, a Canadian publisher
- The TSAR supergroup in biology, which includes the SAR supergroup, named for telonemids, stramenopiles, alveolates, and rhizarians
- Camellia japonica 'The Czar', a camellia cultivar
- Vladimir Kononov (Donetsk People's Republic), nom de guerre Tsar, a Donetsk militia leader
- The Czar of The Style Invitational, a judge of the humor contest

== See also ==
- Kaiser (disambiguation)
- Keizer (disambiguation)
- TSAR (disambiguation)
- Zhar (disambiguation)
- Tsar Bomba (disambiguation)
