= Bombo =

Bombo may refer to:

== Music ==
- Bombo (musical), a 1921 Broadway production starring Al Jolson
- "Bombo" (song), by Norwegian singer Adelén
- Bombo criollo or just bombo, a family of Latin American drums
- Bombo legüero, an Argentine drum
- An 18th-century term for tremolo
- An album from Swedish rock band Bonafide

== Places ==
- Bombo, New South Wales, a suburb of the Municipality of Kiama, Australia
  - Bombo railway station a railway station where it is located
- Bombo, Uganda, a town in Luwero District
- A ward in Same District, Tanzania

== People ==
- Aama Bombo, shaman in the Nepalese Tamang tradition
- Bombo Calandula (born 1983), Angolan former team handball player
- Bombo Rivera (born 1952), Puerto Rican former Major League Baseball player nicknamed "Bombo"

== Other uses ==
- Bombo Radyo Philippines, a large Filipino radio network
- SS Bombo, an Australian coastal freighter that foundered in 1949
- Bombo (video game), a 1986 British game on the Commodore 64
- Bombo, the ball used in chaza, a Colombian racquet sport

== See also ==
- Bomba (disambiguation)
- Bombe (disambiguation)
