= Taiwan Black Jade =

Type of serpentine jade

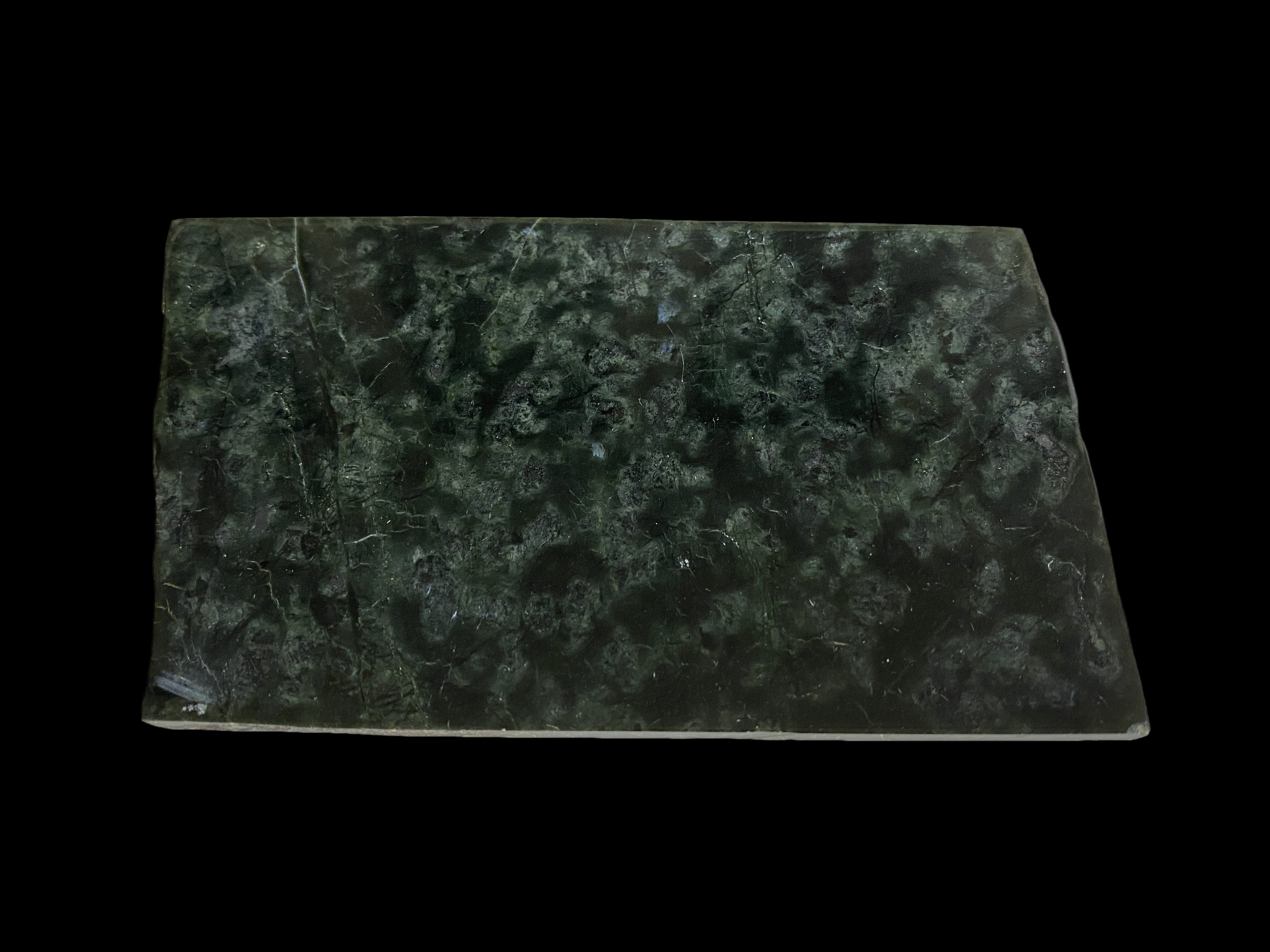

General
- Category: Silicate
- Formula: (Fe,Mg)_{3}Si_{2}O_{5}(OH)_{4}
- Crystal system: Monoclinic

Identification
- Color: Dark green - Black
- Crystal habit: Massive, Fibrous
- Fracture: Conchoidal, Uneven
- Mohs scale hardness: 4.5
- Luster: Greasy, Vitreous
- Streak: White
- Diaphaneity: Opaque - Translucent
- Specific gravity: 2.4-2.8
- Refractive index: 1.56-1.70

Taiwan Black Jade is a type of serpentine jade, primarily composed of minerals such as antigorite and magnetite. It exhibits colors ranging from dark green to black. It is found in the Fengtian area of Hualien County, Taiwan. It was discovered during the mining of Taiwan Jade in the 1960s and 1970s but was not at that time recognized as a new variety of mineral. In the 2010s researchers conducted studies and analysis that identified it as a new type of serpentine jade.

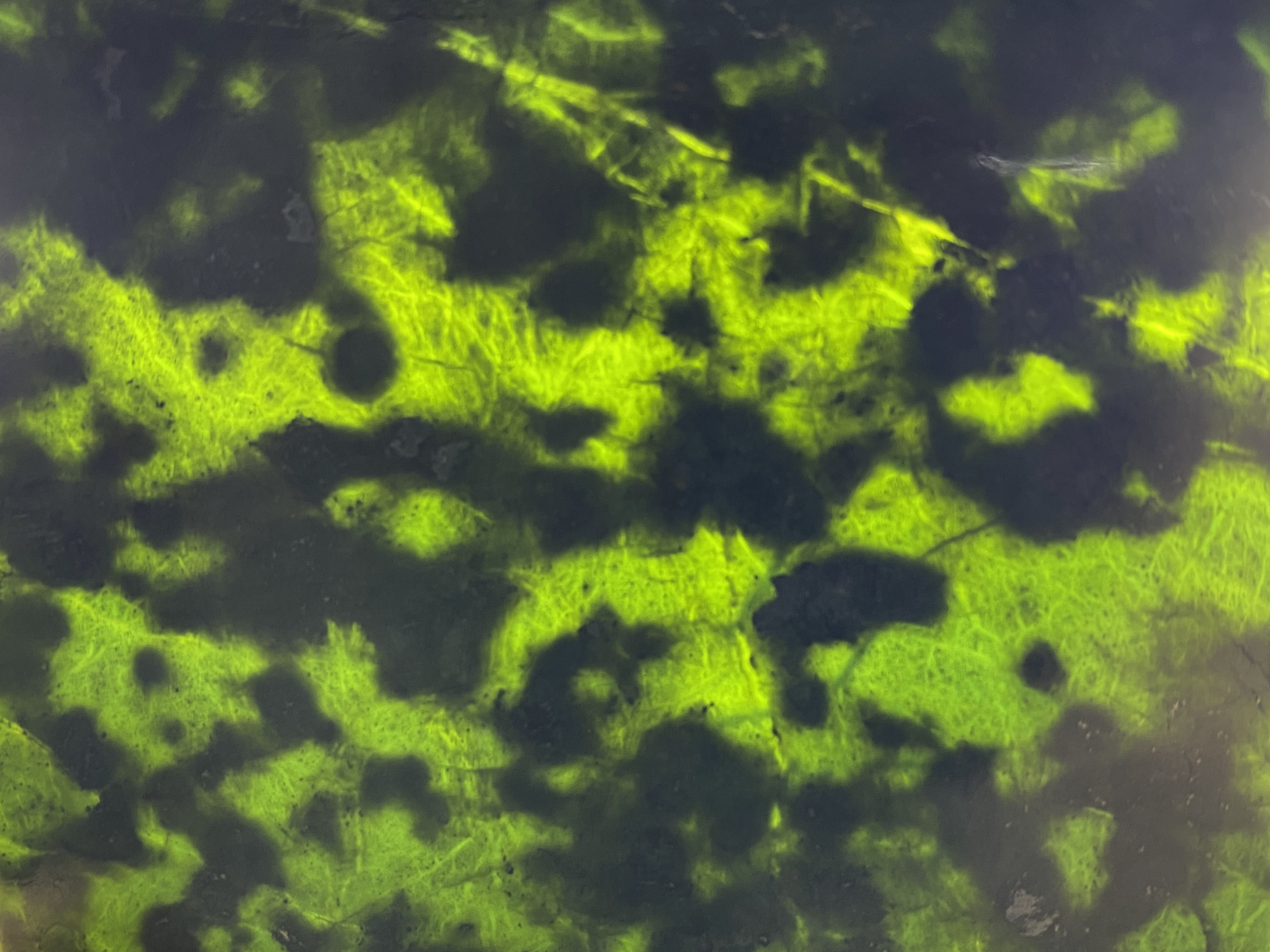
Translucency of Taiwan Black Jade

== Discovery ==
During the 1960s and 1970s, the Fengtian area in Hualien County, Taiwan, experienced a significant boom in the production of Taiwan Jade. During mining operations, yellow-green translucent serpentine was discovered, although its occurrence was sporadic and it was not individually extracted and utilized. Instead, it was sold as Taiwan Jade. It wasn't until the 2010s that the Bureau of Mines, Ministry of Economic Affairs actively supported jade industry professionals in developing Taiwan Black Jade, a new variety of serpentine jade. This type of jade exhibits yellow, green, and yellow-green colors under strong light, along with interspersed black spots and a unique texture, distinguishing itself from Chinese serpentine jade known as Xiuyan Jade.

== Name ==
In the 1978 publication A Mineralogical Study Of The Fengtien Nephrite Deposits Of Hualien, Taiwan by the National Science Council of the Executive Yuan, the serpentine jade found in Taiwan was referred to as “Bowenite”. However, in 2010 Dr. Fang Jiann-Neng from the National Taiwan Museum conducted mineralogical research, and suggested naming this gem-grade serpentine jade as “Taiwan Black Jade” in an article published in 2011. This distinction was made to differentiate it from other black jades that are commonly referred to as “Black Jade,” based on their appearance.

== Mineral Composition ==
Taiwan Black Jade contains seven different minerals, including antigorite, chrysotile, magnetite, hematite, chromite, forsterite, and dolomite, with antigorite and magnetite being the main minerals. Due to the presence of magnetite, a natural magnetic mineral, Taiwan Black Jade exhibits strong magnetism.

== Geological Formation ==
Taiwan is located on the subduction zone between the Philippine Sea Plate and the Eurasian Plate, and the East Rift Valley serves as the suture zone where the two plates collide. Within this suture zone and its vicinity, various geological processes occur, including metamorphism, pyrogenesis, and hydrothermal alteration. In the deep crust, minerals such as olivine and pyroxene in ultramafic rocks or peridotites interact with water from the surrounding layers, leading to the formation of serpentine group minerals through a process called serpentinization, which is also the reason for the formation of Taiwan Black Jade.

== Production and Distribution ==
Taiwan Black Jade occurs in the contact zones of serpentinite, black schist, and green schist. It appears in the form of convex lenses or thin layers, exhibiting a continuous and gradual transition with common serpentinite in the rock layers. It sometimes occurs independently and can also coexist with Taiwan Jade.

The main known production area of Taiwan Black Jade is within the serpentinite in the Fengtian area of Hualien. The serpentinite in this area consists of over ten layers, stretching for about 3 kilometers. The average thickness ranges from 10 to 30 meters, with a maximum thickness of up to 50 meters. The layers are separated by intervals of 50 to 120 meters. The coexistence of Taiwan Black Jade and Taiwan Jade can be found in previous mining sites, such as Lixin, Lijian, Tianxing, and Shanyi.

== Mining ==
Taiwan Black Jade has not yet been officially classified as a gemstone mineral by the Bureau of Mines, Ministry of Economic Affairs. There is also no official investigation and mining planned for Taiwan Black Jade. Therefore, the precise total reserves of the deposit cannot be estimated at this time.
