= Bomba (surname) =

Bomba is a surname. Notable people with the surname include:

- Andreas Bomba, German journalist and festival director
- Enrico Bomba (1922–1995), Italian film producer, director and screenwriter
- Jozef Bomba (1939–2005), Slovak footballer
- Nicky Bomba (born 1963), Australian musician and singer
- Ray Bomba (1907–1986), American sound editor
- Ty Bomba, American wargame designer
- Antoni Bomba (1868–1956), Polish politician, Member of Austrian State Council

== See also ==
- Flash Bomba
- Bomba (disambiguation)
- La Bomba (disambiguation)
