= Karonge, Rugazi =

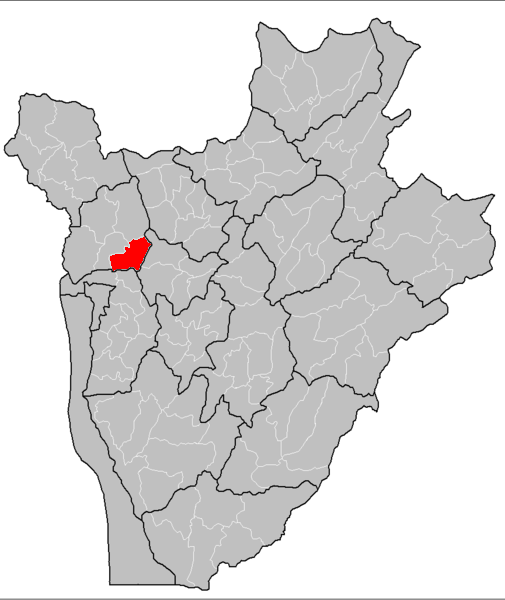

- Location in Burundi
- Coordinates: 3°13′46″S 29°27′0″E
- Country: Burundi
- Province: Bubanza Province
- Commune: Commune of Rugazi
- Time zone: UTC+2 (Central Africa Time)

Karonge, Rugazi is a village in the Commune of Rugazi in Bubanza Province in western Burundi.
