= Kinama, Bubanza =

Kinama
- Location in Burundi
- Coordinates: 3°11′48″S 29°31′6″E
- Country: Burundi
- Province: Bubanza Province
- Commune: Commune of Rugazi
- Time zone: UTC+2 (Central Africa Time)

Kinama is a village in the Commune of Rugazi in Bubanza Province in western Burundi.
