= Buvyuko =

- Location in Burundi
- Coordinates: 3°5′49″S 29°19′55″E
- Country: Burundi
- Province: Bubanza Province
- Commune: Commune of Bubanza
- Time zone: UTC+2 (Central Africa Time)

Buvyuko is a village in the Commune of Bubanza in Bubanza Province in north western Burundi.
