= Mitakataka =

Mitakataka 5
- Location in Burundi
- Coordinates: 3°8′10″S 29°21′55″E
- Country: Burundi
- Province: Bubanza Province
- Commune: Commune of Bubanza
- Time zone: UTC+2 (Central Africa Time)

Mitakataka, from "Umutakataka", a tree originating from Burundi, is a village in the Commune of Bubanza in Bubanza Province in north western Burundi. It is one of the province's most populous villages and is home to Canal River, an irrigation artificial river created in the aftermath of the country's decolonization. Notable people from the village are the honourable Manasse Nzobonimpa, a member of the Assembly and former governor of Bubanza and Nyabenda Pascal, a former president of the CNDD-FDD party.

The village is famously known for its huge paddy fields making it one of the richest villages and the best contributor to the province of Bubanza in terms of tax based on production. Paddy farming is therefore the main activity of the villagers. Other crops include palm oil, cassava, beans, etc. Before and after the 1993 Burundi Civil War, the village has been a rich source of gravel used in roads construction throughout the country.

Gahongore, a hill sitting at the center of the village is said to be rich in minerals although a concrete study is yet to be conducted
