= Bureau of Mines =

Bureau of Mines may refer to:

- Bureau of Mines (Taiwan) in Taiwan
- United States Bureau of Mines in the United States
