= Kinama =

Kinama is the name of several settlements in Burundi:

- Kinama, Bubanza
- Kinama, Bujumbura
- Kinama, Bururi
- Kinama, Cibitoke
- Kinama, Gitega
- Kinama, Kayanza
- Kinama, Muyinga
