= Bihembe =

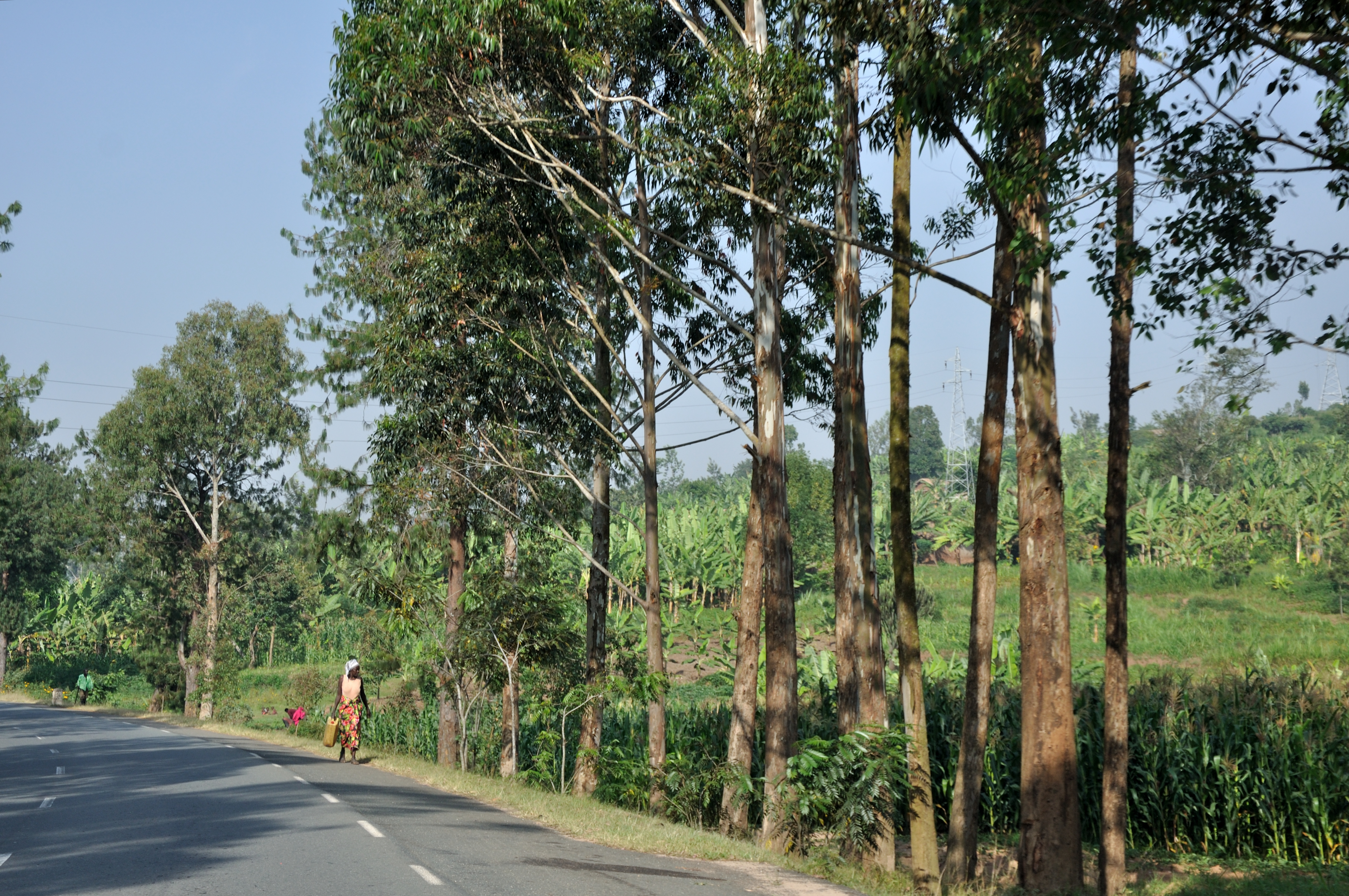
- Rwanda, roadside impressions along Road 3 between Kigali and Gitarama

- Location in Burundi
- Coordinates: 3°3′26″S 29°18′47″E
- Country: Burundi
- Province: Bubanza Province
- Commune: Commune of Bubanza
- Time zone: UTC+2 (Central Africa Time)

Bihembe is a village in the Commune of Bubanza in Bubanza Province in north western Burundi.
