= Penghu Wenstone =

Stone unearthed in Taiwan

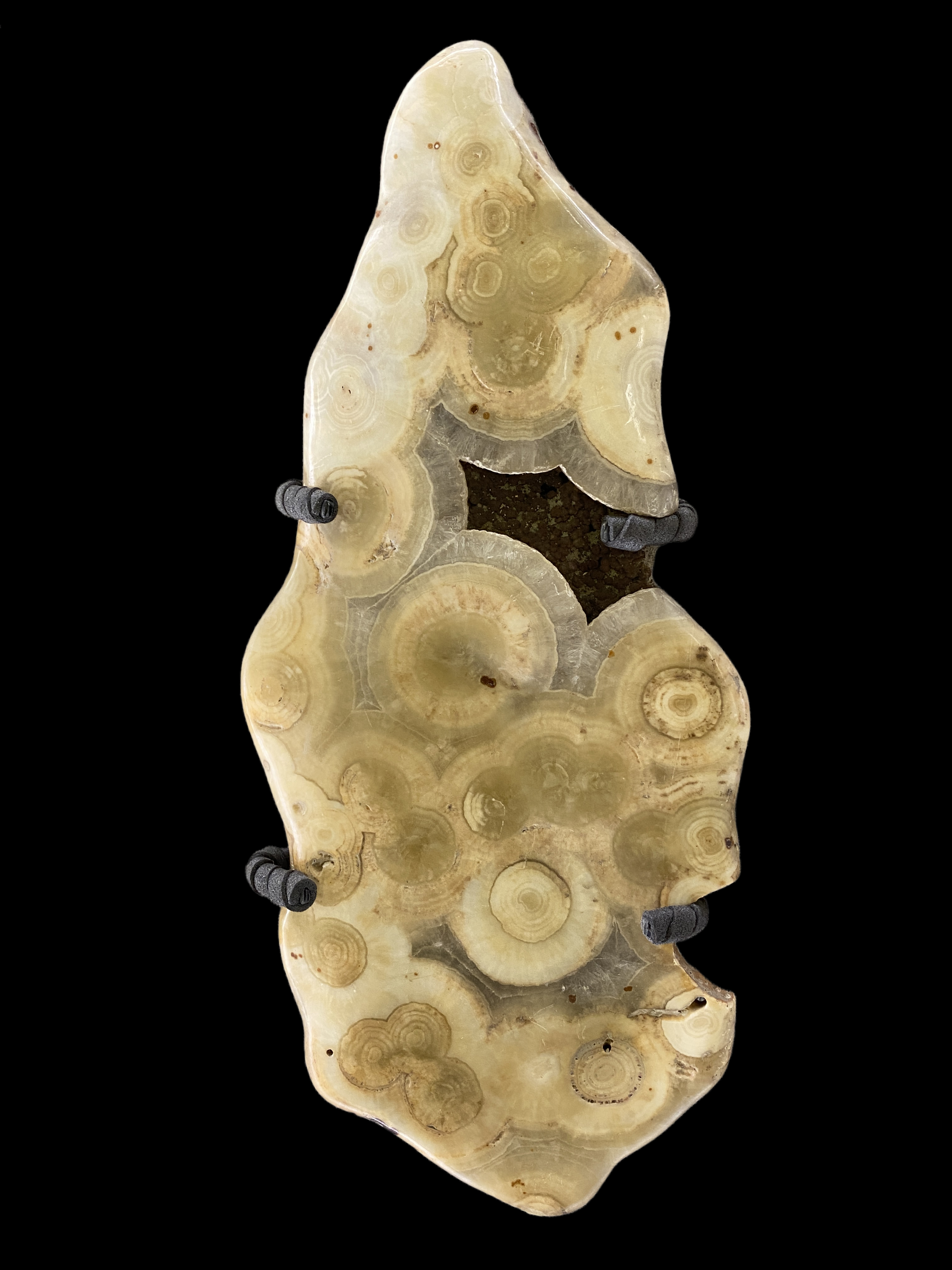
Collection of National Taiwan Museum

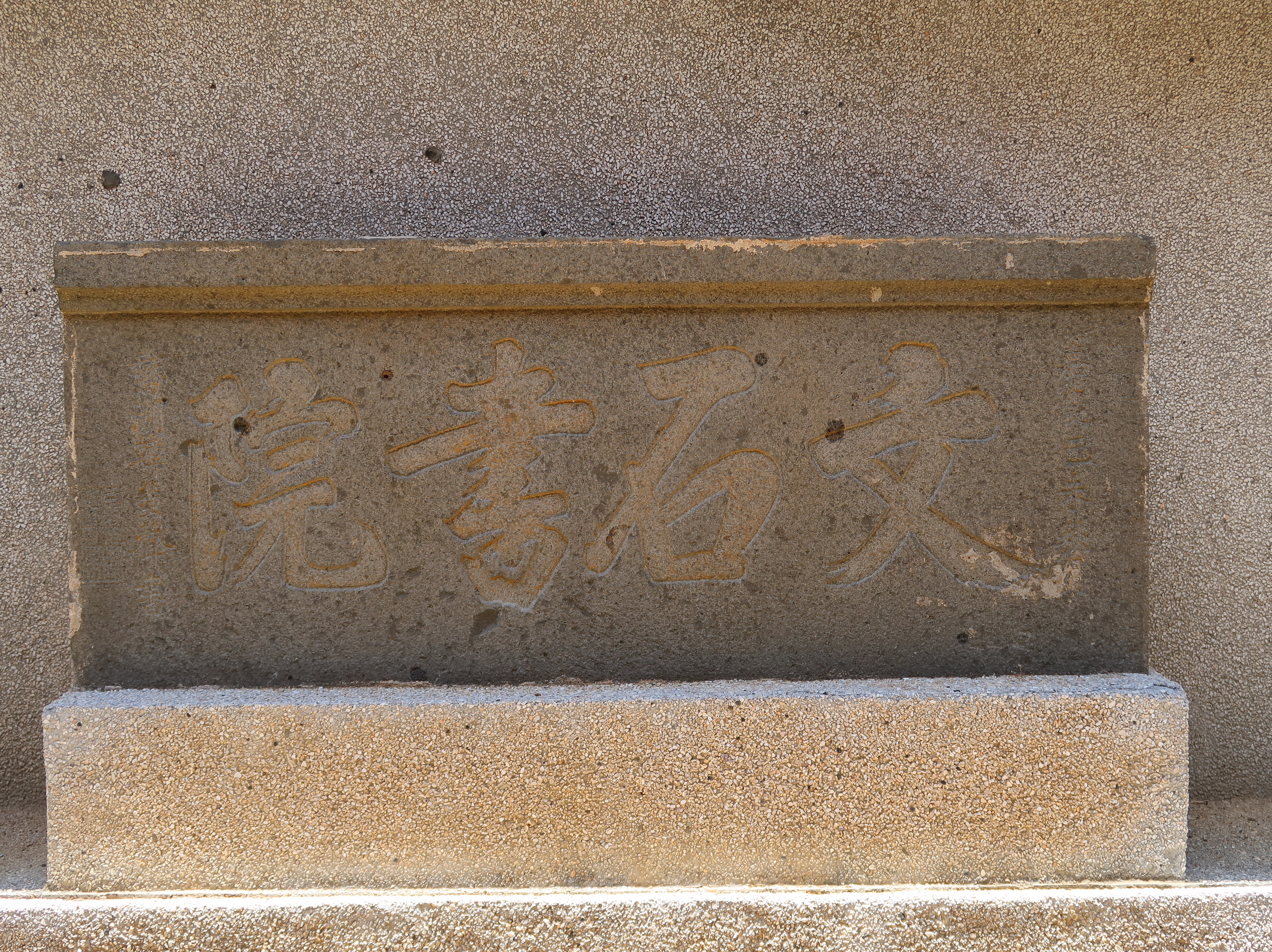
Plaque of Wenshi Academy

Penghu Wenstone (Chinese: 澎湖文石) is a stone extracted from vesicular basalt formations on the Penghu Islands, which is characterised by its distinctive concentric circular patterns.

== History ==
The term “Penghu Wenstone” first appeared in historical documentations during the first year of the Qianlong reign of the Qing Dynasty (1736). At the time, the local magistrate Zhou Yuren mentioned Penghu Wenstone in the “Brief History of Penghu” and described it as follows: “Penghu yields the Wenstone, extracted through the process of excavating and cleaving rocks at the foothills of Waiqian. Once subjected to grinding and polishing, the resulting patterns and texture exhibit captivating variations. The coloration exudes a gentle hue, devoid of overwhelming intensity or ostentation.”

During the 35th year of Qianlong’s reign (1770), Hu Jianwei, another local magistrate, also wrote in the Penghu Records - Native Product Record: “Wenstone, produced in Waiqian and Xiaochijiao, contains jade inside. Carve the unprocessed gemstone, and the jade shall reveal itself, adorned with an array of five distinct hues, intricately weaving mesmerizing patterns. The yellow is the most desired, and the natives value those with eye patterns above all”.

Wenshi Academy, established in the 32nd year of the Qianlong reign (1766), was named after the stone. Hu Jianwei wrote in the “Record of the Completion of Wenshi Academy”, “Wenstone is produced in Penghu and is highly valued in the world. The name of the Academy was derived from this stone.”

== Characteristics ==
In the article “Geology and Mineral Resources of the Penghu Islands,” Professor Lin Chao-Chi of the National Taiwan University mentioned that “places in the world where Wenstone is found are rare, with Italy being the only other known location apart from Taiwan.” Penghu Wenstone is characterized by its concentric circular patterns and vibrant colors, as well as strong contrasts between light and dark tones. The mining of Penghu Wenstone began in the early 20th century. The period from 1952 to 1961 was the heyday of the Penghu Wenstone industry and was under the guidance of government agencies (such as the Taiwan Provincial Bureau of Mines). As the known outcrops of Penghu Wenstone are gradually exhausted, they can now only be found in the excavation of harbors and road construction projects, there are sporadic sources of basalt containing Penghu Wenstone.
