= Manasse Nzobonimpa =

Manassé Nzobonimpa (born 1957 in Mitakataka, Bubanza) is a Burundian politician, a former colonel, Member of Parliament of the East African Legislative Assembly, Secretary General of the CNDD FDD and Governor of his native province of Bubanza.

In 2011, Manassé Nzobonimpa made public declarations accusing a group of officials in the ruling CNDD FDD of corruption, killings and other human rights violations. He then fled into exile with his family. Although media have reported him as living in Kenya, his official sources have not confirmed the information, nor has the Kenyan government.

A few months after the declarations, a group of members of Burundi's intelligence office along with two Ugandan policemen unsuccessfully attempted to arrest him in Kampala, Uganda. In an interview with Radio France Internationale Swahili Manassé declared to have recognized the group.

In 2015, Nzobonimpa criticized president Nkurunziza's search for a third term.
