= Butega =

- Location in Burundi
- Coordinates: 2°57′43″S 29°33′37″E
- Country: Burundi
- Province: Bubanza Province
- Commune: Commune of Bubanza
- Time zone: UTC+2 (Central Africa Time)

Butega is a village in the Commune of Bubanza in Bubanza Province in north western Burundi.
