= Kuwintaba =

- Location in Burundi
- Coordinates: 3°7′9″S 29°25′55″E
- Country: Burundi
- Province: Bubanza Province
- Commune: Commune of Bubanza
- Time zone: UTC+2 (Central Africa Time)
  - Summer (DST): Central Africa Time Zone

Kuwintaba is a village in the Commune of Bubanza in Bubanza Province in north western Burundi.
