= Bamba, Burundi =

Bamba
- Location in Burundi
- Coordinates: 02°59′21″S 29°24′52″E
- Country: Burundi
- Province: Bubanza Province
- Commune: Commune of Musigati
- Time zone: UTC+2 (Central Africa Time)

Bamba is a village in the Commune of Musigati in Bubanza Province in north western Burundi.
