= Bamba =

Bamba may refer to:

== Places ==
- Bamba, Burundi
- Bamba, Gao Region, a town in the Gao Region of Mali
- Bamba, Guinea
- Bamba, Kenya, a small town in the Ganze Constituency of Kenya
- Bamba, Mopti a rural town in Mali
- Bamba Puang, a name of a village in Enrekang Regency, South Sulawesi Province, Indonesia
- Bamba Street (Bamba Dori) (Japanese: バンバ通り), a downtown area in Utsunomiya City, Japan
- Shimbamba Station (Japanese: 新馬場駅), a railway station in Shinagawa, Tokyo, Japan

== Other uses ==
- Bamba (name), a given name and a surname (including a list of people with the name)
- Bamba (actress), Philippine actress
- Bamba (crater), on the planet Mars
- Bamba (snack), a peanut butter snack food made in Israel
- Bambera, a Spanish type of song form associated with flamenco
- British Association of Mindfulness-Based Approaches (BAMBA)
- Bamba (バンバ), a Japanese character in the film Kishiryu Sentai Ryusoulger
- Shirobamba (しろばんば), a Japanese autobiographical full-length novel
- Bambaşka Biri, internationally known as Another Love, a Turkish romantic mystery drama television series
- An Aruban musical instrument, see Music of the former Netherlands Antilles
- An alternate spelling for Quechua word pampa meaning plain, see Pampas
- an alternate name of the Amba people

== See also ==
- La Bamba (disambiguation)
- Baamba (disambiguation)
