= La Bamba =

La Bamba may refer to:

- La Bamba (film), a 1987 film based on the life of Ritchie Valens
- "La Bamba" (song), a folk song best known from a 1958 adaptation by Ritchie Valens
- La Bamba Mexican Restaurant, an American fast casual Tex-Mex restaurant chain

== See also ==
- Bamba (disambiguation)
- La Bomba (disambiguation)
