= Musigati =

- Location in Burundi
- Coordinates: 3°4′21″S 29°26′57″E
- Country: Burundi
- Province: Bubanza Province
- Commune: Commune of Musigati
- Time zone: UTC+2 (Central Africa Time)

Musigati is a town in the Commune of Musigati in Bubanza Province in north western Burundi.

It is the seat of the Commune of Musigati. To the east is the Kibira National Park.
