= Commune of Bubanza =

- Commune
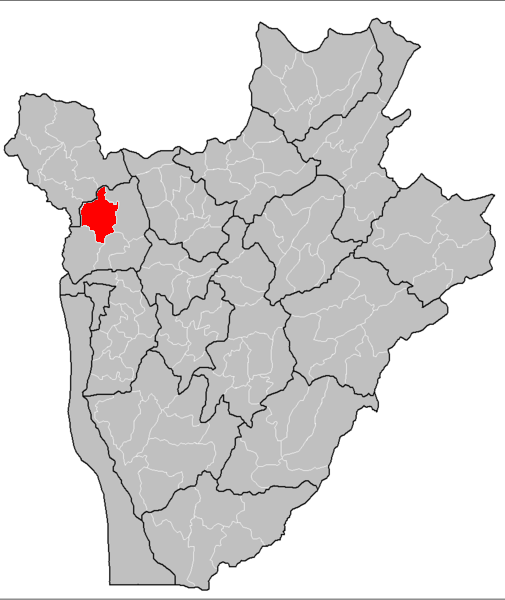
- Commune of Bubanza in Burundi
- Coordinates: 3°05′S 29°24′E
- Country: Burundi
- Province: Bubanza Province
- Administrative center: Bubanza

Area
  - Total: 224.82 km^{2} (86.80 sq mi)
- Elevation: 1,200 m (3,900 ft)

Population (2008 census)
  - Total: 83,678
  - Density: 372.20/km^{2} (963.99/sq mi)
- Time zone: UTC+2 (Central Africa Time)

Bubanza is a commune of Bubanza Province in north-western Burundi. The capital lies at Bubanza city.

== Towns and villages ==
· Bubanza (capital) · Bihembe · Butega · Buvyuko · Cabire · Kabwitika · Karonge · Kuwintaba · Mitakataka · Nyabugoye · Nyarusagare
