= Tsar Bomba (disambiguation) =

Tsar Bomba is a Soviet thermonuclear weapon. It may also refer to:

- Tsar Bomba, an album by Bride
- "Tsar Bomba", a song by Avatar on their 2014 album Hail the Apocalypse
- "Tsar Bomba", a song by JPEGMafia on his 2026 album Experimental Rap (album)

== See also ==
- Tsar (disambiguation)
- Bomba (disambiguation)
