= Da Bomb =

Da Bomb may refer to:

- Da Bomb (album), by rap duo Kris Kross
- "Da Bomb" (song), a single from Kris Kross's album

== See also ==
- The Bomb (disambiguation)
