= Yovanisik Caretsi =

American monk

- Born: 1560; Tsar, Upper Khachen, Safavid Empire
- Died: After 1621; Unknown
- Occupations: Monk, writer

Yovanisik Caretsi was an Armenian monk and writer of the Safavid Empire. He worked at the monastery of St. Thaddeus in Tsar, where he oversaw the repair of manuscripts. He also wrote an untitled chronicle which primarily deals with the closing years of Shah Tahmasp I's reign (1524–1576), the turbulent reigns of Ismail II (1576–1577) and Mohammad Khodabanda (1578–1587), and the opening years of Shah Abbas the Great (1588–1629).

== Biography ==
Born in Tsar (Armenian: Ծար, romanized: Tsar, also romanized as Car) near modern-day Kalbajar in 1560, Yovanisik became a monk at the local St. Thaddeus Monastery where he studied under Yovhannes, his paternal uncle. According to Peter Cowe, their similarity in names ("Yovanisik" being a diminutive of "Yovhannes") have led some scholars to confuse their identities. Yovanisik has also been confused with Nerses Gnunetsi, who held the same ecclesiastical rank. Gnunetsi gave Caretsi the license to preach and to teach as an avardapet. While at the monastic scriptorium, Yovanisik was involved in overseeing the repair of the older manuscripts, including a 14th-century work by Mattheos Jughayetsi. Yovanisik also wrote an untitled chronicle which he completed in 1600. Written in Armenian, the work primarily deals with the closing years of Shah Tahmasp I's reign, the turbulent reigns of Ismail II and Mohammad Khodabanda, and the opening years of Shah Abbas the Great. The work also includes some information about the life of Simon I of Kartli (Mahmud Khan) and the Long Turkish War (1593–1606). Yovanisik's name is inscribed on the south wall of a church in the village of Aghkilisa in Syunik. He died after 1621.

== Sources ==
- Cowe, Peter (2017). "The Safavid Empire: Yovanisik Carec'i". In Thomas, David; Chesworth, John A. (eds.). Christian-Muslim Relations. A Bibliographical History. Volume 10 Ottoman and Safavid Empires (1600–1700). Brill. ISBN 978-9004346048.
