= Bamba (name) =

Bamba is both a given name and surname. Notable people with the name include:

== Given name ==
- Bamba (actress), Philippine actress
- Bamba Dieng (born 2000), Senegalese professional footballer
- Bamba Qadin, Egyptian princess
- Bamba Müller, Egyptian wife of the Maharaja of Lahore
- Bamba Sutherland, last of the Punjab royalty
- Bamba (バンバ), a Japanese character in the film Kishiryu Sentai Ryusoulger

== Surname ==
- Aladji Bamba (born 2006), French footballer
- Ahmed Tijani "TJ" Bamba (born 2001), American professional basketball player
- Amadou Bamba, Muslim religious leader and founder of Mouridism
- Anderson Bamba, Brazilian footballer Anderson Soares de Oliveira
- Axel Bamba (born 1999), Switzerland professional footballer
- Bambadjan Bamba, Ivorian-American actor and filmmaker
- Demba Bamba (born 1998), French rugby union
- Ibrahima Bamba (born 2002), Italian professional footballer
- Hassoma Bino Bamba (born 1990), Ivorian former professional footballer
- Jonathan Bamba, French footballer
- Mitsugu Bamba (絆播 貢), a Japanese character animation in Vlad Love
- Mo Bamba, American basketball player
- Mory Bamba (born 2002), Ivorian footballer
- Mory Bamba (American football) (born 2000), American football player
- Musemestre Bamba (born 1971), Congolese footballer
- Paul Bamba (1988/1989–2024), Puerto Rican boxer
- Rayan Bamba (born 2004), French footballer
- Samuel Bamba (born 2004), German professional footballer
- Siaka Bamba (born 1989), Ivorian footballer
- Sol Bamba (1985–2024), French-Ivorian footballer
- Yuki Bamba (馬場 悠企, born 1986), Japanese footballer for Suphanburi F.C. in Thai League 2
- Yuka Bamba (辻横 由佳), born Yuka Tsujiyoko, Japanese video game music composer
- Taku Bamba (番場琢, born 1982), Japanese professional racing driver, who most recently competed in the Super GT series

== See also ==
- Bamba (disambiguation)
