= Bomber (disambiguation) =

A bomber is a military aircraft that delivers bombs or other explosives, or a person who carries out bombings (Category:Bombers (people)).

Bomber or Bombers may also refer to:

== Books, films and games ==
- Bomber (novel), a 1970 historical fiction novel by Len Deighton
- Bomber (1941 film), a short documentary
- Bomber (1982 film), a comedy
- Bomber (2009 film), by Paul Cotter
- Bomber (video game), for the Macintosh computer
- Bombers (web series), a 2019 sports drama web series

== Music ==
- The Bombers (band) a short lived Australian dance duo
- Bomber (album), a 1979 album by Motörhead
  - Bomber (song), the album's title song
- Bombers (David Bowie song), 1971
- Bombers (Tubeway Army song), 1978
- 'Bombers', a 1943 Soviet adaptation by Leonid Utyosov of the song Comin' In on a Wing and a Prayer by The Song Spinners

== Sports teams ==
- Battle Creek Bombers, an American minor league baseball team
- Bronx Bombers, nickname for the New York Yankees baseball team
- Brooks Bombers, baseball team in the Western Canadian Baseball League
- Brisbane Bombers, a proposed Australian professional rugby league NRL expansion franchise
- Chicago Brown Bombers, a former American baseball team in the Negro Major League and the United States League
- Essendon Football Club in the Australian Football League, also known as the Essendon Bombers
- Ithaca Bombers, an American collegiate football team
- JRU Heavy Bombers, the varsity team of Jose Rizal University of Manila
- Kapunda Football Club in South Australia's Barossa, Light and Gawler Football Association, also known as the Kapunda Bombers
- St. Louis Bombers Rugby Football Club
- St. Xavier Bombers, the sports teams of St. Xavier High School in Cincinnati, Ohio
- Windham Bombers, the sports teams of Windham High School in Ohio
- Winnipeg Blue Bombers, a Canadian Football League team

== Other uses ==
- Bomber (nickname), a list of people
- Bomber (computer virus)
- Category:Bombers (people), people who make and / use illegal home-made bombs
- a beer bottle that holds 22 U.S. fl oz (650.6 ml; 22.9 imp fl oz)

== See also ==
- Flight jacket, a jacket also known as a 'bomber jacket'
