= The Bomb =

The Bomb may refer to:

- A nuclear weapon, from "the atomic bomb"
- The Bomb (film), PBS-TV documentary about the history of nuclear weapons
- The Bomb, BBC radio documentary by D. G. Bridson on consequences of nuclear bombing of Britain
- The Bomb, history written by Howard Zinn
- bombe, a device used by British cryptanalysts during World War II to help decipher messages encoded by the German Enigma machine
- The Bomb (Harris novel), a 1909 novel by Frank Harris about the Haymarket affair
- The Bomb (Taylor novel), a 1995 young adult novel by Theodore Taylor
- "The Bomb", fourth episode of the 1966 Doctor Who serial The Ark
- "The Bomb! (These Sounds Fall into My Mind)", a 1995 song by The Bucketheads
- "The Bomb", a 2007 single by New Young Pony Club
- The Bomb (band), a Chicago punk band featuring Jeff Pezzati of Naked Raygun
- "The Bomb", a song by Bitter:Sweet from the 2008 album Drama
- "The Bomb" a song by Florence and the Machine from the 2022 album Dance Fever

== See also ==
- Da bomb (disambiguation)
- Bomb (disambiguation)
