= Bomber (nickname) =

Bomber or The Bomber, as a nickname, may refer to the following people:

- Chris Bombolas (born 1960), former Australian politician and sports journalist
- Martyn Bradbury (born 1974), left-wing New Zealand media commentator and radio and TV host
- George Brown (footballer born 1903) (1903–1948), English football player and manager
- John Brown (footballer, born 1962), Scottish football player and manager
- Tony Brown (footballer, born 1945) (born 1945)
- Bernard Chanda (1952–1993), Zambian footballer nicknamed "the Bomber"
- Sir Arthur Harris, 1st Baronet (1892–1984), air chief marshal of the Royal Air Force known as "Bomber Harris"
- Chris Harris (speedway rider) (born 1982)
- Tommy Harris (rugby) (1927–2006), Welsh rugby league footballer
- Eoin Liston (born 1957), Irish Gaelic footballer
- Joseph Mermans (1922–1996), Belgian footballer nicknamed "The Bomber"
- Gerd Müller (1945–2021), German footballer nicknamed "Der Bomber der Nation"
- Yuji Nakazawa (born 1978), Japanese footballer
- John Peard (born 1945), Australian former rugby league footballer and coach
- Hamdi Salihi (born 1984), Albanian footballer nicknamed "The Bomber"
- Kevin Sheldon (born 1956), English former footballer
- Mark Thompson (footballer) (born 1963), former Australian rules footballer known as "Bomber Thompson"
- Maurice Van Robays (1914–1965), American Major League Baseball player

== See also ==
- Charlie Conacher (1909–1967), Canadian National Hockey League player nicknamed "The Big Bomber"
- Daryle Lamonica (born 1941), American Football League and National Football League quarterback nicknamed "The Mad Bomber"
- Joe Louis (1914–1981), African-American boxer and heavyweight world champion nicknamed "The Brown Bomber"
