= Playmakers Laboratory =

Chicago-based arts-education organization

PlayMakers Laboratory (PML), formerly Barrel of Monkeys, is an arts-education and theater ensemble based in Chicago that works in under-served Chicago Public Schools. Founded by Erica Halverson and Halena Kays in 1997, PML consists of actors, musicians and teaching-artists that run in-school residency writing workshops, an after-school program and a weekly public performance, That's Weird, Grandma. The company works with elementary students in writing workshops, later adapting the students' original works to the stage.

== History ==
Barrel of Monkeys was founded by Halverson and Kays shortly after their graduation from Northwestern University, where both were involved in Griffin's Tale. Beginning with one Albany Park school, Halverson and Kays expanded their creative writing workshops to "40 public schools, mostly underfunded, on the South and West sides." After the six-week residency, in which the students transition from group writing to individual writing, Halverson and Kays would then organize performances of the students' work to take place at the schools.

Barrel of Monkeys changed its name to PlayMakers Laboratory in 2019 due to concerns over the word "monkey".

== That's Weird, Grandma ==
Barrel of Monkeys also runs a public performance, That's Weird, Grandma, which consists of a rotating selection of the company's favorite children-authored plays. That's Weird, Grandma is performed in the Neo Futurarium, well known as the home of the Neo-Futurists, an experimental Chicago Theater company.

== Partnering Schools ==
For the 2009-2010 school year, Barrel of Monkeys worked with a dozen Chicago elementary schools, as well as a Loyola Park after-school program.

- Avondale Elementary
- Columbia Explorers Academy
- Thomas Chalmers Elementary School
- Dewey Academy
- Arthur Dixon Elementary
- Kohn Elementary
- New Field Primary School
- Little Village Academy
- New Sullivan Elementary
- Paderewski Elementary
- Stockton Elementary
- Trumbull

== Company ==
The company of Barrel of Monkeys consisted of

- Michelle Alba
- Christina Anthony
- Mikala Bierma
- Molly Brennan
- Brennan Buhl
- Marla Caceres
- Lacy Katherine Campbell
- Desiree Castro
- Kurt Chiang
- Carly Ciarrocchi
- Brandon Cloyd
- Erick Deshaun Dorris
- Amanda Farrar
- Maggie Fullilove-Nugent
- Ricardo Gamboa
- Sarah Garner
- Emjoy Gavino
- Samantha Gleisten
- Sarah Goeden
- Alex Goodrich
- Michael Govier
- Laura Grey
- Erica Halverson
- Ricky Harris
- Halena Kays
- Oona Kersey Hatton
- Luke Hatton
- Mary Winn Heider
- Gretchen Helmreich
- Jennifer Johnson
- Halena Kays
- Elizabeth Levy
- Michael Mahler
- Tom Malinowski
- Philip Markle
- Marika Mashburn
- Laura McKenzie
- Matthew Miller
- Meredith Ibey Milliron
- Tai Palmgren
- Caleb Probst
- Mike Przygoda
- Geoff Rice
- Joseph Schüpbach
- Alan Schmuckler
- Tim Simeone
- Tim Soszko
- Collin Souter
- Jason Sperling
- Kate Staiger
- Bradford Stevens
- Mari Stratton
- Katie Suib
- Zeke Sulkes
- Jeff Trainor
- Mike Tutaj
- Dixie Uffelman
- Rani Waterman
- Lindsey Noel Whiting
- Curtis Williams
- Donnell Williams
- Rachel Wilson
