= Browser Object Model =

The Browser Object Model (BOM) is a browser-specific convention referring to all the objects exposed by the web browser. Unlike the Document Object Model, there is no standard for implementation and no strict definition, so browser vendors are free to implement the BOM in any way they wish.

What is usually seen as a window displaying a document, the browser program sees as a hierarchical collection of objects. When the browser parses a document, it creates a collection of objects that define the document and detail how it should be displayed. The object the browser creates is known as the Document Object Model (DOM). It is part of a larger collection of objects that the browser makes use of. This collection of browser objects is collectively known as the Browser Object Model, or BOM.

The top level of the hierarchy is the window object, which contains the information about the window displaying the document. Some of its fields are objects themselves that describe the document and related information.
