= Zar, Azerbaijan =

Zar / Tsar Zar / Ծար
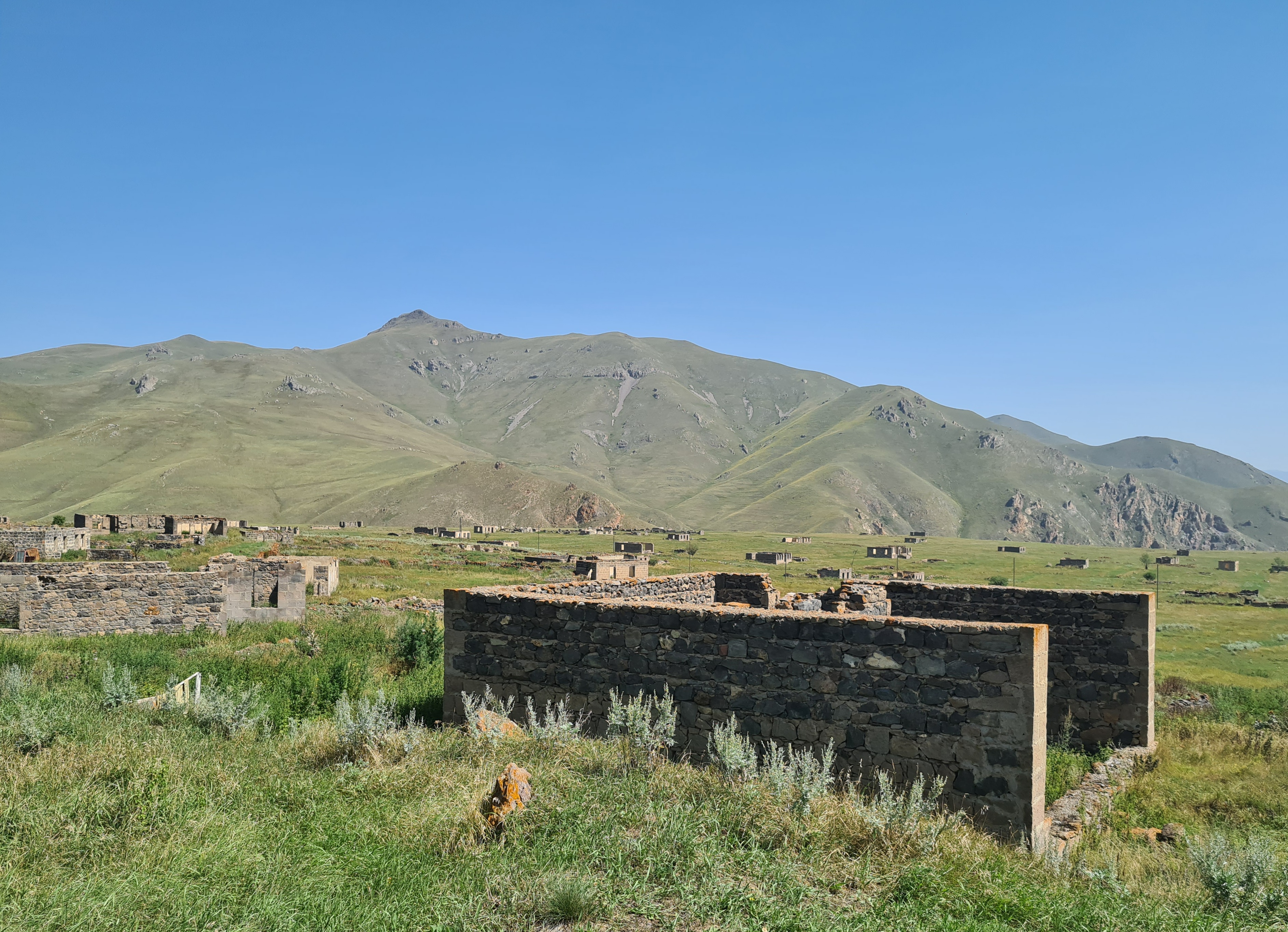

- Location within Azerbaijan Location within East Zangezur Economic Region
- Coordinates: 40°00′19″N 45°57′08″E
- Country: Azerbaijan
- District: Kalbajar

Population (2015)
  - Total: 83
- Time zone: UTC+4 (AZT)

Zar (Azerbaijani pronunciation: [zɑɾ]) or Tsar (Armenian: Ծար; pronounced [tsɑɾ], also Tzar) is a village in the Kalbajar District of Azerbaijan.

== Etymology ==
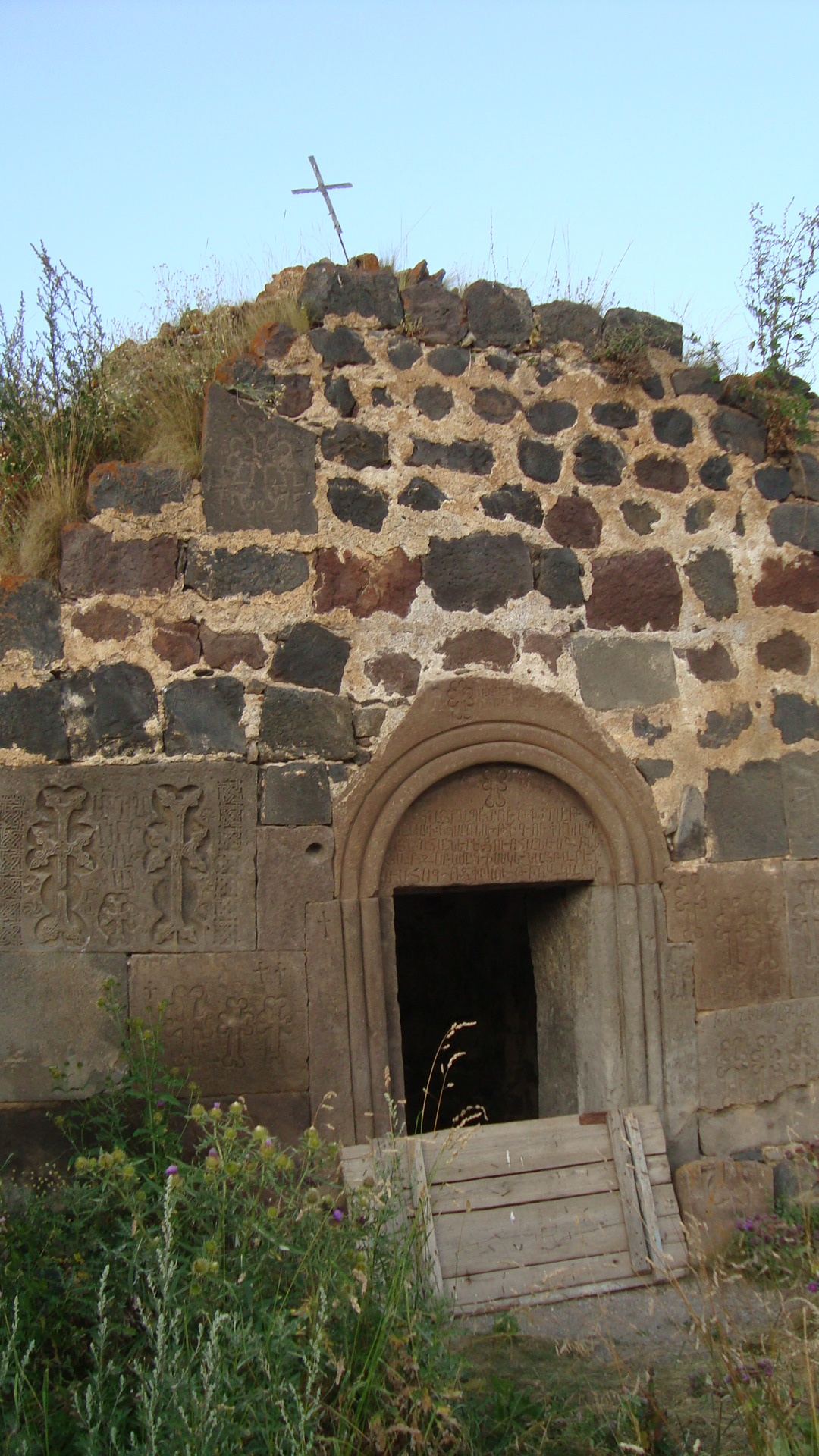
The 13th-century St. Sargis Church in the village

Armenian architectural historian Samvel Karapetyan writes that the settlement was first mentioned as "Tsar" in 1289. In the records of Dadivank Monastery in 1763, it is referred to as Mets Tsar (Armenian: Մեծ Ծար, lit. 'Great Tsar'), and in the 18th century, with an increased nomadic presence in the region, Zar, a derivative of Tsar, began to be used as a name for the village.

An Azerbaijani legend suggests a different origin. A poor young man named Zaza once lived in this village. He was in love with a girl named Nazı, but her parents were against their relationship. Zaza then decided to seek assistance from Nadir Shah. He planted a watermelon in a narrow-necked jar. The surprised shah approved and ordered that Nazı be given to Zaza. However, as soon as Nadir Shah left town, Nazı's family went to Zaza's house and murdered him before throwing his body into a well. Zaza's mother cried for several days after that. The name Zar was said to have derived from this legend as the Azerbaijani word "zarıldamaq" translates as "to sob".

== History ==
The history of the village goes back to the early medieval period, when it was the administrative center of the Kingdom of Artsakh's canton of Tsar. Until the 11th to 12th centuries, the village went by the name of Vaykunik (Armenian: Վայկունիք). In 1250, a sectarian peasant movement was recorded to have taken place in the village of Tsar in Armenia.

In the 12th and 13th centuries, the Armenian Dopian dynasty, closely related to the Zakarids, established itself in Tsar. During the invasions of Timur in the 14th century, the population of the region of Tsar was almost totally massacred. However, the Dopian principality survived, with the region of Tsar coming to serve as a stronghold and refuge for Armenian refugees from regional conflicts. In the late 16th century, Tsar came under Persian rule, with the Dopian meliks preserving their titles as the rulers of the Melikdom of Tsar, legitimized by an edict in 1603 by Shah Abbas. In the late 17th century, the melikdom of Tsar was incorporated into the melikdoms of Jraberd and Sotk. In the middle of the 18th century, Armenian historian Yesai Hasan-Jalalyan of the princely Hasan-Jalalyan family, states that:

... the Grand Duke Hasan owned [the fortresses] Akna, Handaberd, Sotk, Shagvak, and many other gavars (counties), among which he most of all loved the village of Tsar - a fiefdom and a reward for courage, for which the Armenian rulers paid with the price of [their] blood.

Beginning in 1724, an exodus of the Armenian population of the region took place. From the late 18th century and onwards, there was an increased Turkish and Kurdish nomadic presence in the region. In the early 19th century, the village was destroyed by the armies of the Ottoman Empire. Archbishop and scholar Makar Barkhutariants visited Tsar in 1880, noting the many remaining tombs and khachkars around the village, with many having been broken and inscriptions having been erased. The cathedral (or "large temple") in the centre of the village was still largely preserved at this time, with a khachkar on its walls with an inscription that read "I Melik, and my god-son Akutin, and my brother Mkhitar erected this cross in year 1225".

The village was located in the Armenian-occupied territories surrounding Nagorno-Karabakh, coming under the control of ethnic Armenian forces during the First Nagorno-Karabakh War in the early 1990s. The village subsequently became part of the breakaway Republic of Artsakh as part of its Shahumyan Province. The village was handed over to Azerbaijan on 25 November 2020 as part of the 2020 Nagorno-Karabakh ceasefire agreement.

== Historical heritage sites ==
Historical heritage sites in and around the village include medieval tombstones, khachkars from between the 12th and 17th centuries, a 12th/13th-century castle and chapel, the church of Surb Grigor (Armenian: Սուրբ Գրիգոր, lit. 'St. Gregory') consecrated in 1274, the church of Surb Sargis (Armenian: Սուրբ Սարգիս, lit. 'St. Sargis') consecrated in 1279, a 13th-century bridge, and the 17th-century church of Surb Astvatsatsin (Armenian: Սուրբ Աստվածածին, lit. 'Holy Mother of God'). Two of the four churches of Tsar of as well as two nearby monasteries have been destroyed. Armenian churches, monasteries and cemeteries in the village started to be destroyed by Kurds at the end of the 19th century, and the destruction continued on a larger scale during the Soviet period, especially during the 1940s and 1950s.

=== Tsar monastery ===
The monastery of Tsar, also called Tsara Surb Astvatsatsin (Armenian: Ծարա Սուրբ Աստվածածին), or Holy Mother of God Church (Armenian: Սուրբ Աստվածածին եկեղեցի, romanized: Surb Astvatsatsin Yekeghetsi), was an Armenian Apostolic monastery located at the edge of the village. It was built and consecrated in 1301 when the village was part of the Principality of Khachen, and included two 13th-century chapels and numerous khachkars. It was destroyed by Azeri authorities during the Soviet era. The monastery was blown up, two 13th-century chapels were razed. The elaborately engraved stones of the church were used to build storehouses, and are now visible in the foundations of barns built by the Azeris. Stones from the church were used to build a school in the village in the 1950s, with 133 carved or inscribed stone fragments reused within the walls of the school.

In 2024, Azerbaijan bulldozed the school buildings which contained many fragments from the monastery.

== Demographics ==
The village had 52 inhabitants in 2005, and 83 inhabitants in 2015.

== Gallery ==
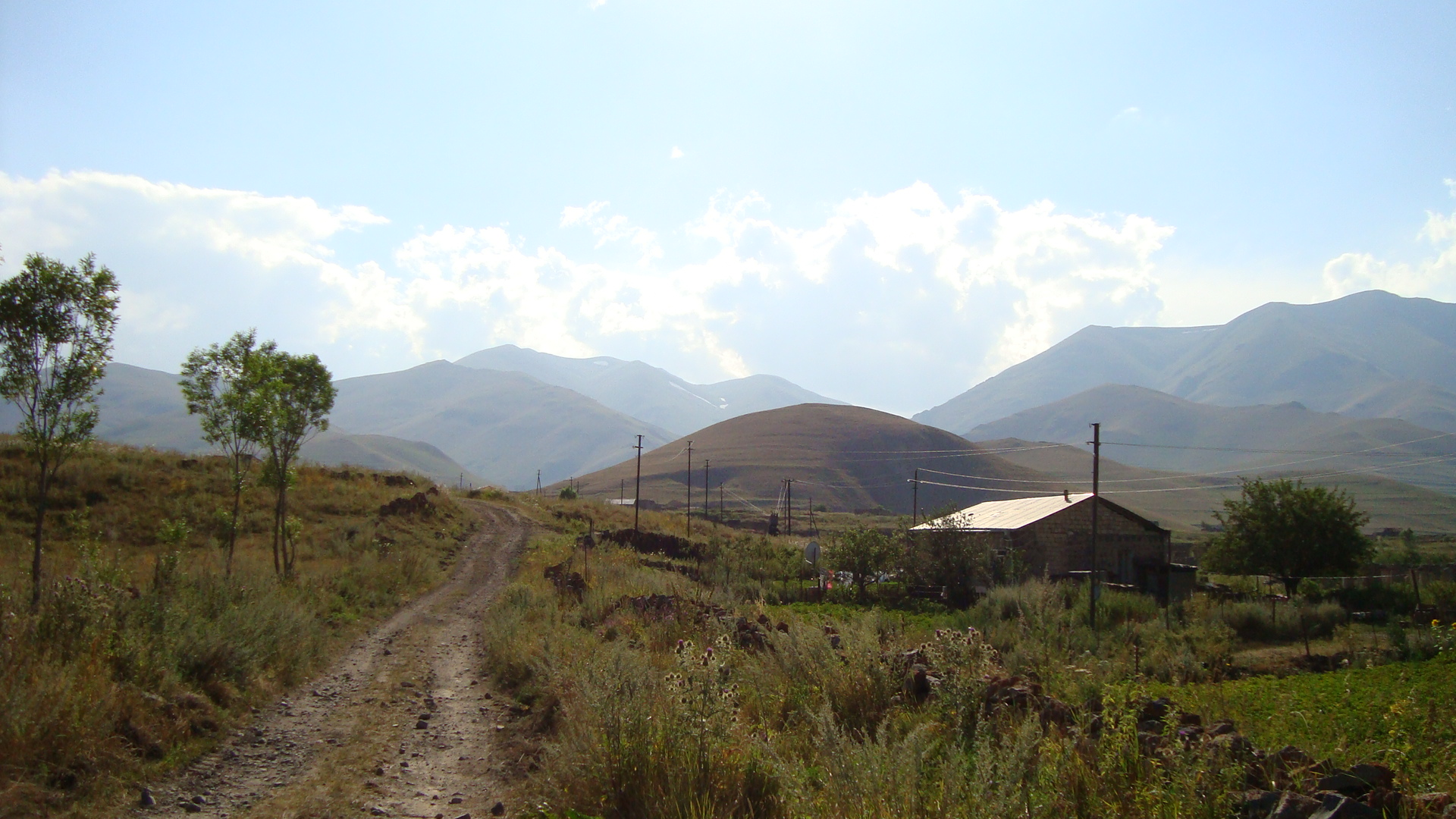
A view of the village

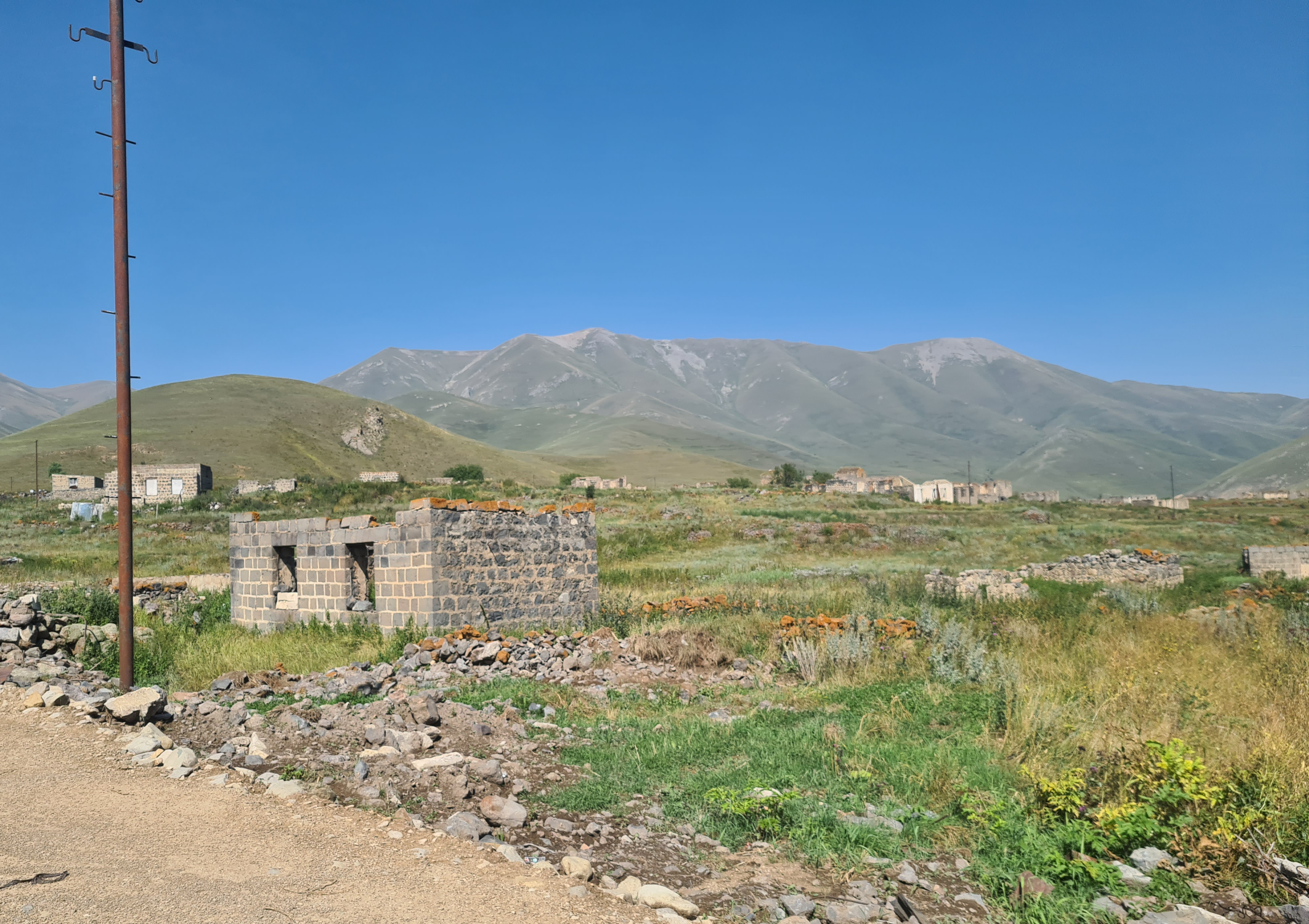
A view of the village

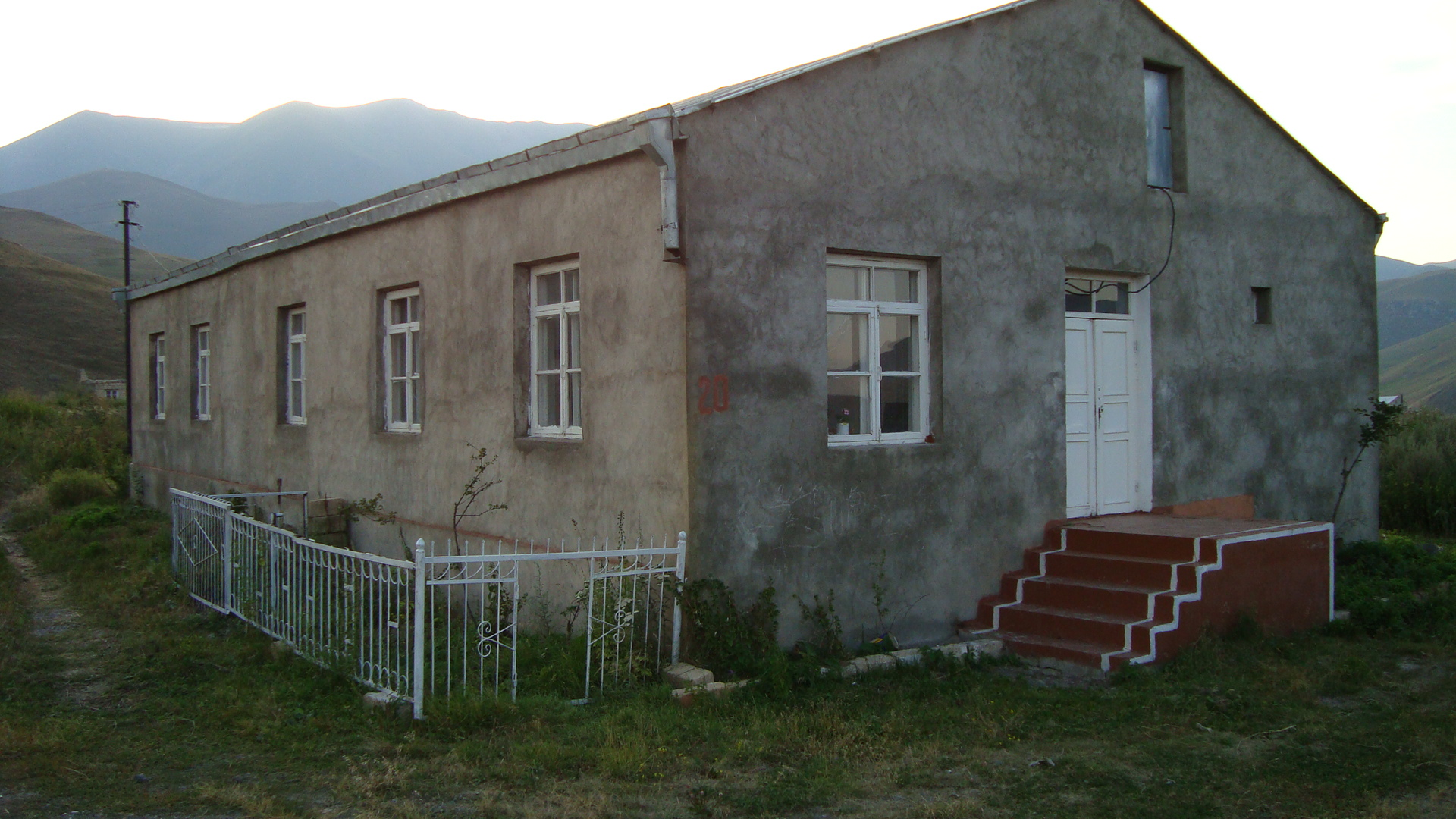
New village school

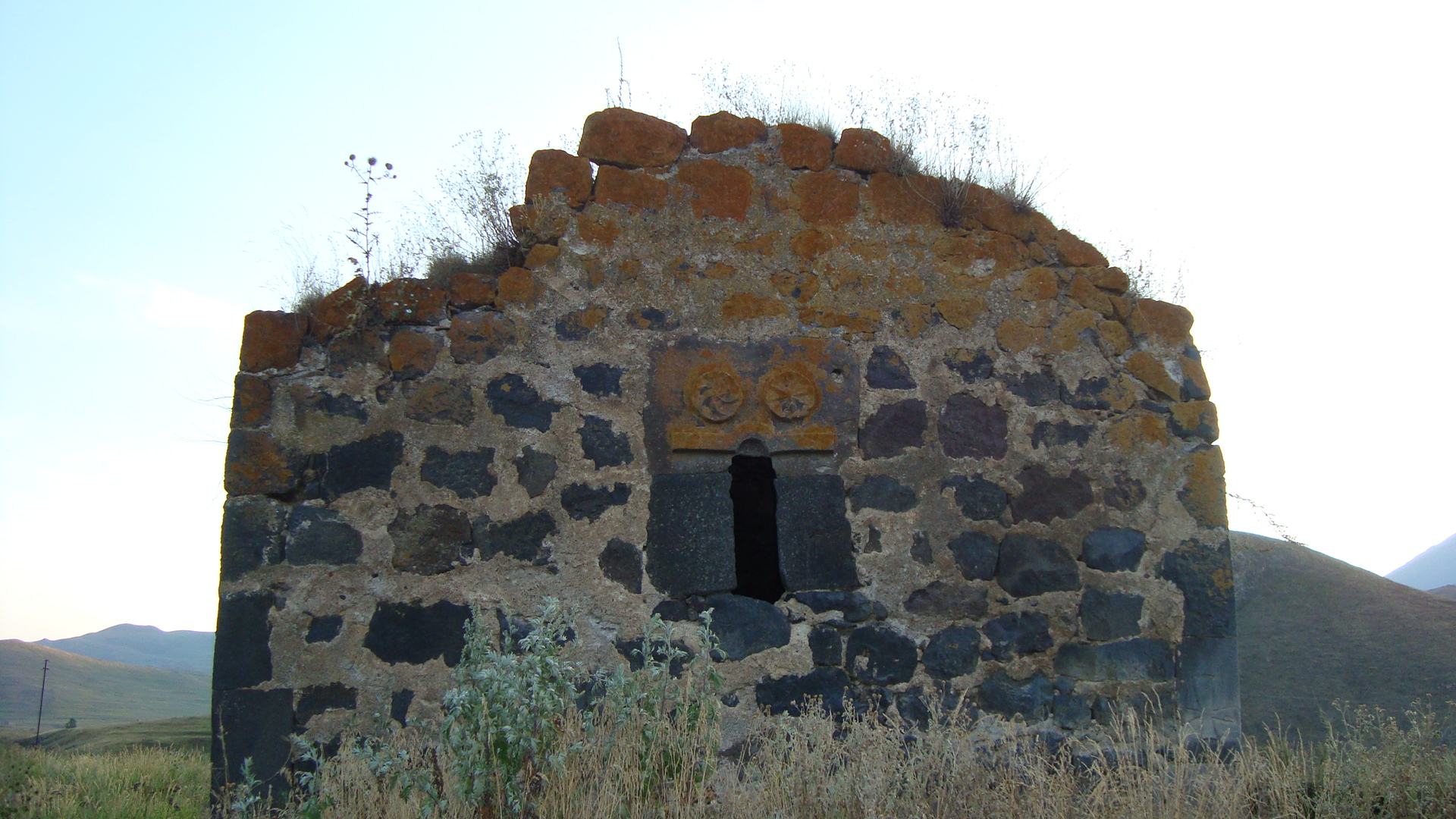
Wall of St. Sargis Church with ornaments

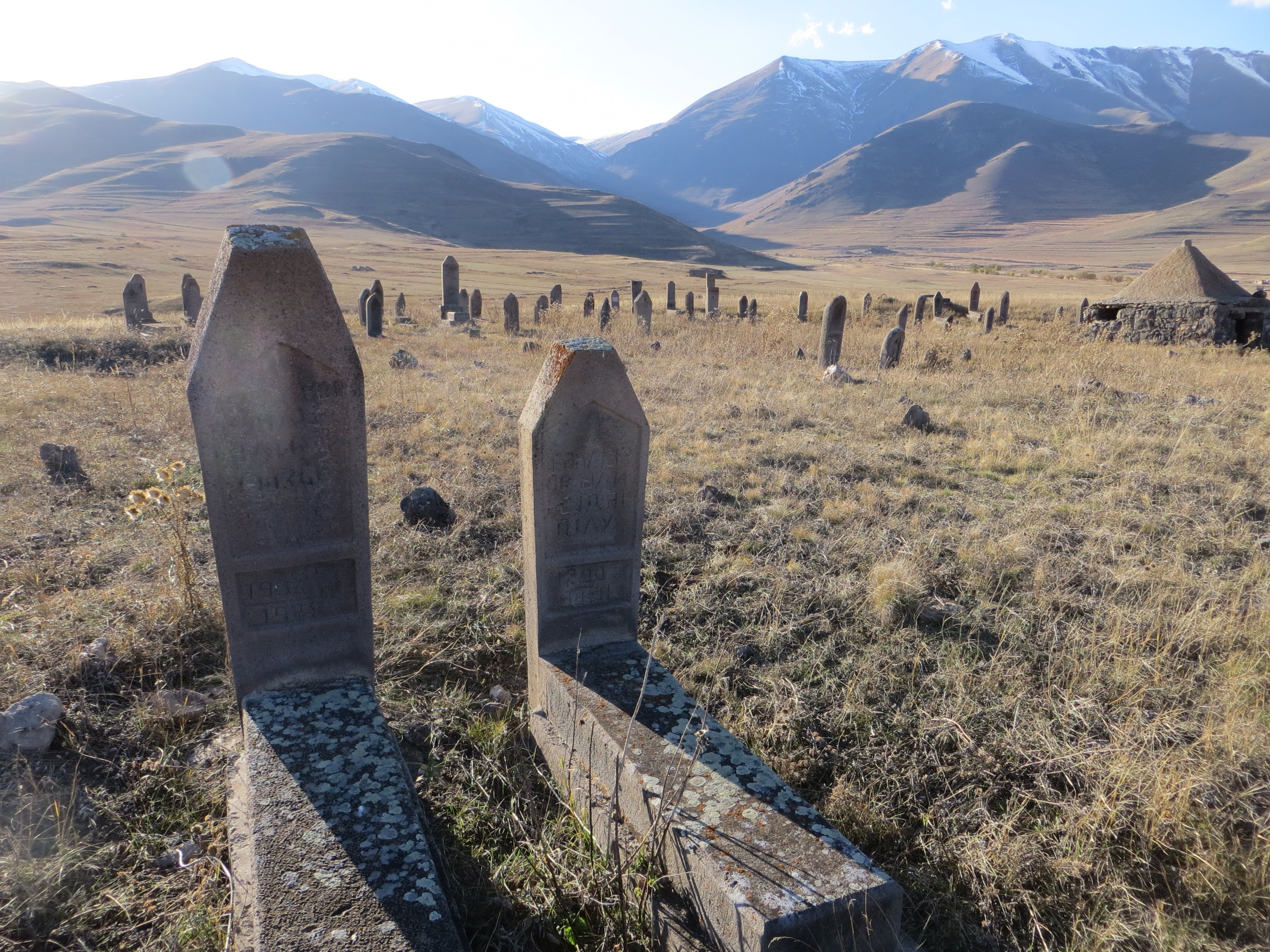
Azeri cemetery in the village, tombstones and mausoleum

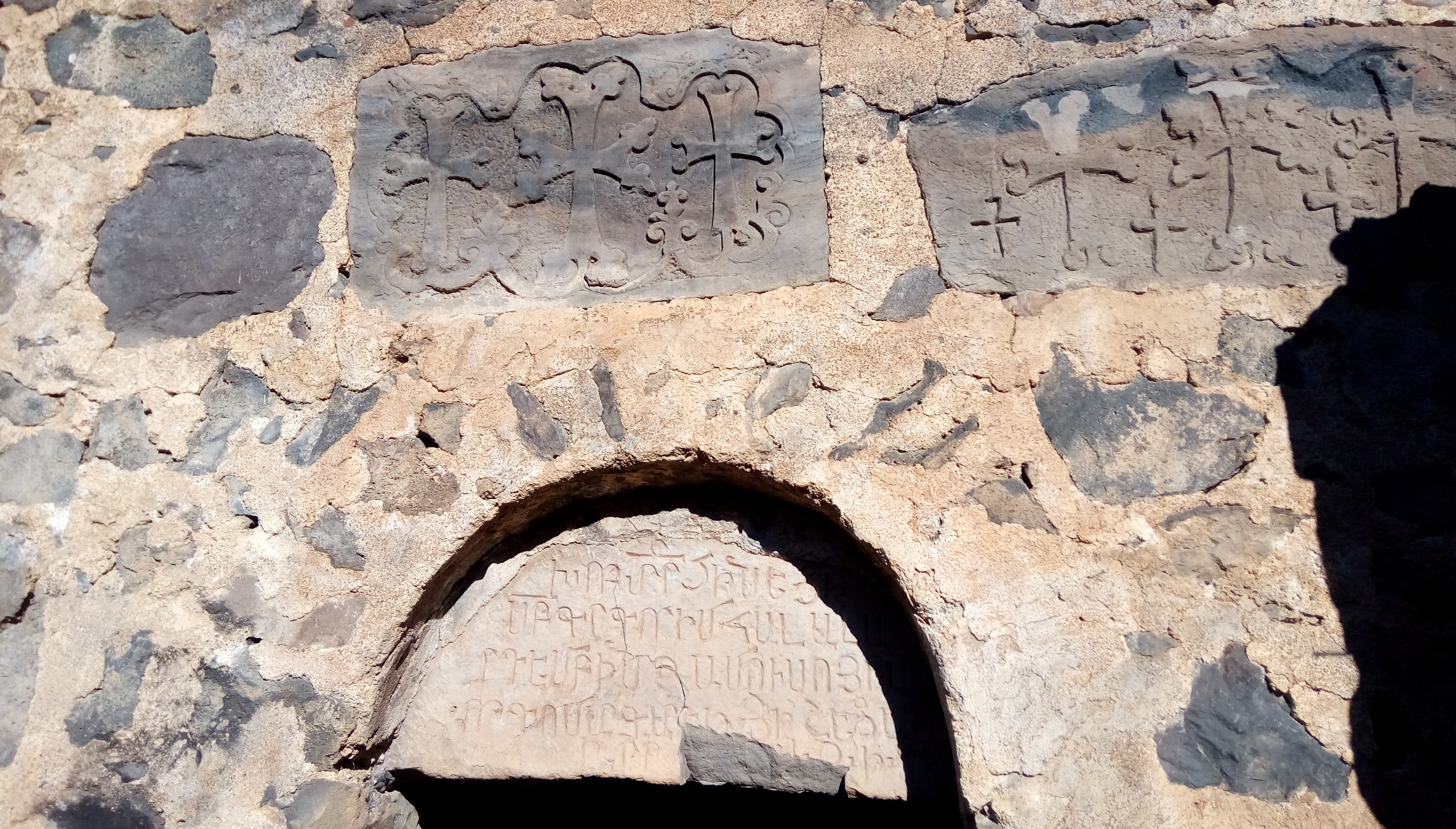
The 13th-century St. Gregory Church

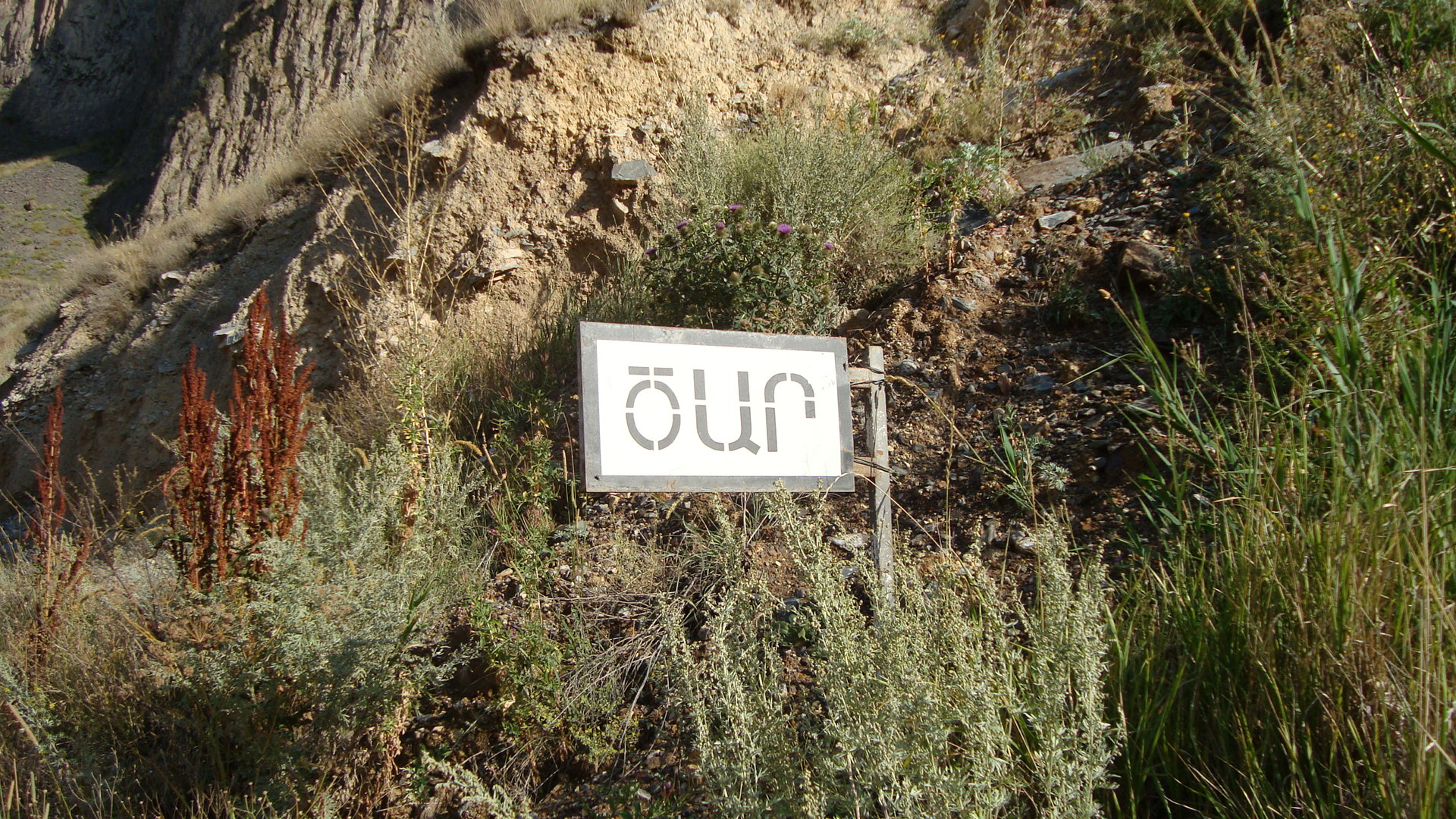
A sign in Armenian reading "Tsar" denoting the boundary limit of the village

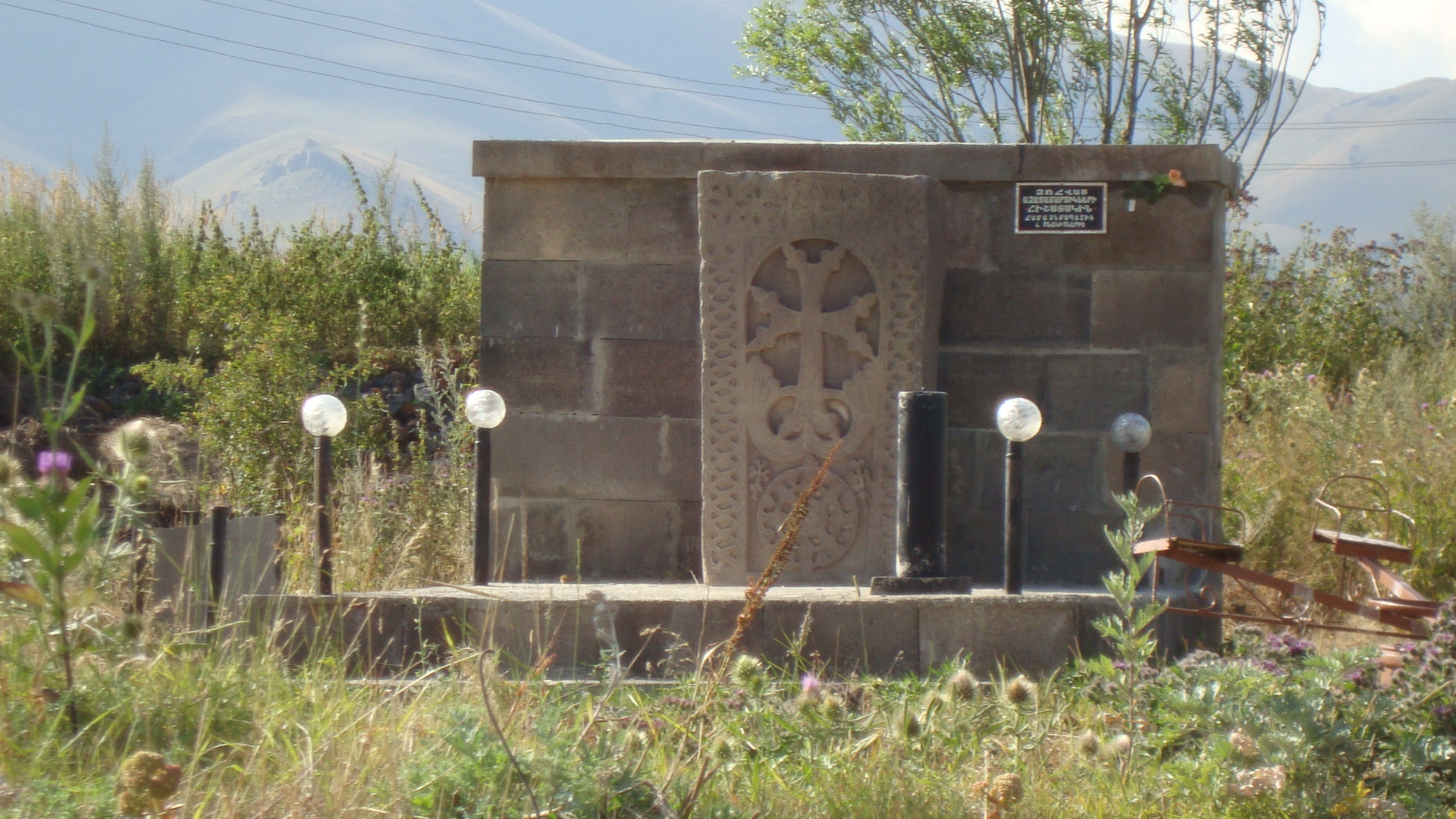
A monument built in honour of the Armenian troops who died in the First Nagorno-Karabakh War

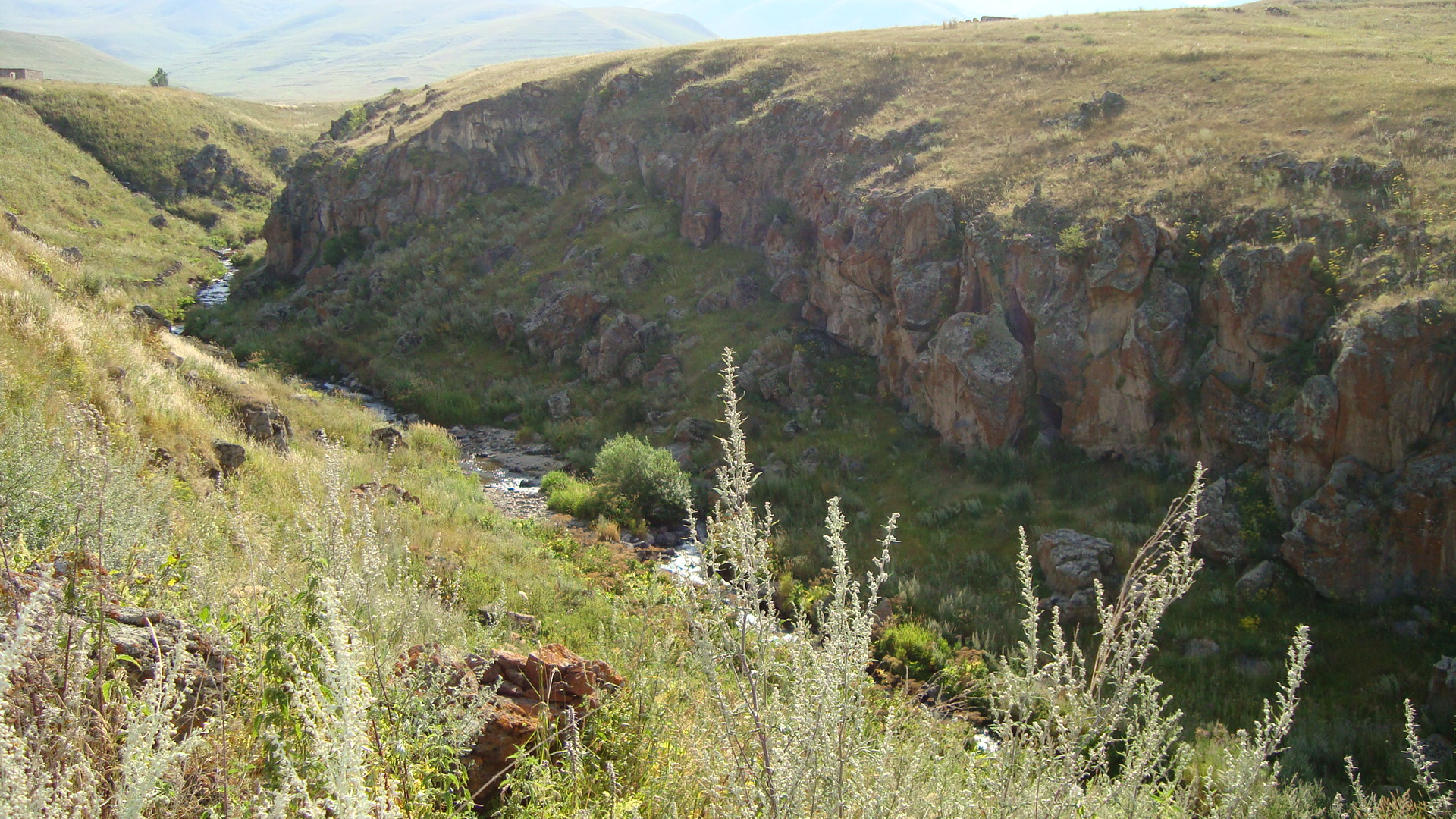
One of the canyons that surround the village

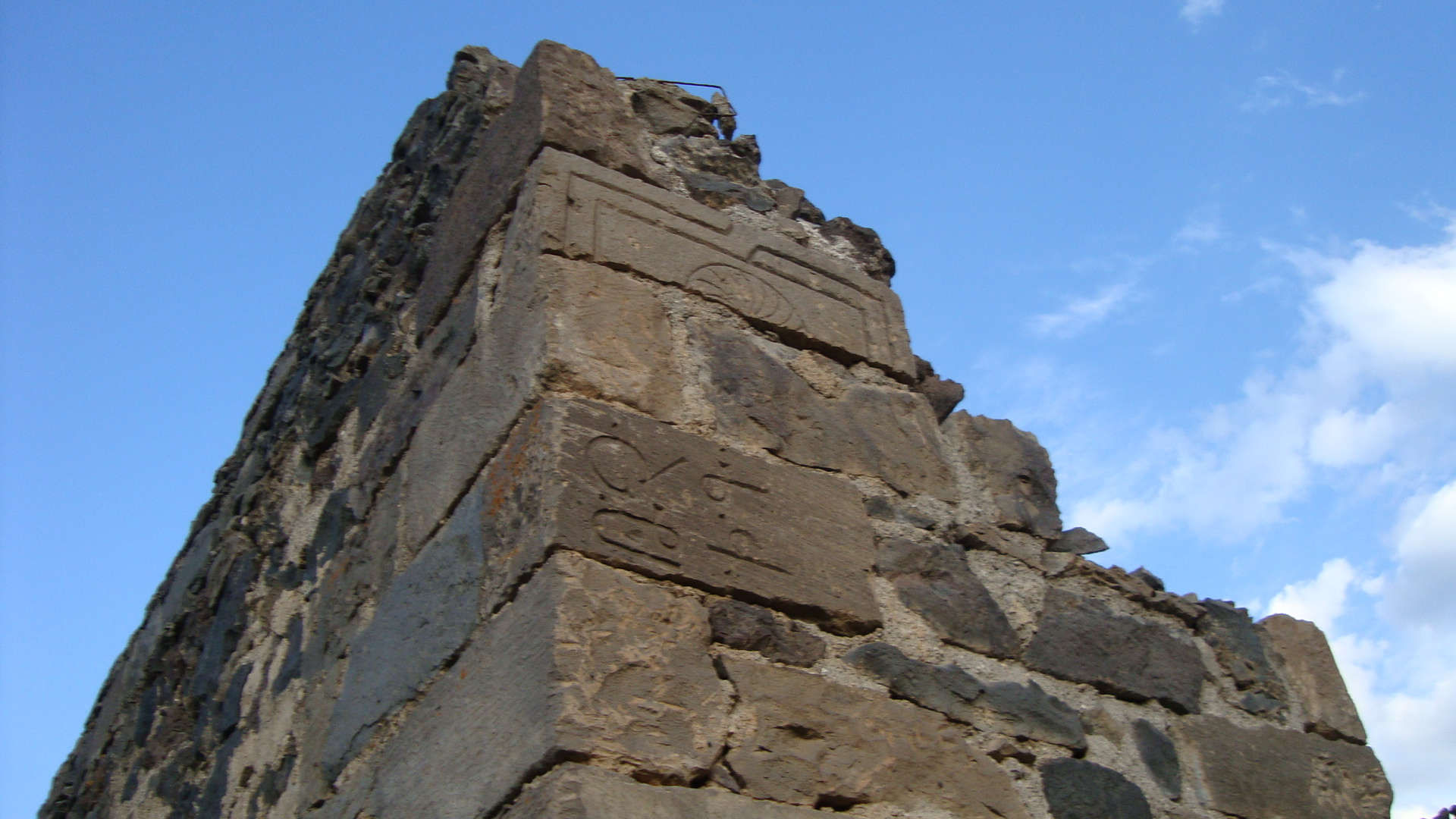
Ruins of the village school built in the 1950s and containing stones taken from an Armenian monastery

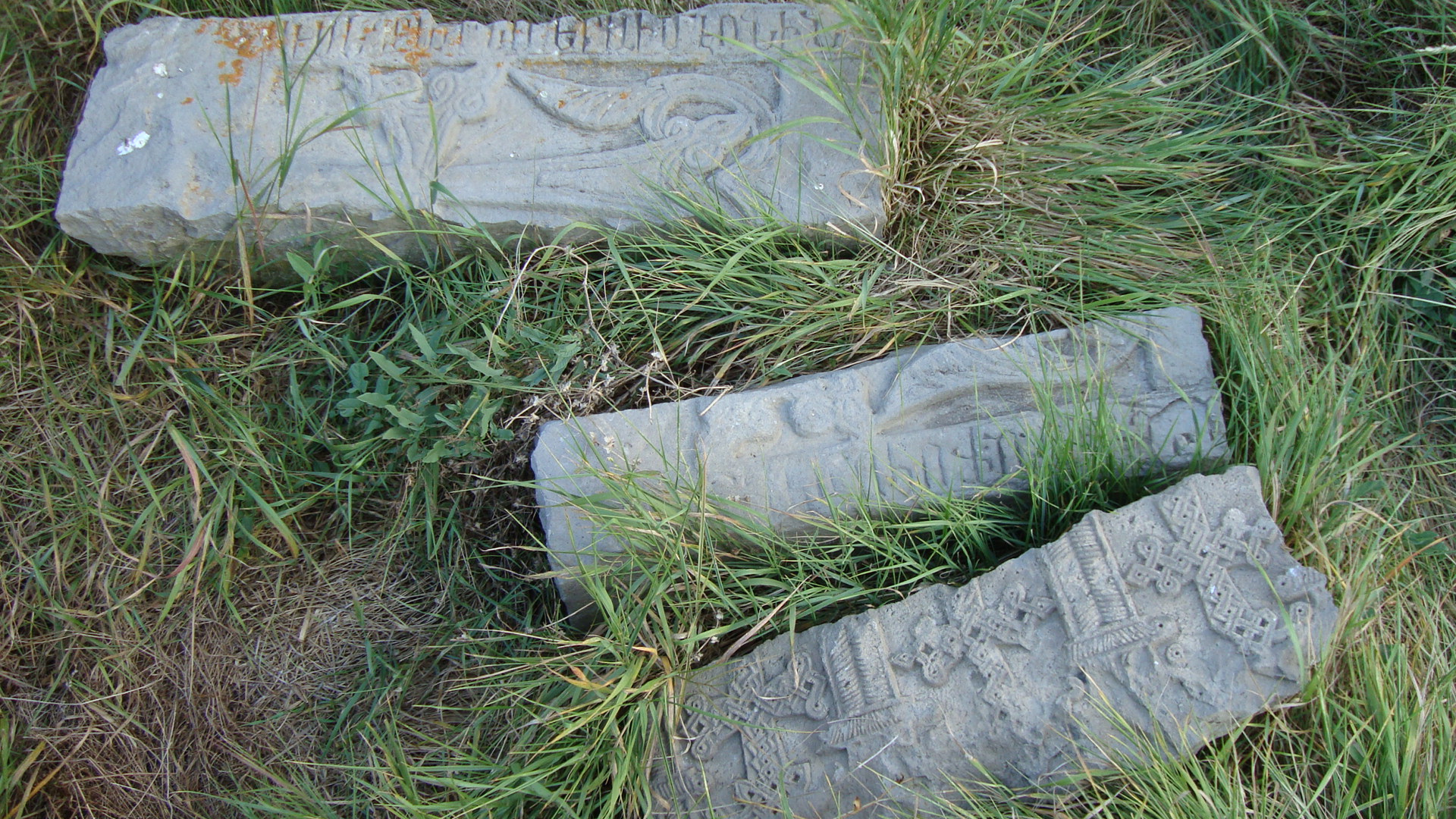
Fragments of Armenian gravestones

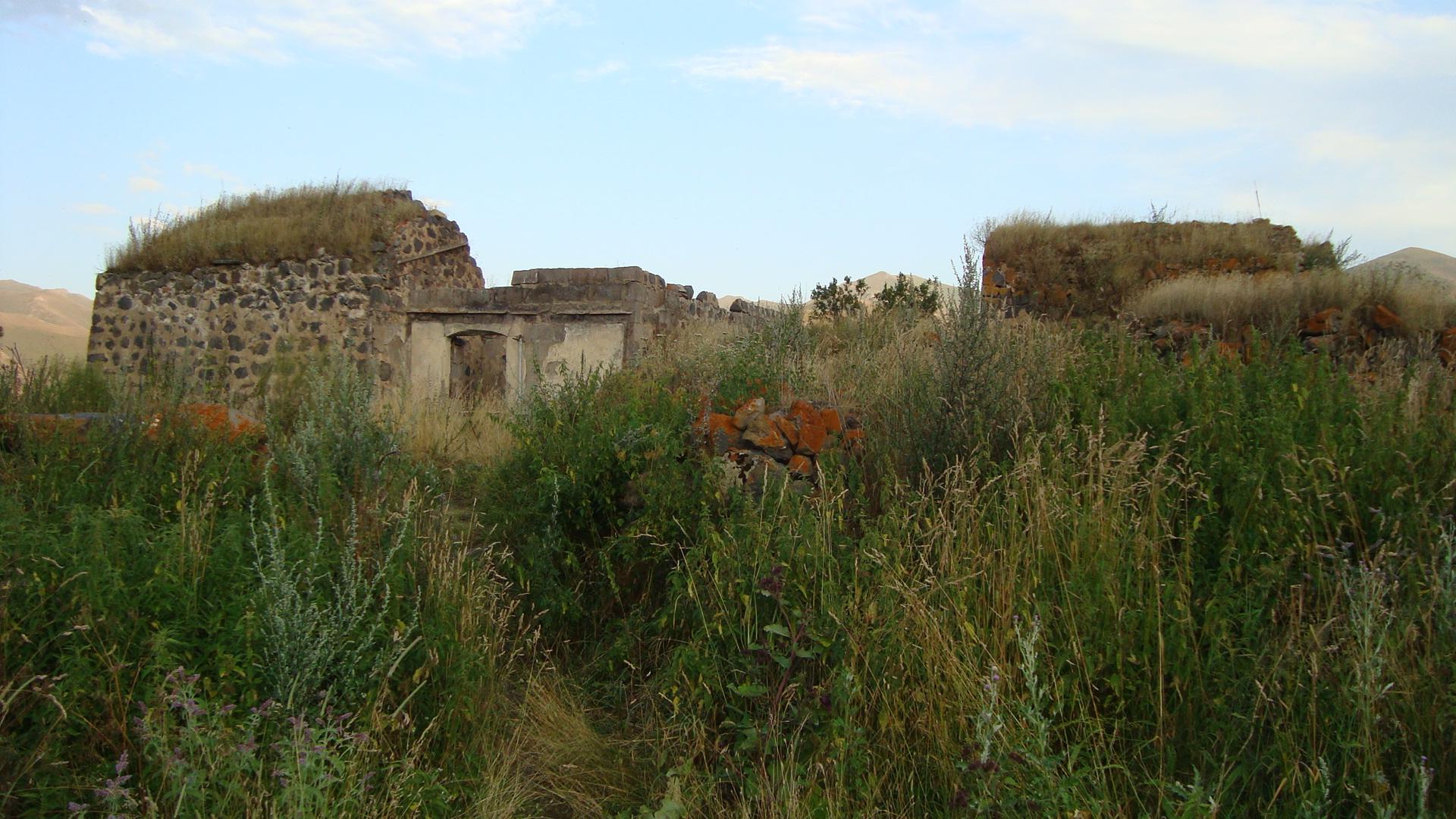
Ruins of Armenian churches

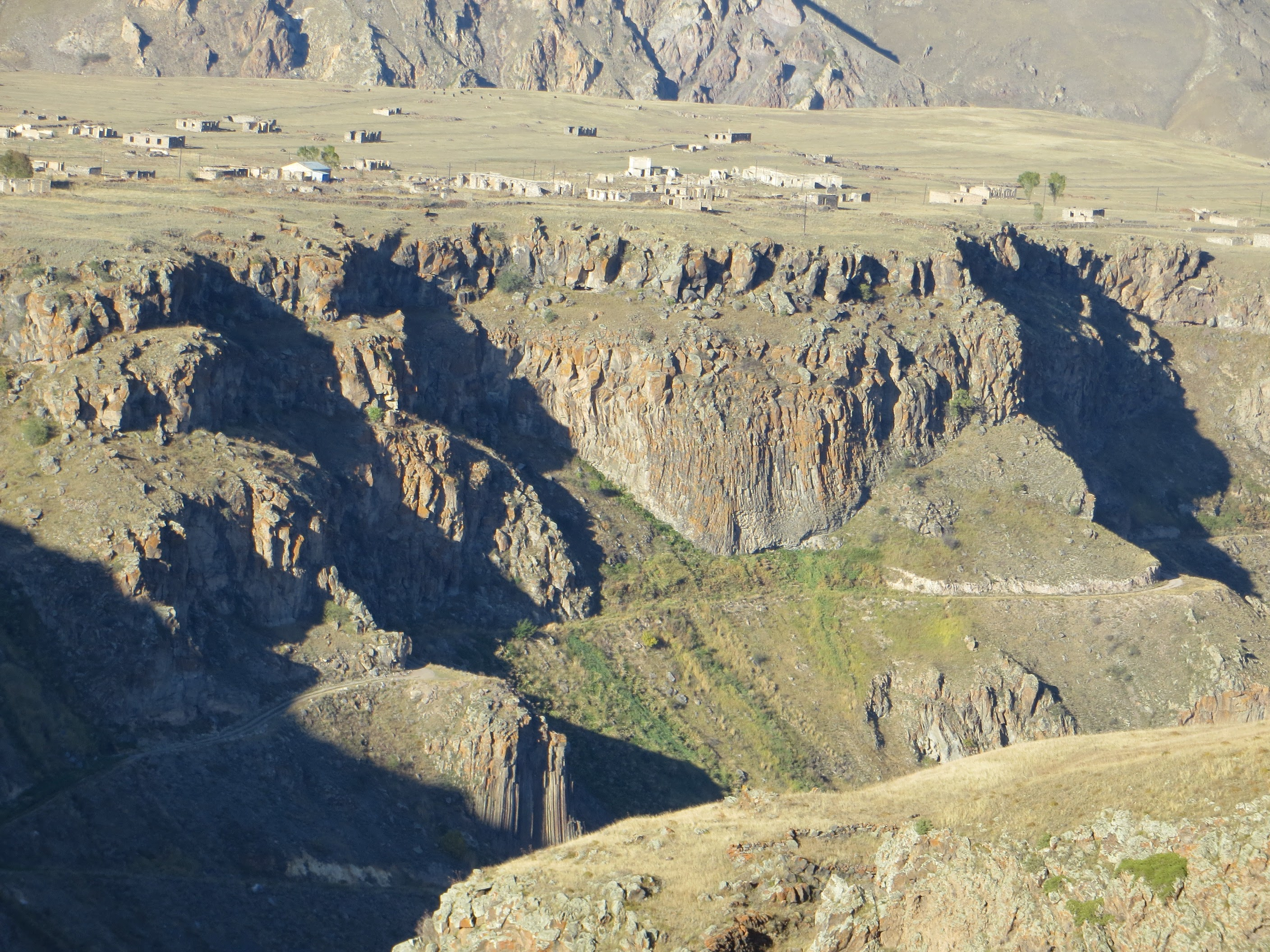
Scenery around the village

== See also ==
- Yovanisik Caretsi
