= Bombe (disambiguation) =

Bombe may refer to:

- Bombe, Wolaita, administrative town in Boloso Bombe Woreda of Wolyaita, Ethiopia
- Bombe, British electromechanical computer used to decode German Enigma messages in the Second World War
- Bombe glacée (a.k.a. "bombe"), ice cream dish resembling a cannonball
- Bombe Alaska, baked Alaska ice cream dish
- Bombe Gulf, Libya; a protected area in Libya

== See also ==
- Bomb (disambiguation)
- Bomba (disambiguation)
