= La Bomba =

La Bomba may refer to:

== Music ==
- "La Bomba" (Ricky Martin song), 1998
- "La Bomba" (Azul Azul song), 1998, also covered by King Africa in 2000
- "La Bomba", 1992 album by Lithuanian rock group Bix

== Books ==
- La Bomba, a book by José Antonio Gurriarán

== People ==
- Juan Carlos Navarro (basketball) or La Bomba (born 1980), Spanish basketball player
- Alberto Tomba or Tomba la Bomba (born 1966), Italian alpine skier

== See also ==
- Bomba (disambiguation)
- La Bamba (disambiguation)
