= Baamba =

Baamba may refer to:

- Baamba, the Amba people of Uganda and the Democratic Republic of the Congo
- "Baamba", the stage name of Stephen Albert (actor) of Australia
