= Bombed =

Bombed may refer to:

- something that is hit or exploded by a bomb
- the state of being drunk
- "Bombed," a song by Mark Lanegan from his 2004 album Bubblegum
- Bombed, an antagonist in the video game Super Smash Bros. Brawl
