= Zhar, Nyuksensky District, Vologda Oblast =

Zhar Жар
- Village
- Location within Vologda Oblast Location within Russia
- Coordinates: 60°14′N 44°23′E
- Country: Russia
- Region: Vologda Oblast
- District: Nyuksensky District
- Time zone: UTC+3:00

Zhar (Russian: Жар) is a rural locality (a village) in Gorodishchenskoye Rural Settlement, Nyuksensky District, Vologda Oblast, Russia. The population was 103 as of 2002.

== Geography ==
Zhar is located 39 km southeast of Nyuksenitsa (the district's administrative centre) by road. Gorodishchna is the nearest rural locality.
