= Les Edgerton =

American author (1943–2023)

Les Edgerton (1943-31 August 2023) was an American author of twenty-three books, including two about writing fiction: Finding Your Voice (Writer's Digest Books) and Hooked (Writer's Digest Books). Several of his books have been translated into Japanese, German and Italian. He also wrote short stories, articles, essays, novels, and screenplays.

== Awards and recognition ==
Edgerton's fiction has been nominated for the Pushcart Prize, O. Henry Award, Edgar Allan Poe Award (short story category), Jesse Jones Award, PEN/Faulkner Award, Derringer Award and the Violet Crown Book Award. One of his screenplays was a semifinalist for the Don and Gee Nicholl Fellowships in Screenwriting Program, a finalist in the Austin Film Festival Heart of Film Screenplay Competition, and a finalist in the Writer's Guild's "Best American Screenplays" Competition. His short fiction has appeared in Houghton Mifflin's Best American Mysteries of 2001, The South Carolina Review, Kansas Quarterly, Arkansas Review, North Atlantic Review, Chiron Review, and many others.

== Works ==
- Hooked: Write Fiction That Grabs Readers at Page One and Never Lets Them Go, Writer's Digest Books, 2007, ISBN 978-1-58297-514-6
- Finding Your Voice: How to Put Personality into Your Writing, Writer's Digest Books, 2003, ISBN 978-1-58297-173-5
- Surviving Little League: For Players, Parents, and Coaches, Taylor Trade Publishing, 2004, ISBN 978-1-58979-067-4
- Monday's Meal: Stories, University of North Texas Press, 1997, ISBN 978-1-57441-026-6
- The Death of Tarpons, The University of North Texas Press, 1996, ISBN 978-1-57441-011-2
- Perfect Game USA, McFarland Publishing, 2008.
- The Perfect Crime, StoneGate Ink, 2011
- Just Like That, StoneGate Ink, 2011
- Gumbo Ya-Ya, Story Collection, Snubnose Press, 2011
- The Bitch, Bare Knuckles Press, 2011
- Mirror, Mirror, YA, StoneGate Ink, 2012
- Three books on business/hairstyling from Thomson Publishing.
- The Rapist, New Pulp Press, 2013.
