= BOM (file format) =

Computer file format for the macOS installer

BOM is a computer file format used by the Mac OS X installer. BOM stands for "bill of materials" and is used to determine which files to install, remove, or upgrade. A bill of materials, "BOM", contains all the files within a directory, along with some information about each file. File information includes: the file's Unix file permissions, its owner and group, its size, its time of last modification, and so on. Also included are a checksum of each file and information about hard links.

Bill of materials (BOM) files are also used in printed circuit board (PCB) designing, where they contain a list of components to be put on the PCB.
