= Zhar, Syamzhensky District, Vologda Oblast =

Zhar Жар
- Village
- Location within Vologda Oblast Location within Russia
- Coordinates: 59°56′N 41°13′E
- Country: Russia
- Region: Vologda Oblast
- District: Syamzhensky District
- Time zone: UTC+3:00

Zhar (Russian: Жар) is a rural locality (a village) in Zhityovskoye Rural Settlement, Syamzhensky District, Vologda Oblast, Russia. The population was 17 as of 2002.

== Geography ==
Zhar is located 28 km southeast of Syamzha (the district's administrative centre) by road. Staraya is the nearest rural locality.
