= Zharov =

Zharov (Russian: Жаров) is a Russian male surname, its feminine counterpart is Zharova. The surname originated from the word zhar, which means heat and referred to the red hair color. Famous people with this last name are:

- Aleksandr Zharov (born 1964), Russian politician
- Innokenty Zharov (born 1968), Russian Olympic runner
- Mikhail Zharov (1899–1981), Russian actor
- Vladimir Zharov (born 1949), Russian Olympic rower
