= Bomba Jawara =

Sierra Leonean politician

Alhaji Bomba Jawara is a Sierra Leonean politician from the Sierra Leone People's Party (SLPP), and in 2004/05 he was a member of parliament representing Koinadugu District.
