= Bureau of Mines (Taiwan) =

Government agency of Taiwan

Coordinates: 25°02′40.6″N 121°31′15.9″E

- 經濟部礦務局
- Logo

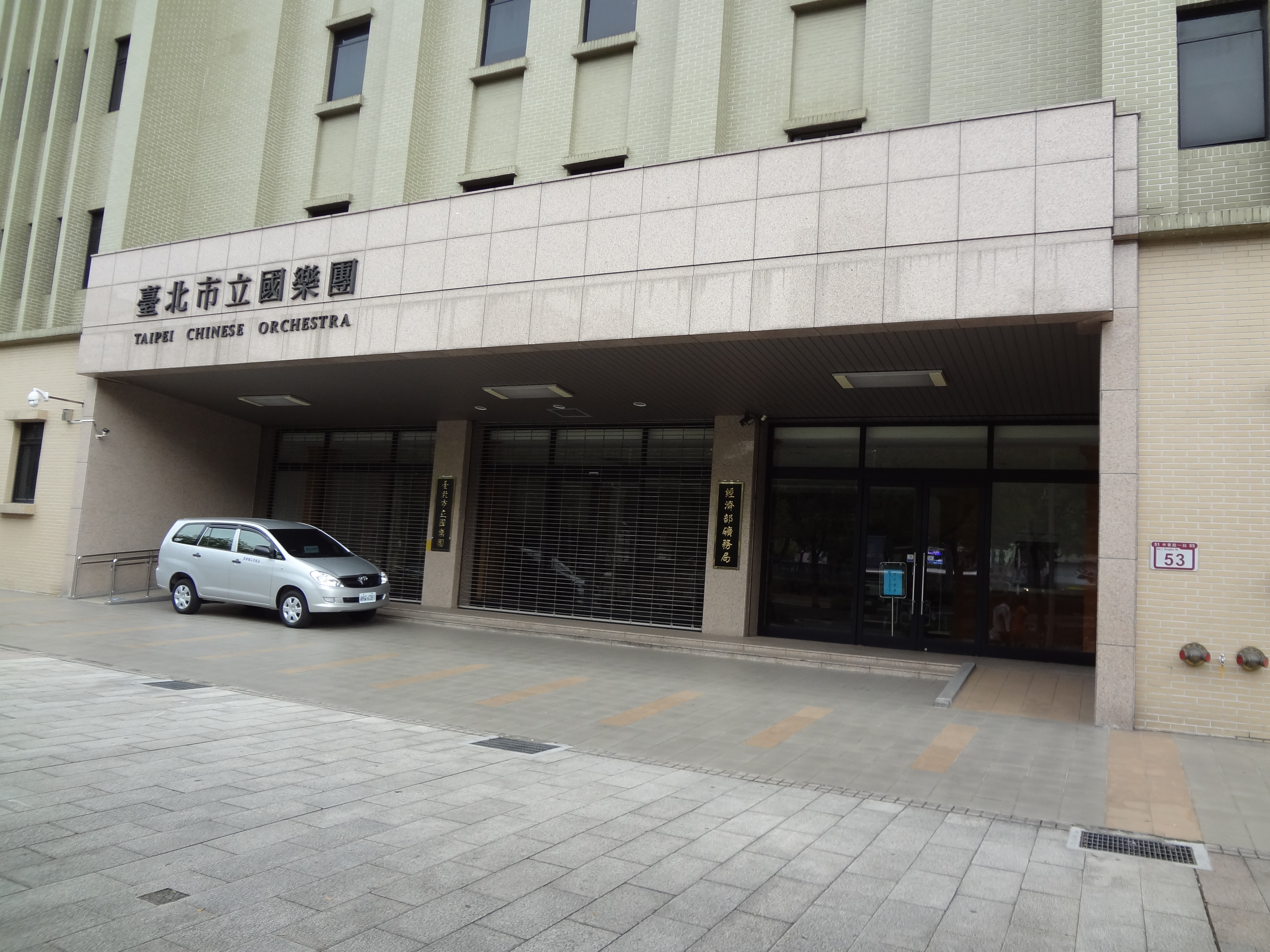

Agency overview
- Formed: 11 February 1970 (as Taiwan Provincial Bureau of Mines); 1 July 1999 (as BOM)
- Jurisdiction: Taiwan (ROC)
- Headquarters: Zhongzheng, Taipei
- Agency executive: Hsu Ching-wen, Director
- Parent agency: Ministry of Economic Affairs
- Website: www.mine.gov.tw/en/

The Bureau of Mines (BOM; Chinese: 經濟部礦務局; pinyin: Jīngjì Bù Kuàng Wù Jú) is the government agency of the Ministry of Economic Affairs of the Republic of China (Taiwan).

== History ==
On 11 February 1970, the Taiwan Provincial Government merged the Coal Industry Regulatory Committee, Second Section of Reconstruction Department governing mine safety and Second Division of Industry and Mine Inspection Committee overseeing inspection of mine safety into Taiwan Provincial Bureau of Mines. On 1 July 1999, it was put under the Ministry of Economic Affairs as Bureau of Mines.

== Organizational structures ==
- Mine administration
- Mine safety
- Mine assistance
- Soil and rock divisions
- Eastern district office
- Secretary
- Accounting
- Personnel and civil service ethics offices

== Transportation ==
The headquarter office is accessible within walking distance west of Shandao Temple Station of Taipei Metro.

== Directors ==
- Chu Ming-chao (朱明昭) (- 13 June 2017)
- Hsu Ching-wen (徐景文) (13 June 2017 -)

== See also ==
- Ministry of Economic Affairs (Taiwan)
- Mining in Taiwan
