= Commune of Musigati =

Coordinates: 3°04′S 29°026′E

- Commune
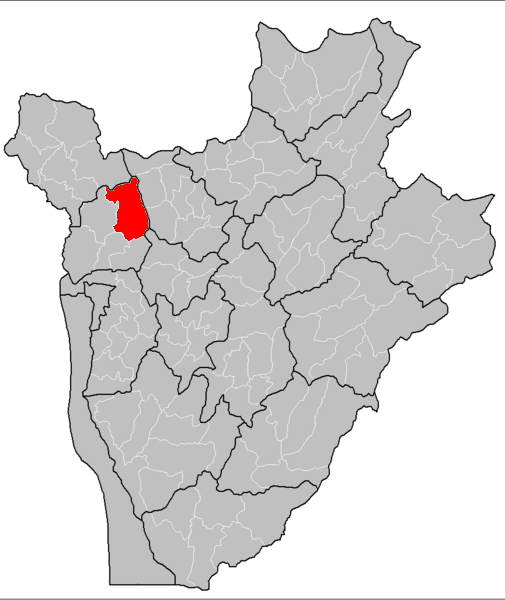
- Commune of Musigati in Burundi
- Country: Burundi
- Province: Bubanza Province
- Administrative center: Musigati
- Time zone: UTC+2 (Central Africa Time)

Musigati is a commune of Bubanza Province in north-western Burundi. The capital lies at Musigati city.
