= Commune of Rugazi =

Coordinates: 3°011′S 29°030′E

- Commune
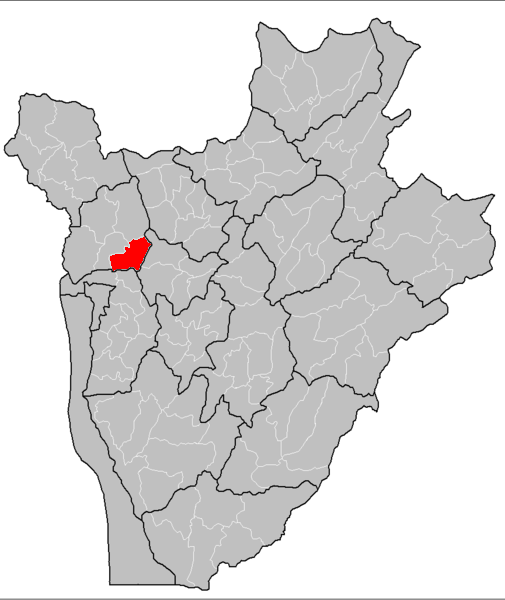
- Commune of Rugazi in Burundi
- Country: Burundi
- Province: Bubanza Province
- Time zone: UTC+2 (Central Africa Time)

Rugazi is a commune of Bubanza Province in north-western Burundi.
