= Bubanza Province =

Former province of Burundi

Coordinates: 3°9′5″S 29°22′28″E

- Province
- Country: Burundi
- Capital: Bubanza

Area
  - Total: 1,089.04 km^{2} (420.48 sq mi)

Population (2008 census)
  - Total: 338,023
  - Density: 310.386/km^{2} (803.897/sq mi)

Bubanza was one of the provinces of Burundi. In 2025, it was merged into the new Bujumbura Province.

== Location ==
Bubanza was in the north-west of Burundi, bordering the Democratic Republic of the Congo to the east. Cibitoke Province was to the north, Kayanza Province and Muramvya Province to the west and Bujumbura Rural Province to the south. The west of the province was in the Imbo natural region, the center in the Mumirwa natural region and parts of the east in the Mugamba natural region.

== Communes ==
Bubanza was divided administratively into 5 communes:

- Commune of Bubanza (Bubanza)
- Commune of Gihanga (Gihanga)
- Commune of Musigati (Musigati)
- Commune of Mpanda (Mpanda)
- Commune of Rugazi (Rugazi)

== Sources ==
- Atlas des quatre sites Ramsar: Localisation et Resources (PDF) (in French), Ministry of Water, Environment and Urbanism, October 2014
