= Religion in Artsakh =

Religious beliefs in Artsakh

Religion in Artsakh (2015)
1. Armenian Apostolic (98.0%)
2. Evangelical (0.37%)
3. Jehovah's Witnesses (0.23%)
4. Russian Orthodox (0.15%)
5. Other (0.14%)
6. Islam (0.43%)
7. Spiritual but not religious (0.41%)
8. Undecided (0.24%)

Religion in Artsakh was characterized by a largely homogeneous Christian population (99%) who overwhelmingly belonged to the Armenian Apostolic Church (98%).

== History ==
=== Arab and Safavid rule ===
Islam arrived in Nagorno-Karabakh with Arabs in the seventh century, gradually increasing as Islamic nations ruled the region.

In the sixteenth century, the first shah of the Safavid dynasty, Ismail I (r. 1486–1524) established Shia Islam as the state religion. The Safavid dynasty would have a strict policy of enforcing Shia Islam, which would bring political conflict with the Sunnis of the neighbouring Ottoman Empire.

=== Russian & Soviet rule ===
In 1806, Nagorno-Karabakh was annexed by the Russian Empire from the Persian Qajar dynasty, and Emperor Paul I of Russia issued a charter titled "About their admission to Russian suzerainty, land allocation, rights and privileges", it was noted that the Christian heritage of the Karabakh region and all their people were admitted to the Russian suzerainty.

In 1918, the First Republic of Armenia and Azerbaijan Democratic Republic (1918–20) declared independence from Russia during the Russian Civil war, but were both promptly incorporated into the Soviet Union in 1920. During the Soviet era, state atheism was enforced, which resulted in all of Nagorno-Karabakh's Churches and Mosques being closed.

== Religious places ==
=== Churches ===
There are hundreds of churches scattered throughout Artsakh, because the vast majority of the population belongs to the Armenian Apostolic Church. Some notable ones include:

- Ghazanchetsots Cathedral, Shushi
- Holy Mother of God Cathedral, Stepanakert
- Kanach Zham, Shushi
- Saint John the Baptist Church, Martakert
- Church of St. Nerses the Great, Martuni
- Vankasar Church, Askeran Province

==== Monasteries ====
- Amaras Monastery, near Sos
- Dadivank, Vang, Kalbajar
- Gandzasar monastery, Vank, Martakert
- Gtichavank, Tugh
- Hakobavank, Kolatak
- Katarovank, Hin Tagher
- Tsar monastery, Zar
- Tsitsernavank, Hüsülü, Lachin
- Yeghishe Arakyal Monastery, Madagiz
- Yerits Mankants Monastery, near Maghavuz

=== Mosques ===
The vast majority of mosques in Artsakh are in Shusha, which was majority-Muslim between the Shusha massacre and the First Nagorno-Karabakh War. One major exception to this is Agdam Mosque, a 19th-century mosque in the ghost town of Aghdam.

== See also ==
- Religion in Armenia
