= Kachaghakaberd =

Fortress in Nagorno-Karabakh

- Armenian: Կաչաղակաբերդ; Azerbaijani: Qaxaç qalası
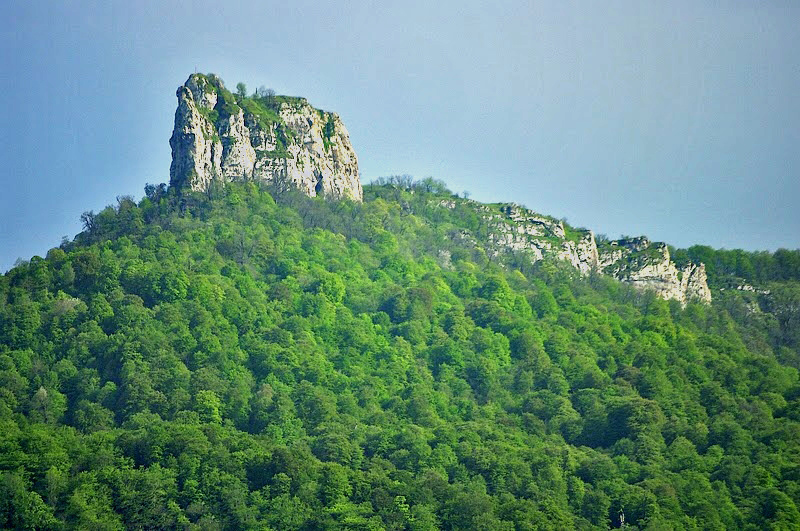
- Interactive map of Kachaghakaberd
- Location: between the villages of Kolatak and Khndzristan in Khojaly District of Azerbaijan
- Coordinates: 39°58′17.0″N 46°36′53.5″E
- Type: Fortress
- Completion date: 9th century

Kachaghakaberd (Armenian: Կաչաղակաբերդ, Azerbaijani: Qaxaç qalası) is a mountain-top fortress located between the villages of Kolatak and Khndzristan, in Khojaly District of Azerbaijan.

The Janapar Trail runs very near to the fortress. A short side trail takes to the top of the fortress.

== Etymology ==
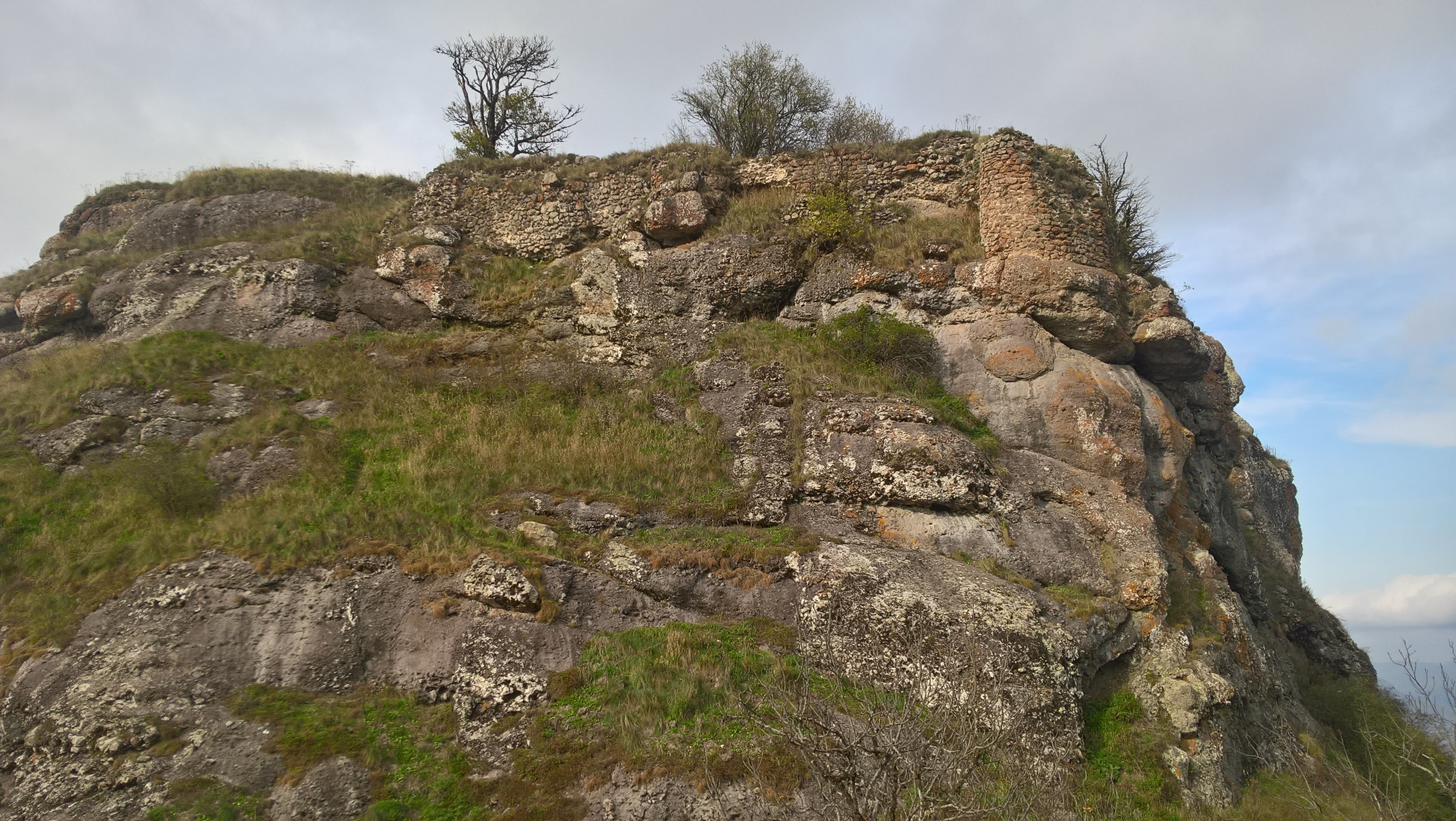
Kachaghakaberd fortress

Kachaghakaberd is translated from Armenian as magpie's fortress, a combination of the words կաչաղաք (kachaghak, designating the bird magpie) and բերդ (berd, meaning fortress).

== Architecture ==
The fortress was an important fortification of the medieval Armenian Principality of Khachen that thrived in the High Middle Ages, and is located at a height of more than 1700 meters, surrounded by vertical limestone cliffs with the heights of 50–60 meters, has a hard-to-reach entrance from the southern side of the fortress. During its history no one could ever storm the fortress. Parts of the defensive walls remain standing.

The territory of the fortress occupies a large area, though it seems small. Many rooms, secret passages cut into the cliffs, and special loopholes for throwing stones at enemies are inside its territory. The water supply problem was solved by a unique method: two rock-cut reservoirs to store rain and melt-water are in the center of the fortress. Fresh water was brought from a spring at the foot of the mountain.

== Gallery ==
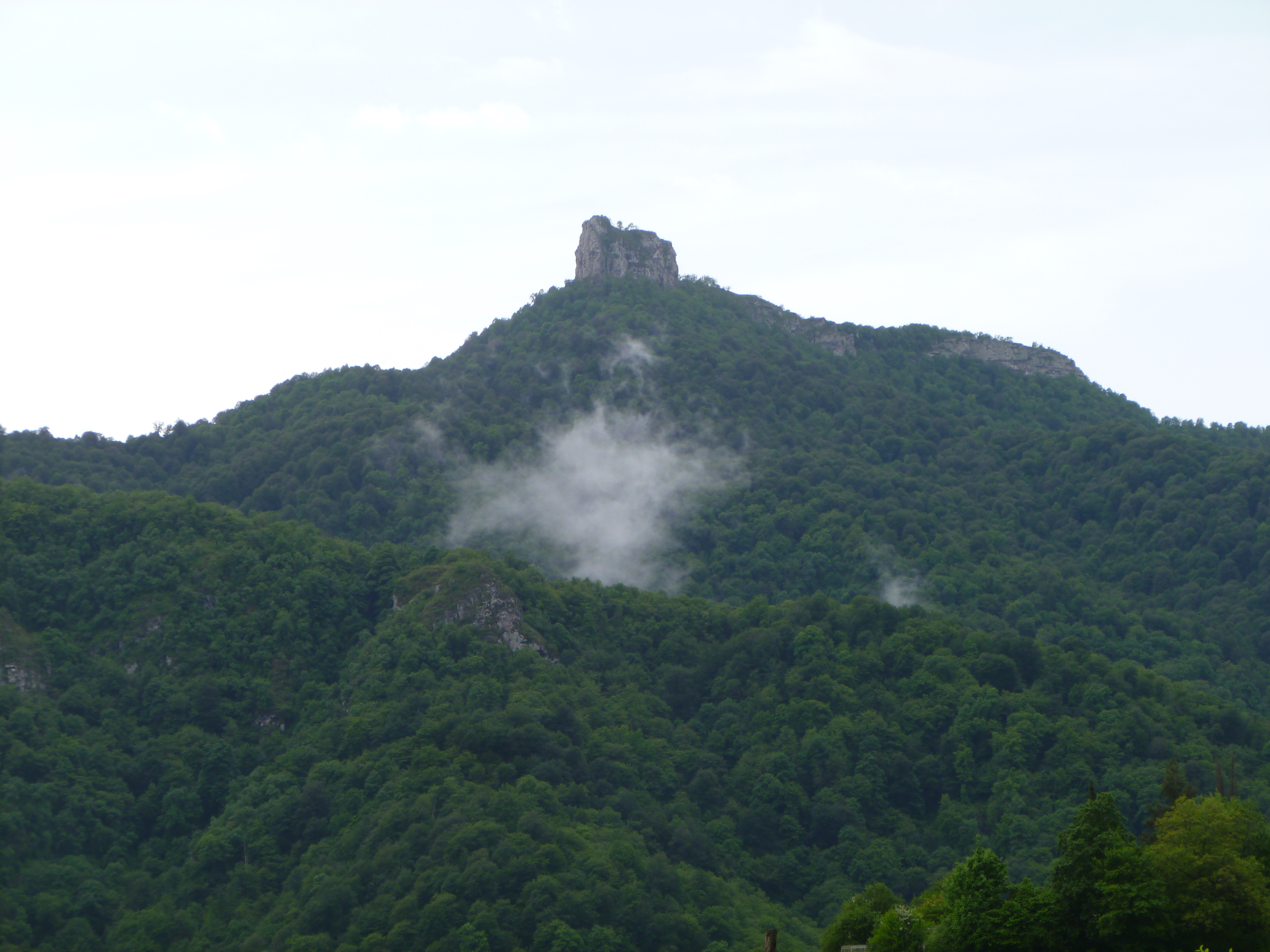
View of the tower

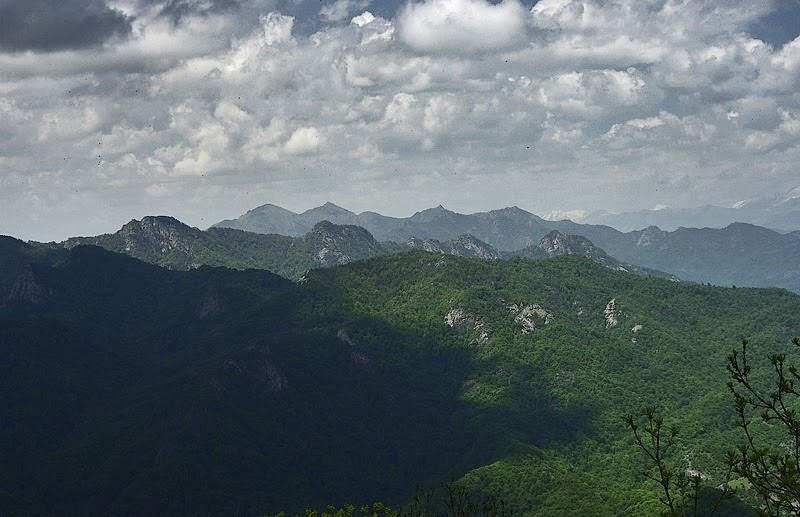
View from the tower

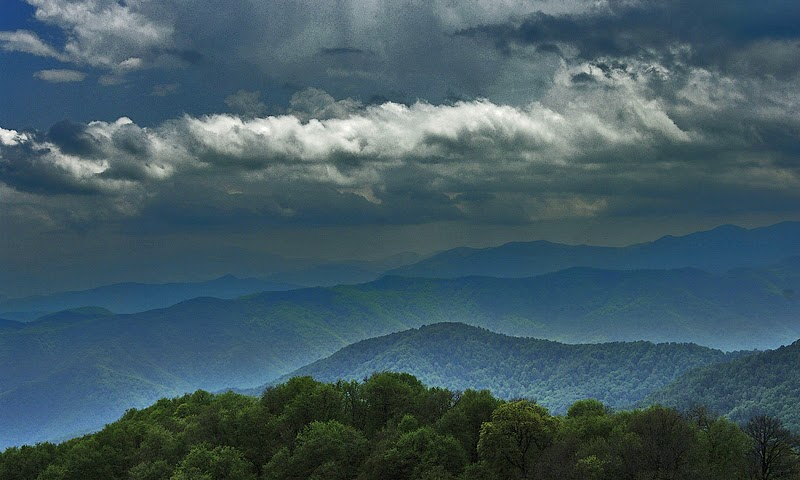

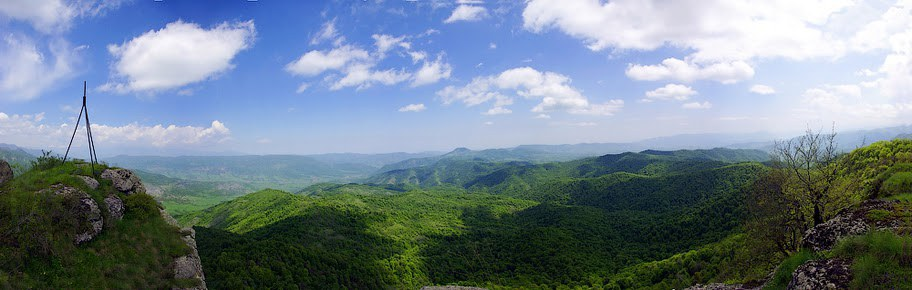

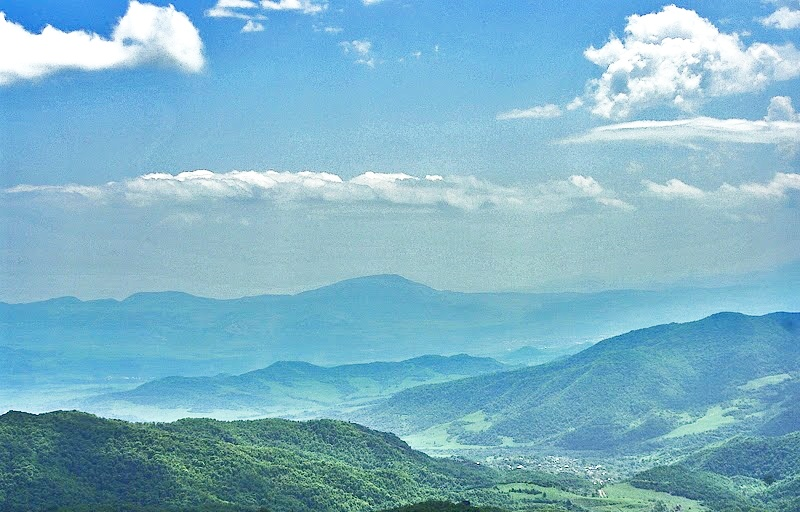
View of Kolatak village from the tower

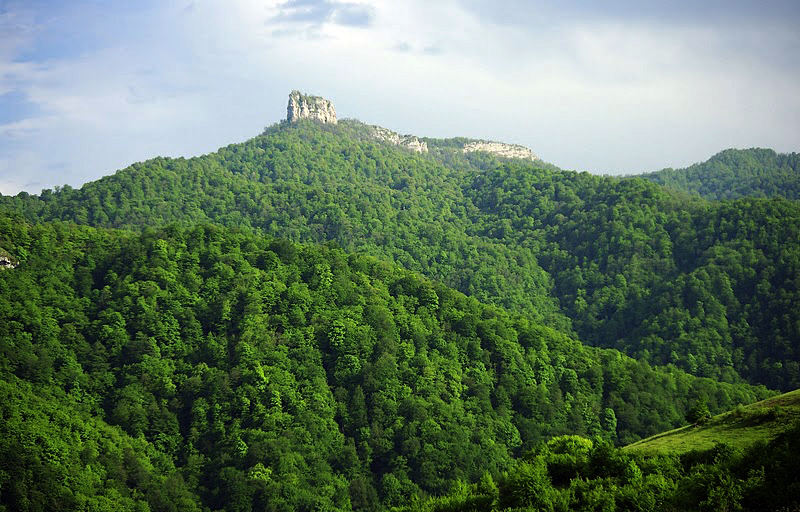

== See also ==
- Culture of Azerbaijan
- Culture of Artsakh
- Principality of Khachen
- Kingdom of Artsakh
