= Dashalty =

Village in Shusha, Azerbaijan

Dashalty / Karin Tak Daşaltı / Քարին Տակ
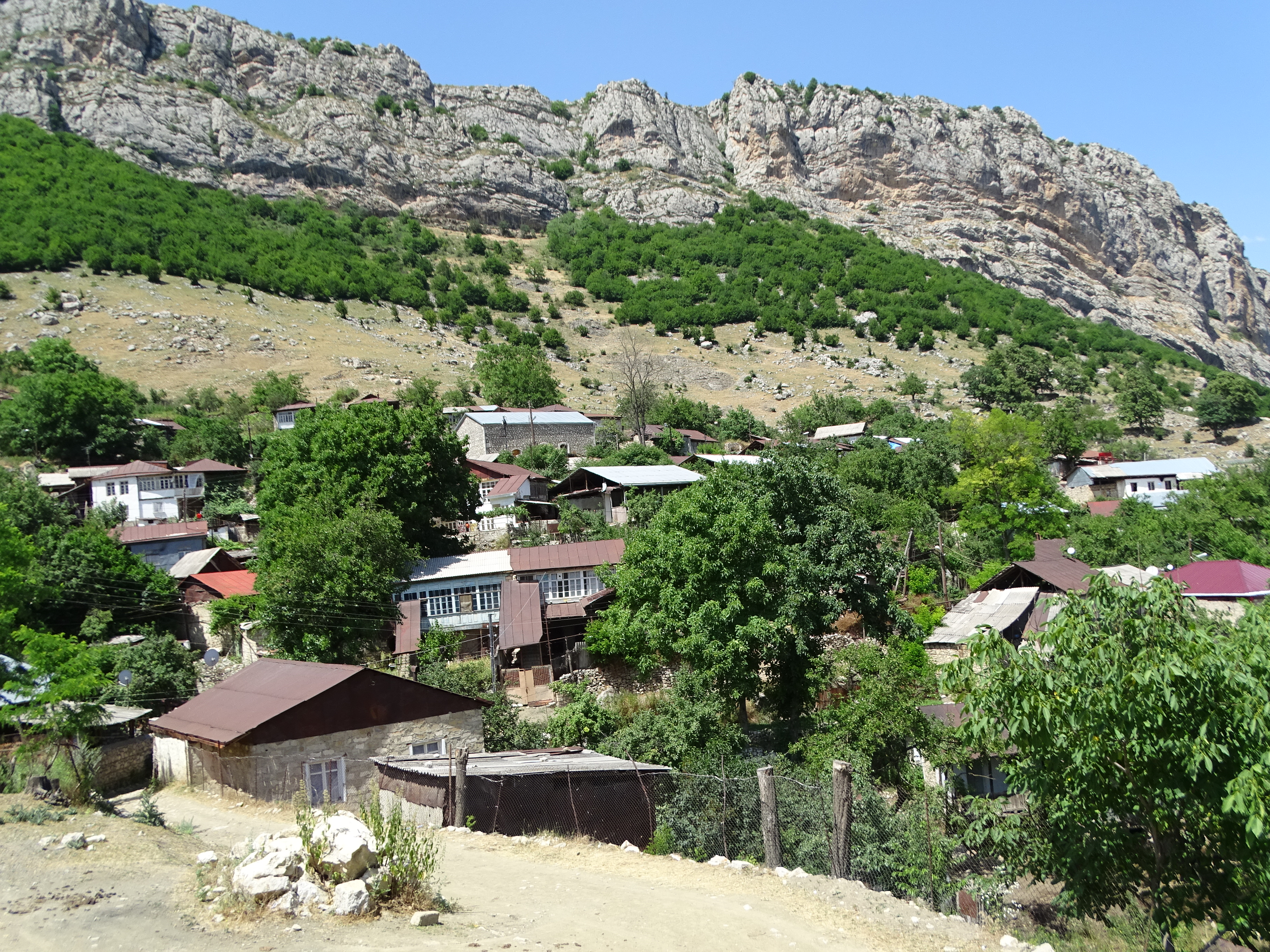
- Village in June 2015

- Location within Azerbaijan
- Coordinates: 39°44′30″N 46°44′57″E
- Country: Azerbaijan
- District: Shusha

Population (2015)
  - Total: 660
- Time zone: UTC+4 (AZT)

Dashalty (Azerbaijani: Daşaltı) or Karin Tak (Armenian: Քարին Տակ) was a village in the Shusha District of Azerbaijan, in the region of Nagorno-Karabakh. Until 2020, the village was controlled by the breakaway Republic of Artsakh. The village had an ethnic Armenian-majority population prior to the 2020 Nagorno-Karabakh war, and also had an Armenian majority in 1989.

As of 2024, the entire village of Karintak has been razed to the ground by Azerbaijan.

== Etymology ==
Both the Azerbaijani and Armenian names of the village mean "below the rock", referring to the sheer vertical cliffs towering above the village, on top of which Shusha is built.

== History ==
During the Soviet period, the village was part of the Shusha District of the Nagorno-Karabakh Autonomous Oblast. After the First Nagorno-Karabakh War, the village was administrated as part of the Shushi Province of the breakaway Republic of Artsakh. Shusha, located just above the village, was the last Azerbaijani stronghold in Nagorno-Karabakh to be captured by Armenian forces in the First Nagorno-Karabakh War. On January 26, 1992 Azerbaijani Defense Minister Mehdiyev "led a disastrous sortie out of Shusha to capture the Armenian village of Karintak", in which dozens of Azerbaijani soldiers died.

On 9 November 2020, the last day of the 2020 Nagorno-Karabakh war, Azerbaijani troops captured the village, and after that, the city of Shusha itself.

The village monument dedicated to the fallen in World War II was destroyed by Azerbaijani forces after the 2020 Nagorno-Karabakh war.

=== Destruction of the village ===
On April 5, 2024, Google Earth updated satellite images of the Nagorno Karabakh. The Monument Watch team documented that Azerbaijan razed the village to the ground, including its old neighborhoods, springs, civil infrastructure and natural environment.

== Historical heritage sites ==
Historical heritage sites in and around the village include a 13th-century khachkar, an 18th/19th-century cemetery, an 18th/19th-century bridge, a 19th-century watermill, and the church of Surb Astvatsatsin (Armenian: Սուրբ Աստվածածին, lit. 'Holy Mother of God') built in 1862.

Before Karintak was demolished, the old town square preserved the traditional architecture of the region.

There is also a plain village church that was restored by Land and Culture Organization volunteers in 1999–2000. It was originally built in 1816 in the place of a previously existing chapel.

== Demographics ==
The village had 588 inhabitants in 2005, and 660 inhabitants in 2015. Today there are no houses, nor inhabitants.

== Gallery ==
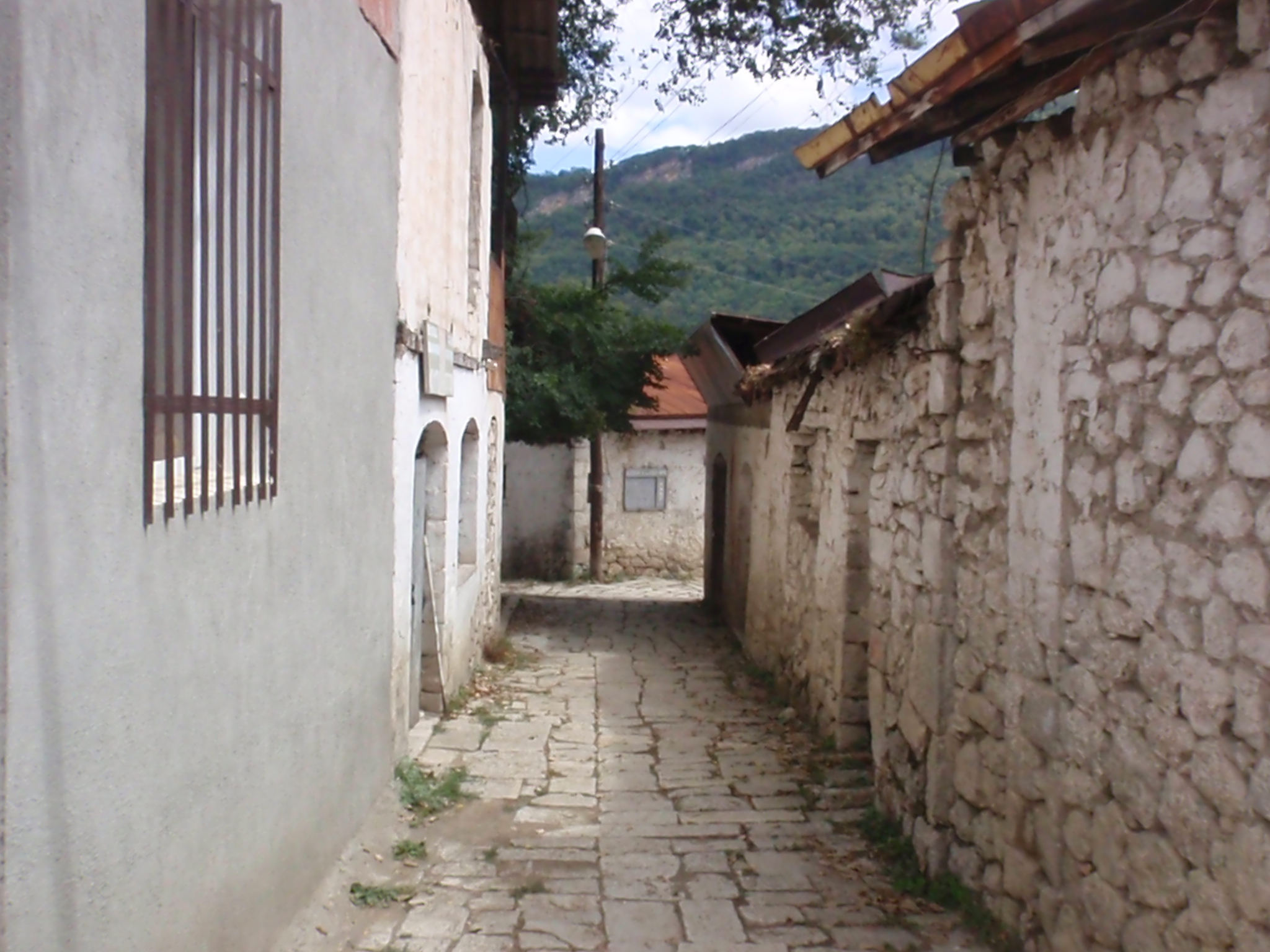
Village street

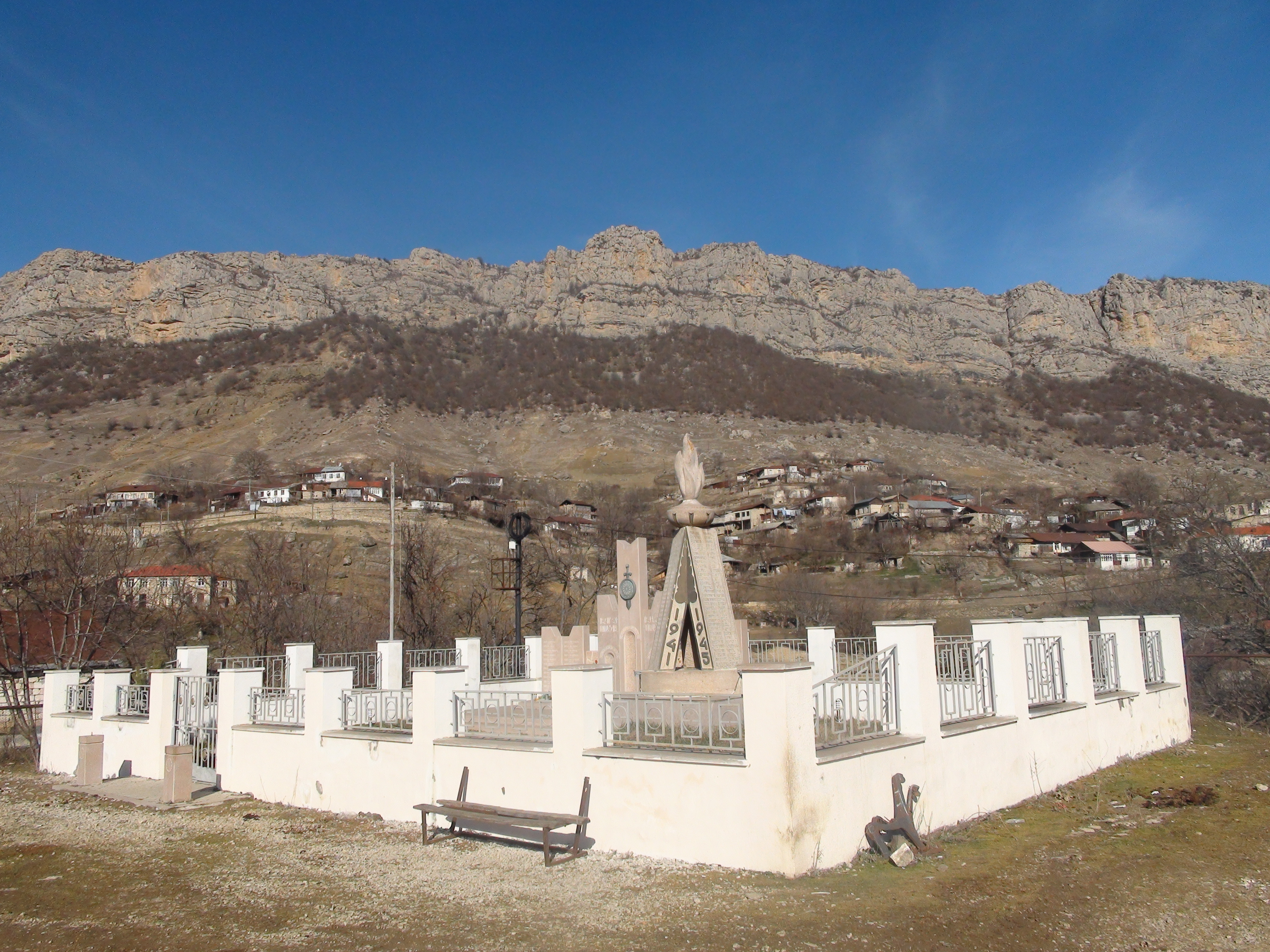
Monument dedicated to the fallen in WWII and the First Nagorno-Karabakh War

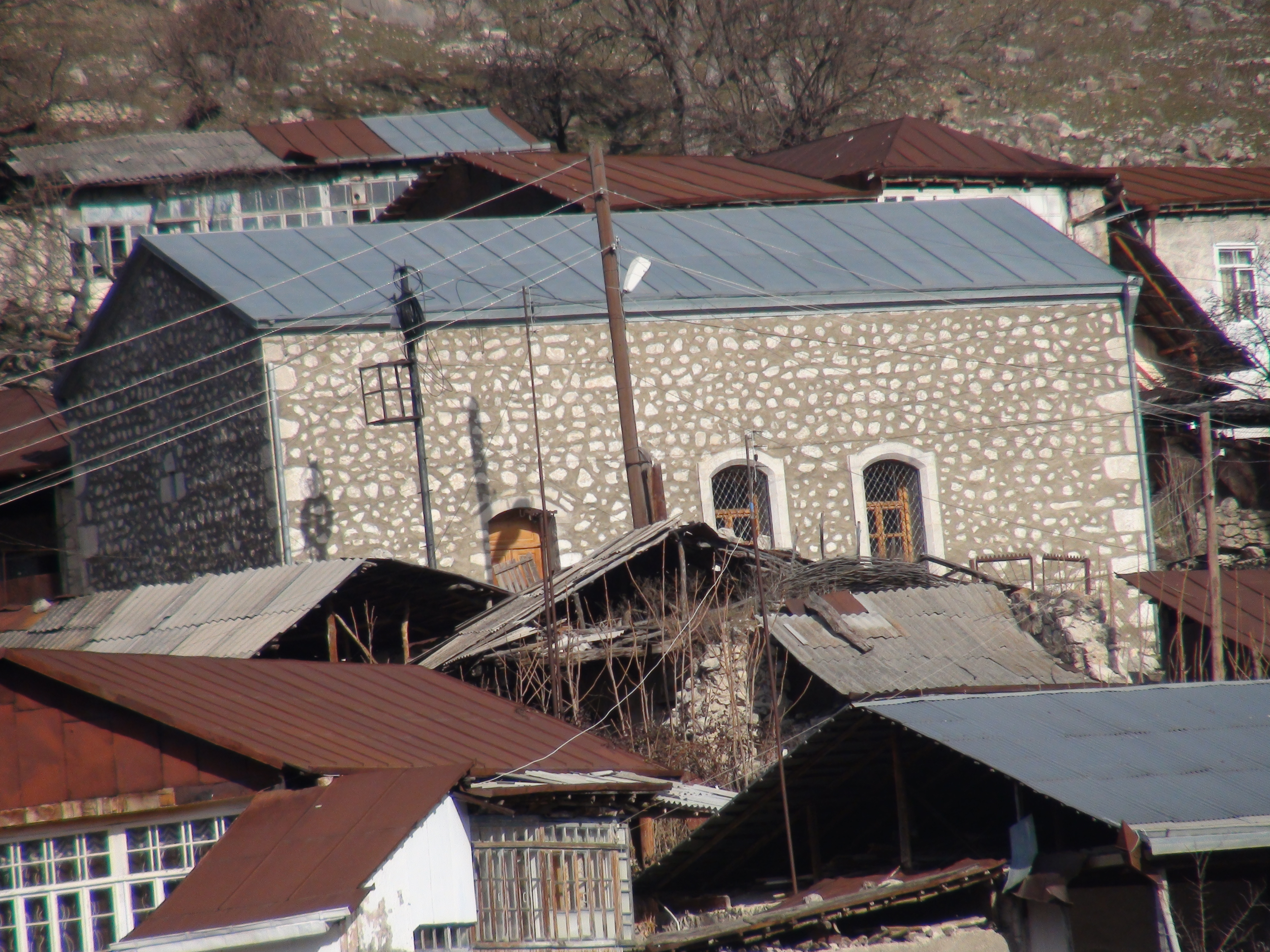
The church of Surb Astvatsatsin, built in 1862

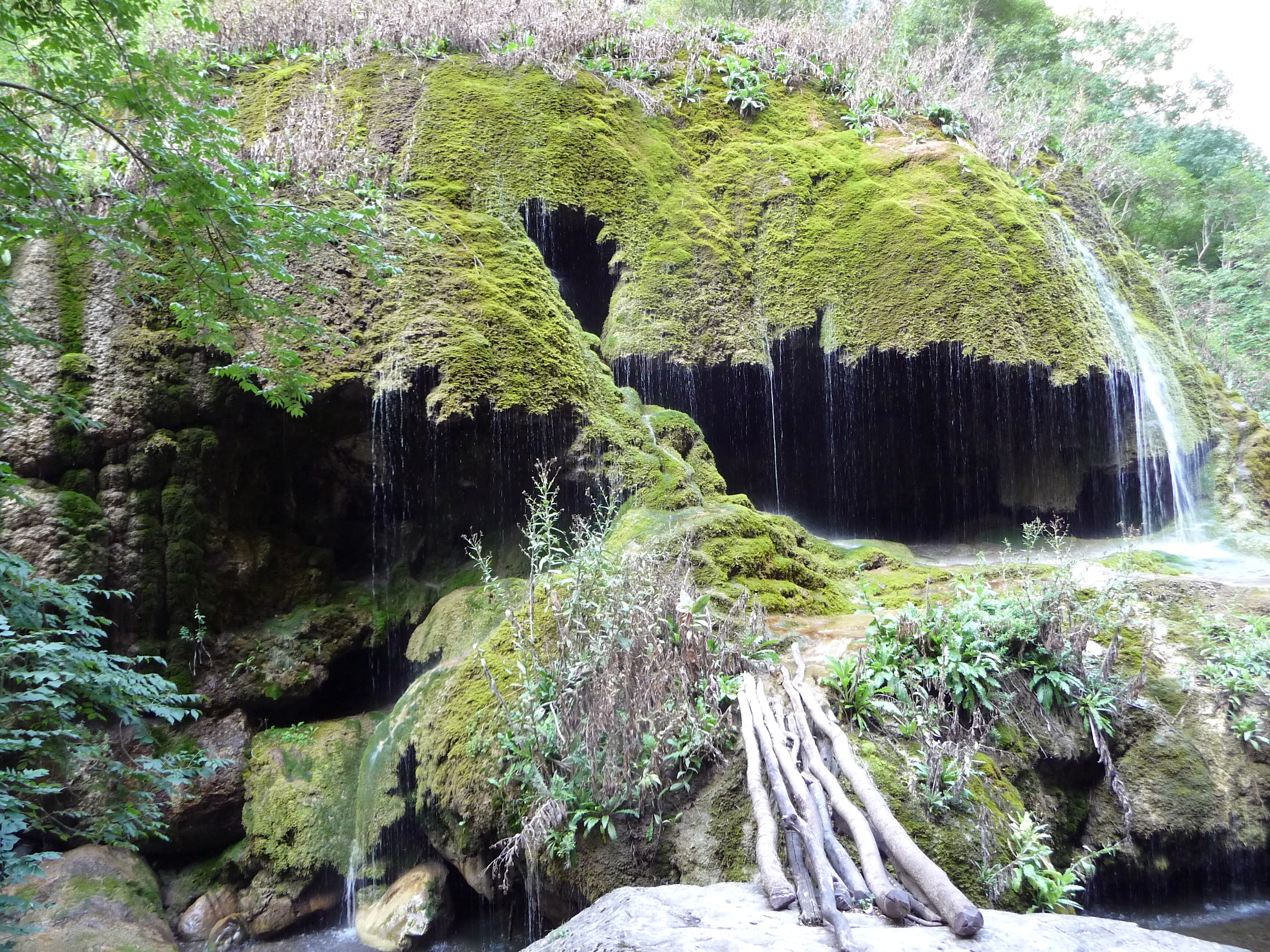
"Zontik" (Umbrella) waterfall in the Karkar Canyon

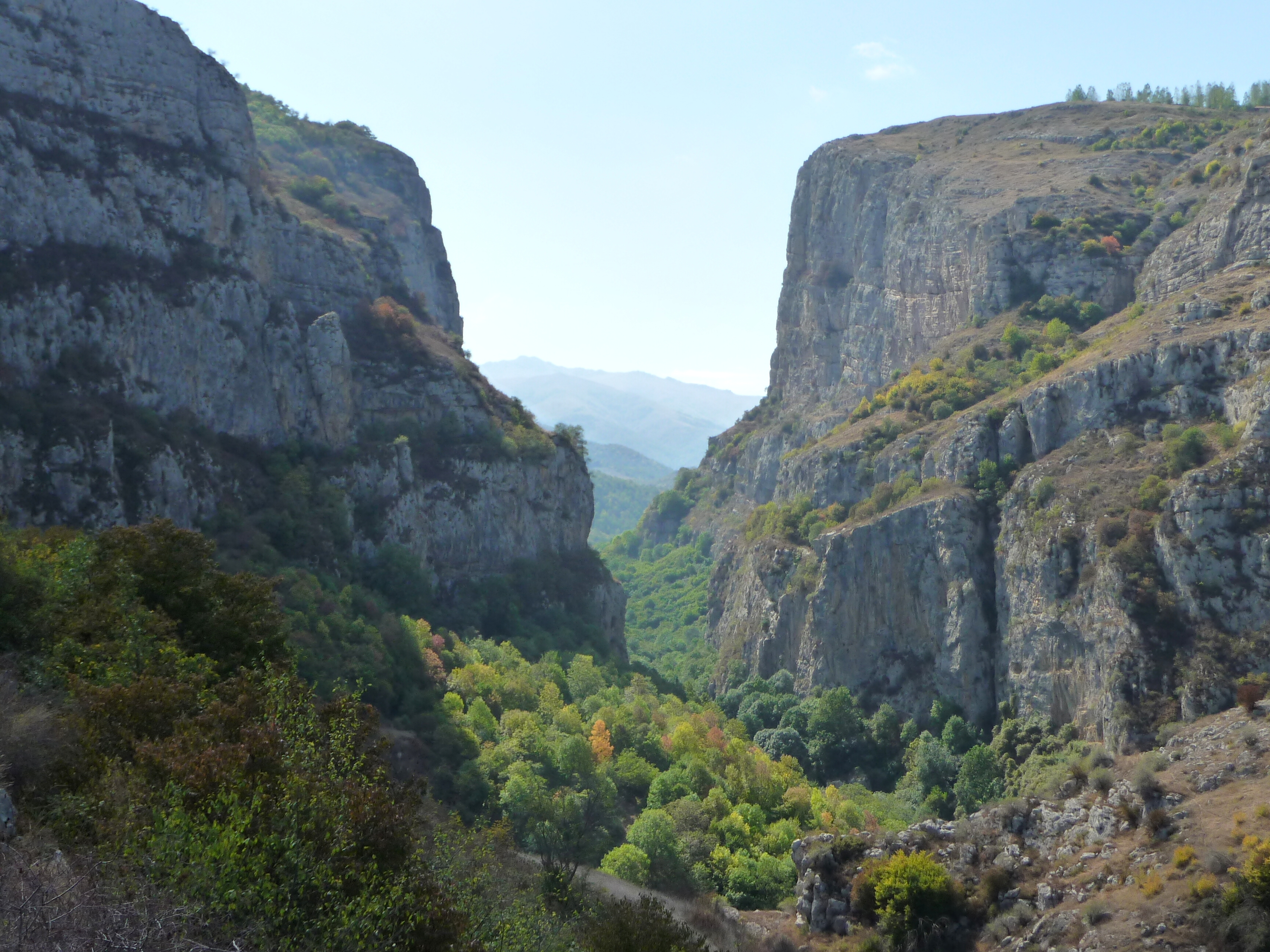
Karkar river canyon

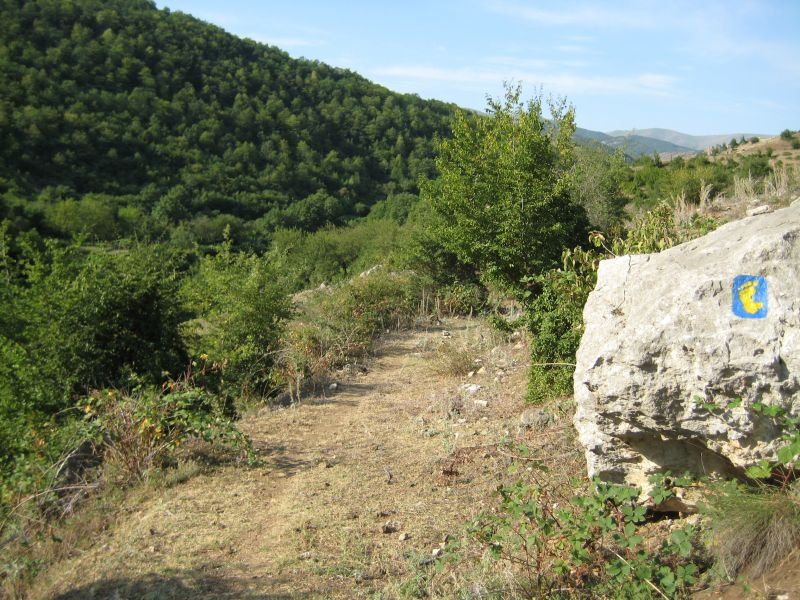
Section of the Janapar hiking trail passing by the village

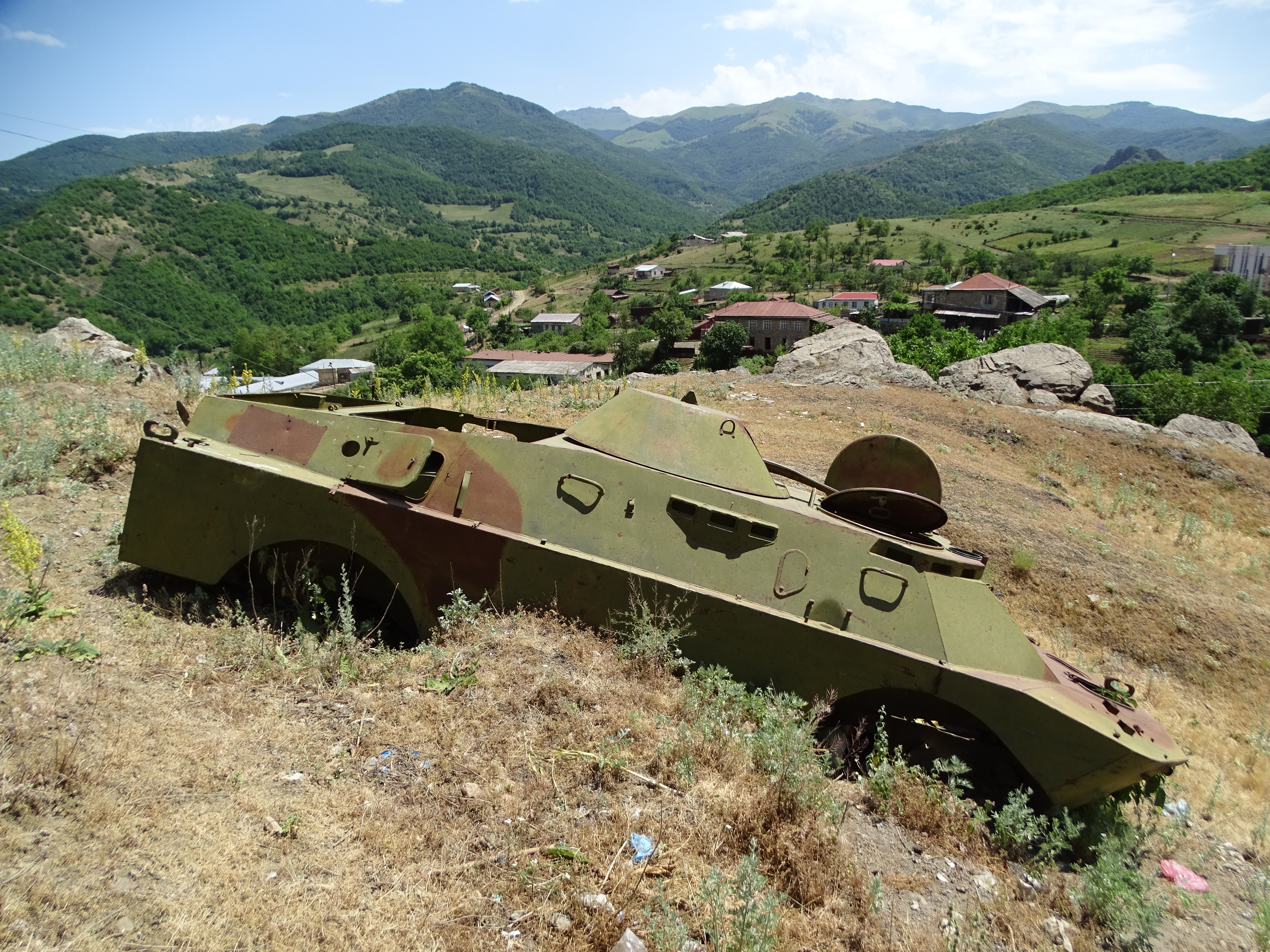
Destroyed military vehicle

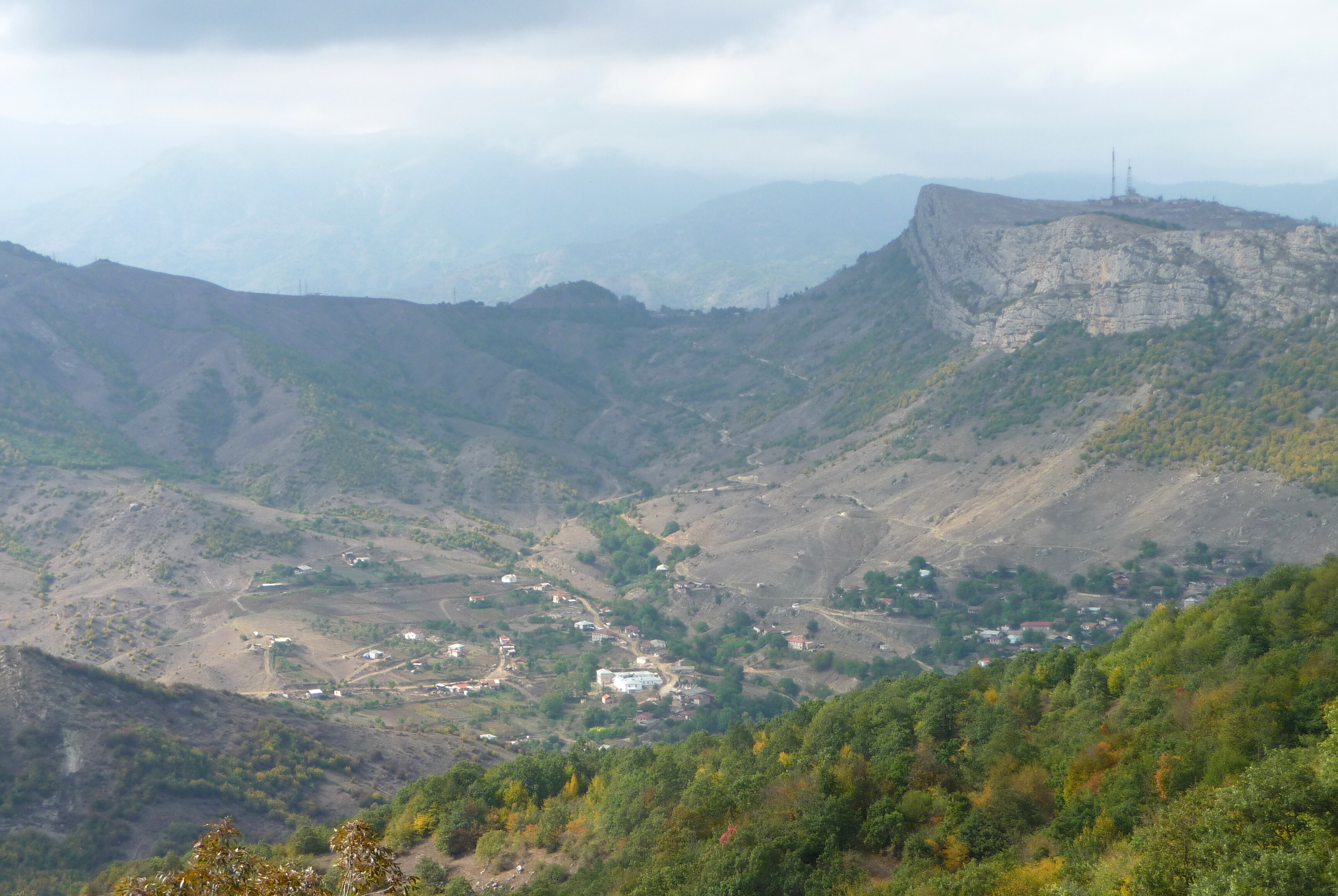
General view

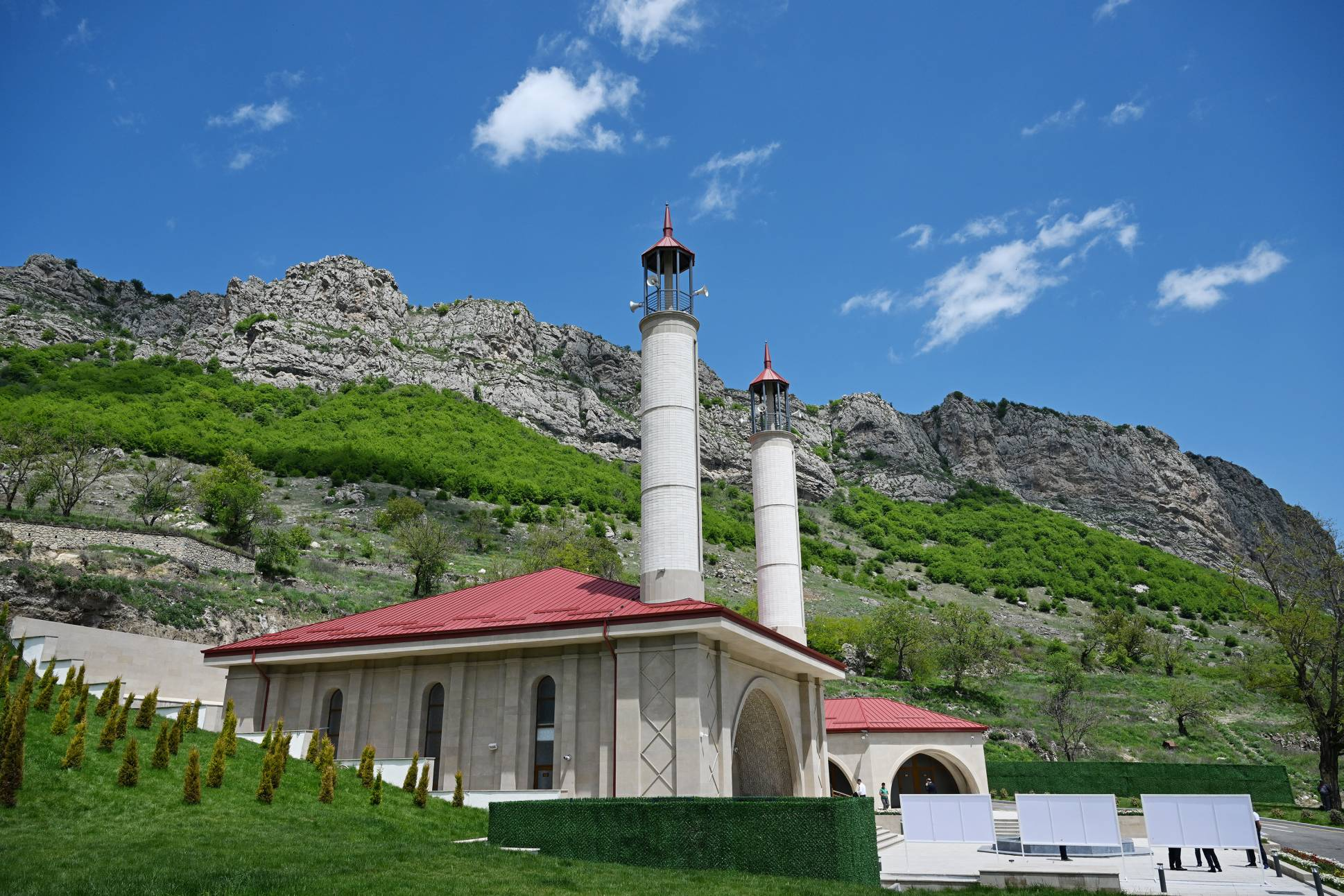
Newly built mosque where the village once stood. May 2025
