= Janapar =

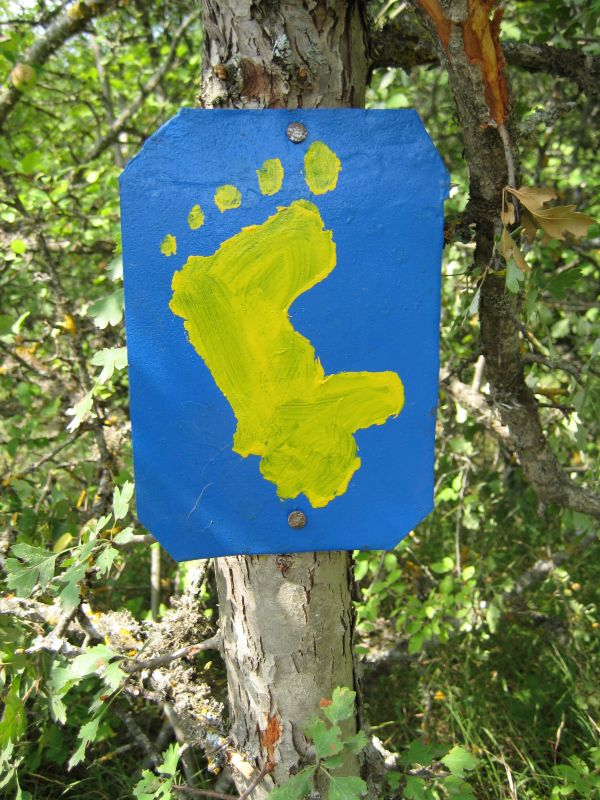
Sign marking the Janapar trail

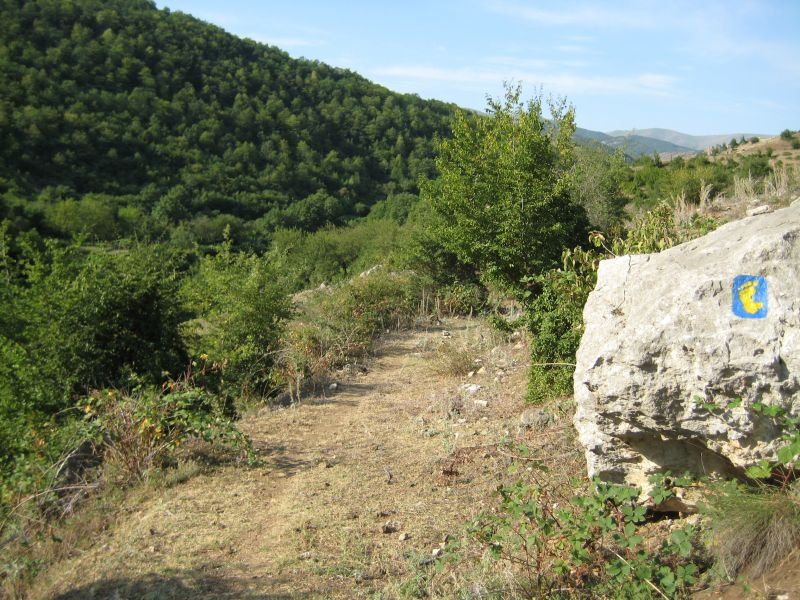
Section of Janapar trail

Janapar Trail (Armenian: Ճանապարհ թրեյլ) was a marked trail through mountains, valleys, and villages of the region of Nagorno-Karabakh, which passed by monasteries and fortresses along its route. The trail consisted of several day hikes, taking hikers to a different village each night. Hikers could either stay with a village family or set up camp nearby. The paths have existed for centuries but markings were added in recent years specifically for hikers. Provided markers were blue with a yellow footprint. According to the trail's official website, much of the trail became impassable as a result of the 2020 Nagorno-Karabakh war, with only the Stepanakert to Patara and Kolotak to Gandzasar sections remaining traversable.

== Janapar Trail Route ==
The Janapar Trail, marked in 2007, led from the southern town of Hadrut to the capital of Stepanakert over the course of a week. From there the trail continues north to the region of Shahumian, and on to Vardenis in Armenia. Important sites along this hike include Dadivank monastery, Gandzasar monastery, Shusha, the Karkar Canyon with its high cliffs, the astonishing Zontik Waterfall and ruins of Hunot, as well as the 2,000-year-old tree, called Tnjri, Azykh Cave and Gtichavank monastery. There are also hot springs in Zar, a geyser near Karvarchar city, and other springs and waterfalls along the way.

In 2018 Trails For Change NGO repainted the blazing on the entire trail. The trail creators advise hikers to use the Viewranger app or a GPS with the downloaded tracks, or the topographic maps made available on the Janapar website.

== Janapar symbol ==
The symbol of the trail is a footprint with the silhouette of Nagorno-Karabakh, which is composed of a single wandering line, which represents a hiking trail.

== Gallery ==
Photos from along the Janapar

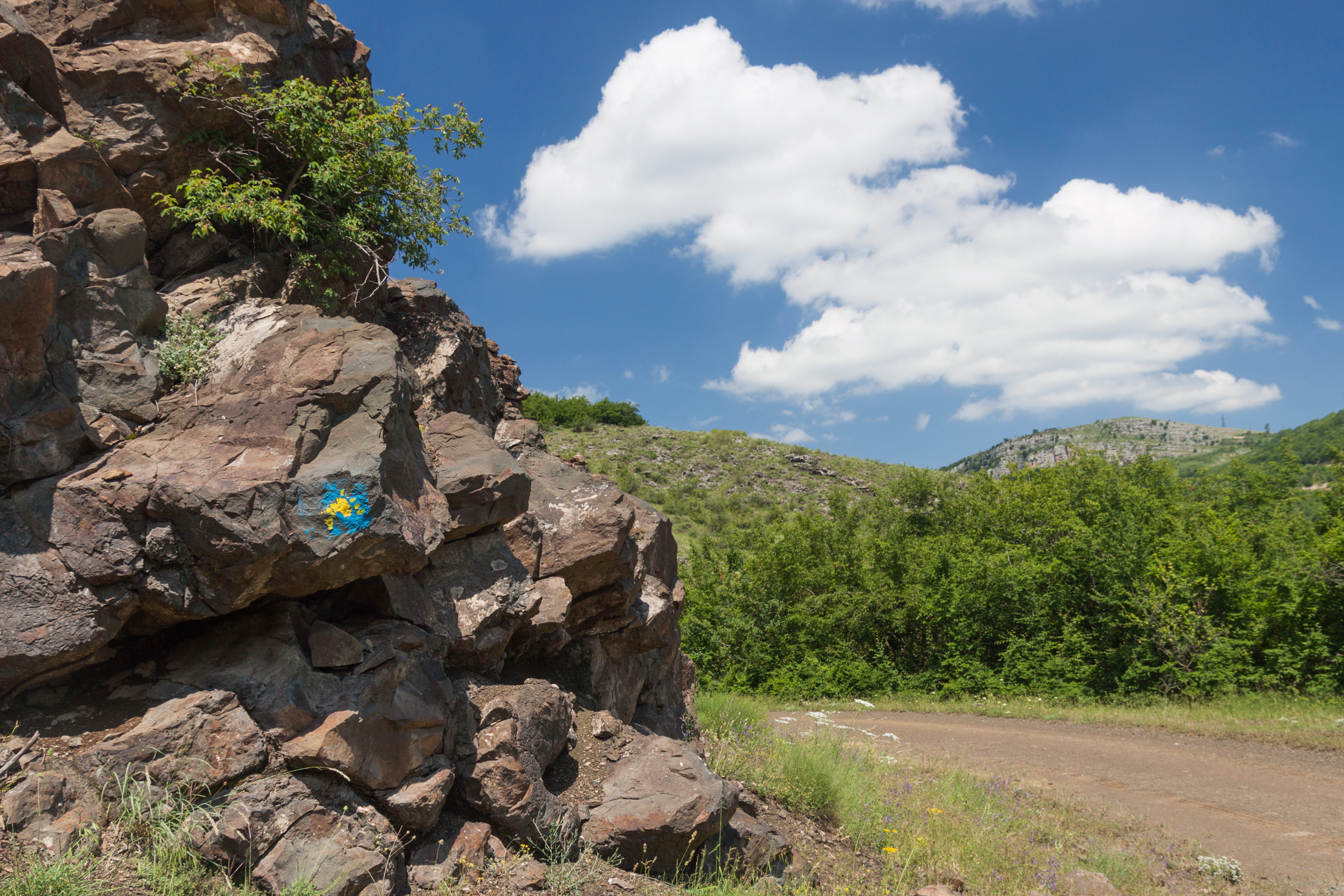
The views from the Janapar tourist route. Section between the cities Shusha and Stepanakert

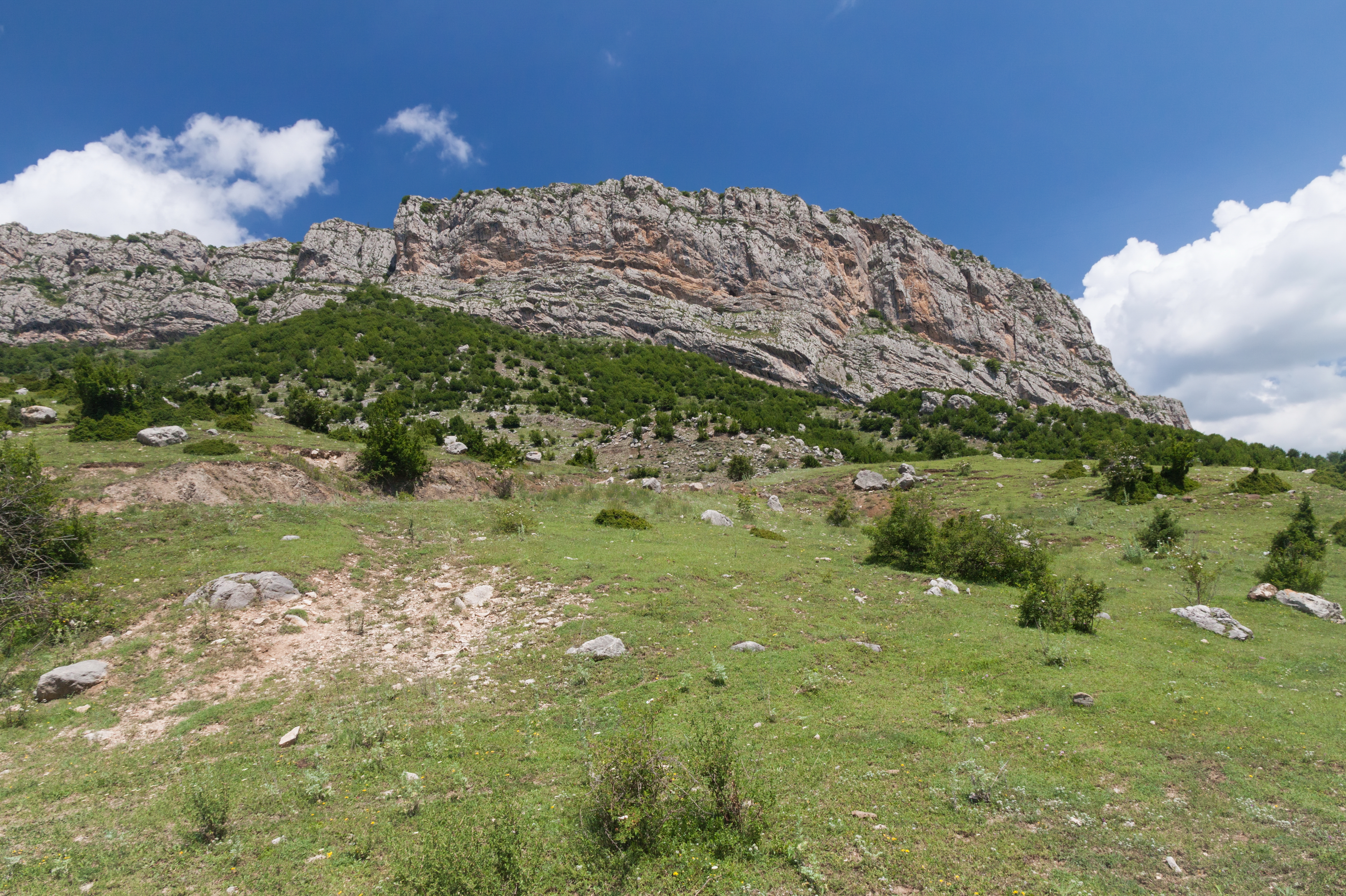
The view from the Janapar tourist route. Section between Karintak village and the city of Shusha

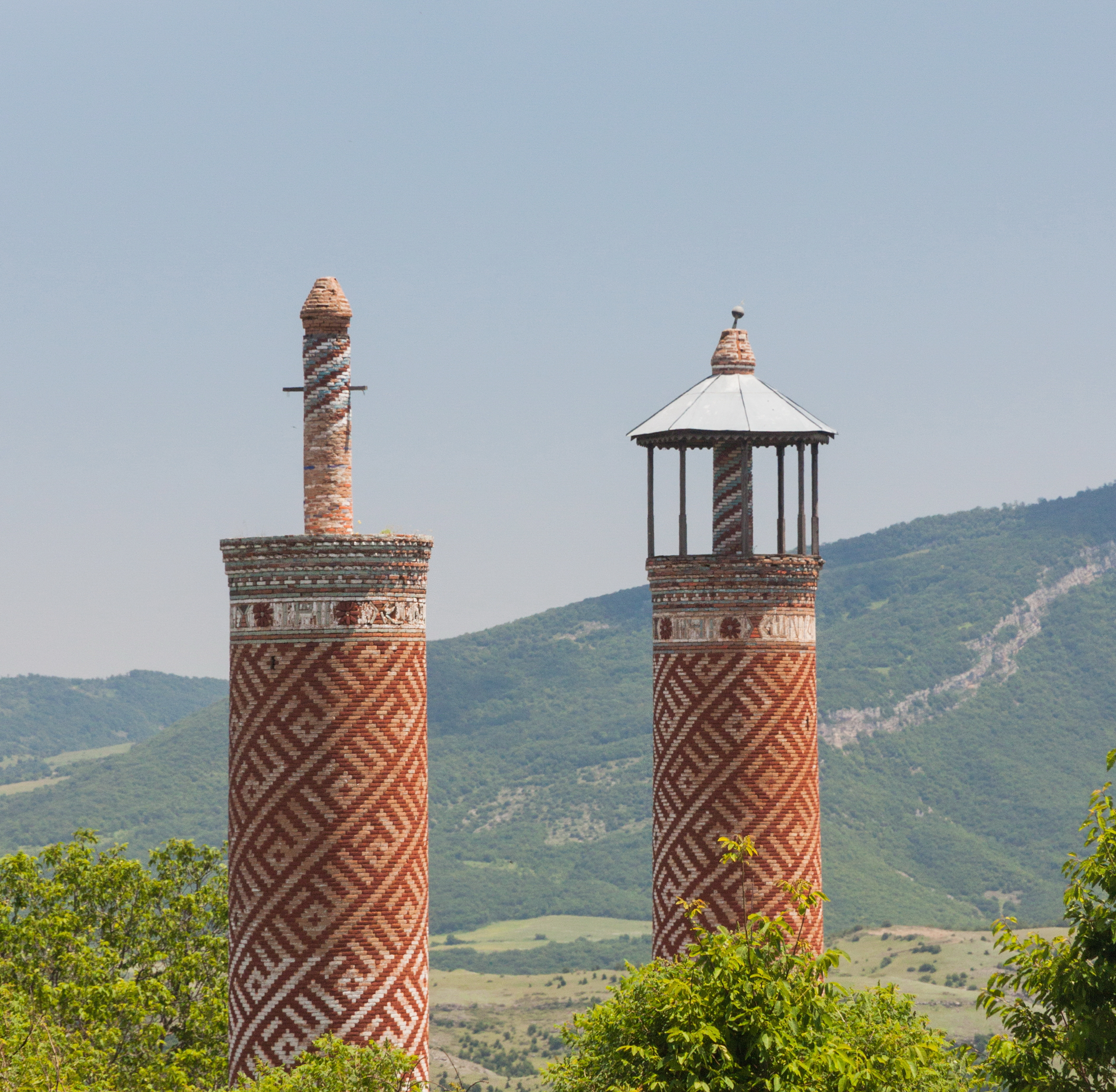
Minarets of Ashaghi Govhar Agha Mosque in Shusha

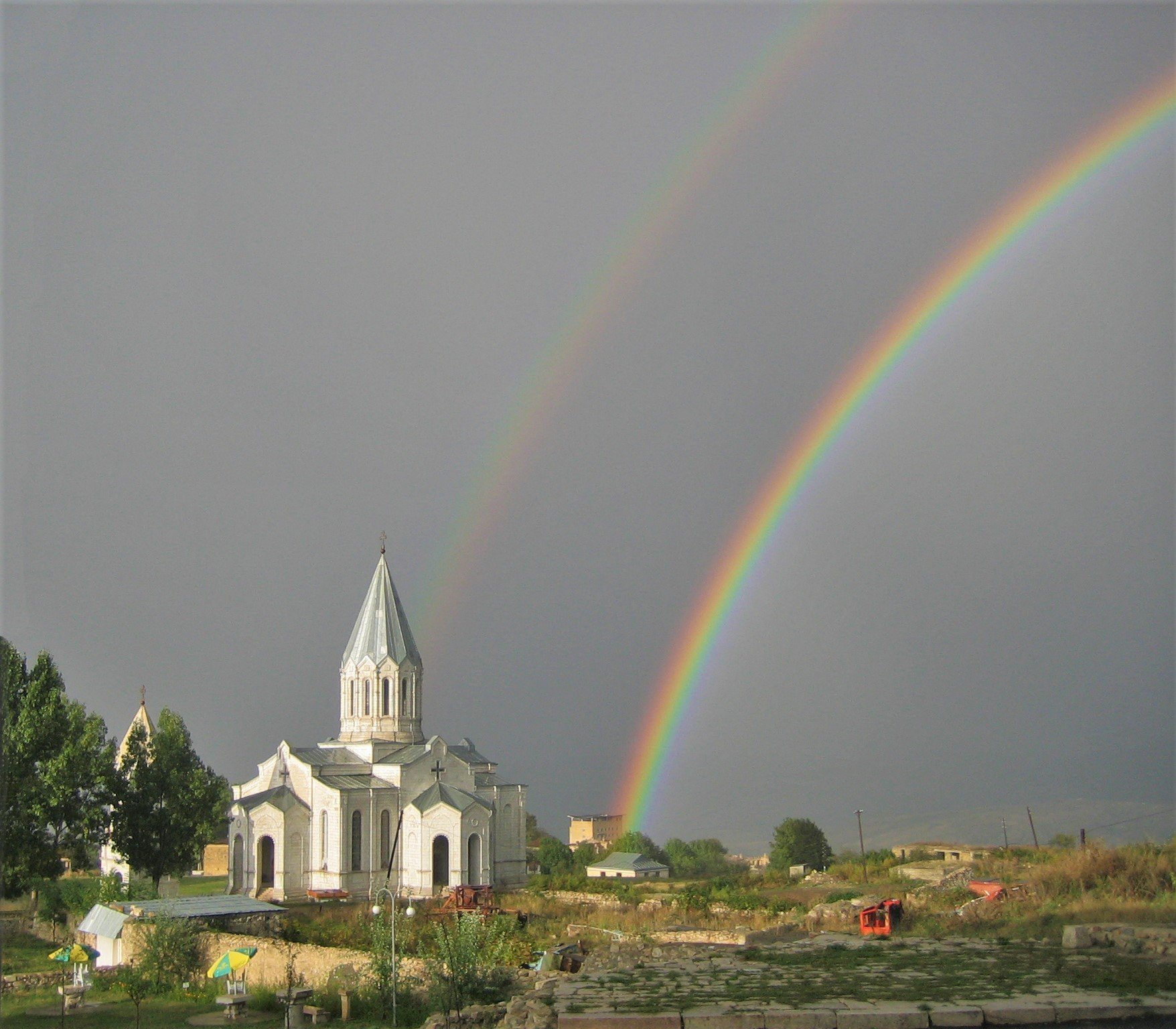
Cathedral of Shusha

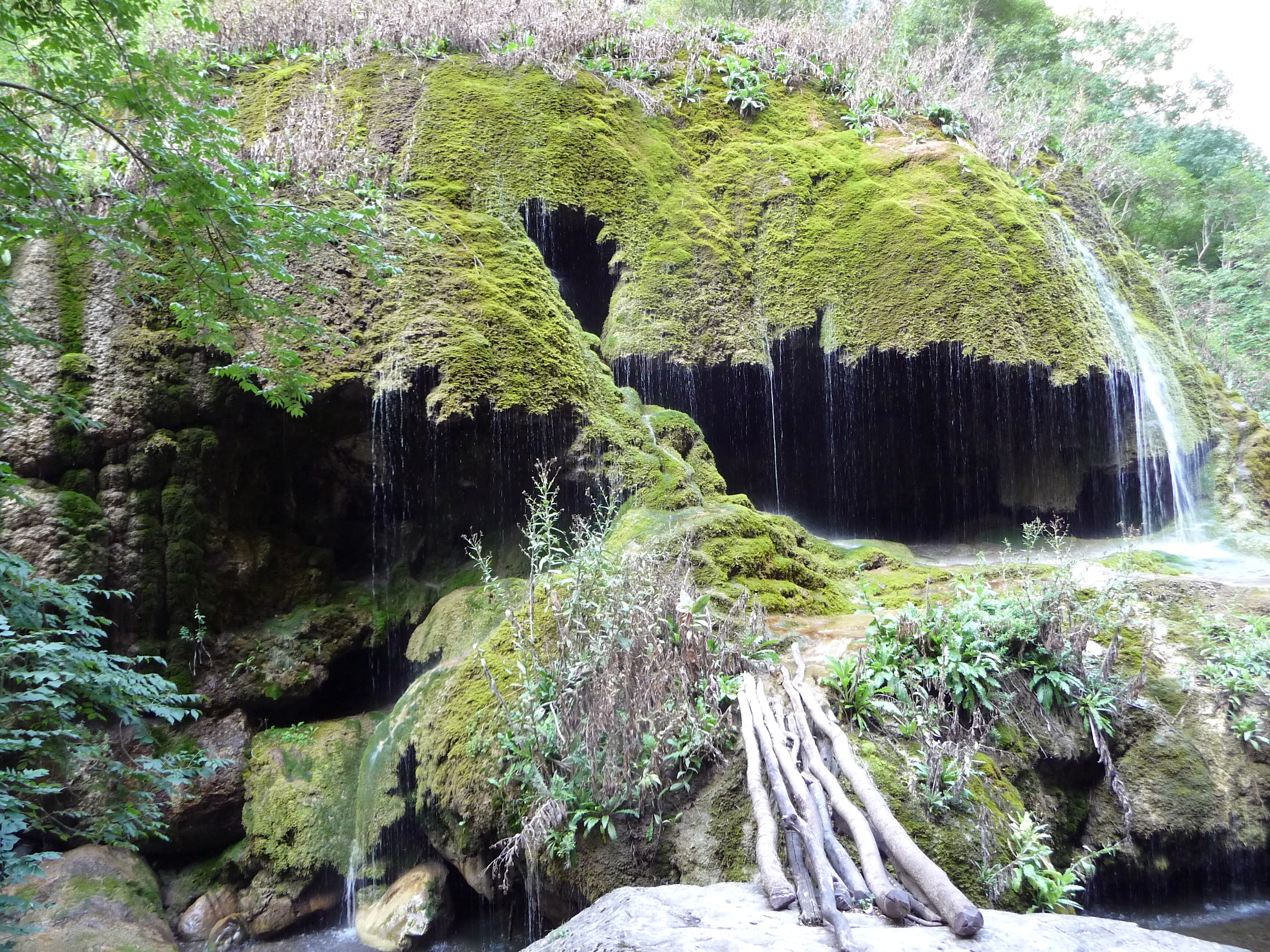
Zontik Waterfall in Gargarchay (Karkar) Canyon

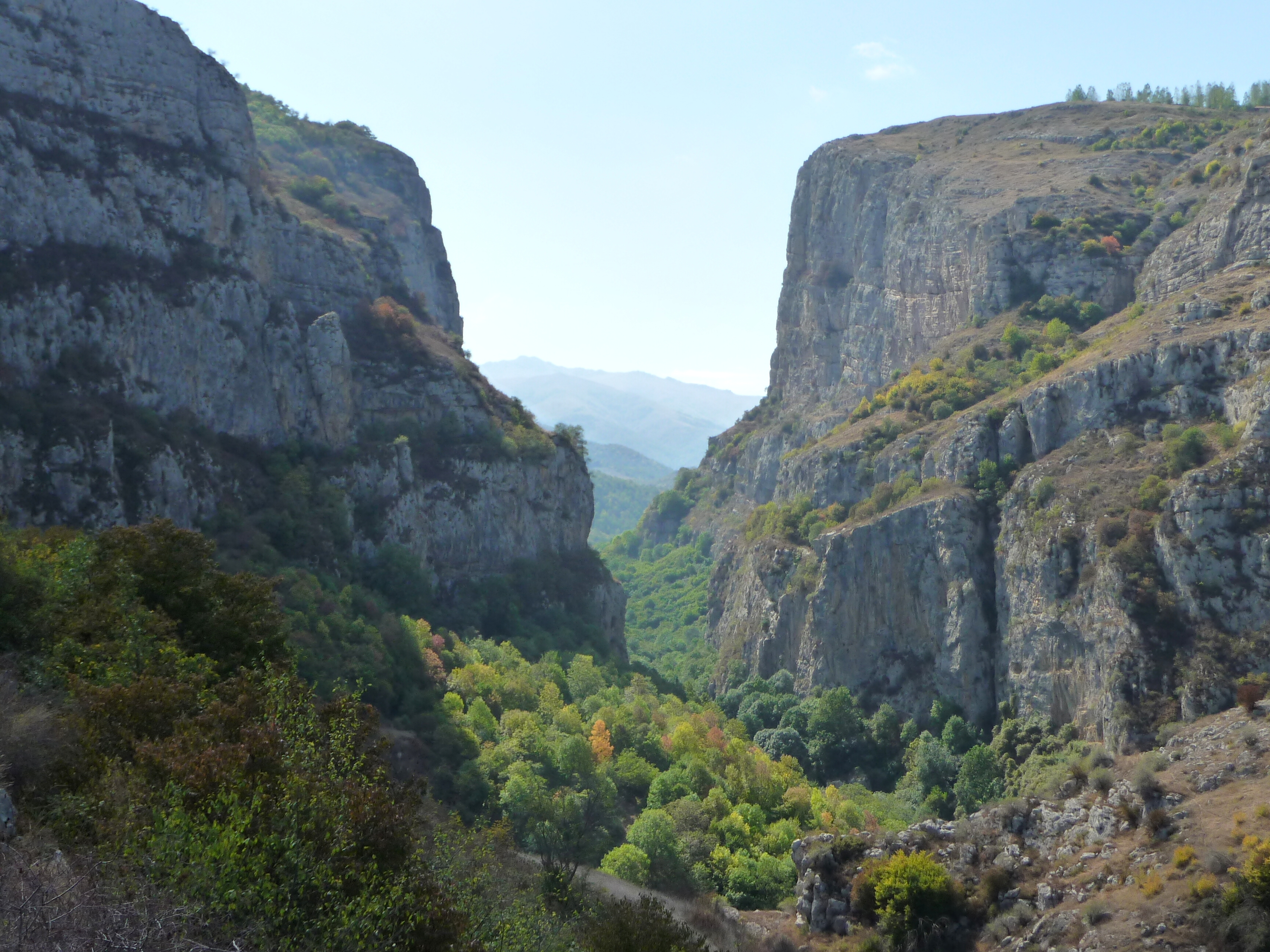
Gargarchay (Karkar) Canyon

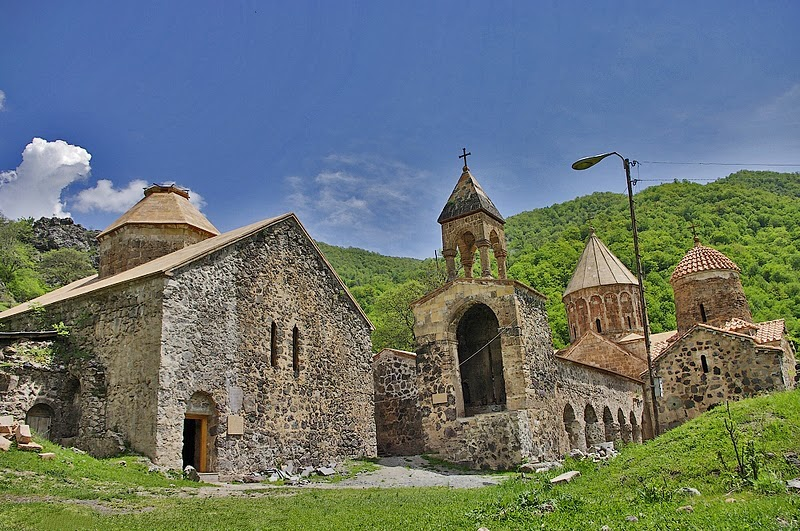
Dadivank Monastery

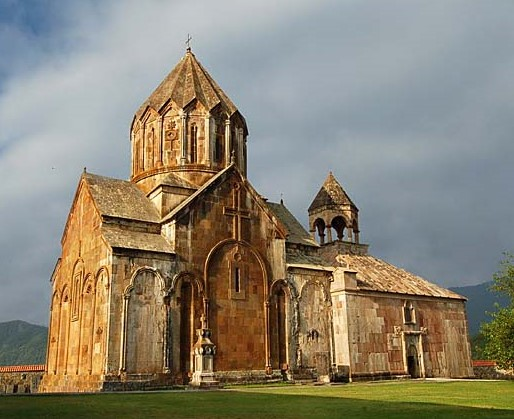
Gandzasar Monastery

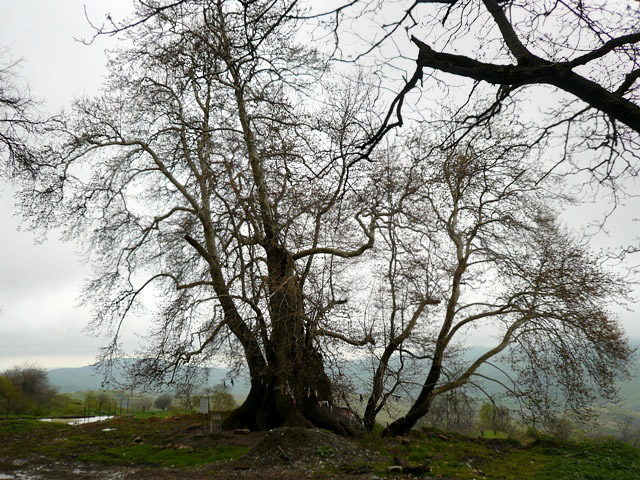
2,000-year-old Tnjri tree

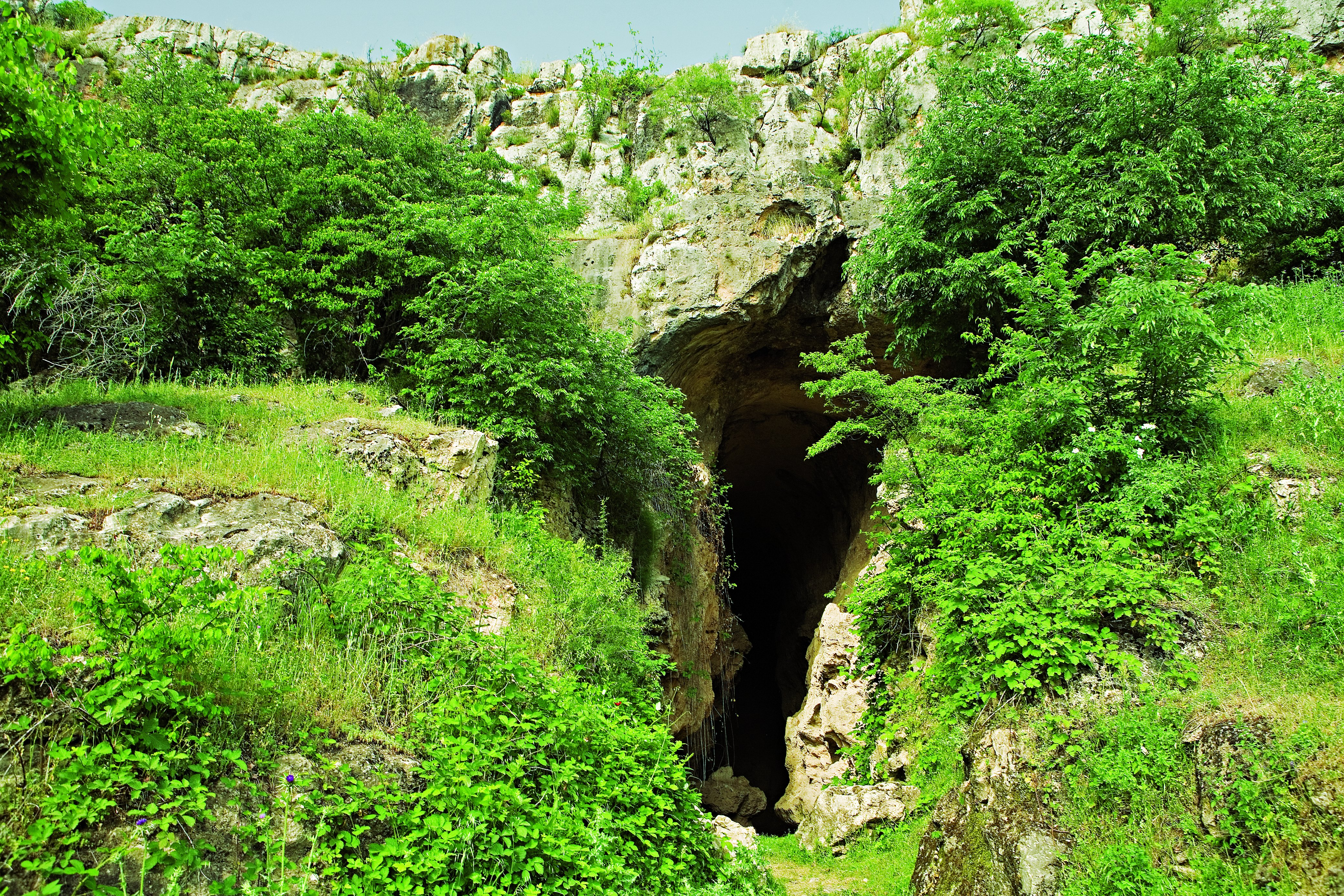
Azykh Cave

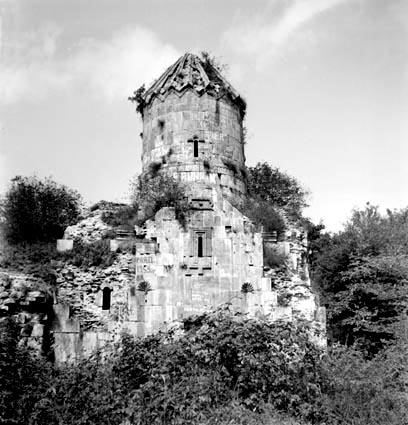
Gtichavank (old photo)

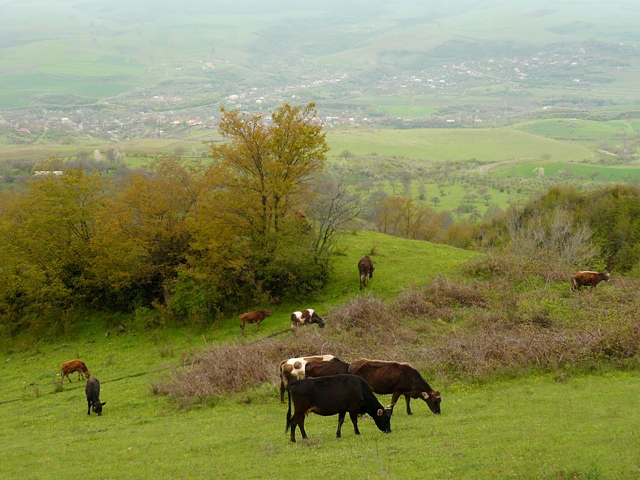
Fields near Karmir Shuka

== Sources ==
- Destination Janapar - Yerevan Magazine, May–June 2013
- Le Janapar Trail - Nouvelle d'Arménie, April 2013 (No. 195, pp. 68–73)
- נגורנו קראבאך: מסע בארץ מצולקת
