= Hakobavank =

Church in Kolatağ, Azerbaijan

- Հակոբավանք; Մեծառանից վանք
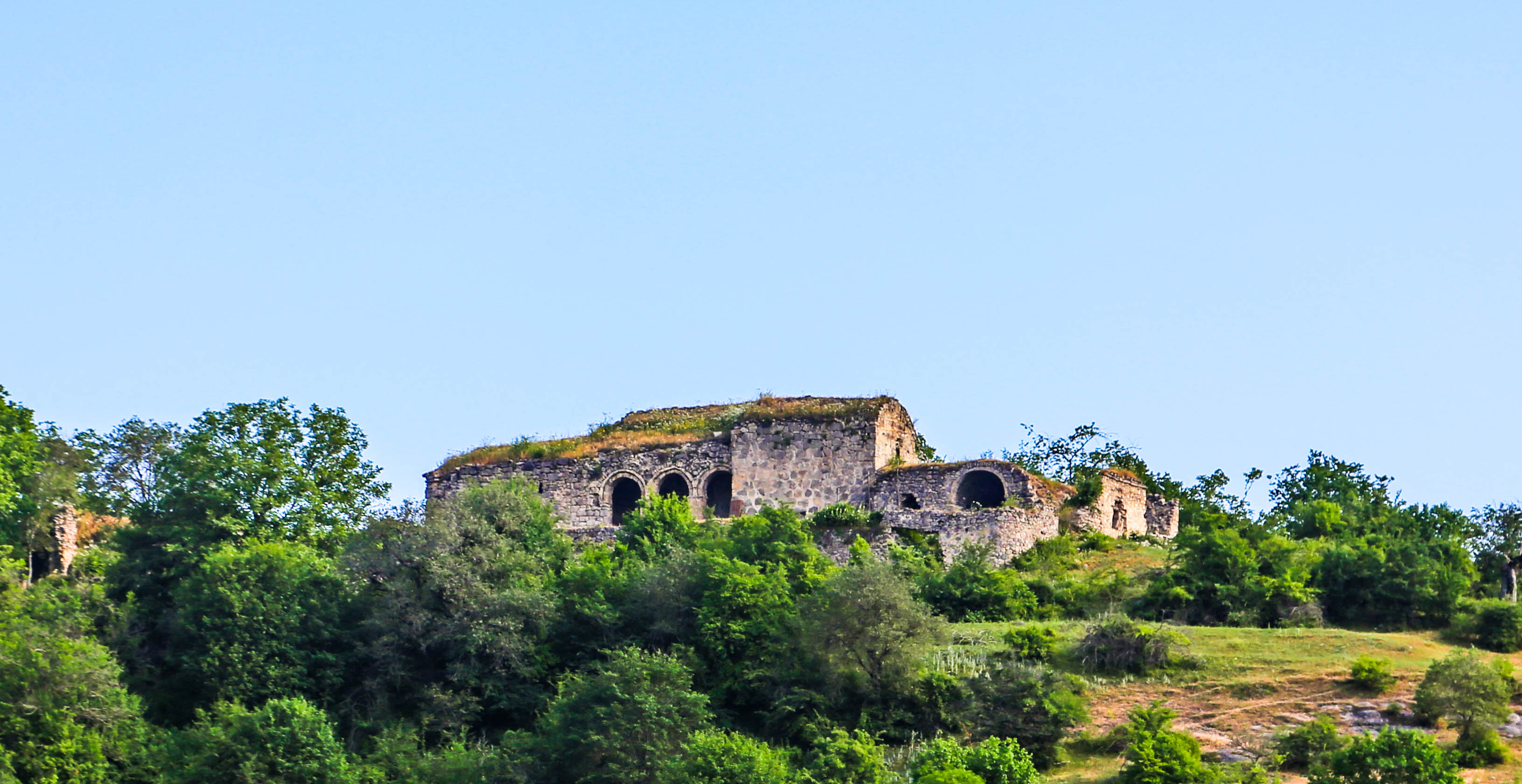
- Hakobavank Monastery in 2015

- Location within Azerbaijan

Religion
- Affiliation: Armenian Apostolic Church
- Region: Kalbajar District

Location
- Location: 1.5 km from the village of Kolatak, Nagorno-Karabakh
- Country: Azerbaijan
- Interactive map of Hakobavank
- Coordinates: 40.0156°N 46.6005°E

Architecture
- Type: Monastery
- Style: Armenian
- Established: 5th-7th centuries
- Completed: 11th-12th centuries

Hakobavank (Armenian: Հակոբավանք, lit. 'monastery of Hakob'), also known as Metsaranits Monastery (Armenian: Մեծառանից վանք), is an Armenian monastery situated near the village of Kolatak, in the region of Nagorno-Karabakh, Azerbaijan.

== History ==
Hakobavank was established in the 5th-7th centuries. It acquired its final form by the 11th-12th centuries. In the 14th century the monastery became the deaconry of the district of Mets Arank (genitive: Metsaranits). The complex is named after Jacob of Nisibis.

There is no information about the date of foundation of the monastery. The oldest inscription, carved on the pedestal of a khachkar (cross-stone), refers to the year of 853. According to the historical chronicles, the monastery buildings were built, rebuilt and reconstructed periodically between the 9th and 18th centuries. One of the manuscripts kept in Matenadaran says that the Metsaranits Church was rebuilt by Khorinshah Zakarian.

A renovation project of the monastery complex commenced in 2022.

== Gallery ==
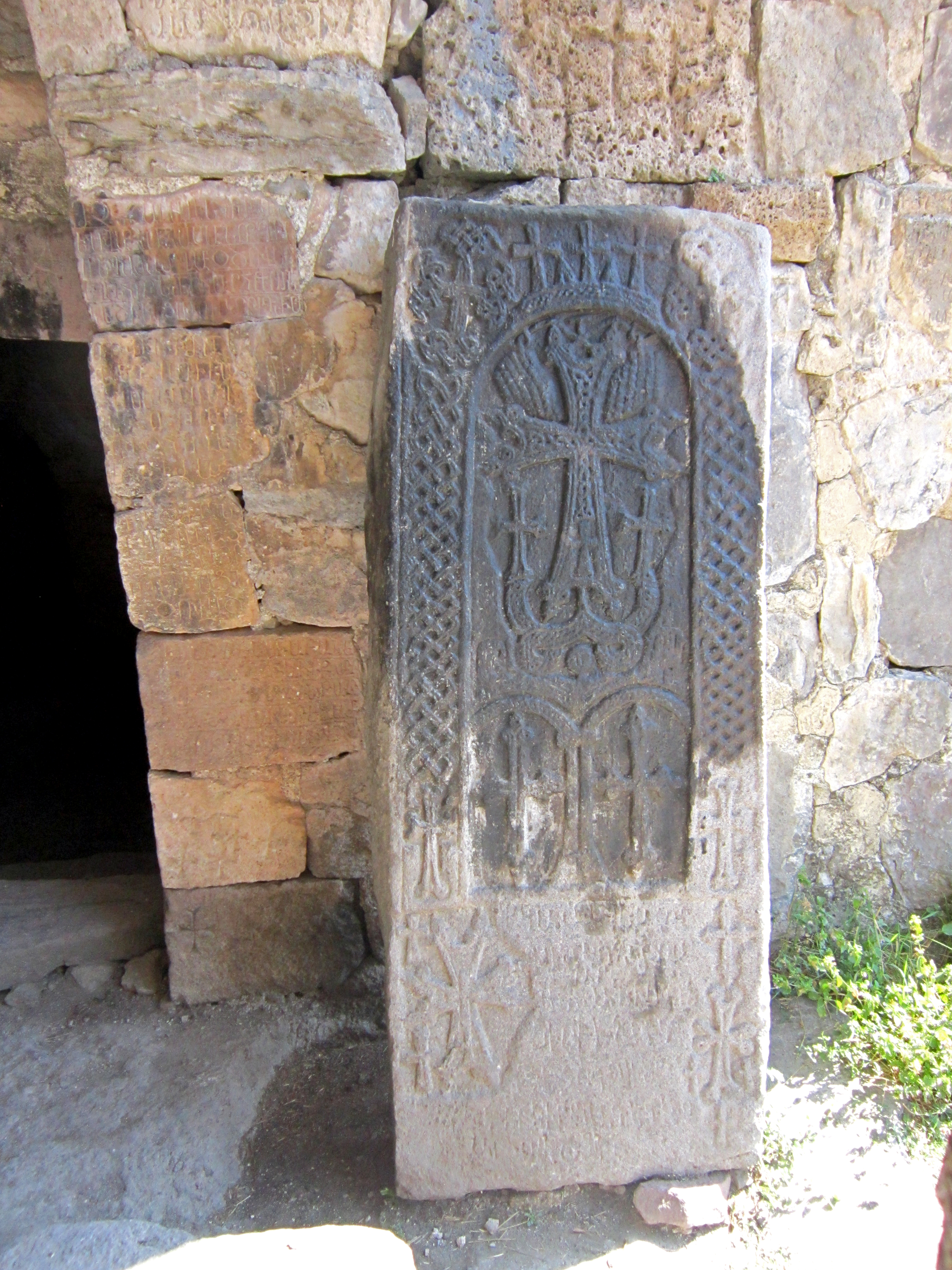

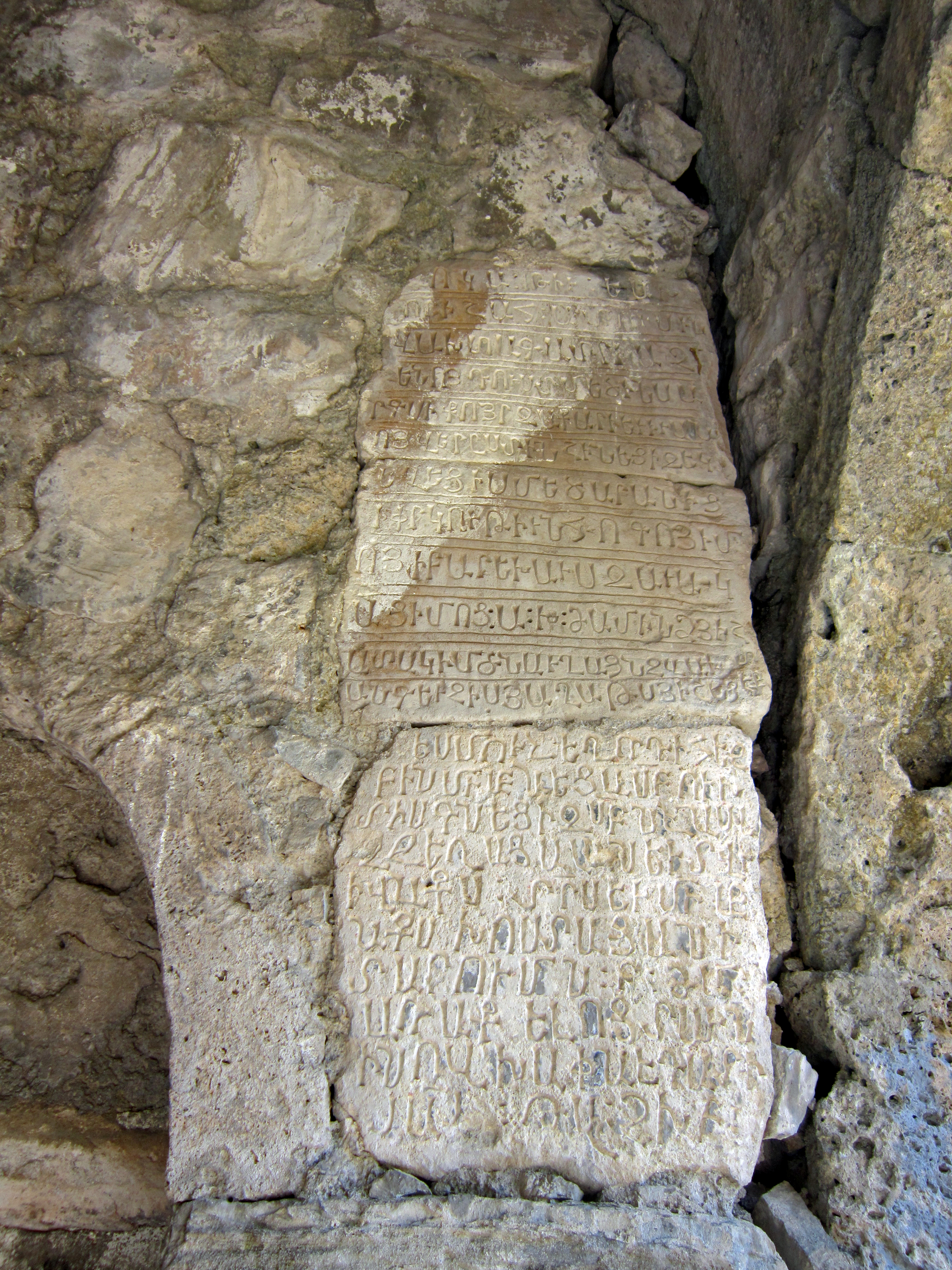

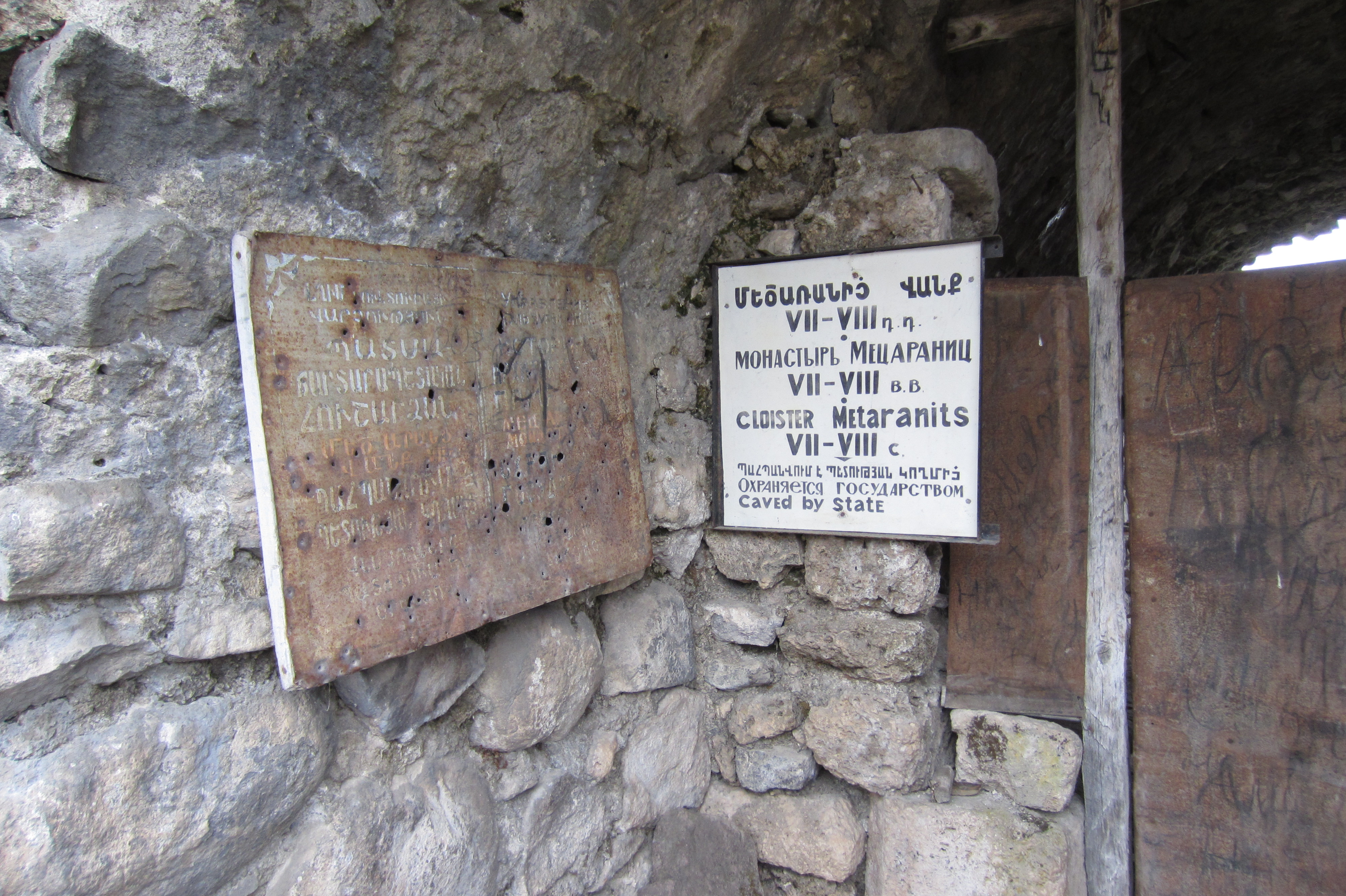

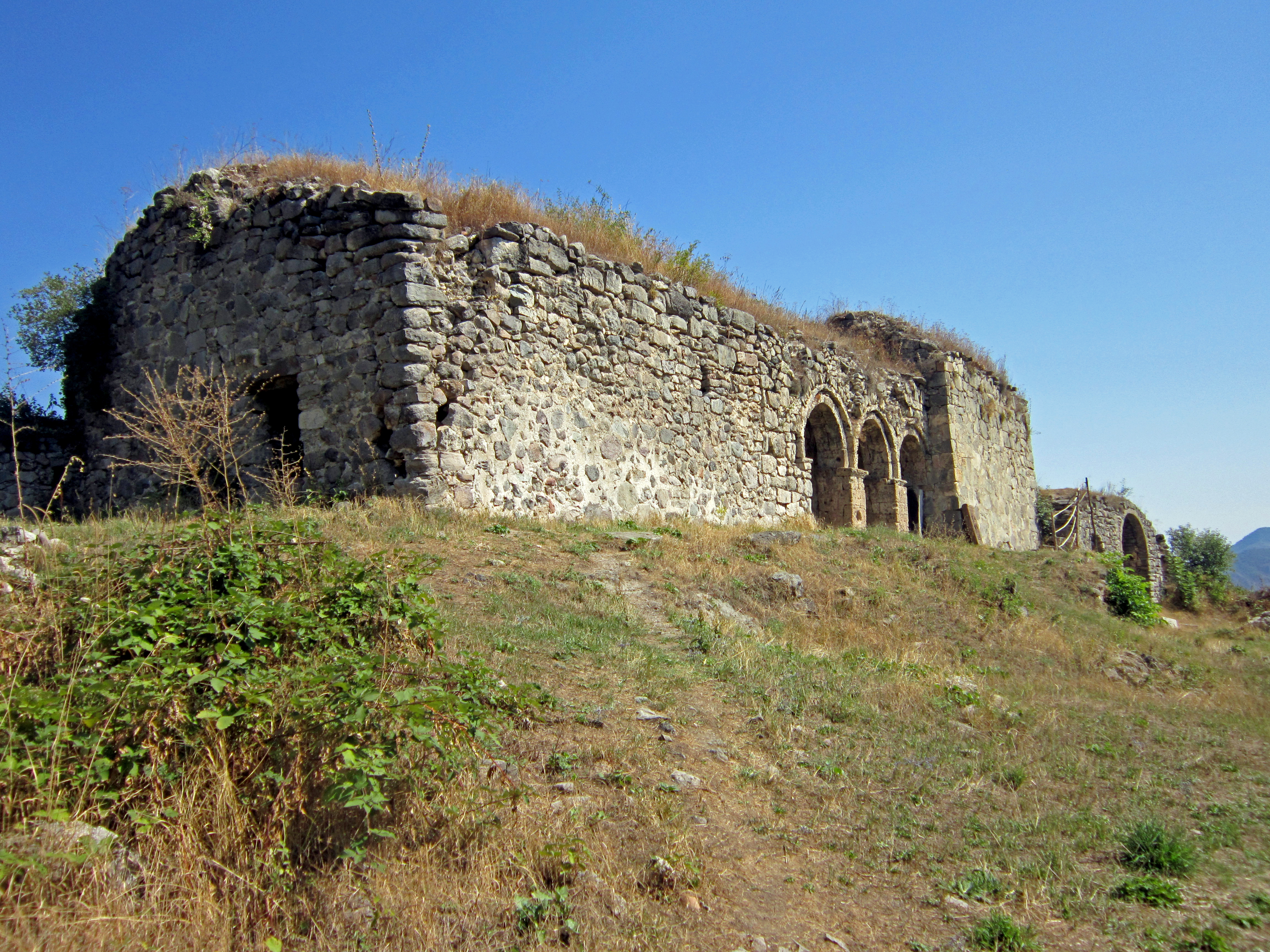

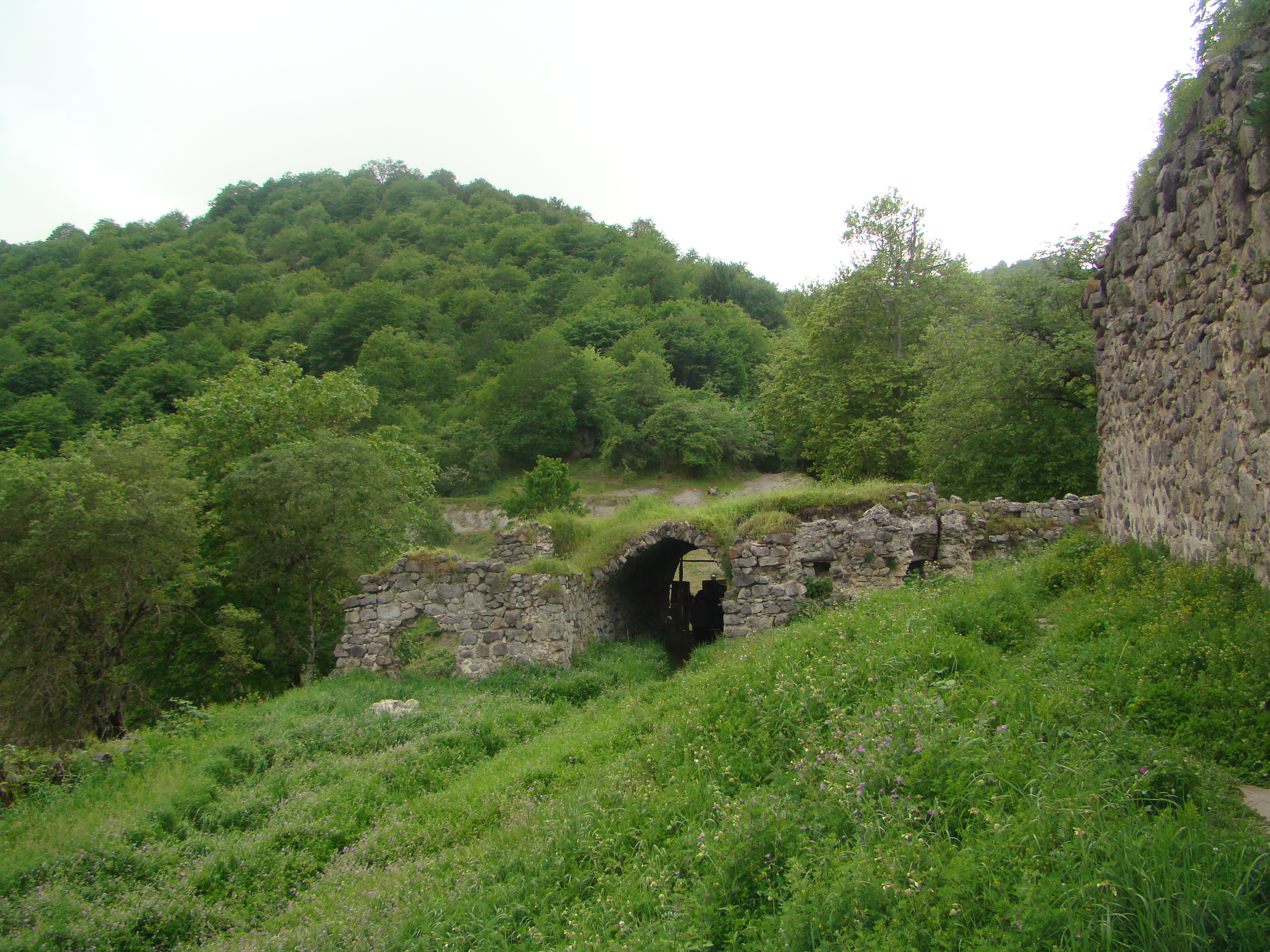
