= Kolatak =

Village in Kalbajar District, Azerbaijan

Kolatak Քոլատակ
- Kolatağ
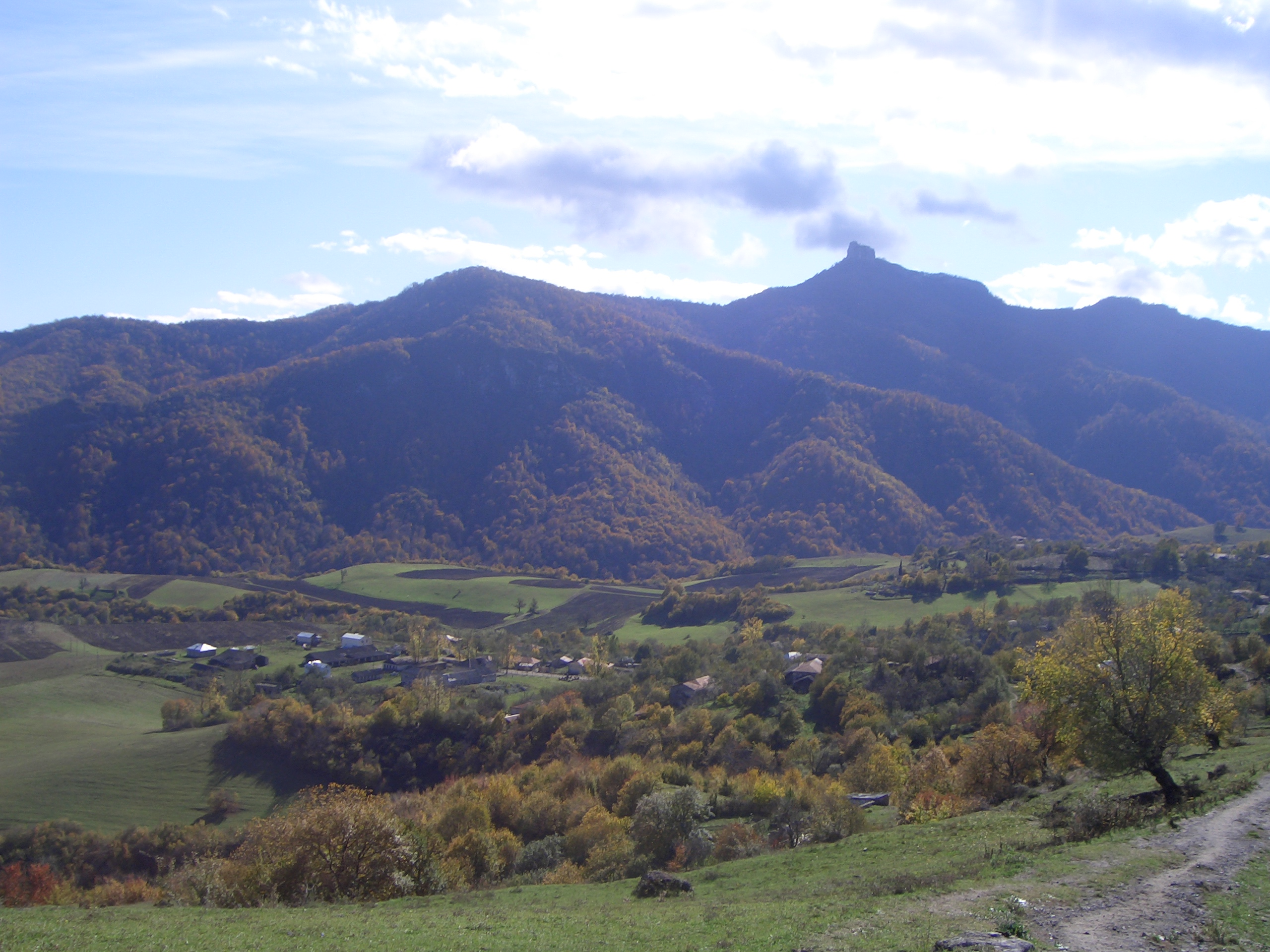
- A view of Kolatak

- Location within Azerbaijan Location within East Zangezur Economic Region
- Coordinates: 40°00′11″N 46°36′00″E
- Country: Azerbaijan
  - District: Aghdara

Population (2015)
  - Total: 250
- Time zone: UTC+4 (AZT)

Kolatak (Armenian: Քոլատակ; Azerbaijani: Kolatağ) is a village located in the Aghdara District of Azerbaijan, in the region of Nagorno-Karabakh. Until 2023 it was controlled by the breakaway Republic of Artsakh. The village had an ethnic Armenian-majority population until the expulsion of the Armenian population of Nagorno-Karabakh by Azerbaijan following the 2023 Azerbaijani offensive in Nagorno-Karabakh.

Situated on a mountain above the village is the Armenian monastery of Hakobavank, from between the 7th and 13th centuries.

== History ==
During the Soviet period, the village was a part of the Mardakert District of the Nagorno-Karabakh Autonomous Oblast.

== Historical heritage sites ==
Historical heritage sites in and around the village include the monastery of Hakobavank (Armenian: Հակոբավանք; also known as the monastery of Metsaranits, Մեծառանից) from between the 7th and 13th centuries, the fortress of Kachaghakaberd (Armenian: Կաչաղակաբերդ) in the mountains to the south - an important fortress in the medieval Armenian Principality of Khachen, the medieval fortress of Berdakar (Armenian: Բերդաքար), khachkars from between the 9th and 13th centuries, the church of Koshik Anapat (Armenian: Կոշիկ անապատ), the fortress of Isarantsots (Armenian: Իսարանցոց) and a cemetery from between the 12th and 13th centuries, a 13th-century church, the village of Alan Veran (Armenian: Ալան Վերան) and a cemetery from between the 16th and 18th centuries, the 17th-century Mandur Church (Armenian: Մանդուռի եկեղեցի, romanized: Manduri Yekeghetsi), the 17th/18th-century village of Hndzan (Armenian: Հնձան), a 19th-century oil mill, and a cave.

== Economy and culture ==
The population is mainly engaged in agriculture and animal husbandry. As of 2015, the village has a municipal building, a secondary school, and a medical centre.

== Demographics ==
The village had 273 inhabitants in 2005, and 250 inhabitants in 2015.

As of December 2025 the 33 Azerbaijani families, totaling 120 individuals, have been resettled in the village by Azerbaijan.

== Gallery ==
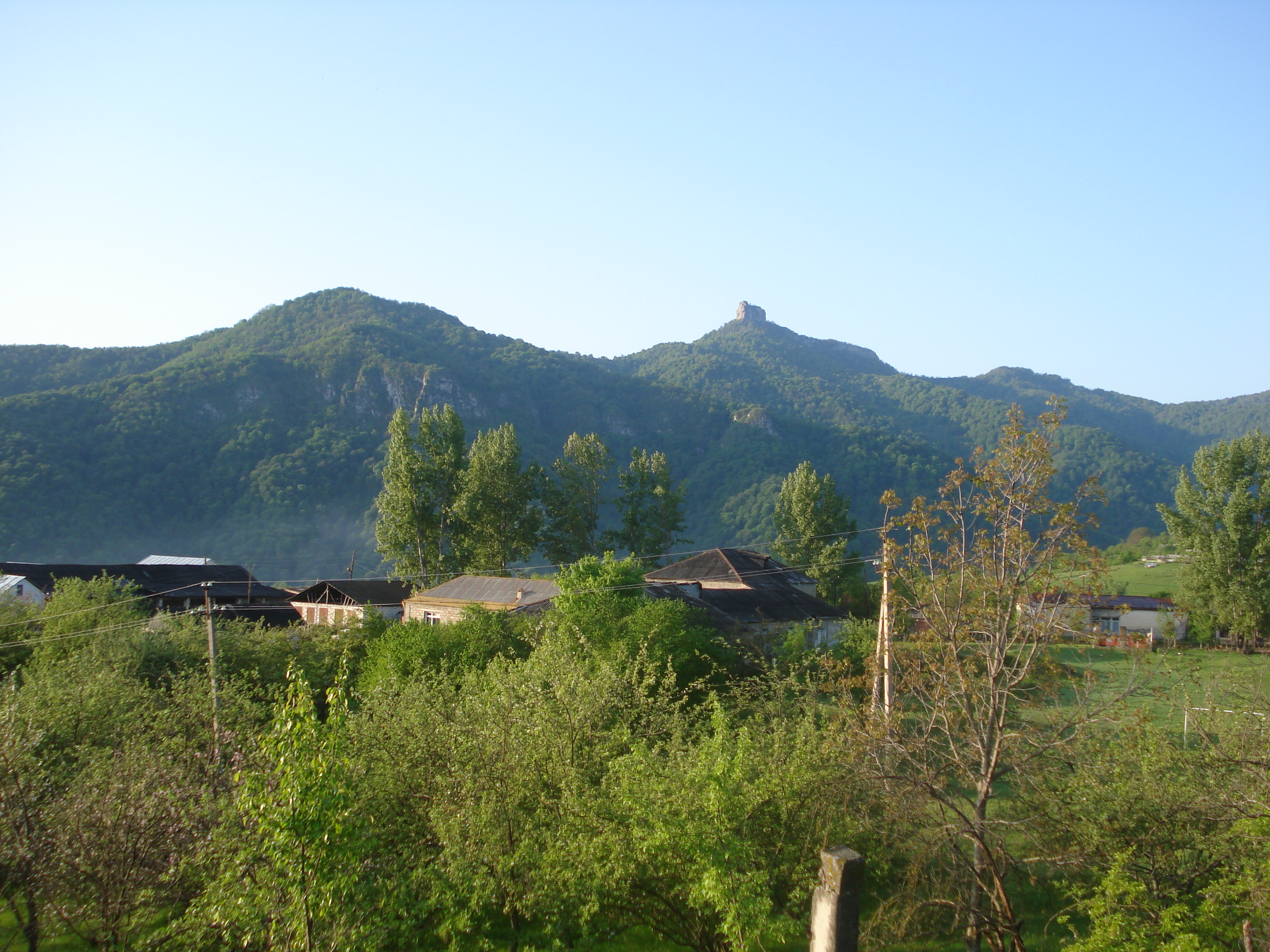
A view of the village

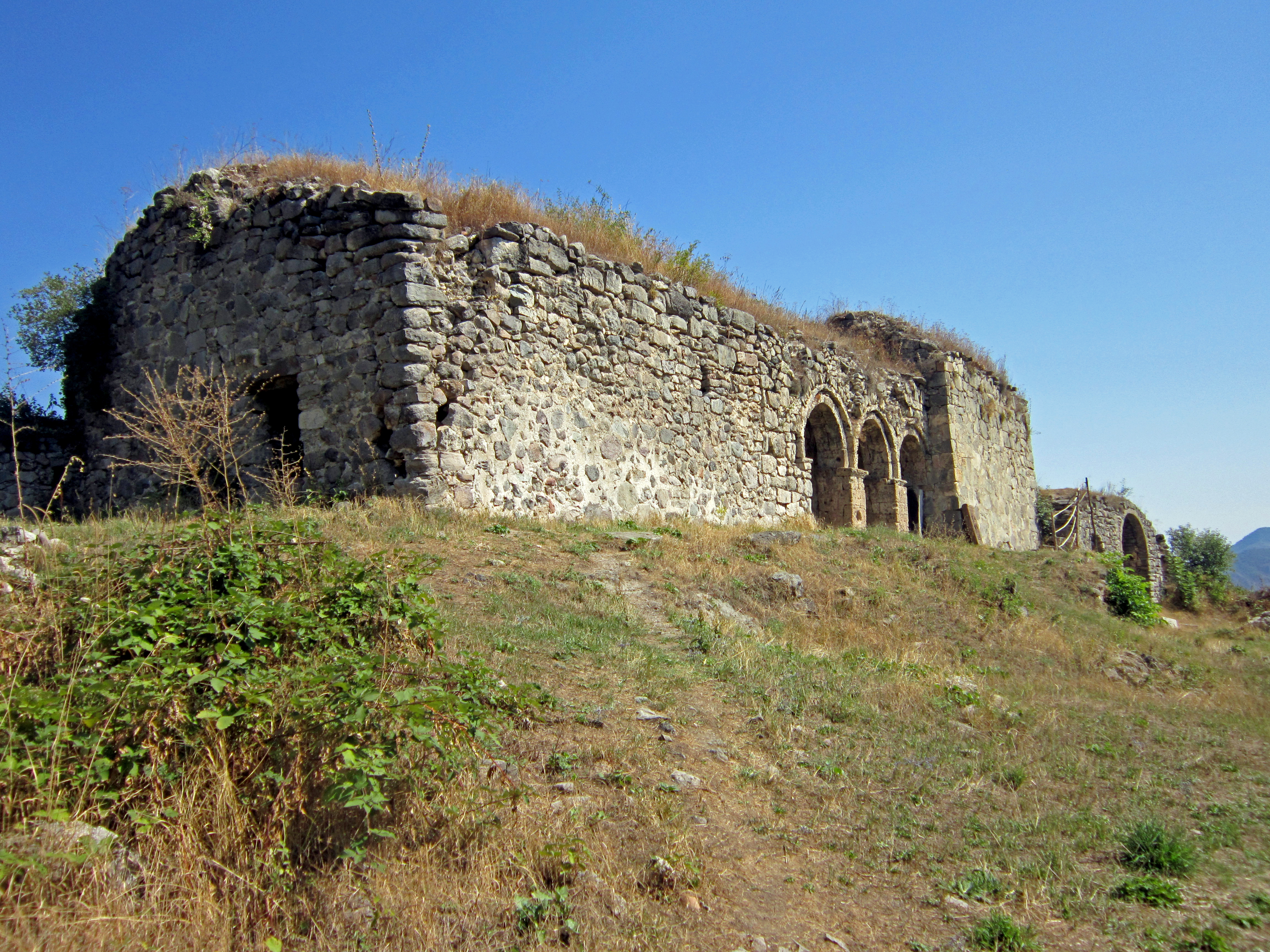
Hakobavank complex

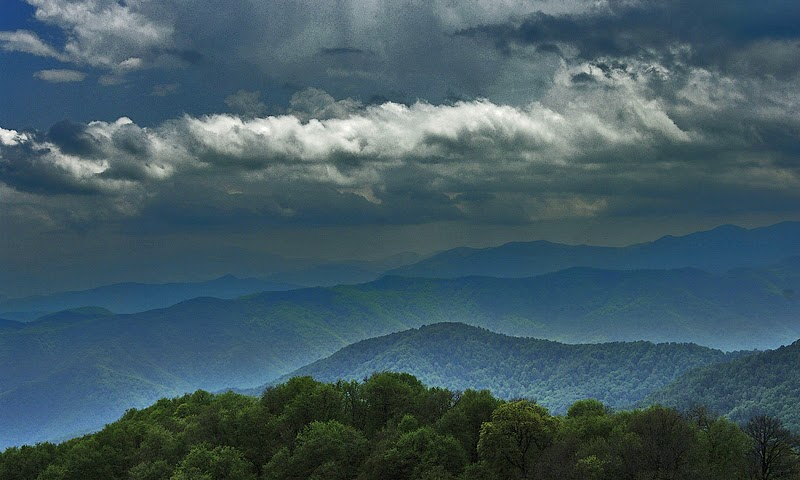
Scenery around Kolatak

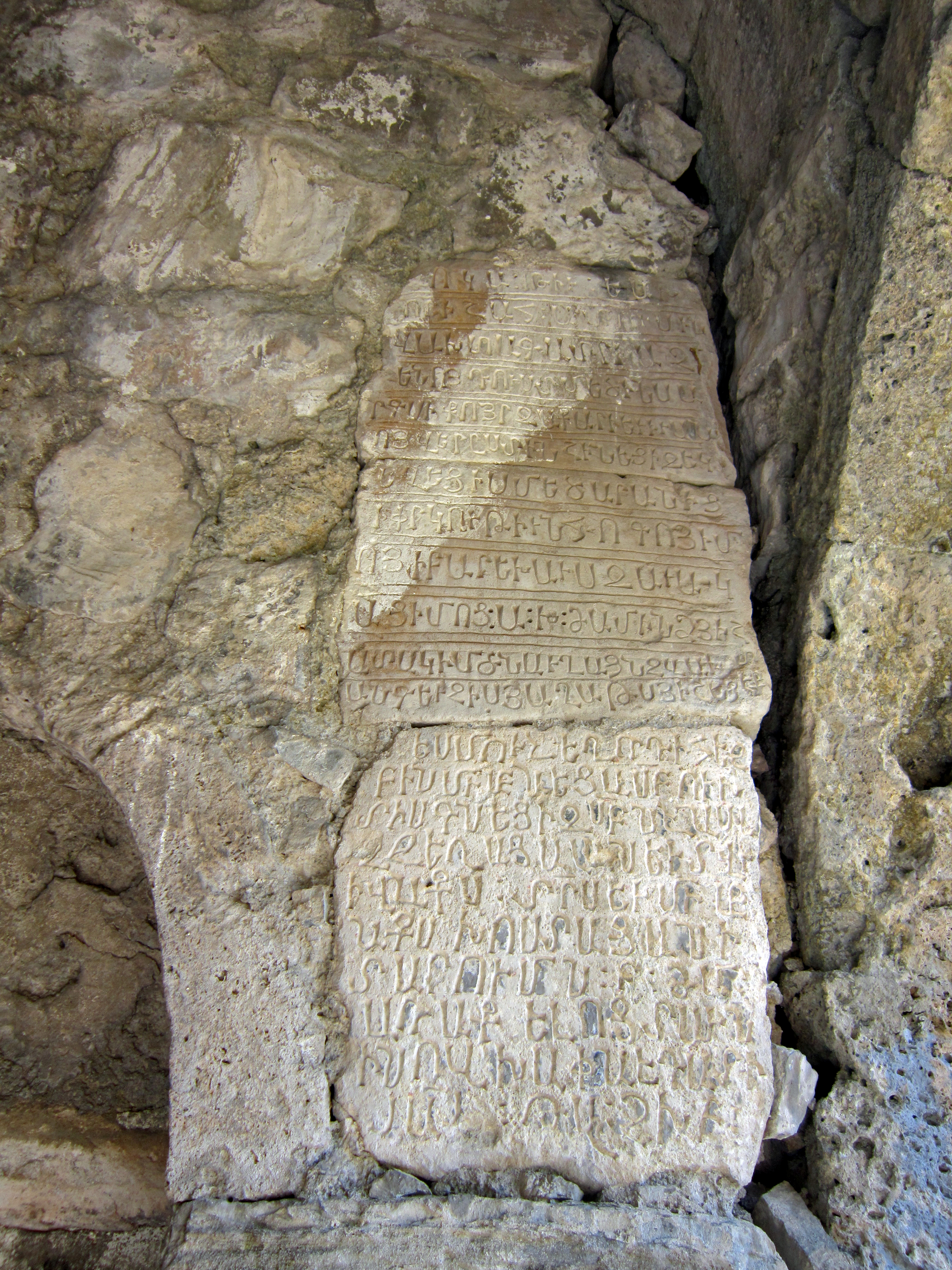
Armenian-language inscription in the monastery of Hakobavank

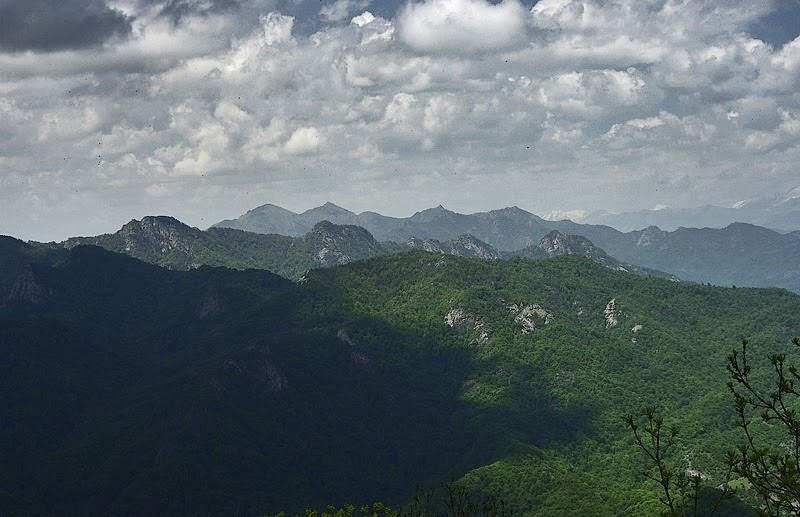
Mountains around Kolatak

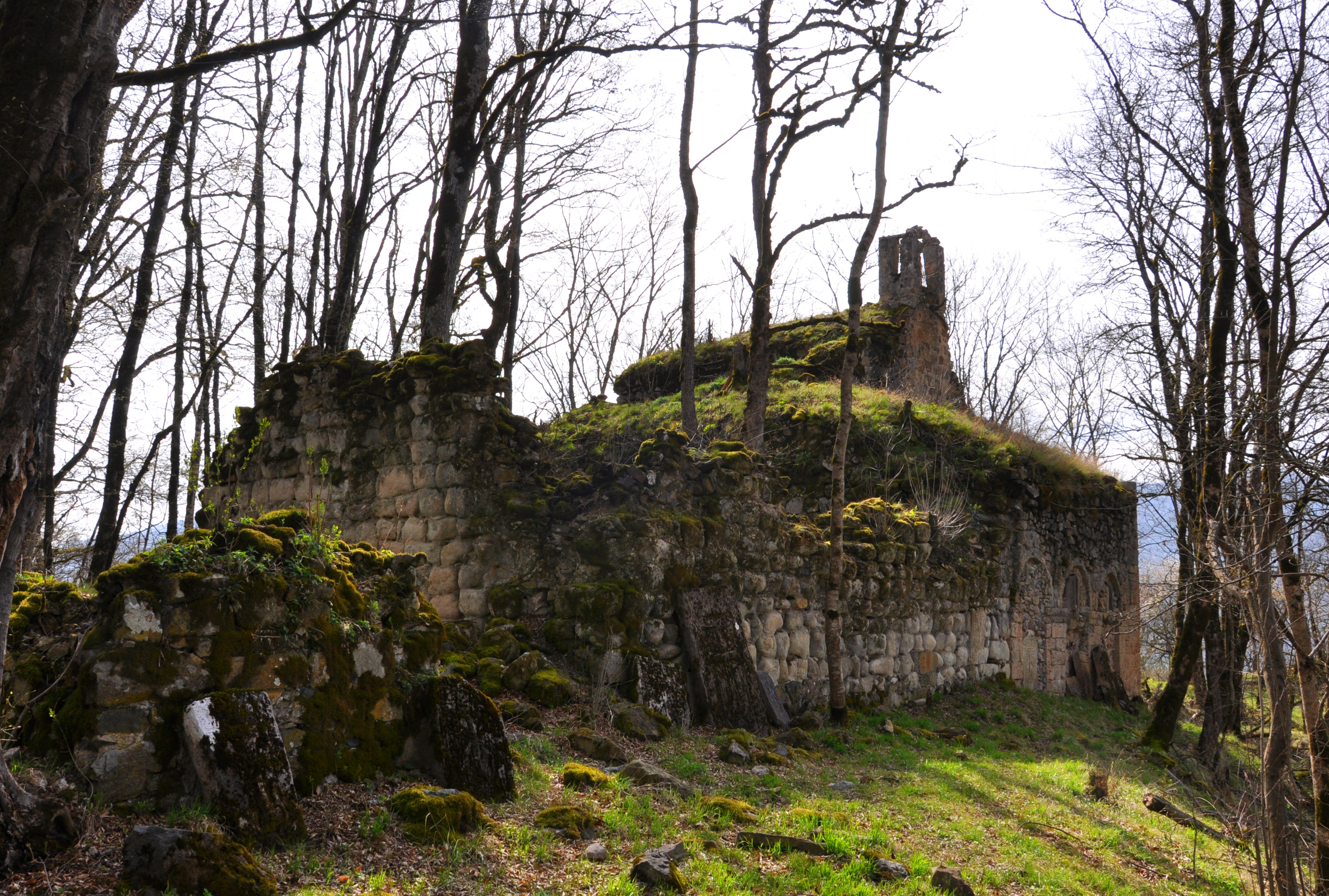
The 12th/13th-century Koshik Anapat Church
