= Siege of Khokhanaberd =

Siege in XIII century

- Part of Mongol invasions of Georgia and Armenia
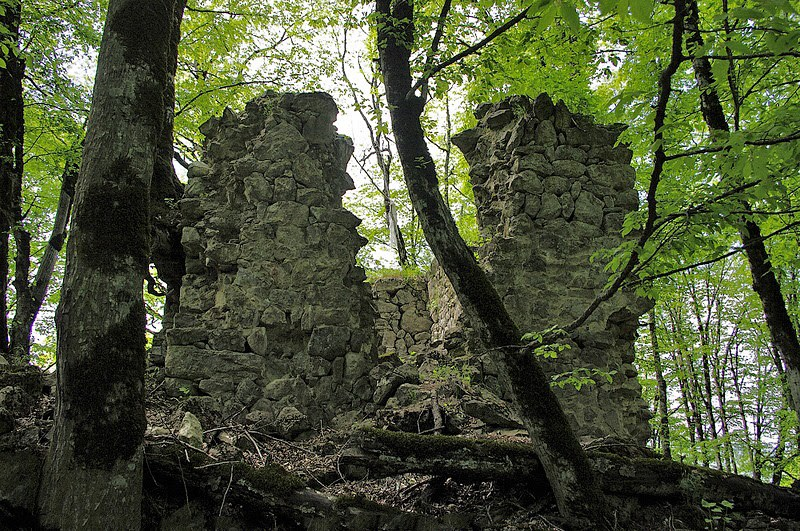
- Walls of Khokhanaberd
Date	1236
Location	Khokhanaberd, Kingdom of Artsakh (present-day Azerbaijan) 40.01599°N 46.53177°E
Result	Armenian diplomatic victory: Mongols fail to breach the castle; Artsakh is subject to the Mongol Empire and pays it tribute.

Combatants
Kingdom of Artsakh	Mongol Empire

Commanders and leaders
(Kingdom of Artsakh) Hasan-Jalal Dawla	Jula
- Location within Azerbaijan

The siege of Khokhanaberd (Note: (Armenian: Խոխանաբերդի պաշարում, romanized: Khokhanaberdi pasharum), Siege of Ishkanaberd (Armenian: Իշխանաբերդի պաշարում, romanized: Ishkhanaberdi pasharum) or Siege of Tarkhanaberd (Armenian: Թարխանաբերդի պաշարում, romanized: Tarkhanaberdi pasharum) was military conflict between Armenian and Mongol forces in 13th century during Mongol invasions of Georgia and Armenia.

== Background ==
In 1220, Mongols invaded Georgia. The same year they invaded Armenia under Zakarid dynasty.

After conquering the coastal regions of Lake Sevan and Syunik, another Mongol army led by Jughbugha Noyin set out to conquer Khachen.

The Mongol army led by the general Jughbugha invades Khachen (the mountainous part of Artsakh), where it encounters stubborn resistance. Moreover, unlike other regions, in Khachen the struggle was not concentrated in one fortress, which served as a hub, but rather numerous pockets of resistance were created. Part of the Armenians of Inner Khachen took refuge in the Havakhaghats fortress. Despite the stubborn resistance of the Khachens, the Mongols nevertheless managed to sneak into the fortress and overwhelm the defenders.The Mongols, in order to break the will of the Armenians of Artsakh, took revenge on the peaceful population in the most brutal and savage way. According to the testimony of Kirakos Gandzaketsi, they put part of the population of Havka-Akhrat (Havakhaghats) to the sword, and the rest were thrown from the fortress. Blood flowed like a river. After a long time, the bones of the unburied martyrs looked like piles of stones.

== Siege and aftermath ==
Then the Mongols moved on Hasan-Jalal, the ruler of Inner Khachen, who had fortified himself in the impregnable Khokhanaberd opposite Gandzasar. The Mongols could not capture the fortress for a long time. Seeing that it was impossible to capture it by fighting, they resorted to their already tried method: they called for obedience. The ruler of Inner Khachen, having no hope for help from outside and in order to save the country from unnecessary destruction and massacres, accepted the Mongols' offer.

When the Mongols came to besiege Ishkhanaberd, they saw that it was impossible to capture those fortresses, and they summoned him to them with peace and harmony. He wisely satisfied them. Then he himself went to them with many gifts. Honoring him, they handed over his land to him and enlarged it. They ordered him to go to war with them every year and remain loyally obedient to them

— Kirakos Gandzaketsi, History of Armenia, p. 193

Although Hasan-Jalal submitted to the Mongols, the conquest of the entire Khachen proceeded rather slowly, because the people stubbornly resisted. The struggle continued until 1238.
