= Khokhanaberd =

Fortress in Kalbajar District, Azerbaijan

- Խոխանաբերդ; Xanabert qalası
- near the village of Vank in Nagorno-Karabakh
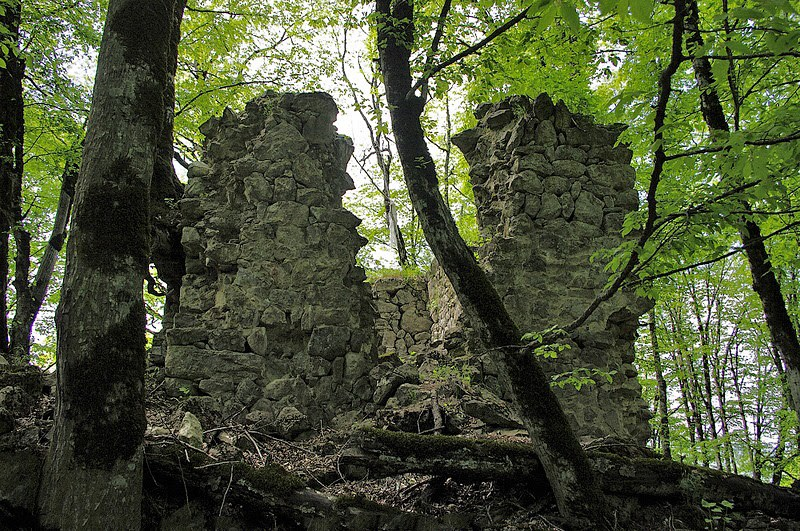
- Walls of Khokhanaberd

Site information
- Type: Castle

Location
- Coordinates: 40.01599°N 46.53177°E

Site history
- Built: 9th century

Khokhanaberd (Armenian: Խոխանաբերդ, Azerbaijani: Xoxanabert), also known as Khanabert (Azerbaijani: Xanabert qalası) and Tarkhanaberd (Armenian: Թարխանաբերդ), is a 9th-century mountaintop fortress near the village of Vank, in the disputed region of Nagorno-Karabakh, in the Kalbajar District of Azerbaijan. Historically a part of the Lower Khachen (Nerkin Khachen) province of the Armenian Principality of Khachen, it served as a castle and residence of several rulers of the House of Hasan-Jalalyan.

== Etymology ==
A local folk etymology holds that Hasan Jalal I Dawla, founder of the Hasan-Jalalyan dynasty, named it upon hearing news of his son's birth (in the local Karabakh dialect of Armenian, khokha means child).

The fortress has historically been referred to by various names besides Khokhanaberd, including Tarakhana, Khavanaberd, Khokh, Khoyakhan, and Havaptuk.

== History ==
The fortress is believed to have been constructed from the 7th to 9th centuries, during the period of Arab rule in Armenia. Historian Grigor Ter-Hovhannisyants attributes its construction to the Armenian ruler Sahl Smbatean. In the first half of the 13th century, Prince Hasan Jalal I Dawla of Khachen repaired and expanded the fortress. Khokhanaberd is first mentioned in the history of 13th-century Armenian historian Kirakos Gandzaketsi, who wrote that Hasan Jalal I fortified himself in the castle while under attack by the Mongol general Jula, brother of Chormaqan. Although Jula was unable to take the fortress, Hasan Jalal was forced to provide a yearly tribute and troops to the Mongols, as well as marry off his daughter Ruzan to Bora, Chormaqan's son. Despite this, after the succession of Güyük Khan to the Mongol throne in 1246, Bora returned to Khachen with an army to collect tribute and destroyed Khokhanaberd along with several other fortresses belonging to Hasan Jalal. The fortress suffered further damage during the campaigns of various Turkic invaders in Karabakh in the 15th and 16th centuries.

== Gallery ==
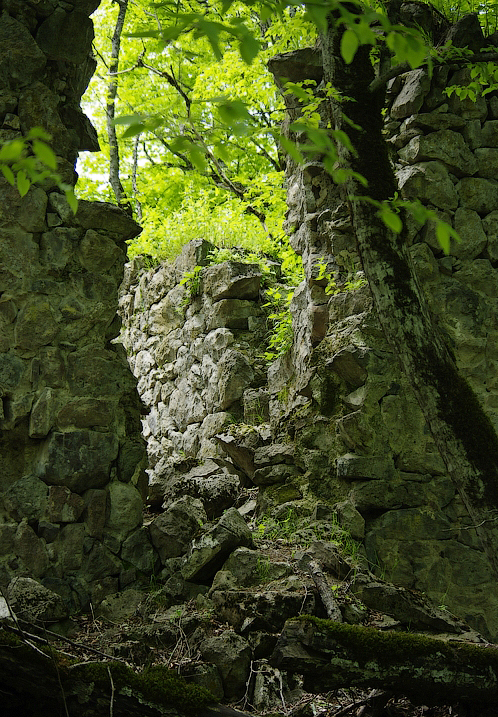
Walls of the palace

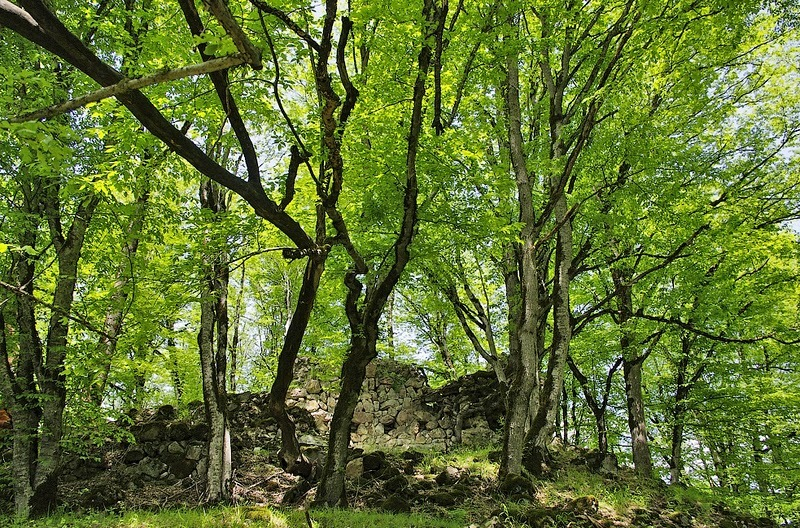
Remains of the fortress walls

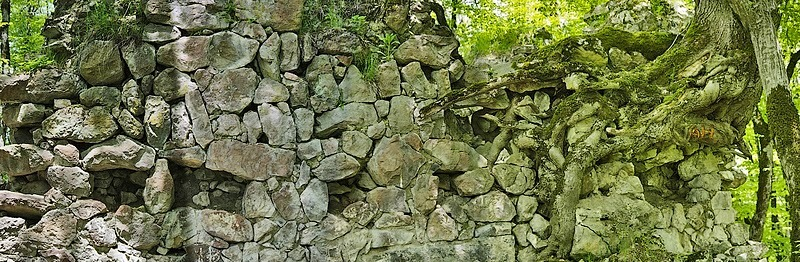
Remains of the fortress walls

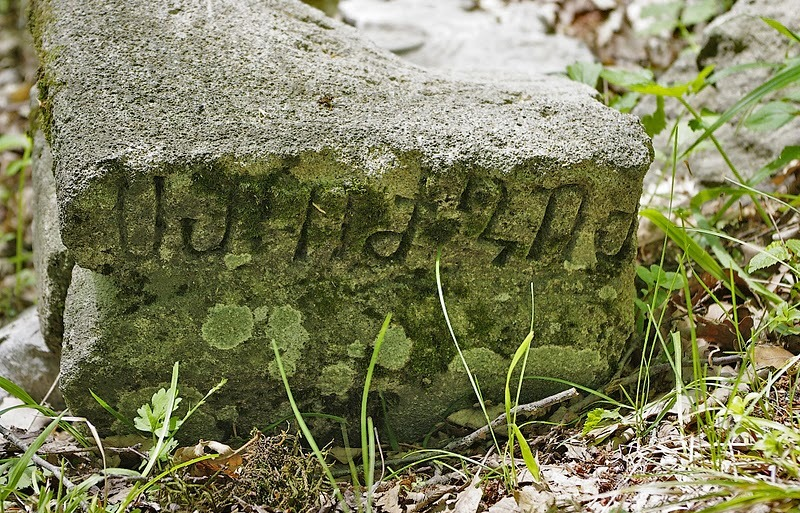
Fragment of an Armenian inscription from the wall
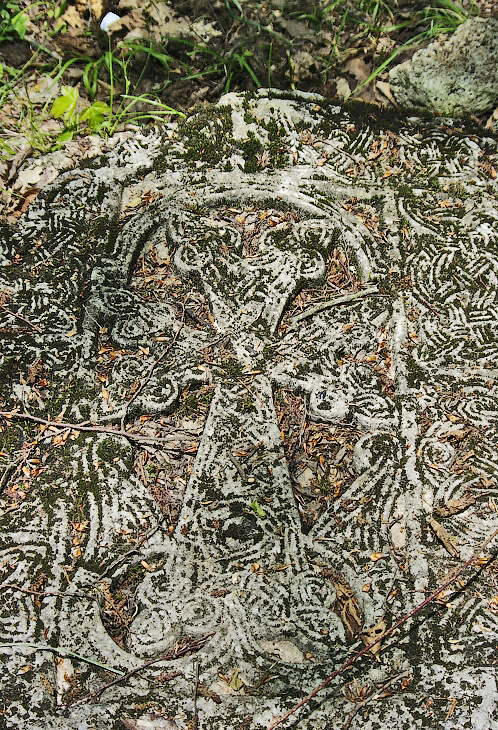
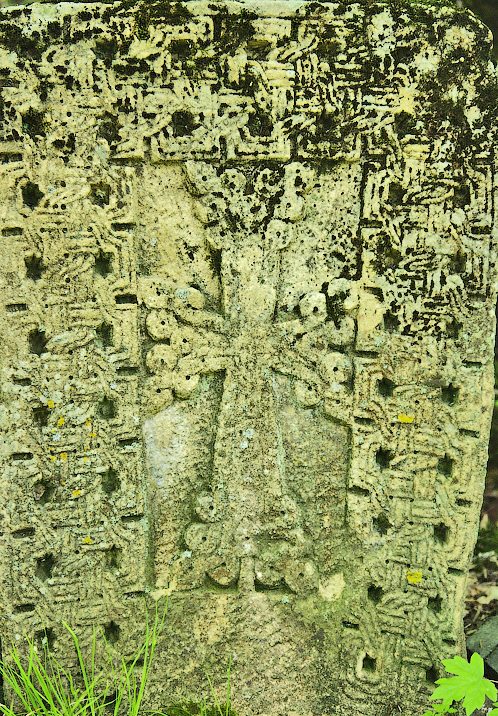
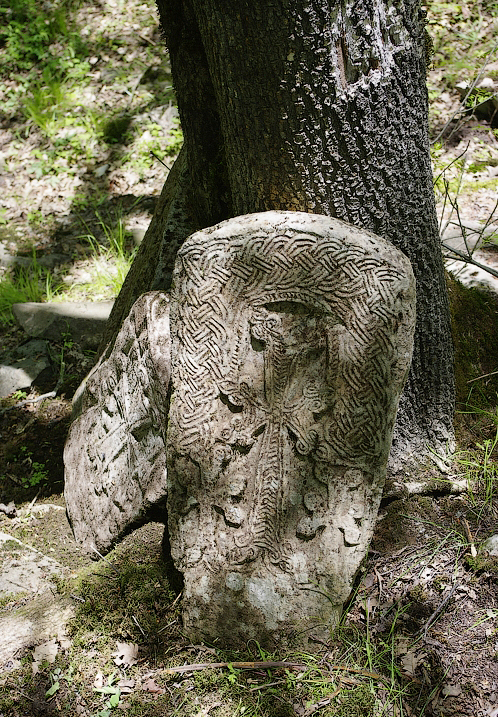
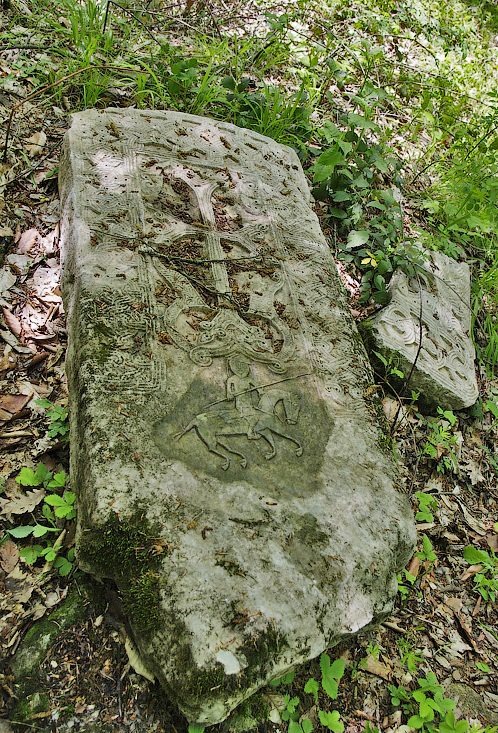
Khachkars from the palace
