= Vank, Nagorno-Karabakh =

Vank Վանք
- Vəngli
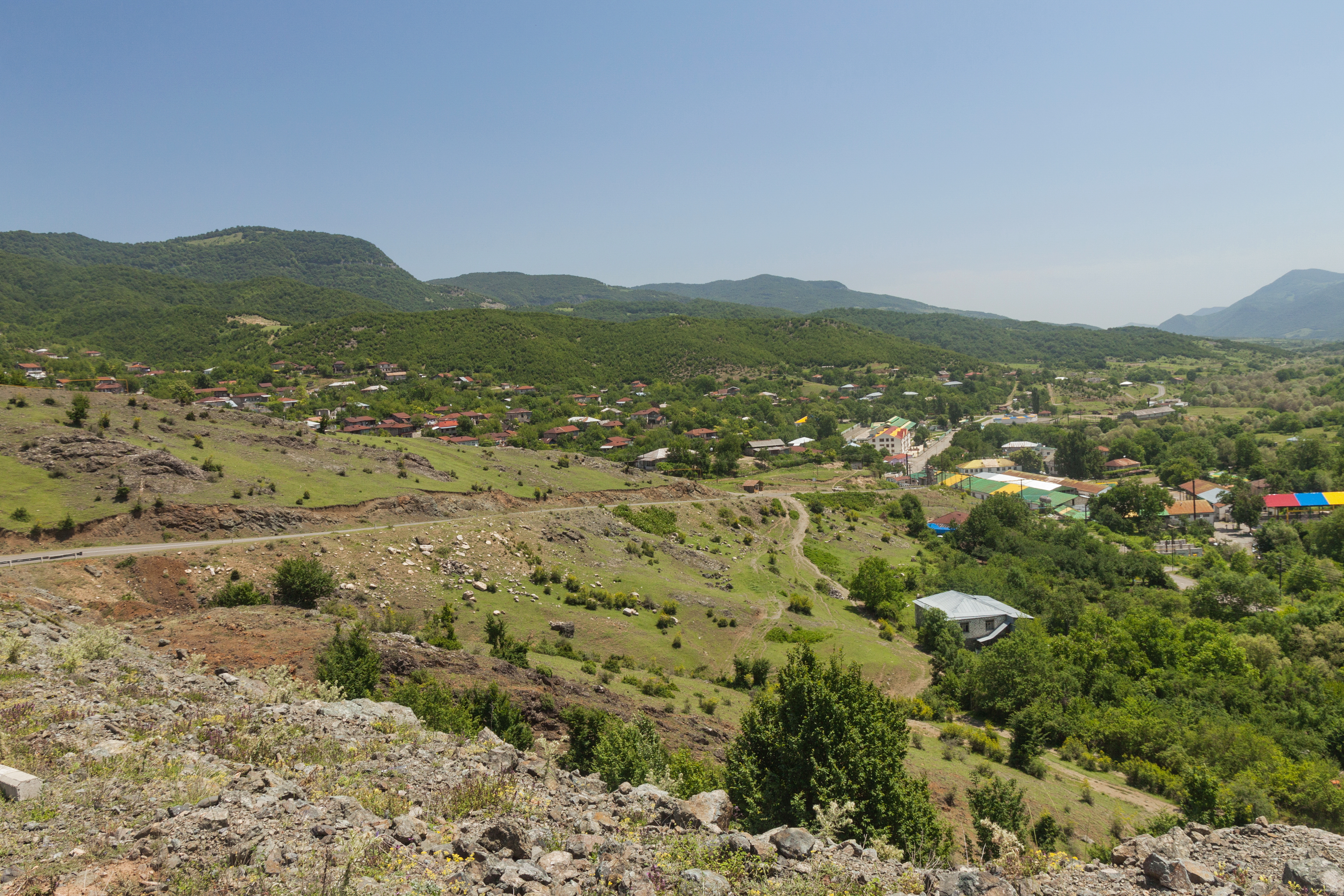
- View of the village from the road between Vank and Gandzasar Monastery

- Location within Azerbaijan Location within East Zangezur Economic Region
- Coordinates: 40°03′28″N 46°32′44″E
- Country: Azerbaijan
  - District: Aghdara
- Elevation: 1,031 m (3,383 ft)

Population (2015)
  - Total: 1,574
- Time zone: UTC+4 (AZT)

Vank (Armenian: Վանք) or Vangli (Azerbaijani: Vəngli) is a village in the Aghdara District of Azerbaijan, in the region of Nagorno-Karabakh. From 1991 to 2023 it was controlled by the breakaway Republic of Artsakh. The village had an ethnic Armenian-majority population until the expulsion of the Armenian population of Nagorno-Karabakh by Azerbaijan following the 2023 Azerbaijani offensive in Nagorno-Karabakh. The 13th-century Gandzasar Monastery, and the 9th-century Khokhanaberd fortress are located near Vank.

== History ==
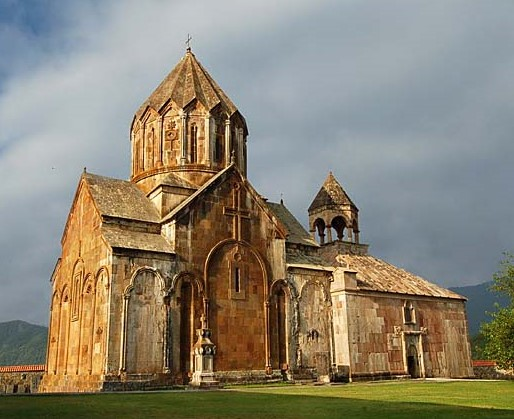
The 13th-century Gandzasar Monastery near Vank

The village of Vank (meaning monastery in Armenian) was founded in the 9th century, and was named as such for its proximity to Gandzasar Monastery. Although the current structure of Gandzasar was built in the 13th century, a church or monastery existed at the site several centuries before then. The village was previously also known by the name Vankashen.

The village is surrounded by several historical monuments dating to the Middle Ages. The most prominent among them is the thirteenth-century monastic complex of Gandzasar (built from 1216–38), which overlooks the village and was built by the Armenian ruler of the Principality of Khachen, Prince Hasan-Jalal Dawla. Khokhanaberd, a 9th-century mountaintop fortress is also located near Vank, which served as a castle and residence of rulers of the House of Hasan-Jalalyan.

During the Soviet period, the village was a part of the Mardakert District of the Nagorno-Karabakh Autonomous Oblast.

In the years following the conclusion of the First Nagorno-Karabakh War (1988-1994), the village has seen an increase in investment from the Armenian diaspora. Levon Hairapetyan, a Russian-based Armenian businessman and a native of Vank, has funded the reconstruction of homes, the local school, and sponsored the building of a zoo, and the nearby Hotel Eclectica, which resembles a ship. In October 2008, Vank was also one of several venues in Nagorno-Karabakh for a mass wedding of 560 Armenian couples.

== Historical heritage sites ==
Historical heritage sites in and around the village include the 12th-century church of Yeghtsun Khut (Armenian: Եղցուն Խութ), the 12th/13th-century monastery of Havaptuk (Armenian: Հավապտուկ), a 12th/13th-century cemetery, Gandzasar monastery (1216-1238), a 13th-century khachkar, a 13th-century village, and the medieval shrine of Yeghegyan Nahatak (Armenian: Եղեգյան Նահատակ).

== Economy and culture ==
The population is mainly engaged in agriculture and animal husbandry. As of 2015, the village has a municipal building, a house of culture, a secondary school, an art school, a kindergarten, 18 shops, two hotels, and a medical centre. The community of Vank includes the village of Nareshtar.

== Demographics ==
Vank had a population of 1,284 in 2005, and 1,574 inhabitants in 2015.

As of December 2025, 134 Azerbaijani families, totaling 544 individuals, have been resettled in the Vangli village by Azerbaijan.

== Gallery ==
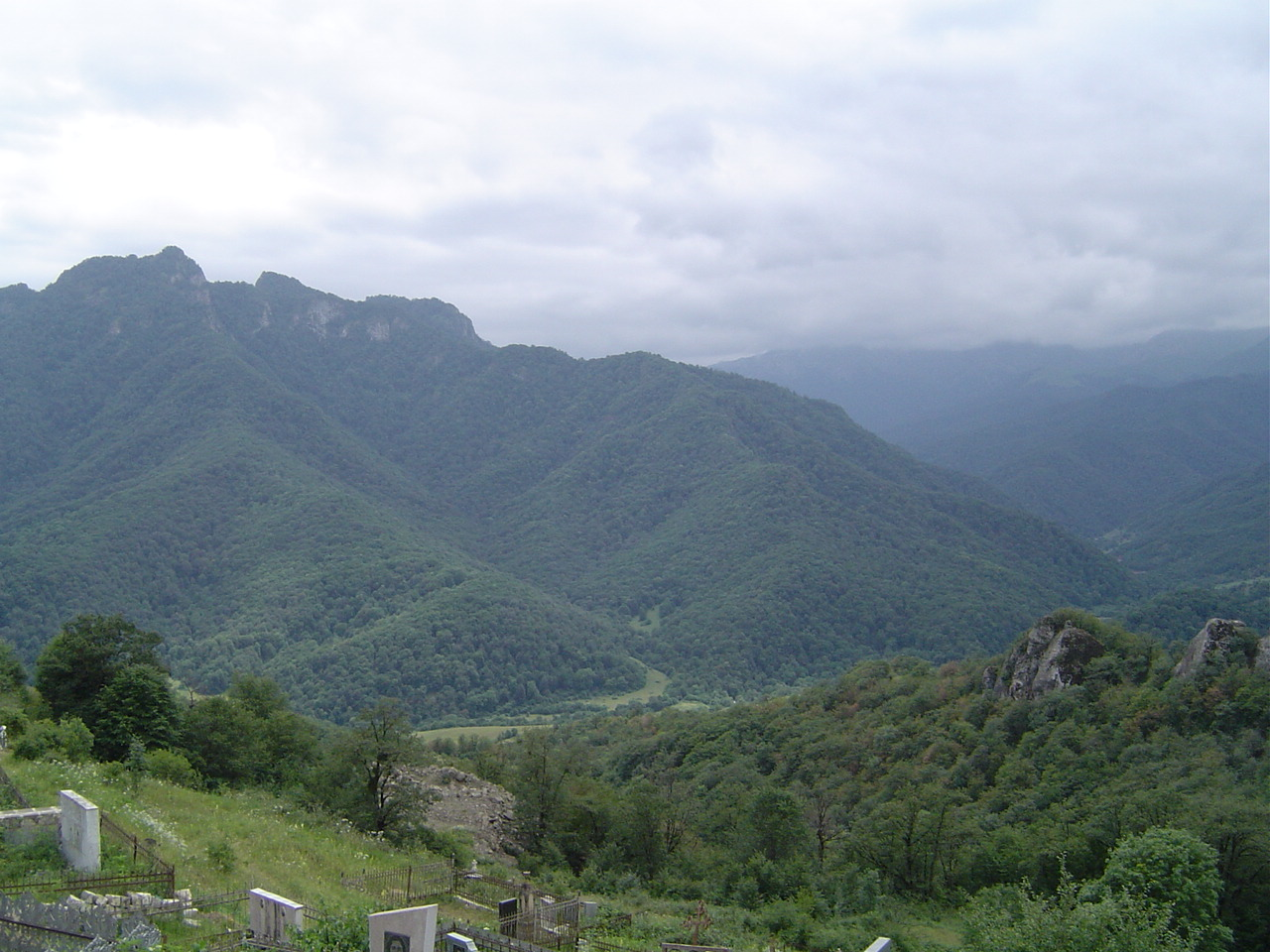
The remains of Prince Hasan-Jalal's fortress of Khokhanaberd (on left), as seen from Gandzasar

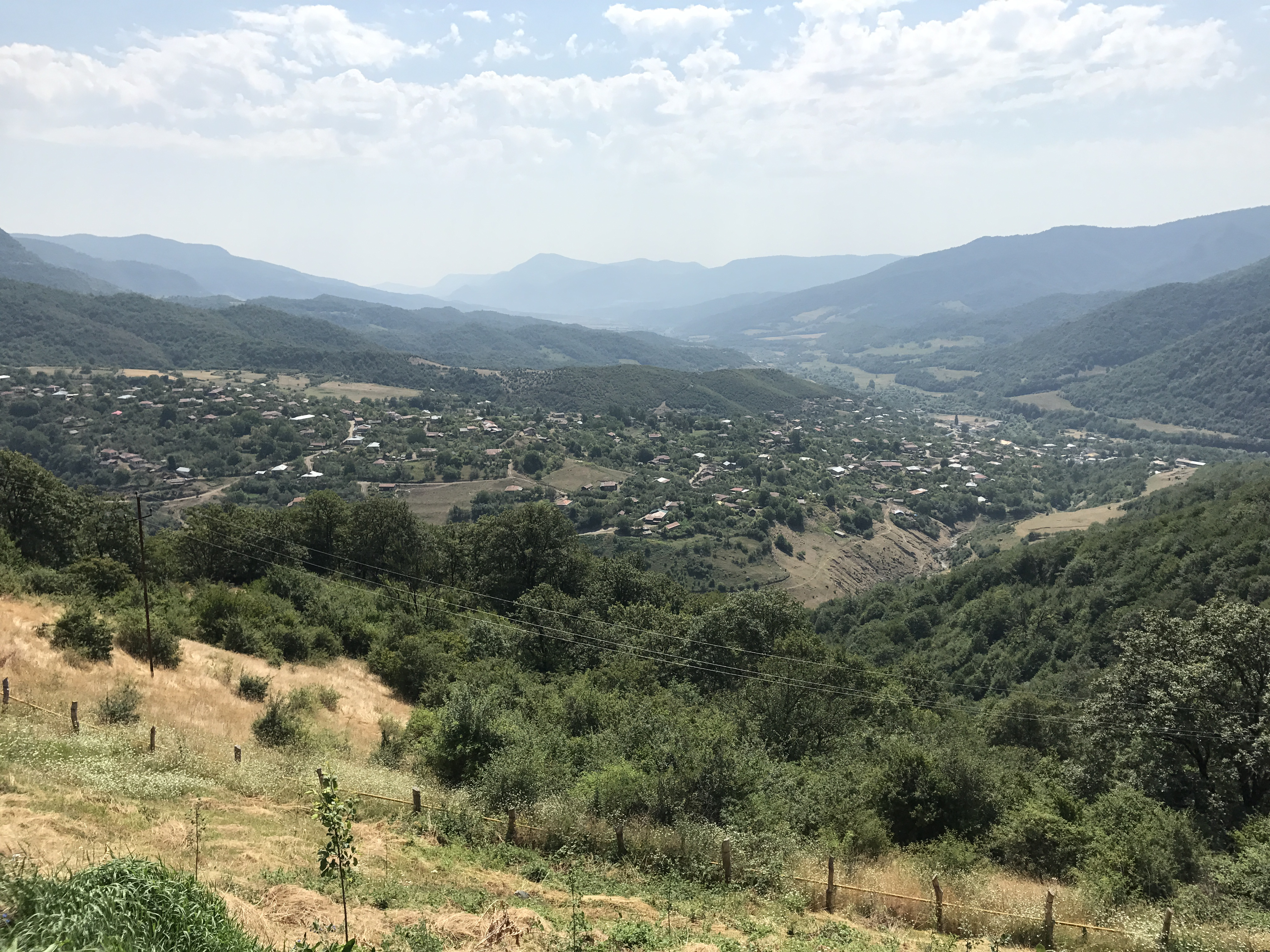
Vank as seen from Gandzasar Monastery

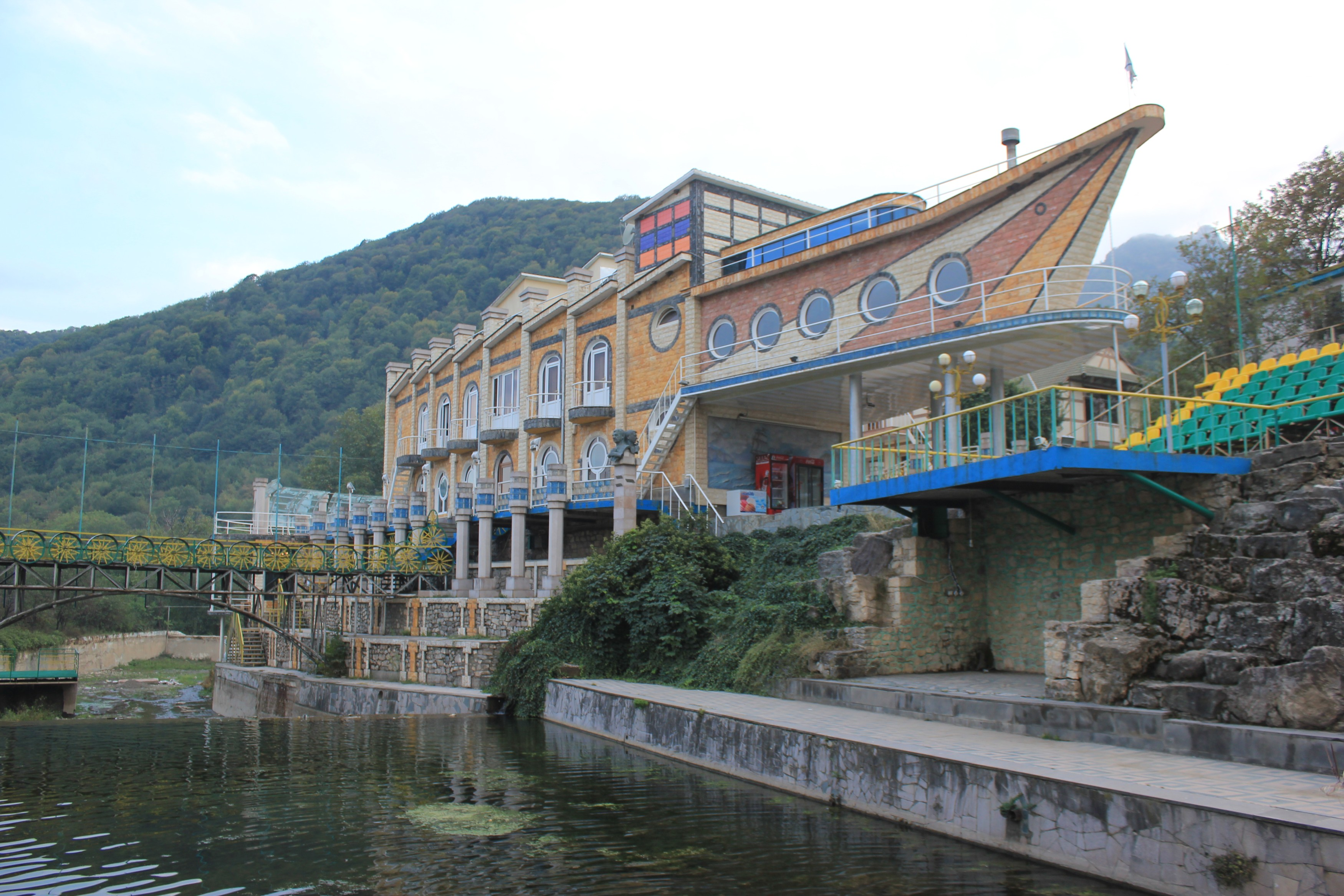
Hotel Eclectica in Vank

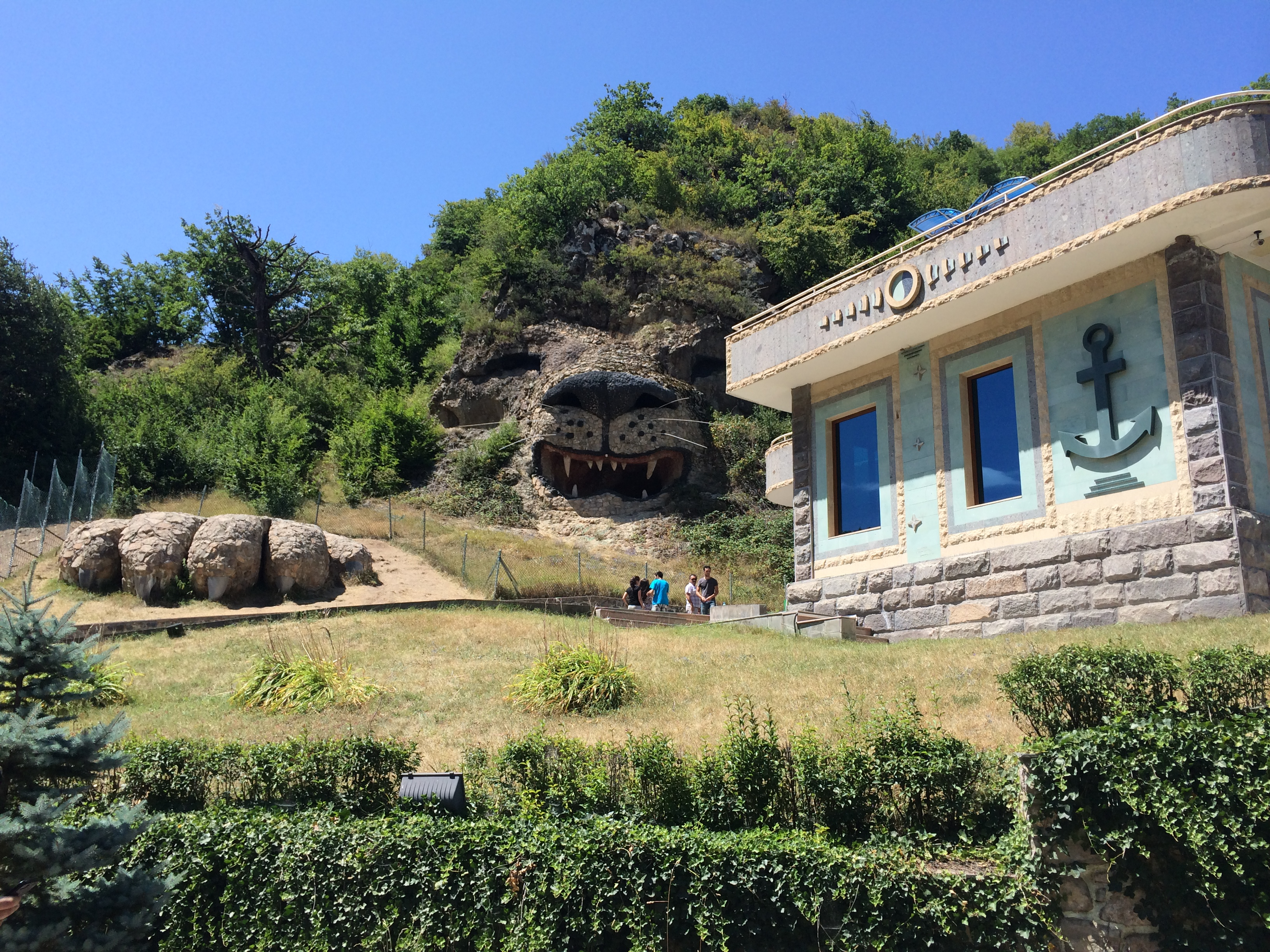
Lion of Vank

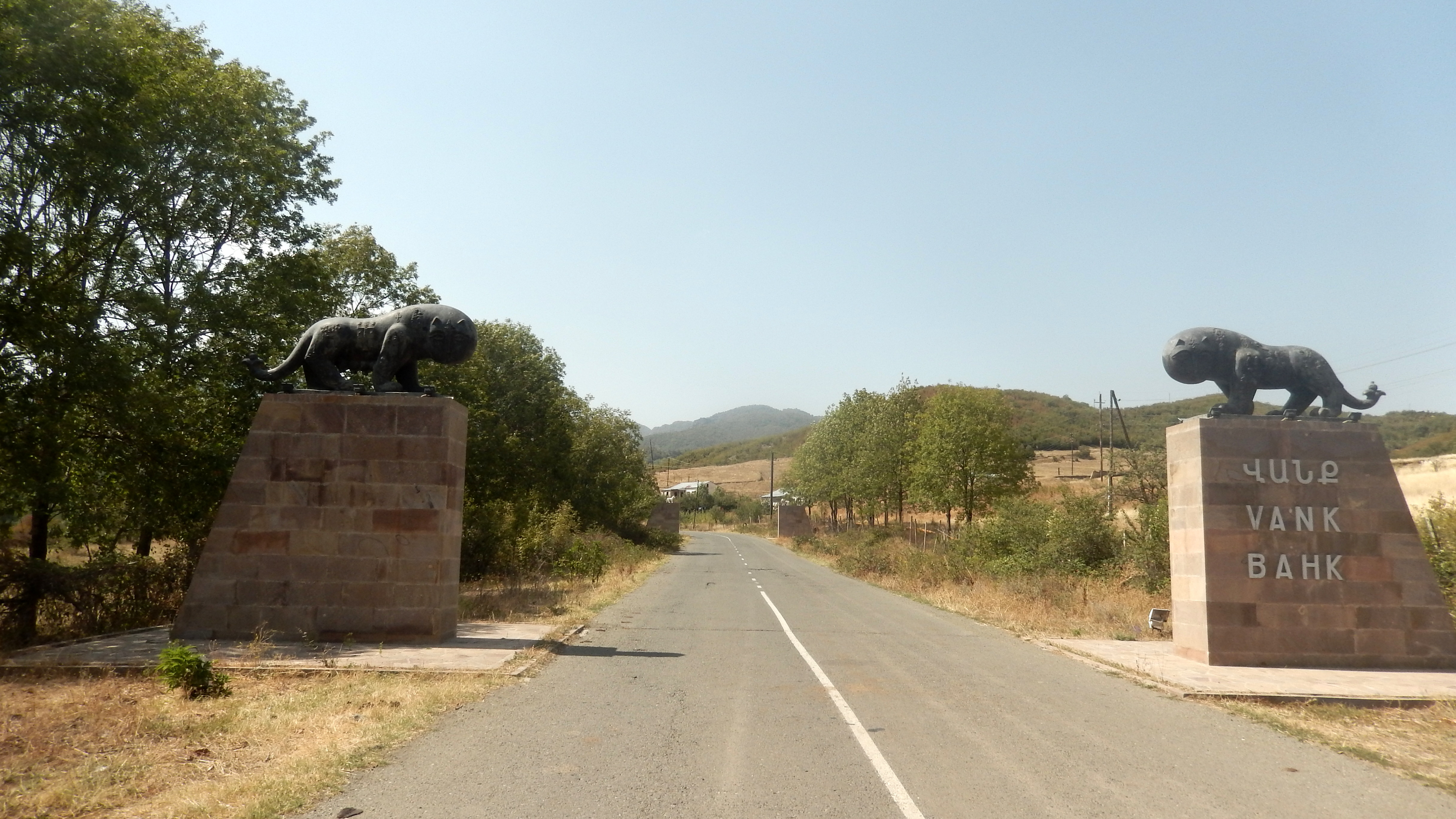
Entrance to the village

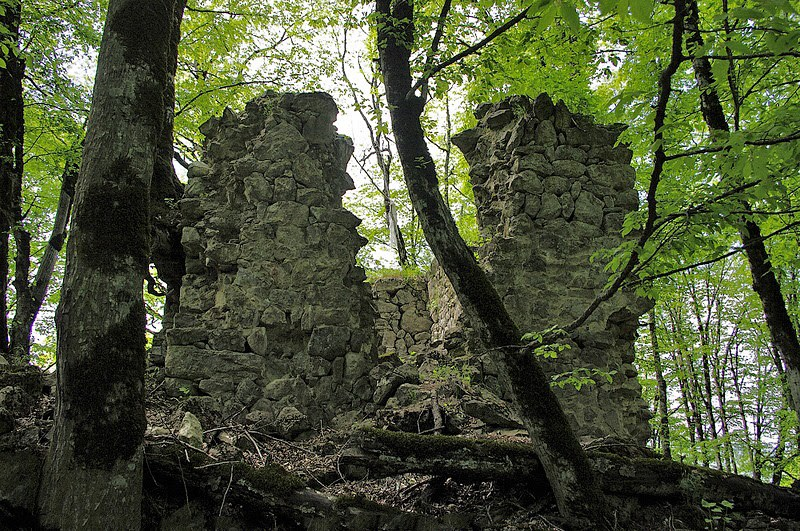
Walls of Khokhanaberd, close by are the ruins of the monastery of Havaptuk

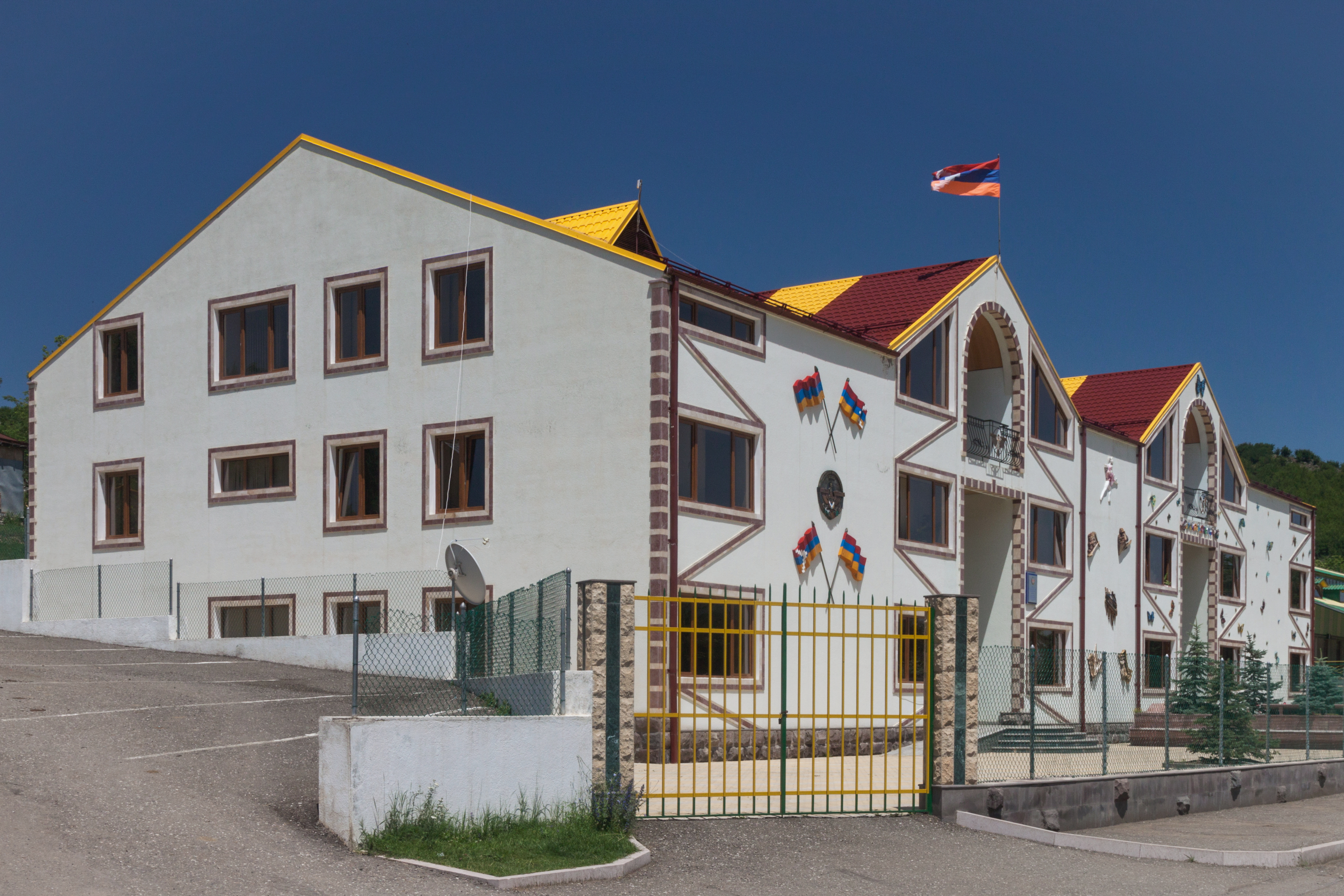
School in Vank
