= Havaptuk monastery =

Armenian medieval monastery

Havaptuk Monastery
- Հավապտուկ վանք; Հավոցպտուկ
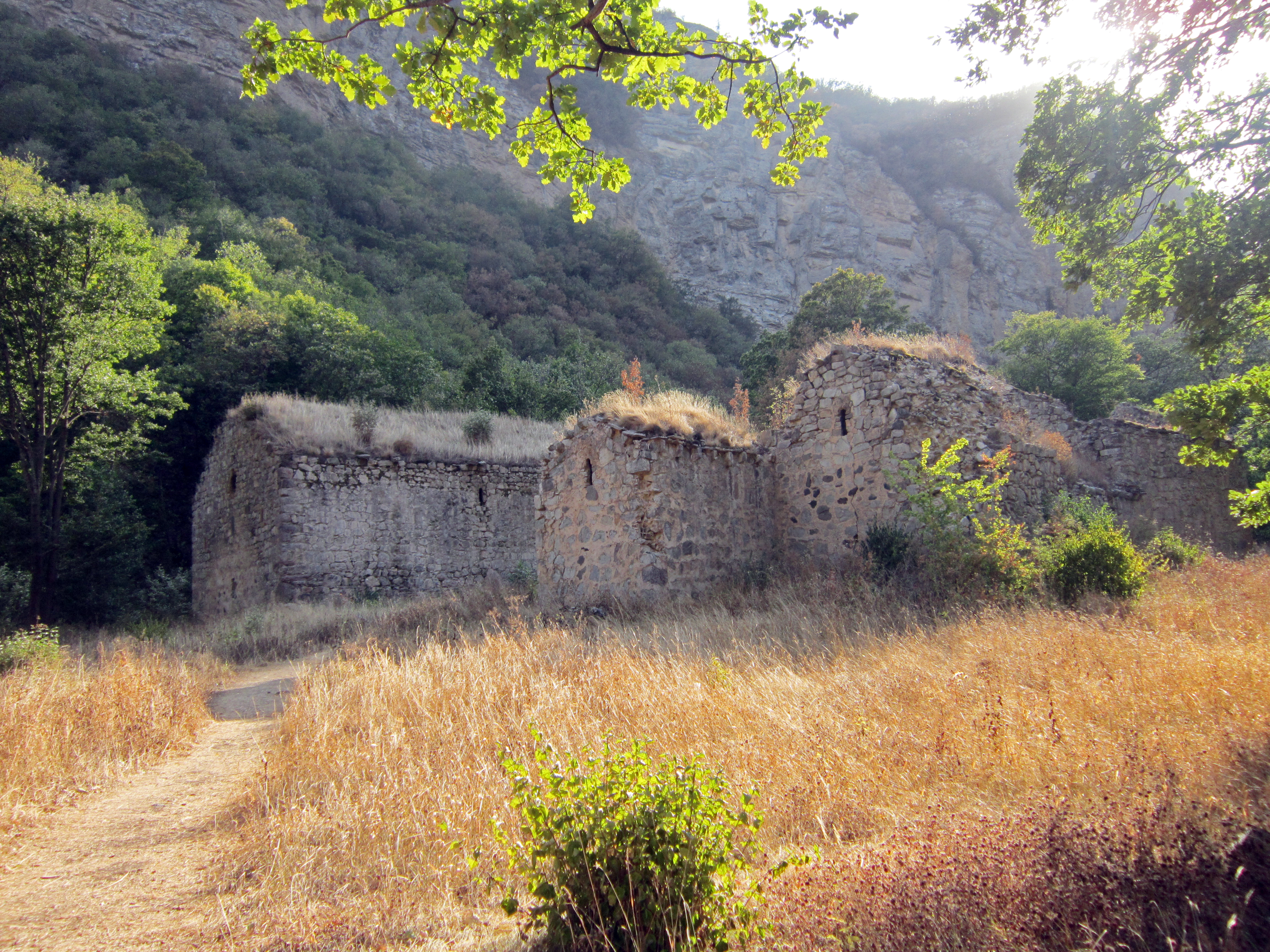
- Gandzasar monastery

- Location within Azerbaijan

Religion
- Affiliation: Armenian Apostolic Church
- Region: Kalbajar District

Location
- Location: 5 km from the village of Vank, Nagorno-Karabakh
- Country: Azerbaijan
- Interactive map of Havaptuk Monastery
- Coordinates: 40.0343°N 46.5488°E

Architecture
- Type: Monastery
- Style: Armenian
- Established: 1163
- Completed: 1233

Havaptuk Monastery (Armenian: Հավապտուկ վանք), also known as Havotsptuk (Armenian: Հավոցպտուկ), is a medieval Armenian monastery, which is situated near the village of Vank, in the region of Nagorno-Karabakh, Azerbaijan.

The monastery complex consists of a small church, a narthex and a small church. In addition to these buildings, there are also the remains of other structures. There are two cemeteries near the monastery.

== Inscriptions ==
According to the inscriptions, the church was built in 1163 and rebuilt in 1223. At the entrance to the main church of the monastery, the following inscription in Armenian has been preserved:

In the summer of 612 (1163), under the principality of Hassan, the son of Vakhtang and his wife Mamkan, I, John, son of the sister of Gregory and Georg, the son of (my) brother and other brothers, built churches to save our souls and in memory of our parents...

According to another inscription, the church was restored in 1223 under the principality of Hasan-Jalal Dawla.

In June 2016, during the scientific expedition in the Republic of Artsakh, new epigraphic inscriptions were discovered on many monuments, including in the Havaptuk monastery.

== Literature ==
- Mkrtchyan, Shahen (1989). Историко-архитектурные памятники Нагорного Карабаха [Historical and architectural monuments of Nagorno-Karabakh] (in Russian). Parkebarakn. p. 360. ISBN 5-540-00402-7.
