= Haterk =

Haterk Հաթերք
- Həsənriz
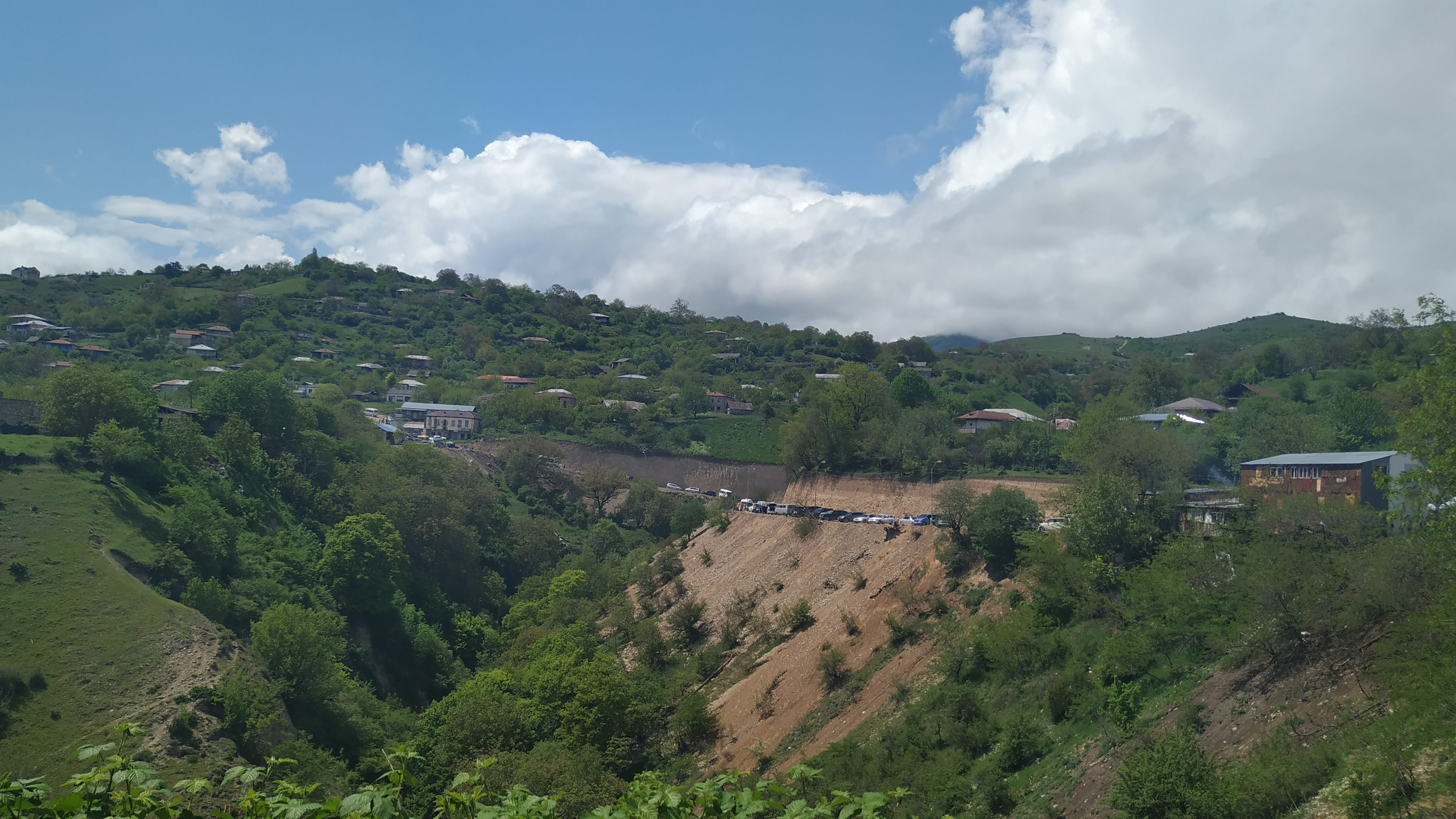

- Location within Azerbaijan Location within East Zangezur Economic Region
- Coordinates: 40°10′04″N 46°31′04″E
- Country: Azerbaijan
  - District: Aghdara
- Elevation: 1,120 m (3,670 ft)

Population (2026)
  - Total: 2,718
- Time zone: UTC+4 (AZT)

Haterk (Armenian: Հաթերք) or Hasanriz (Azerbaijani: Həsənriz) is a village located in the region of Nagorno-Karabakh, in the Aghdara District of Azerbaijan. Until 2023 it was controlled by the breakaway Republic of Artsakh. The village had an ethnic Armenian-majority population until the expulsion of the Armenian population of Nagorno-Karabakh by Azerbaijan following the 2023 Azerbaijani offensive in Nagorno-Karabakh.

== History ==
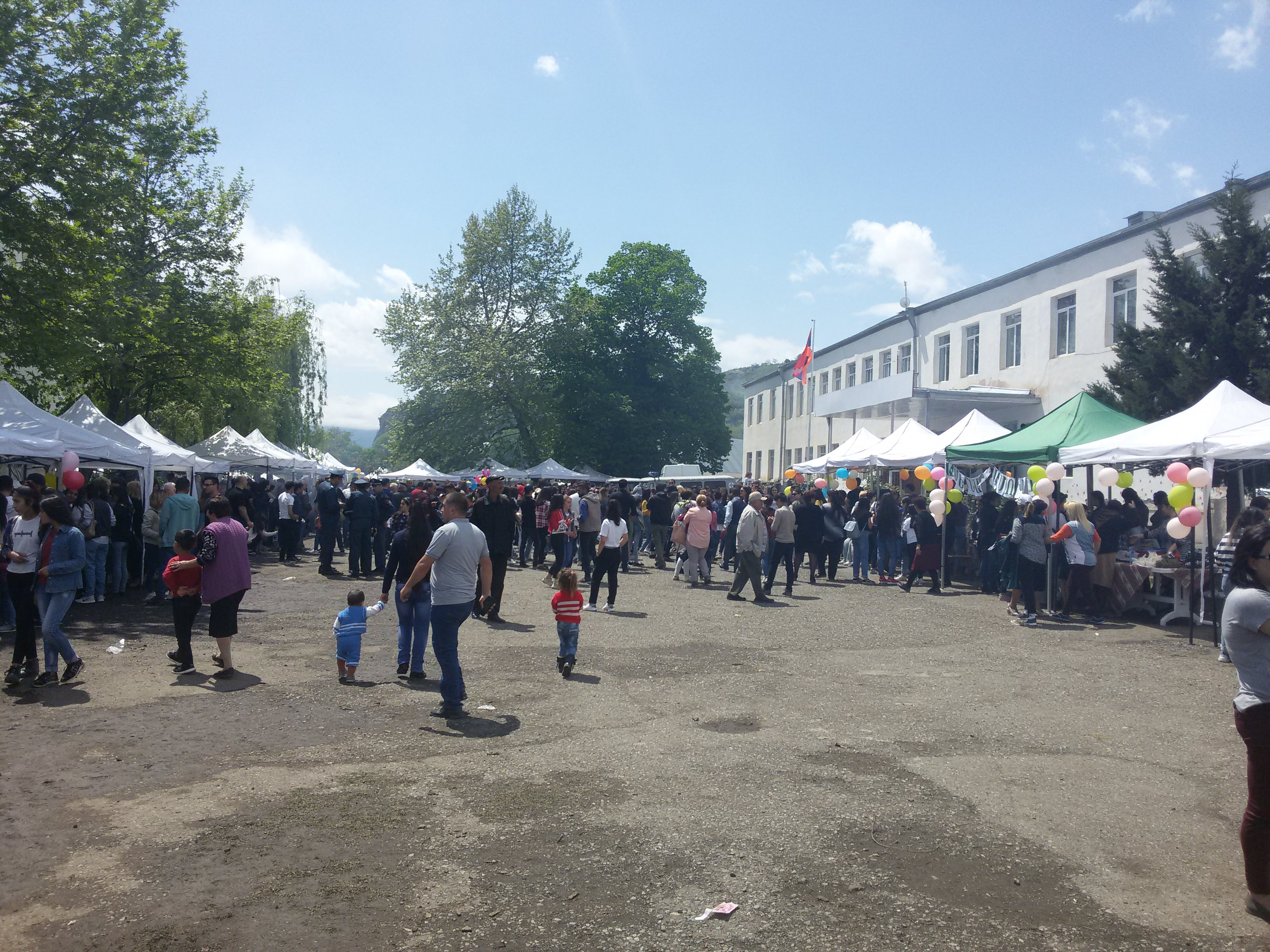
Zhingyalov hats festival in Haterk

During the period of Zakarid Armenia, at end of the 12th century, the Armenian principalities of the region consisted of the three branches of Khachen: Tsar, Haterk and Khokhanaberd (with their spiritual center at Gandzasar) along with the Khaghbakian family in northern Syunik (Vayots Dzor). The Armenian princes of Haterk (Upper Khachen) were established on the left bank of the Tartar River, with their spiritual center being at Dadivank, the principal church of which was established by Arzu-Khatun, the wife of Vakhtang of Haterk. Prince Hasan of Haterk left an inscription at Dadivank in 1182. The leading family among the three Khachen princes was the one from Haterk. Vakhtang of Haterk contributed in 1191 to the building of the Nor Getik monastery (present day Goshavank in northeastern Armenia). In the 15th century, Artsakh was subjugated by the Turkmen tribes of Qara Qoyunlu and Aq Qoyunlu, and Haterk was destroyed. Its inhabitants founded the modern village close to the original settlement in the 16th century. In 1603, the Persians established a protectorate over the Melikdoms of Karabakh and sponsored the establishment of a local khanate in 1750.

During the Soviet period, Haterk was a part of the Mardakert District in the Nagorno-Karabakh Autonomous Oblast of the Azerbaijan SSR. Haterk came under the control of Armenian forces during the First Nagorno-Karabakh War and subsequently became part of the Martakert Province of the Republic of Artsakh. After the 2020 Nagorno-Karabakh war, 157 displaced people settled in the village.

== Historical heritage sites ==
Haterk can be divided into three historical parts, Shen or Pap – the village center, Kyok and Mtghaser. There are several historical and cultural heritage sites in and around Haterk, including the ruined St. Nshan Church (Սուրբ Նշան եկեղեցի, Surb Nshan Yekeghetsi), the chapel of Astghablur (Աստղաբլուր) and an oil mill from the Middle Ages, the monastery of Mesis (Մեսիս), the ruined village of Khotorashen (Խոտորաշեն), a chapel-tomb and khachkars from between the 12th and 13th centuries, a 19th/20th-century fortress, and the 19th-century church of Surb Astvatsatsin (Սուրբ Աստվածածին, lit. 'Holy Mother of God') in the center of Haterk, the only one of the three churches in Haterk that still stands.

== Economy and culture ==
The population is mainly engaged in agriculture and animal husbandry. As of 2015, the village has a municipal building, a house of culture, a medical centre, a secondary school, a kindergarten, and 19 shops. The village hosts a yearly Zhingyalov hats festival since 2018.

== Demographics ==
Haterk had 1,531 inhabitants in 2005, and 1,638 inhabitants in 2015. The population of the village was estimated to be 1,800 inhabitants in 2021.

As of January 2026, 724 Azerbaijani families, comprising 2718 people, have been resettled in the Hasanriz village by Azerbaijan.

== Gallery ==
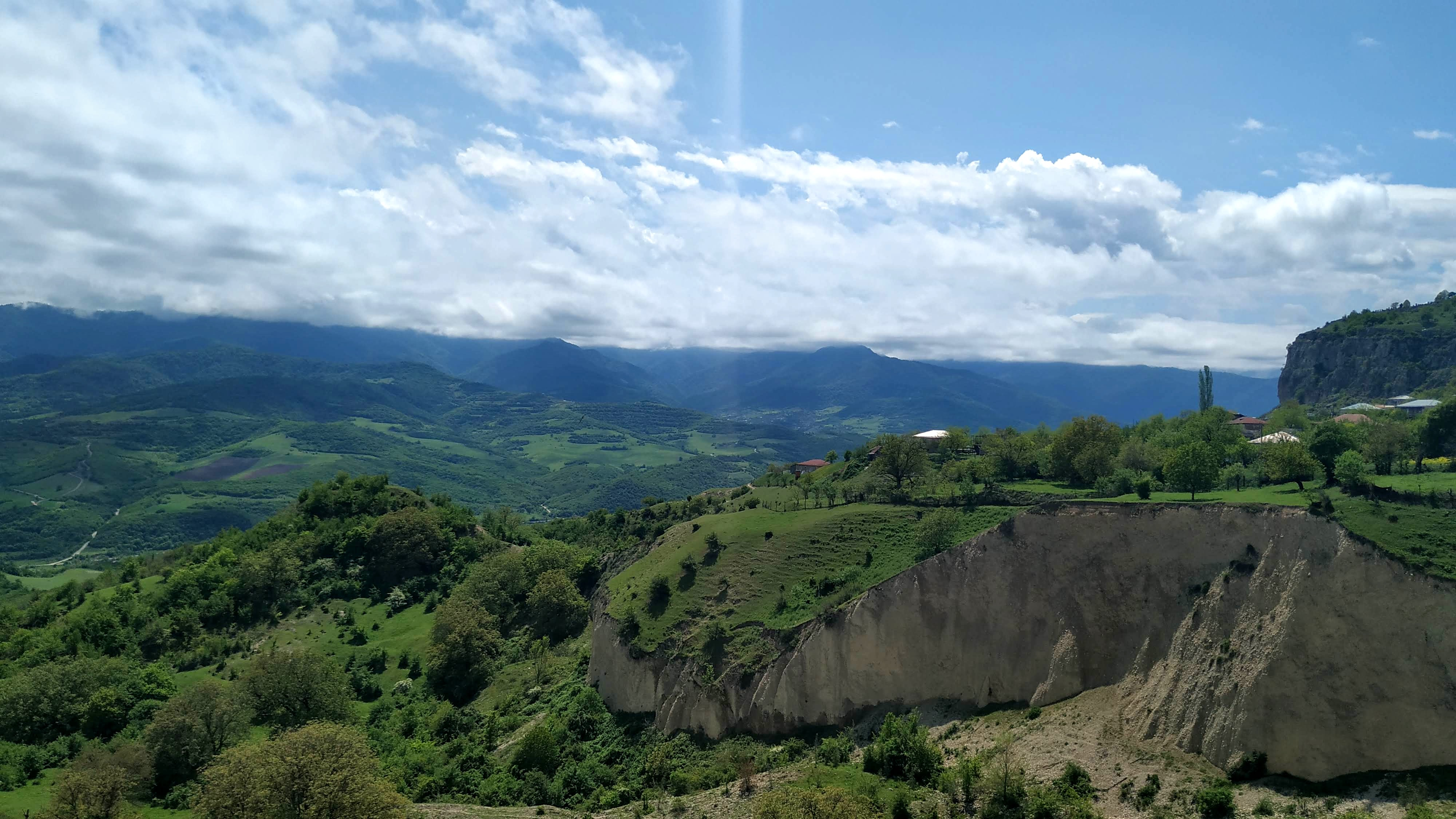

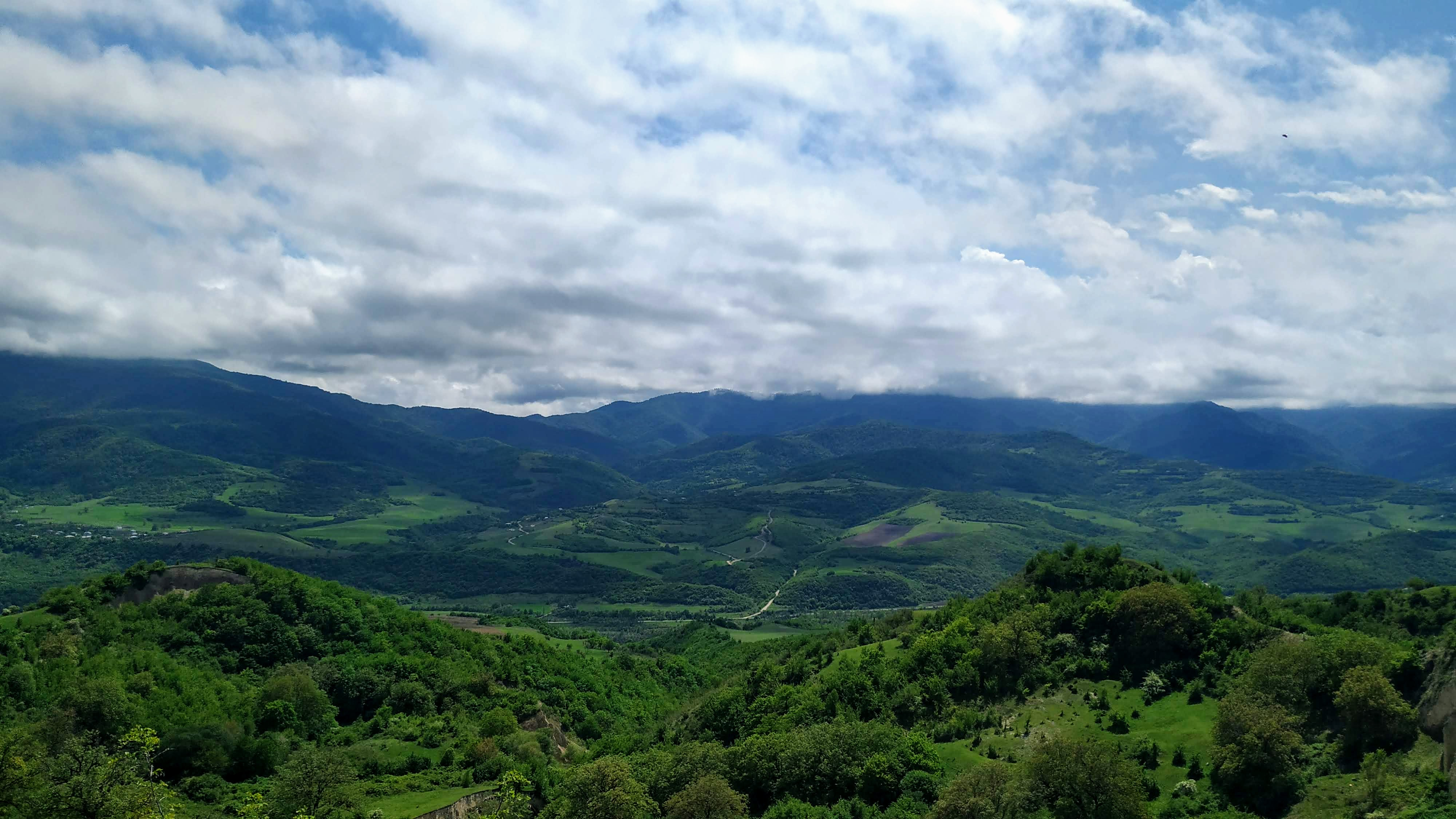
