= Nareshtar, Nagorno-Karabakh =

Nareshtar / Narinjlar Նարեշտար / Narınclar
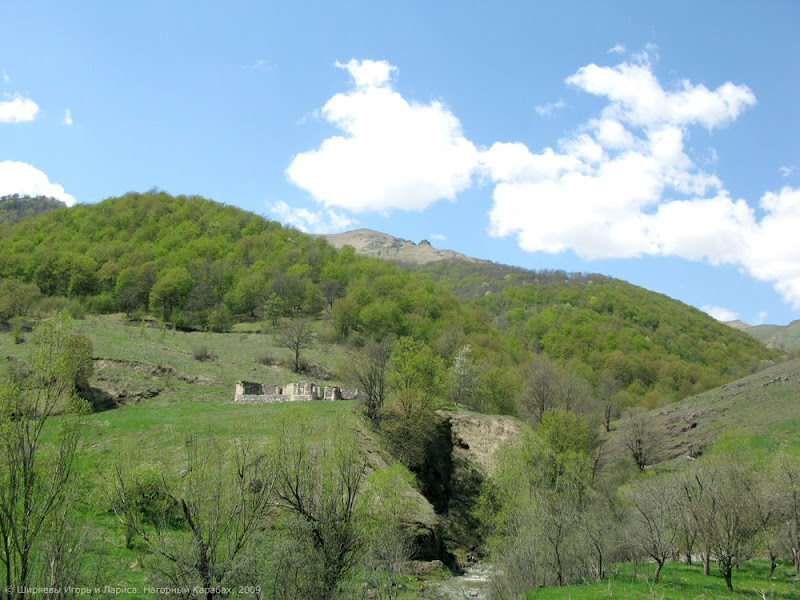
- Scenery around the village

- Location within Azerbaijan Location within East Zangezur Economic Region
- Coordinates: 40°02′33″N 46°24′34″E
- Country: Azerbaijan
  - District: Aghdara

Population (2015)
  - Total: 4
- Time zone: UTC+4 (AZT)

Nareshtar (Armenian: Նարեշտար) or Narinjlar (Azerbaijani: Narınclar) is a village that is located in the Aghdara District of Azerbaijan, in the region of Nagorno-Karabakh. The village had an Azerbaijani-majority population prior to their exodus during the First Nagorno-Karabakh War.

== History ==
During the Soviet period, the village was part of the Mardakert District of the Nagorno-Karabakh Autonomous Oblast.

== Economy and culture ==
The population is mainly engaged in agriculture and animal husbandry. The village is part of the community of Vank.

== Demographics ==
The village had an ethnic Armenian-majority population of 10 inhabitants in 2005, and 4 inhabitants in 2015.
