= Kingdom of Artsakh =

Medieval era Armenian kingdom

Kingdom of Artsakh Արցախի թագավորություն
- 1000–1261
- Royal Standard of the Principality of Khachen (Kingdom of Artsakh) during the reign of Grand Prince Hasan-Jalal Dawla (1214-1261)

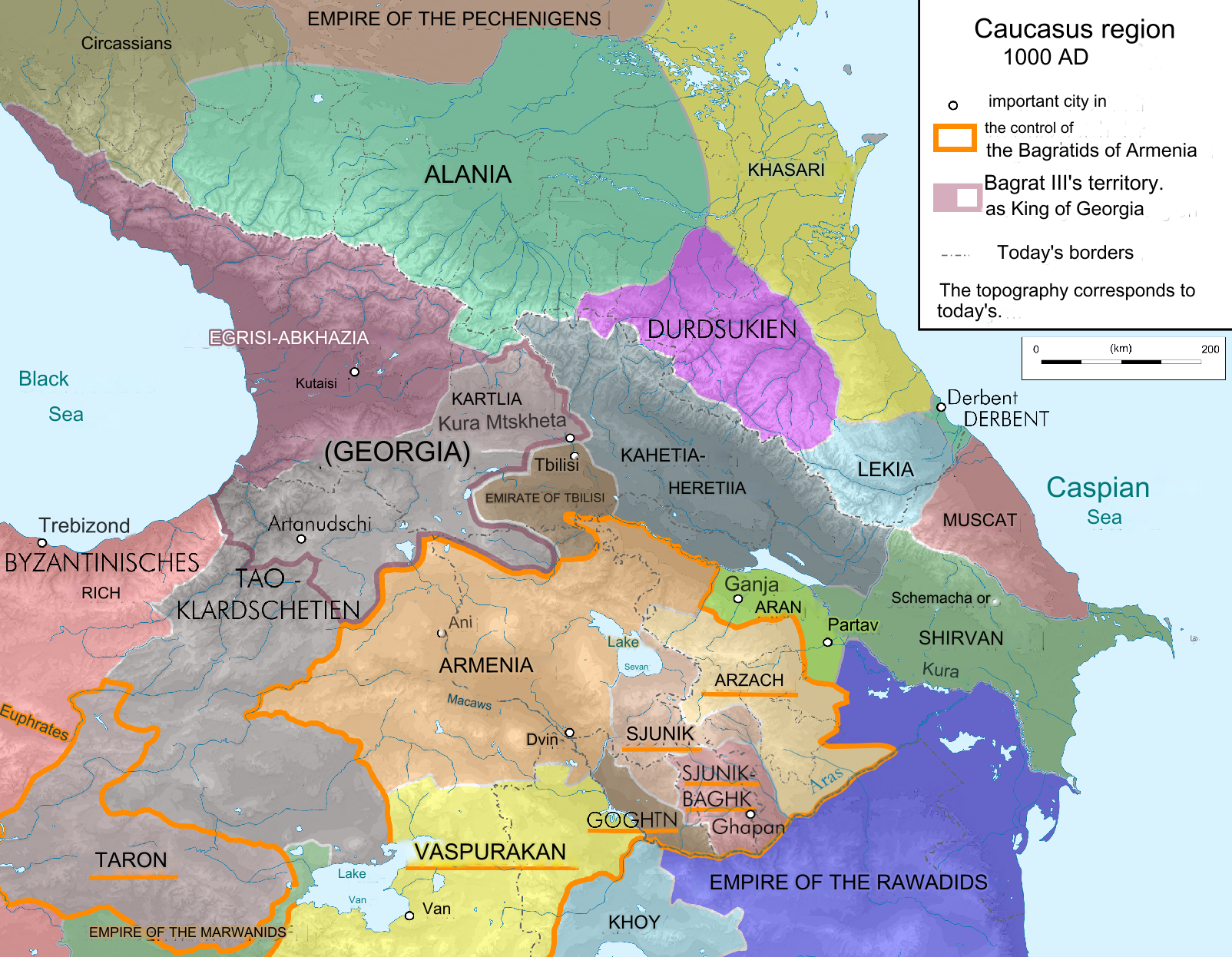
- Syunik as vassal of the Armenian kingdom around 1000
- Capital: Khachen, Haterk, Vaykunik
- Common languages: Armenian
- Religion: Armenian Apostolic
- Government: Monarchy
- King
- History
  - Established: 1000
  - Subdivision of the kingdom: 1182
  - Acquisition of Dizak and Gardman: 1261
  - Assassination of Hasan Jalal, last king of Artsakh: 1261
Preceded by	Succeeded by
Bagratid Armenia	Principality of Khachen

The Kingdom of Artsakh (Armenian: Արցախի թագավորություն) was a medieval dependent Armenian kingdom on the territory of Syunik and Artsakh provinces, Gardman canton of Utik province, Mazaz and Varazhnunik canton of Ayrarat province. Contemporary sources referred to it as the Khachen. However, because the domain of Khachen during the reign of Prince Hasan Jalal included the entire territory of the former Nagorno Karabakh Republic plus many contiguous lands to its west, south and north, his principality was often called the Kingdom of Artsakh. The royal house of Khachen was a cadet branch of the ancient Syunid dynasty and was named Khachen, after its main stronghold. Hasan-Jalal traced his descent to the Armenian Aranshahik dynasty, a family that predated the establishment of the Parthian Arsacids in the region.

Artsakh maintained its sovereign rulers, though in the early 13th century they accepted Georgian, then Mongol suzerainty. They lost the royal title after the assassination of Hasan-Jalal (1214–1261) by the Ilkhanid ruler Arghun, but continued to rule Syunik as a principality, which from the 16th century comprised five Armenian melikdoms of Artsakh and Kashatagh melikdom of Syunik which lasted until the early 19th century.
