= Kirakos Gandzaketsi =

13th-century Armenian historian

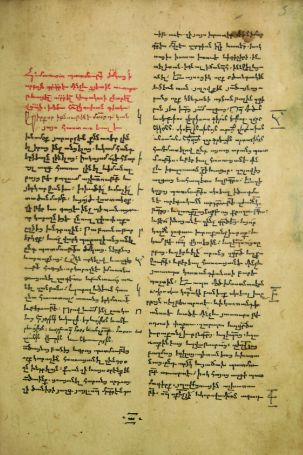
The opening page of a 1664 manuscript copy of History of Armenia by Kirikos (Matenadaran MS 2561)

Kirakos Gandzaketsi (Armenian: Կիրակոս Գանձակեցի; c. 1200/1202–1271) was an Armenian historian of the 13th century and author of the History of Armenia, a summary of events from the 4th to the 12th century and a detailed description of the events of his own days. The work concentrates primarily on the history of Medieval Armenia and events occurring in the Caucasus and Near East. The work serves as a primary source for the study of the Mongol invasions and even contains the first recorded word list of the Mongolian language. The work has been translated into several languages including Latin, French and Russian.

== Life ==
Kirakos was born in the region of Gandzak (around Ganja, presently in Azerbaijan) in or around 1200. He attended the school of New Getik (later known as Goshavank) in 1209-1212 in the village of Tandzut in the region of Kayen (classes were originally taught in a cave and it was only later that they relocated to a one-room building). He was the pupil of Vanakan Vardapet, a scholar and native from his native Gandzak. In 1215, Kirakos along with his classmates and their teacher Vanakan moved to study at the school of Khoranashat monastery in Tavush. The school was founded by Hovhannes Vanakan - a student of Mkhitar Gosh.

With the Mongol invasion of the 1230s, Kirakos and his mentor were captured by Mongol forces in the spring of 1236. As captives, however, he and Vanakan managed to serve as secretaries for the Mongols. This was factually slavery. During this time, Kirakos learned the Mongolian language and he later compiled his knowledge of it into a list of 55 words with their corresponding Armenian meanings. A ransom was paid to free Vanakan in the summer of that year but Kirakos also managed to escape the same night and returned to the town of Getik.

Following Vanakan's death in 1251, Kirakos assumed his former teacher's duties and became the head of the school in New Getik. In 1255, he was granted an audience with the leader of the Armenian Kingdom of Cilicia, Hetum I, in the town of Vardenis (in Aragatsotn), informing him of missionary work in the region.

He remained in New Getik for several more years; he died in 1271 and was buried there.

== Works ==
Kirakos completed several works in his lifetime; however, his most prominent work is History of Armenia (Patmutʻiwn Hayotsʻ, a generic title for Armenian histories). He began to write the book on May 19, 1241 and completed it in 1265. Divided into two parts, the first part of his history begins with the life of Gregory the Illuminator, the patron saint of the Armenian Apostolic Church, and is devoted largely to the history of the Armenian church from the third century to the twelfth century. The second part focuses on the ramifications and physical damage inflicted against the people of the region by the Turkic and Mongol invasions, including the torture and death of Hasan-Jalal, the prince of Khachen. He made a detailed account of the Siege of Baghdad (1258) by the Mongols, using Prince Prosh Khaghbakian, who had participated to the operations, as his main source.

Approximately 47 facsimiles of the 65 chapters of History of Armenia survived and can be found in numerous repositories located around the world including the Matenadaran in Yerevan, Armenia and museums in Vienna, London, Paris, and St. Petersburg.
