= Zhingyalov hats =

Armenian flatbread

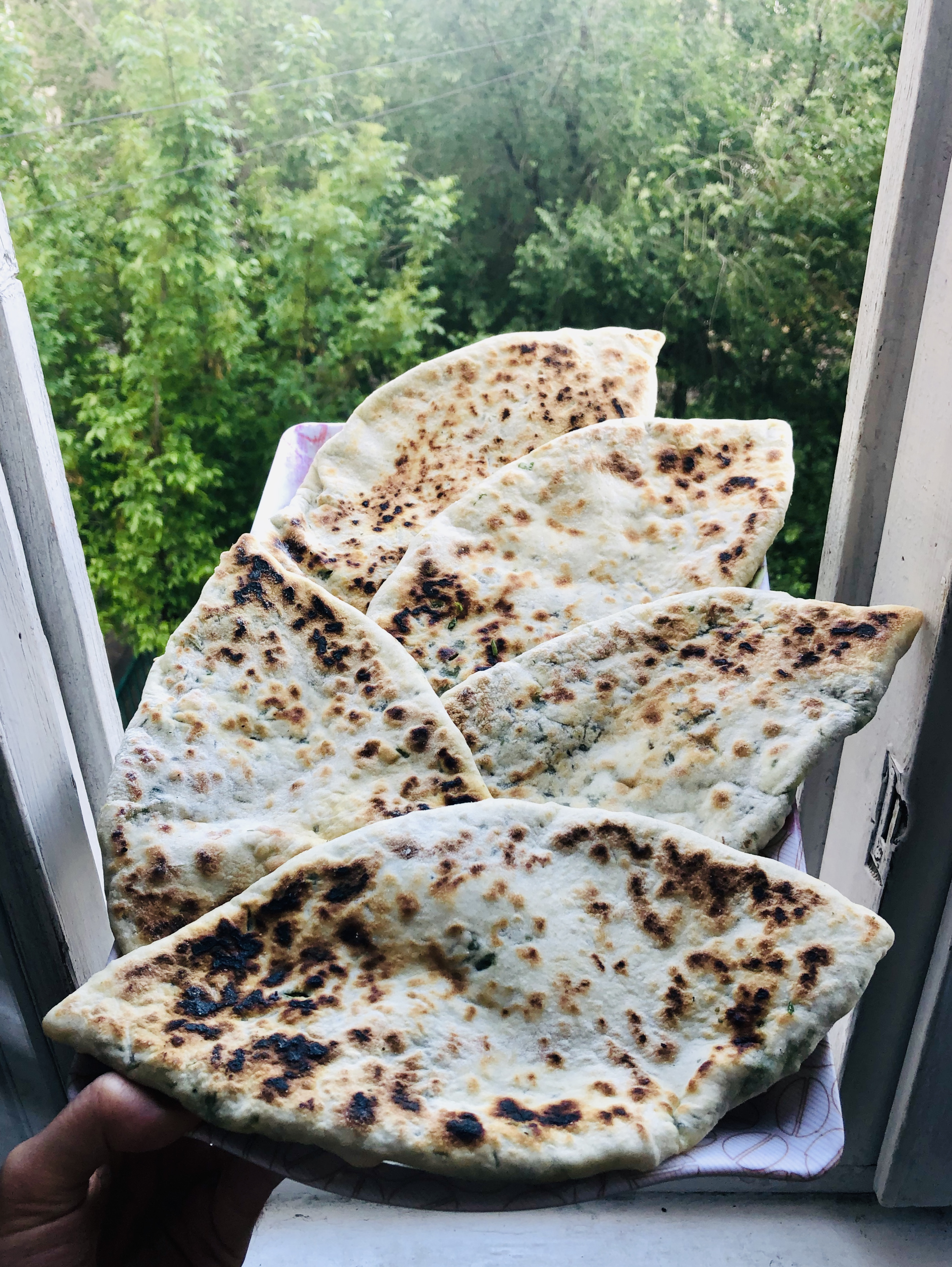
Zhingyalov hats

Zhingyalov hats (Armenian: Ժենգյալով հաց, also zhengyalav hatz, zhangyalov hats, or jingalov hats) is a type of flatbread stuffed with finely diced herbs and green vegetables. It is a traditional dish of Armenians from Artsakh and Syunik and has traditionally been a staple in times of scarcity, such as famine and war.

Zhengyalov Hatz, an Armenian restaurant in Glendale, California, has been recognized and featured in an article by the Michelin Guide in 2025 for its mastercraft of the dish.

== Preparation ==
Unleavened dough is rolled out until it becomes paper-thin, then it is filled with a stuffing that consists of 10 to 20 types of diced and oiled wild and cultivated herbs. One of the most important steps in preparing a good zhingyalov hats is the greens' composition. Tasteless leaf vegetables and herbs with less pronounced taste make up the base of the stuffing: examples include lettuce, spinach, atriplex, beet greens, chickweed, shepherd's-purse, viola leaves and similar plants. Herbs with distinctive tastes (chervil, urtica, allium), sour (rumex) or spicy (laserpitium) ones are needed in smaller quantities; bitter-tasting greens as taraxacum should be sparse. Additionally the stuffing might contain bryndza and fried onions.

After stuffing, zhingyalov hats are fried for around 10 minutes on a special griddle called "saj" or "sajin" (Armenian: սաջին), or in a tonir for a couple of minutes.

The finished dish is consumed with beer, doogh, or wine. Zhingyalov hats is especially popular during the Great Lent.

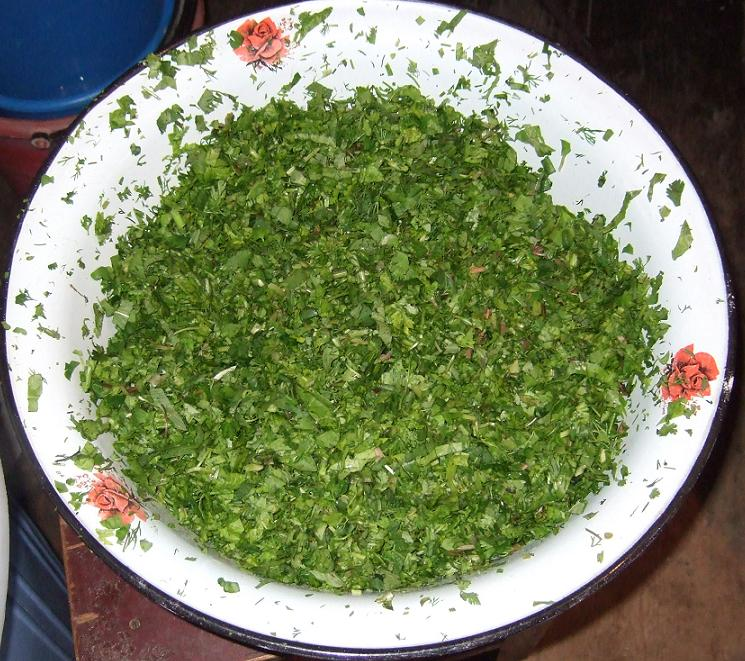
Diced herbs

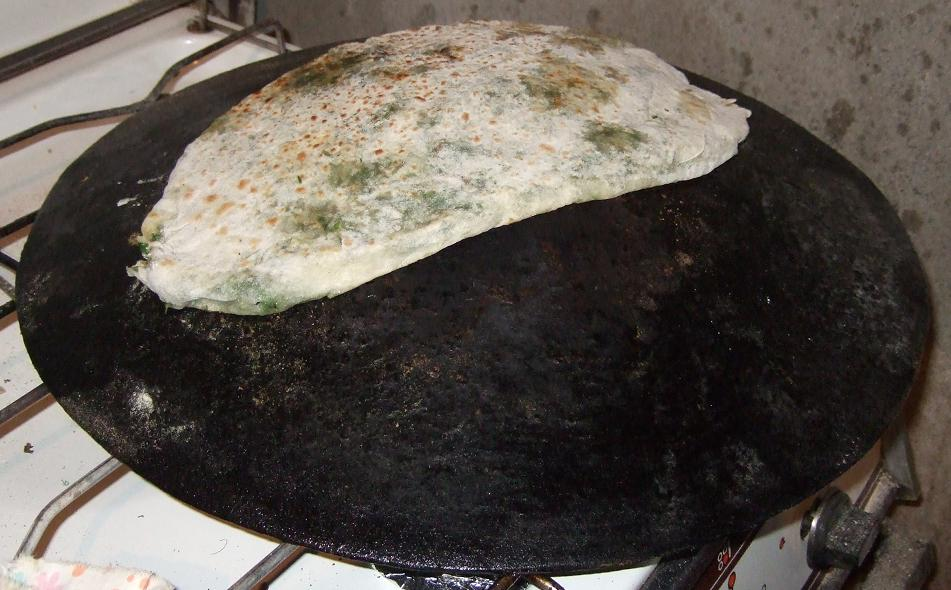
Preparing zhingyalov hats

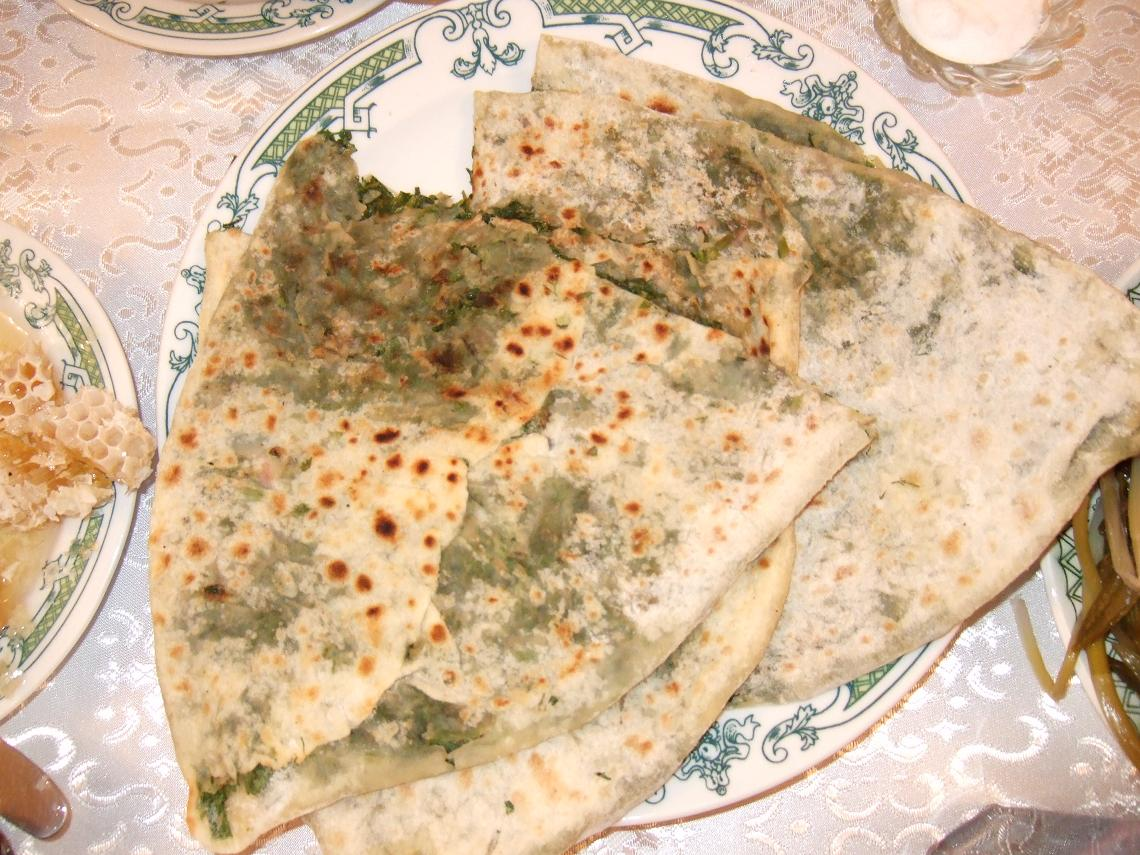
Ready meal

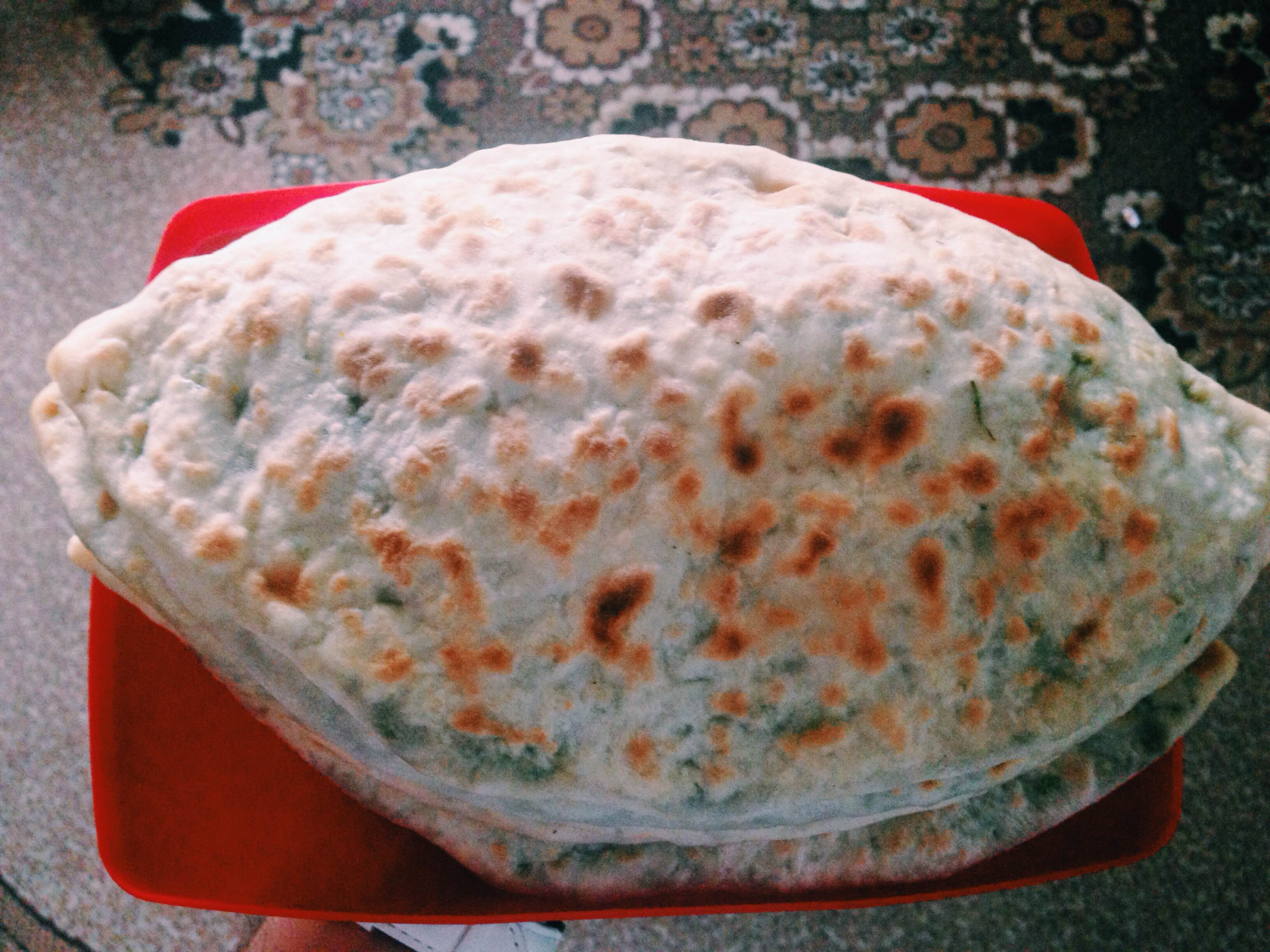
Zhingyalov hats ready to be consumed

== See also ==
- Gözleme
- Quesadilla
