= Hasan-Jalalyan =

Armenian dynasty which ruled Khachen from 1214

Hasan-Jalalyan Հասան-Ջալալյաններ
- Parent house: Aranshahik; Bagratuni dynasty Artsruni; Arsacid dynasty
- Country: Artsakh
- Founded: 1214
- Founder: Hasan-Jalal Dawla
- Final ruler: Allahverdi II Hasan-Jalalyan
- Titles: King of Artsakh; King of Artsakh and Baghk; Prince of Khachen; Prince of Artsakh

Hasan-Jalalyan (Armenian: Հասան-Ջալալյաններ) is a medieval Armenian dynasty that ruled over parts of the South Caucasus. From the early thirteenth century, the family held sway in Khachen (Greater Artsakh) in what are now the regions of lower Karabakh, Nagorno-Karabakh, and Syunik in modern Armenia and Azerbaijan. The family was founded by Hasan-Jalal Dawla, an Armenian feudal prince from Khachen. The Hasan-Jalalyans maintained their autonomy over the course of several centuries of nominal foreign domination by the Seljuk Turks, Persians and Mongols. They, along with the other Armenian princes and meliks of Khachen, saw themselves as holding the last bastion of Armenian independence in the region.

Through their patronage of churches and monasteries, Armenian culture flourished in the region. By the late sixteenth century, the Hasan-Jalalyan family had branched out to establish principalities in nearby Gulistan and Jraberd. Along with the separately ruled melikdoms of Varanda and Dizak, these five principalities formed the Five Melikdoms of Karabakh, also known as the Melikdoms of Khamsa.

== Origins ==
Hasan-Jalal traced his descent to the Armenian Aranshahik dynasty, a family that predated the establishment of the Parthian Arsacids in the region. Hasan-Jalal's ancestry was "almost exclusively" Armenian according to Robert H. Hewsen:

In the male line, (1) the princes (who later became kings) of Siunik. Through various princesses, who married his ancestors, Hasan-Jalal was descended from (2) the kings of Armenia or the Bagratuni dynasty, centered at Ani; (3) the Armenian kings of Vaspurakan of the Artsruni dynasty, centered in the region of Van; 4) the princes of Gardman; (5) the Sassanid dynasty of Persia, and (6) the Arsacids, the second royal house of Albania, itself a branch of (7) the kings of ancient Parthia.

Hasan-Jalal Dawla's family roots were entrenched in an intricate array of royal marriages with new and old Armenian nakharar families. Hasan-Jalal's grandfather was Hasan I (also known as Hasan the Great), a prince who ruled over the northern half of Artsakh.

In 1182, Hasan I had stepped down as ruler of the region and entered monastic life at Dadivank, dividing his land into two: the southern half (comprising much of Khachen) went to his oldest son Vakhtank II (also known as Tangik) and the northern half went to the youngest, Gregory the Black. Vakhtank II married Khorishah Zakarian, who was the daughter of Sargis Zakarian, the progenitor of the Zakarid line of princes. When he married the daughter of Mamkan, the Aranshahik king of Dizak-Balk, Hasan-Jalal also inherited his father-in-law's lands.

In the late 1960s and into the 1970s, Hasan-Jalal's origins became embroiled in a debate revolving around the history of Artsakh between Soviet Armenian and Azerbaijani scholars. Azerbaijani scholars have sought to construct a pseudohistorical national past by casting the kingdoms and principalities that were founded on the territory of the modern republic of Azerbaijan during the medieval period as Caucasian Albanian. Based on a dubious rereading and interpretation of primary sources, scholars Ziya Bunyadov and Farida Mammadova both argued in their first publications in the 1950s and 1960s that the leaders and inhabitants of Caucasian Albania, a state established in the 2nd century BC, were the direct ancestors of modern Azeris, thereby establishing a link to the ancient past and the Azerbaijanis' indigeneity to Nagorno-Karabakh. In the process, the Armenians, including Hasan-Jalal Dawla, who inhabited the South Caucasus have been written out of the narrative altogether. Mamedova asserted that Hasan-Jalal, based on a specious interpretation of an inscription carved into the Gandzasar monastery by the prince, was Caucasian Albanian. Her conclusions, and that of the Azerbaijani school, have been roundly rejected by other historians.

== Prince Hasan-Jalal Dawla ==
Hasan-Jalal Dawla/Jalal I
- Հասան Ջալալ Դոլա/Ջալալ Ա
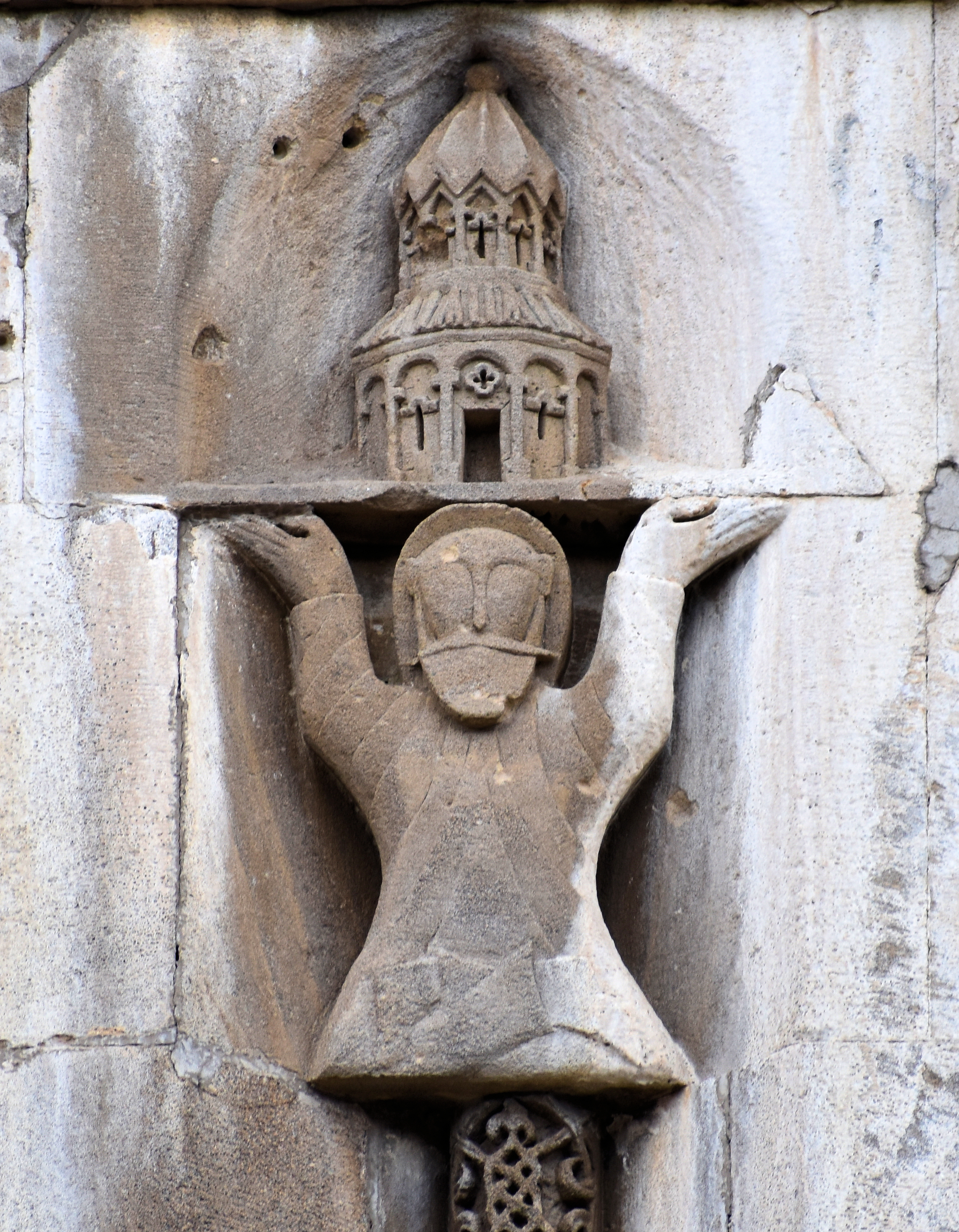
- Depiction of Hasan-Jalal Dawla, Gandzasar monastery, 1238

King of Artsakh
- Preceded by: Vakhtang II
- Succeeded by: Ivane–Atabek I

Personal details
- Born: unknown
- Died: 1261 Qazvin (modern–day Iran)
- Resting place: Gandzasar Monastery (modern–day Azerbaijan)
- Children: Mamakhathun, Minakhathun, Ruzan, Ivane-Atabek

Military service
- Battles/wars: Mongol invasions of Caucasus; Siege of Havakhaghats; Siege of Jraberd; Siege of Ishkhanaberd; Mongol conquest of Anatolia; Battle of Köse Dag

=== Cultural life ===
With the surrender of Ani in 1045 and Kars in 1064, the final independent Armenian state in historic Armenia, the Bagratuni kingdom, was dissolved and incorporated into the domains of the Byzantine Empire. However, despite foreign domination of the region, which became more pronounced after the Seljuk Turks defeated the Byzantines at the Battle of Manzikert in 1071, Armenians in eastern Armenia were able to maintain autonomy in the two mountainous strongholds in Syunik and Lori and in the principality of Khachen. From the early to mid-12th century, combined Georgian and Armenian armies were successful in pushing the Turkic groups out of eastern Armenia, thereby establishing a period of relative peace and prosperity until the appearance of the Mongols in 1236.

Khachen had once been a part of Syunik until numerous Turkic invasions severed it from the rest of the kingdom. The reign of the Hasan-Jalalyan family was concentrated around the Terter and the Khachenaget rivers. Hasan-Jalal's birth date is unknown․ His reign began in 1214 and ended with his death sometime between 1261 and 1262 in Qazvin. His domain encompassed both Artsakh and the surrounding Armenian regions. When his father Vakhtank died in 1214, Hasan-Jalal inherited his lands and took up residence in a castle at Akana in Jraberd. He was addressed with the titles tagavor (king; Armenian: թագավոր) or inknakal (autocrat or absolute ruler; ինքնակալ) but took the official title of "King of Artsakh and Balk" when he married the daughter of the final king of Dizak-Balk. The medieval Armenian historian Kirakos Gandzaketsi extolled Hasan-Jalal in his work History of Armenia, showering him with praise for his piety and devotion to Christianity:

He was...a pious and God-loving man, mild and meek, merciful, and a lover of the poor, striving in prayers and entreaties like one who lived in the desert. He performed matins and vespers unhindered, no matter where he might be, like a monk; and in memory of the Resurrection of our Savior, he spent Sunday without sleeping, in a standing vigil. He was very fond of the priests, a lover of knowledge, and a reader of the divine Gospels.

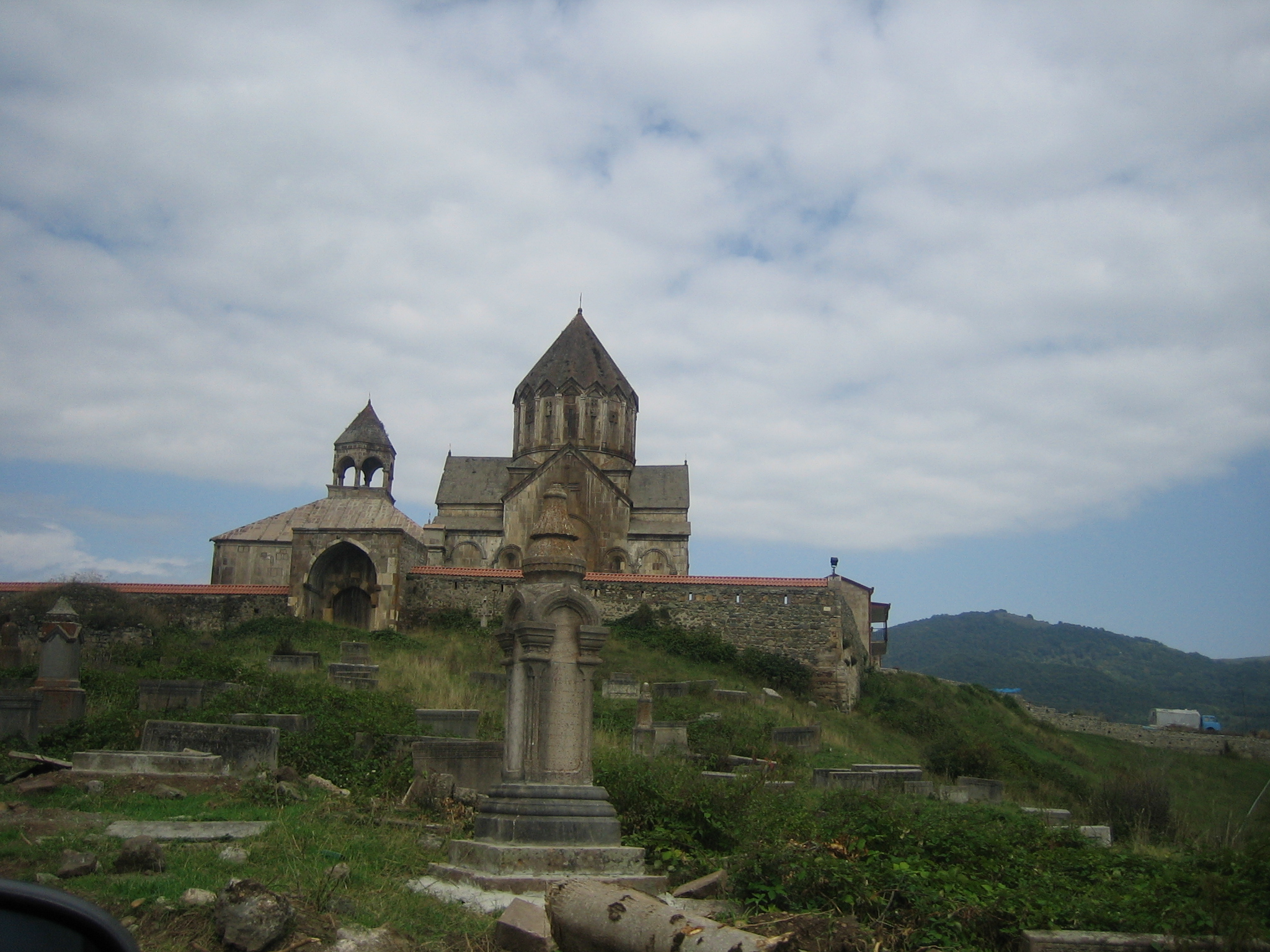
The Gandzasar monastery in present-day Martakert, which went on to serve as the family sepulcher and religious See, was completed in 1240.

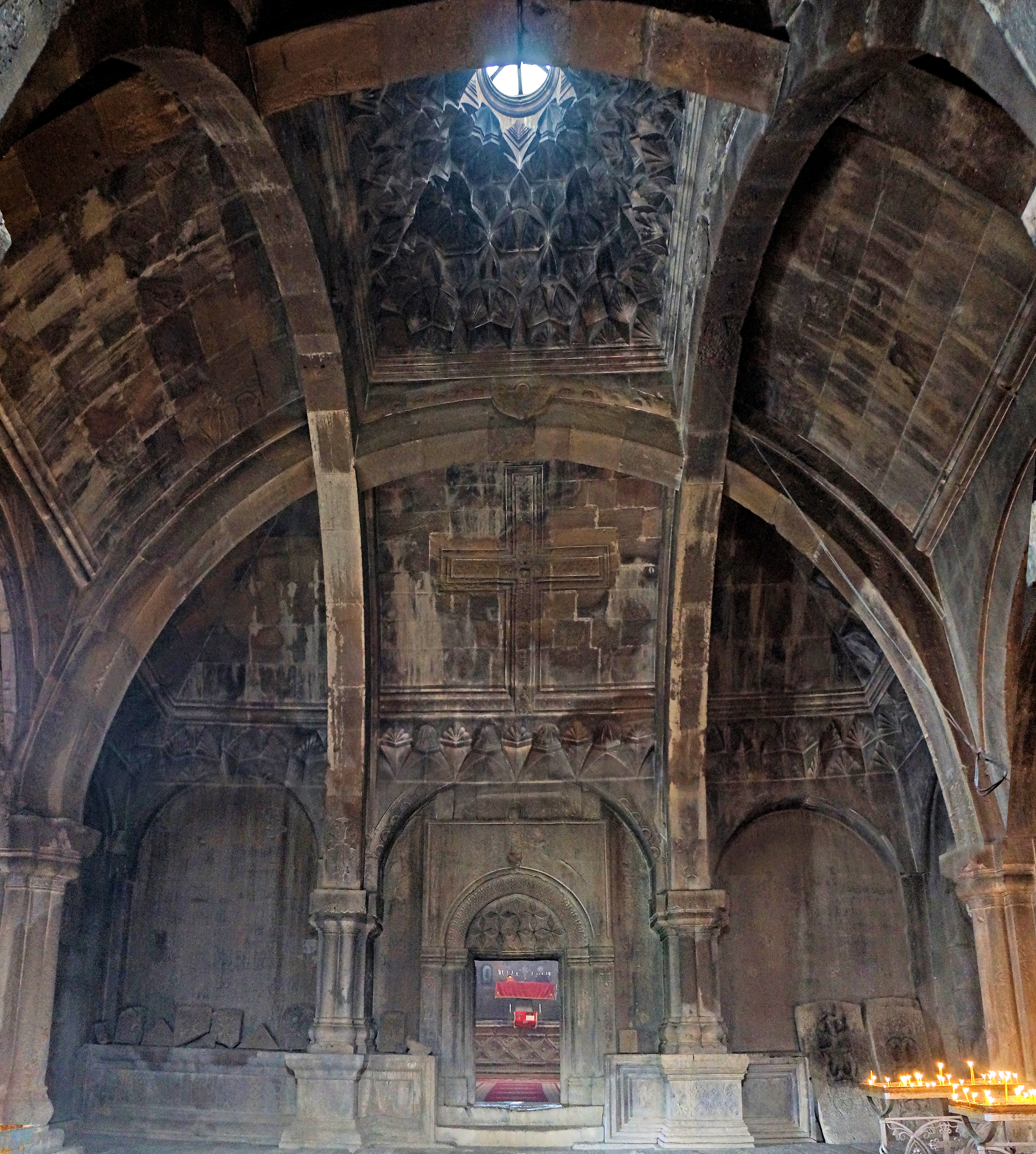
The Gandzasar Zhamatun, dedicated by Hasan-Jalalyan in 1261.

A further testament to this devotion included Hasan-Jalal's commissioning of the Gandzasar Monastery. Construction of the monastery began in 1216 and lasted until 1238. On July 22, 1240, amid great celebration during Vardavar (Feast of the Transfiguration) celebrations and in the presence of nearly 700 priests including Nerses, the Catholicos of Albania, the church was consecrated. In 1261, Hasan-Jalalyan further completed a zhamatun next to the church, and left a dedicatory inscription:

In the year 710 (ie 1261 CE) I, J̌alal Dawlay, son of Vaxt‘ang, Governor of Arc‘ax, and my wife Mamk‘an, granddaughter of the King of Bałk‘, and my son At‘abak-Iwanē, founded (this) žamatun after the completion of the Church and finished it after much work... And again I, At‘abak, gladly donated a golden cased Gospel and the glorious holy Christ-bearing Sign and... instituted to celebrate the Eucharist for Christ for eight days during the (Feast of ) the Cross.

The monastery went on to become the residence and sepulcher of the family as well as the residence of the catholicos; beginning in the fifteenth century, the family monopolized control over the seat of Catholicos itself, which would thereon pass down from uncle to nephew. Hasan-Jalal's son Hovhannes VII is considered to be the first to have established this practice when he became the Catholicos whereas his nephew, also named Hovhannes, became the second.

Despite his Christian faith, Muslim influence in the region had pervaded and influenced the culture and customs of the Christians living in Georgia and Armenia, especially after the Seljuk Turks invaded the Caucasus. Antony Eastmond, for example, notes that "many of the outward manifestations of [Hasan-Jalal's] rule were presented through Islamic customs and titles, most notably in his depiction on his principal foundation of Gandzasar." The image of Hasan-Jalal on the drum of Gandzasar's dome has him sitting cross-legged, which Eastmond remarks was a "predominant device for depicting power at the Seljuq court." Hasan-Jalal's name also betrayed Muslim influence: as was the fashion of the time, many Armenians adopted Arabic patronymics (kunya) that lost any "connection with original Armenian names," the Russian orientalist Vladimir Minorsky noted. Hasan-Jalal's Armenian name was Haykaz but the Arabic words in his name, in fact, described his person: thus, Hasan meant handsome; Jalal, grand; Dawla, wealth and governance.

=== The Armenian Synaxarion ===
Gandzasar served as a scriptorium, and was where the first completed Haysmavurk (Synaxarion), a calendar collection of short lives of saints and accounts of important religious events, was completed in Armenia. Medieval chroniclers attributed the production of the new and better organized Haysmavurk to Hasan-Jalal, who asked Father Israel (Ter-Israel), a disciple of an important Armenian medieval philosopher and Artsakh native known as Vanakan Vardapet, to undertake the work. The Haysmavurk was further developed by Kirakos Gandzaketsi. Ever since the Haysmavurk ordered by Hasan-Jalal became known as "Synaxarion of Ter-Israel"; it was mass printed in Constantinople in 1834.

=== Mongol invasion ===
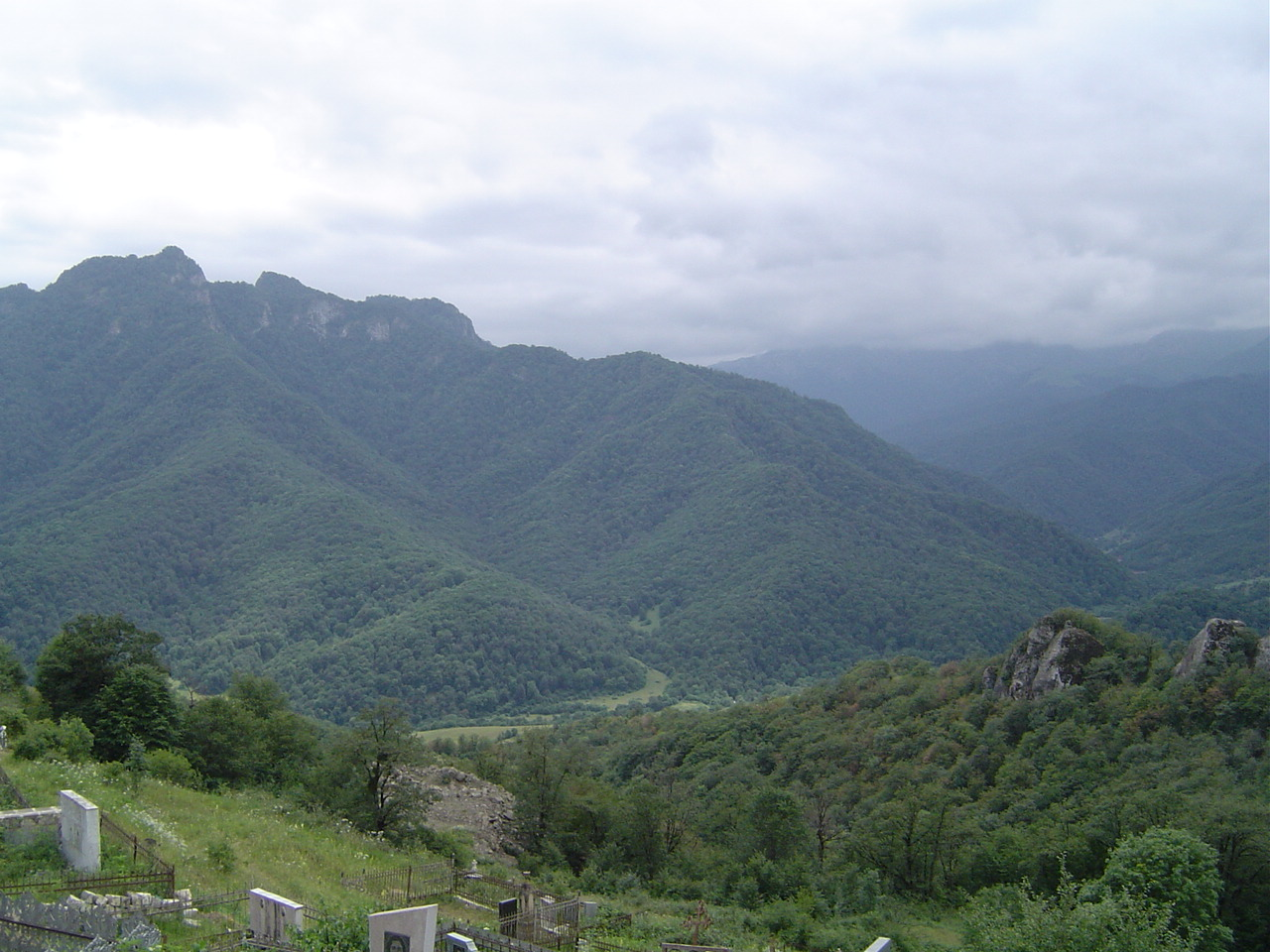
The remains of Hasan-Jalal's fortress of Khokhanaberd, as seen from Gandzasar, are on the mountain on the left.

In 1236, the Ilkhanate Mongol armies invaded the Caucasus. Prior to them entering Khachen, Hasan Jalal and his people were able to take refuge at Ishkhanberd (located directly south of Gandzasar; also known by its Persian name of Khokhanaberd). Given its formidable location atop a mountain, the Mongols chose not to besiege the fortress and sued for negotiations with Hasan-Jalal: they exchanged his loyalty and military service to the Mongol Empire in return for some of the immediate lands adjacent to Khachen that they had conquered. In 1240–1242, Hasan Jalal struck coins of common Mongol types in Khachen on the mints of "Qarabāgh" (in Khokhanaberd) and "Lajīn" (in Havkakhaghats berd).

Feeling the need to preserve his power, Hasan-Jalal twice undertook a journey to Karakorum, the capital of the Mongol empire, where he was able to obtain special autonomy rights and privileges for himself and the people under his domain from the ruling khan. Despite this arrangement, the Mongols viewed many of the people of the region with contempt and taxed them excessively. Arghun Khan, the regional Mongol ostikan at the time, placed so many restrictions against Armenians that it prompted Hasan-Jalal in 1256 to travel to the capital once more to protest against the encroachments upon Catholicos Nerses. In response, Batu Khan drafted a document "guaranteeing freedom for Lord Nerses, Katolikos of Albania, for all his properties and goods, that he be free and untaxed and allowed to travel freely everywhere in the dioceses under his authority, and that no one disobey what he said." Hasan-Jalal also attempted to strengthen his alliances with the Mongols by having his daughter Rhuzukan marry Bora Noyan, the son of a Mongol leader. Relations between Armenians and Mongols deteriorated, however, and the document issued by the khan failed to safeguard Hasan-Jalal's rights.

Finally, in 1260, Hasan-Jalal decided to ally himself with the forces of the Georgian king David Narin, who was leading an insurrection against Mongol rule. He was captured several times by the Mongols yet his family was able to free him by paying a ransom. The insurrection eventually failed and on the orders of Arghun Khan, Hasan-Jalal was arrested once more and taken to Qazvin, (now in Iran). According to Kirakos Ganzaketsi, Rhuzukan appealed to the Hulagu Khan's wife Doquz Khatun, to pressure Arghun to free her father. Upon learning of this, however, Arghun Khan had Hasan-Jalal tortured and finally executed. Hasan Jalal's son Atabek sent several of his men to Iran to retrieve his father's dismembered body, which had been tossed into a well. After it was brought back, the body was given a funeral and buried at Gandzasar monastery.

== Later family rule ==
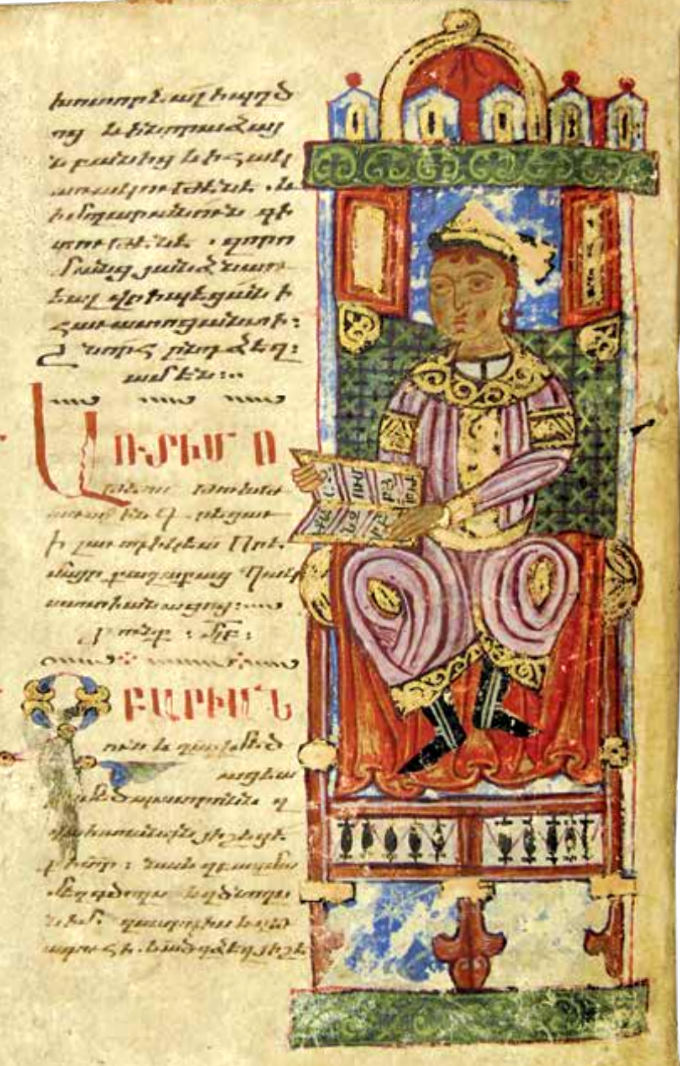
Prince Vakhtank (Hasan-Jalal’s grandson) Relic of the New Testament, 13th century, Ms 155, f. 106v.

Following his death, the family shortened Hasan-Jalal's official title to just "Princes of Artsakh." Atabek was ordered by Hulegu to take over his father's position and held the post until 1306. His cousin Vakhtank (died 1347), whose descendants would become the Melik-Avanyan family, was given control over the region of Dizak. As a method of showing their relation to Hasan-Jalal, his descendants adopted Hasan-Jalal as their surname and appended the suffix -yan at the end. The family funded numerous architectural and cultural projects which continue to stand today, including Gandzasar monastery and the adjacent Church of St. John the Baptist. In the late 16th century, the family branched out and established melikdoms in settlements in Jraberd, Khachen and Gulistan.

=== Ottoman-Persian Wars ===
During the Turko-Persian wars of the seventeenth century and eighteenth century, the meliks fiercely resisted and fought back against incursions made by both sides. In the last quarter of the 18th century, they aided the invading imperial Russian armies to help clear the region of both the Turks and Persians. The Hasan-Jalalyans were one of the most prominent of the melik families that took up the cause to liberate the region from foreign control; the foremost among them being Catholicos Yesayi Hasan-Jalalyan (? - 1728). In 1677, Armenian Catholicos Hakob of Julfa had held a secret meeting with the meliks of Karabakh, proposing that a delegation journey to Europe to garner support for the liberation of the region. In 1711, Yesayi, accompanying Israel Ori, traveled to Russia to gather support for the formation of an Armenian army under Peter the Great. Ori, however, died on the way, and Yesayi soon took over as the lead figure of the movement. He continued negotiations with Peter, and in a letter sent to him in 1718, promised the support of a 10–12,000-man Armenian army as well as support from neighboring Georgian forces. His entreaties continued until 1724, when the Treaty of Constantinople (1724) was signed by Peter the Great that gave the Muslim-populated regions in eastern Transcaucasia to Russia and Christian-populated western regions to the Turks. Both had just finished conquering swaths of Safavid territory comprising large parts of the Caucasus and eastern Anatolia while the Safavid realm was disintegrating in a civil war. Russian interest in the Caucasus soon waned after Peter's death in 1725 as its leaders pulled their forces back across the Terek River. The territories gained by Russia in the North and South Caucasus were ceded back to Iran (now led by Nader Shah) per the treaties of Resht and Ganja of 1732 and 1735, respectively.

While the Ottomans temporarily gained the Christian regions of the disintegrating Safavid realm, Yesai was blamed for this failure by some of the leaders of the Armenian army as they were forced to fend for themselves against the Turkish invasions.

From the seventeenth century to the early nineteenth century, several cadet branches of the Hasan-Jalalyans were established, including the Melik-Atabekyan family, who became the last rulers of the principality of Jraberd. Allahverdi II Hasan-Jalalyan, who died in 1813, was the final melik of Khachen when the Russian Empire gained control of the region in 1805 during the Russo-Persian War of 1804–1813. In 1828, following the end of the second Russo-Persian War and the cession of Persia's last territories in the South Caucasus to Russia according to the Treaty of Turkmenchay, the Russians dissolved the Catholicosate of Albania, although a member of the Hasan-Jalalyan family, Balthasar, became Primate of Artsakh, which was tantamount of the position of Catholicos of Albania in all but name.

== Hasan-Jalalyans today ==
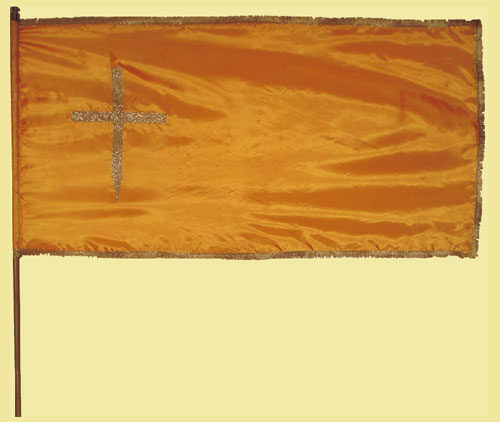
The flag of the Hasan-Jalalyan family today.

At the time of the publication of Hewsen's initial article in 1972 in the journal Revue des Études Arméniennes, the author was unable to trace any survivors of the house but did note that the final two Catholicos of Albania, Hovhannes XII (1763–1786) and Sargis II (1794–1815), had a dozen brothers altogether, all who left a "numerous progeny by the middle of the nineteenth century." He was also able to identify a woman named Eleanora Hasan-Jalalian who was living in Yerevan as an artist at the turn of the 19th to 20th century. In later years, Soviet sources also listed the biography of Ruben Hasan-Jalalyan (1840–1902), an Armenian writer, poet and lawyer who lived in the Russian Empire. One person, a man named Stepan Hasan Jalalyan from Drmbon, Martakert Region of Nagorno Karabakh, served as a deputy in the Armenian National Assembly as a member of the Heritage Party and fought in the First Nagorno-Karabakh War.

Several artifacts of the Hasan-Jalalyans survive until today, including Hasan-Jalal's personal dagger, complete with an Armenian inscription, which is currently on display at the Hermitage Museum in St Petersburg.

== See also ==
- Armenian nobility
- Principality of Khachen
- Nagorno Karabakh Republic
- Artsakh
- Nagorno Karabakh
- Culture of Nagorno-Karabakh
- History of Nagorno-Karabakh
- List of Armenians from Nagorno-Karabakh
