= Principality of Khachen =

Medieval Armenian principality

Principality of Khachen Խաչենի իշխանություն
- 1261–1603
- Royal standard of the Hasan Jalalyan family

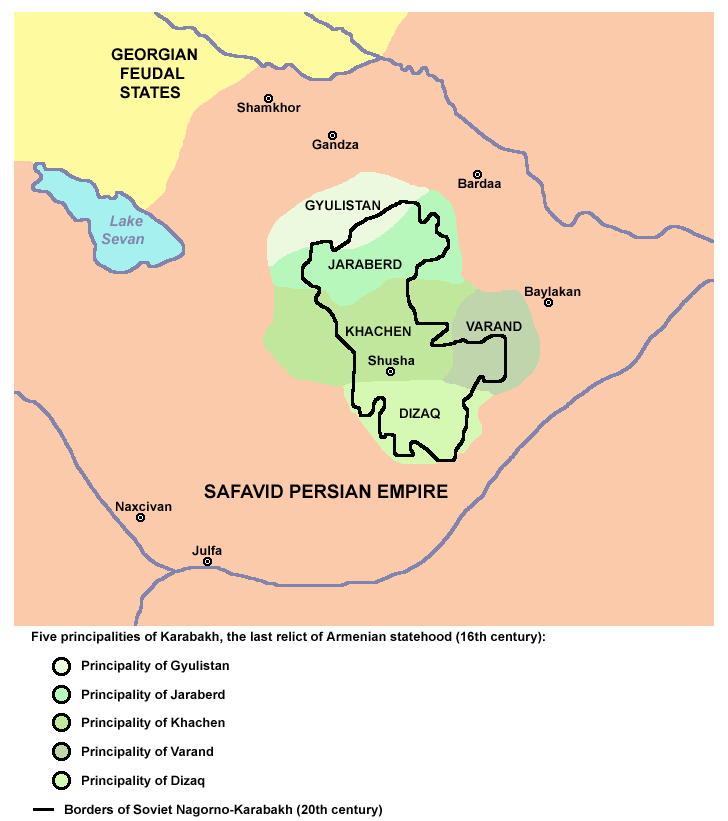
- Territory of the 5 principalities of Karabakh, overlapped by the NKAO
- Capital: Gandzasar (Vank), Haterk, Tsar (Vaykunik)
- Common languages: Karabakh dialect
- Religion: Armenian Apostolic
- Government: Monarchy
- History
  - Established: 1261
  - Disestablished: 1603
Preceded by	Succeeded by
Kingdom of Artsakh	Melikdoms of Karabakh

The Principality of Khachen (Modern Armenian: Խաչենի իշխանություն, Khach’eni ishkhanut’yun) was a medieval Armenian principality on the territory of historical Artsakh (present-day Karabakh). The provinces of Artsakh and Utik were attached to the Kingdom of Armenia in antiquity, although they were later lost to Caucasian Albania. In the early medieval period, these provinces were under Sassanid and then Arab suzerainty until the establishment of the Bagratid Kingdom of Armenia in the 9th century. From the 12th century, the principality of Khachen dominated the region. The Byzantine emperor Constantine VII addressed his letters to the prince of Khachen with the inscription "To Prince of Khachen, Armenia."

All of the contemporary sources refer to the ruler of the principality an Armenian prince. The Armenian princely family of Hasan Jalalyan began ruling much of Khachen and Artsakh in 1214. In 1216, the Jalalyans founded the Gandzasar monastery which became the seat of the Armenian Apostolic Catholicos of Albania, forced to Khachen from Partav (Barda) by the steady Islamization of the city. The Khamsa (The Five) principalities maintained Armenian autonomy in the region throughout the Persian-Ottoman Wars. In 1603 the Persians established a protectorate over the Khamsa and sponsored the establishment of a local khanate in 1750.

The name Khamsa, which was used by Arabs for the state, refers to the five Armenian Melikdoms who ruled the state.

== See also ==
- House of Hasan-Jalalyan
- History of Nagorno-Karabakh
- Artsakh (disambiguation)
- Karabakh
- Armenia
- Republic of Artsakh
