= Timeline of Artsakh history =

Republic of Artsakh

This is a timeline of Artsakh's history, representing territorial control under three columns:

- Realm
  The highest level of authority.
- State
  The state or administrative unit that the region of Artsakh belonged to.
- Artsakh
  Geopolitical entity in Artsakh proper (Mountainous Karabakh).

Timeline of Artsakh history
Starting Date	Sovereign	State/Region	Artsakh Proper
592 BC	Iran (Medes)		Unknown (Urtekhini?)
549 BC	Iran (Achaemenid dynasty)		Unknown (Urtekhini?)
321 BC			Unknown (Urtekhini?)
189 BC			
Armenia (Artaxiad dynasty)	Province of Artsakh of the Kingdom of Armenia 189 BC to 387 AD (Note: The exact date of the establishment of the Province of Artsakh is not known, but is believed to be sometime before 189 BC.)		
Sophene and Kingdom of Commagene – Tigranes the Great conquered these territories	Province of Artsakh of the Kingdom of Armenia 189 BC to 387 AD		
65 BC	Province of Artsakh of the Kingdom of Armenia 189 BC to 387 AD	Rome	(Artaxiad dynasty) Tigranes II of Armenia becomes a client king of Rome
53 BC	Province of Artsakh of the Kingdom of Armenia 189 BC to 387 AD	Persia (Arsacid dynasty) defeats Rome at the Battle of Carrhae	Armenia (Artaxiad dynasty) – Artavasdes II becomes king of Armenia.
36 BC	Province of Artsakh of the Kingdom of Armenia 189 BC to 387 AD	Rome	Mark Antony begins Parthian campaign Rebellion of King Zober of Albania defeated.
33 BC	Province of Artsakh of the Kingdom of Armenia 189 BC to 387 AD	Rome	Armenia (Artaxiad dynasty)
36	Province of Artsakh of the Kingdom of Armenia 189 BC to 387 AD	Iran (Arsacid dynasty)	
47	Province of Artsakh of the Kingdom of Armenia 189 BC to 387 AD		
51	Province of Artsakh of the Kingdom of Armenia 189 BC to 387 AD	Iberia (Pharnavazid dynasty)	
58	Province of Artsakh of the Kingdom of Armenia 189 BC to 387 AD	Armenia (Arsacid dynasty)	
62	Province of Artsakh of the Kingdom of Armenia 189 BC to 387 AD	Armenia (Arsacid dynasty)	Iran (Arsacid dynasty) Parthians under Vologases I invade Armenia, unsuccessfully besiege Romans in Tigranocerta.
63	Province of Artsakh of the Kingdom of Armenia 189 BC to 387 AD	Armenia (Arsacid dynasty)	Rome: Gnaeus Domitius Corbulo invades Armenia and defeats Tiridates I, who accepts Roman sovereignty. Parthia withdraws.
64	Province of Artsakh of the Kingdom of Armenia 189 BC to 387 AD	Armenia (Arsacid dynasty)	Iran (Arsacid dynasty)
114	Province of Artsakh of the Kingdom of Armenia 189 BC to 387 AD	Rome	Roman Armenia Emperor Trajan defeats the Parthians and overruns Armenia
118	Province of Artsakh of the Kingdom of Armenia 189 BC to 387 AD	Armenia (Arsacid dynasty)	
252	Province of Artsakh of the Kingdom of Armenia 189 BC to 387 AD	Iran (Sassanian dynasty)	Armenia (Arsacid dynasty)
287	Province of Artsakh of the Kingdom of Armenia 189 BC to 387 AD	Rome: Diocletian signs peace treaty with King Bahram II of Persia, installs the pro-Roman Arsacid Tiridates III as king in western Armenia.	Armenia (Arsacid dynasty)
363	Province of Artsakh of the Kingdom of Armenia 189 BC to 387 AD	Persia(Sassanian dynasty: Jovian cedes Corduene and Arzanene to Sassanids.	Corduene and Arzanene
363	Province of Artsakh of the Kingdom of Armenia 189 BC to 387 AD	Albania (Mihranid dynasty)	
376	Armenia (Arsacid dynasty)		
387	Iran (Sassanian dynasty)		
387	Albania (Mihranid dynasty)	with Sasanian help seizes from Armenia the entire right bank of the river Kura up to the river Araxes	includes Artsakh and Utik.
387	Division of Greater Armenia between Persia and Byzantium		
654	Arab Caliphate	Albania (Mihranid dynasty), al-Arminiya	
850	Artsakh		
884	Armenia (Bagratid dynasty)		Artsakh
1045	Artsakh		
1063	Seljuk Empire		Artsakh
1092	Eldiguzids		Artsakh
1124	Georgia (Bagratid dynasty)	Eldiguzids	Artsakh
1201	Georgia (Bagratid dynasty)	Armenia (Zakarid dynasty)	Artsakh
1214	Georgia (Bagratid dynasty)	Armenia (Zakarid dynasty)	Artsakh (Hasan-Jalalyan dynasty)
1236	Mongol Empire	Armenia (Zakarid dynasty)	Artsakh (Hasan-Jalalyan dynasty)
1256	Ilkhanate	Armenia (Zakarid dynasty)	Artsakh (Hasan-Jalalyan dynasty)
1261	Ilkhanate	Armenia (Zakarid dynasty)	Khachen (Hasan-Jalalyan dynasty)
1360	Ilkhanate	Karabakh	Khachen (Hasan-Jalalyan dynasty)
1337	Chobanids	Karabakh	Khachen (Hasan-Jalalyan dynasty)
1357	Jalayirids	Karabakh	Khachen (Hasan-Jalalyan dynasty)
1375	Kara Koyunlu	Karabakh	Khachen (Hasan-Jalalyan dynasty)
1387	Timurid Empire	Karabakh	Khachen (Hasan-Jalalyan dynasty)
1409	Kara Koyunlu	Karabakh	Khachen (Hasan-Jalalyan dynasty)
1468	Ak Koyunlu	Karabakh	Khachen (Hasan-Jalalyan dynasty)
1501	Iran (Safavid dynasty)	Province of Karabakh	Melikdoms of Karabakh (Khamsa) (Note: The Hasan-Jalalyan dynasty branches out sometime in the 16th century.)
1583	Ottoman Empire	Province of Karabakh	Melikdoms of Karabakh (Khamsa)
1603	Iran (Safavid dynasty)	Province of Karabakh	Melikdoms of Karabakh (Khamsa)
1725		Province of Karabakh	Melikdoms of Karabakh (Khamsa)
1736	Iran (Afsharid dynasty)	Province of Karabakh	Melikdoms of Karabakh (Khamsa)
1747		Karabakh Khanate	Melikdoms of Karabakh (Khamsa)
1751	Iran (Zand dynasty)	Karabakh Khanate	Melikdoms of Karabakh (Khamsa)
1797	Iran (Qajar dynasty)	Karabakh Khanate	Melikdoms of Karabakh (Khamsa)
1805-05 (Note: The Russian Empire occupies the lands, but they're formally annexed only in 1813 by the Treaty of Gulistan.)	Russia (Romanov dynasty)	Karabakh Khanate	Melikdoms of Karabakh (Khamsa)
1822	Russia (Romanov dynasty)		
1846	Russia (Romanov dynasty)	Shemakha Governorate (Note: Shemakha Governorate was renamed to Baku Governorate in 1859.)	
1868	Russia (Romanov dynasty)	Elisabethpol Governorate	
1917-11-11	Transcaucasian Commissariat	Elisabethpol Governorate	
1918-04-22	Transcaucasia (Note: The Transcaucasian Democratic Federal Republic was a multi-national entity established by Armenian, Azerbaijani and Georgian leaders.)	Elisabethpol Governorate	
28 May 1918	First Republic of Armenia: Declaration of independence		Armenian rebels
1918-06-04 (Note: Treaty of Batum)			Armenian rebels
1918-07-27	People's Government of Karabakh		
1918-09	Ottoman Empire		Azerbaijan (Shusha); Armenian rebels (other areas)
1918-10-30 (Note: Armistice of Mudros)	British Empire		Mountainous Karabakh was placed under the jurisdiction of Azerbaijan until the final delimitation agreement would be reached at the Paris Peace Conference.
1919-08-22 (Note: Seventh Assembly of Mountainous Karabakh)	British Empire		Mountainous Karabakh was placed under the jurisdiction of Azerbaijan until the final delimitation agreement would be reached at the Paris Peace Conference.
1919-08-23 (Note: British withdrawal.)			Mountainous Karabakh was placed under the jurisdiction of Azerbaijan until the final delimitation agreement would be reached at the Paris Peace Conference.
1920-03-04 (Note: Eighth Assembly of Mountainous Karabakh)	Azerbaijan		Azerbaijan (Shusha); Armenian rebels (other areas)
1920-04-09	Azerbaijan		Azerbaijan (Shusha, Khankendi, Askeran); Armenian rebels (other areas)
1920-04-13 (Note: General Dro (Drastamat Kanayan) takes parts of Mountainous Karabakh on behalf of the Republic of Armenia.)	Azerbaijan		Azerbaijan (Shusha, Khankendi, Askeran); Armenian rebels (other areas)
1920-04-22 (Note: Ninth Assembly of Mountainous Karabakh)	Azerbaijan		Azerbaijan (Shusha, Khankendi, Askeran); Armenian rebels (other areas)
1920-04-28 (Note: Azerbaijan is invaded by the Red Army.)	Azerbaijan		Azerbaijan (Shusha, Khankendi, Askeran); Armenian rebels (other areas)
1920-05-12	Red Army 11th Red Army advances into Armenia on 29 November 1920; transfer of power on 2 December in Yerevan.	Azerbaijan SSR	Azerbaijan SSR (Shusha, Khankendi, Askeran); Armenian rebels (other areas)
1920-05-26	Red Army 11th Red Army advances into Armenia on 29 November 1920; transfer of power on 2 December in Yerevan.	Azerbaijan SSR	The final status of Mountainous Karabakh was still being debated.
Dec. 1, 1920 (Note: Azerbaijan SSR's revolutionary committee declares Mountainous Karabakh to be transferred to Armenian SSR.)	Red Army 11th Red Army advances into Armenia on 29 November 1920; transfer of power on 2 December in Yerevan.	Azerbaijan SSR	The final status of Mountainous Karabakh was still being debated.
1921-07-04 (Note: Kavbiuro decides to leave Mountainous-Karabakh within Azerbaijan SSR.)	Red Army 11th Red Army advances into Armenia on 29 November 1920; transfer of power on 2 December in Yerevan.	Azerbaijan SSR	The final status of Mountainous Karabakh was still being debated.
1922-03-12	Red Army 11th Red Army advances into Armenia on 29 November 1920; transfer of power on 2 December in Yerevan.	Azerbaijan SSR, Transcaucasian SFSR	The final status of Mountainous Karabakh was still being debated.
1922-12-30	USSR	Azerbaijan SSR, Transcaucasian SFSR	
1923-07-07 (Note: Declared, and then implemented in November of 1924.)	USSR	Azerbaijan SSR, Transcaucasian SFSR	Nagorno-Karabakh Autonomous Oblast
1936-12-05	USSR	Azerbaijan SSR	Nagorno-Karabakh Autonomous Oblast
1991	First Nagorno-Karabakh War: Artsakh and Armenia; Azerbaijan		
1991-04-30 (Note: Operation Ring)	First Nagorno-Karabakh War: Artsakh and Armenia; Azerbaijan		
1991-09-02 (Note: The Armenians of the Nagorno-Karabakh Autonomous Oblast declare their independence.)	First Nagorno-Karabakh War: Artsakh and Armenia; Azerbaijan		
1991-11-26 (Note: Azerbaijan abolishes the Nagorno-Karabakh Autonomous Oblast.)	First Nagorno-Karabakh War: Artsakh and Armenia; Azerbaijan		
1994-05-12 (Note: Bishkek Protocol ceasefire.)	De facto Artsakh, de jure Azerbaijan		
2020-09-27	Second Nagorno-Karabakh War: Artsakh Armenia; Azerbaijan Turkey		
2020-11-10 (Note: 2020 Nagorno-Karabakh ceasefire agreement.)	Control over Nagorno-Karabakh is divided between Azerbaijan and Artsakh with Russian peacekeeping forces. Final status to be determined.		
September 2023 – January 2024	Dissolution of the Republic of Artsakh due to the 2023 Azerbaijani Offensive, followed by a refugee crisis in which nearly the entire population fled to Armenia.		

== See also ==
- History of Nagorno-Karabakh
- Timeline of Armenian history
- Timeline of modern Armenian history
