= History of Nagorno-Karabakh =

Nagorno-Karabakh is a region of West Asia located in the southern part of the Lesser Caucasus range, at the eastern edge of the Armenian Highlands, encompassing the highland part of the wider geographical region known as Karabakh. Under Russian and Soviet rule, the region came to be known as Nagorno-Karabakh, meaning "Mountainous Karabakh" in Russian. The name Karabakh itself (derived from Persian and Turkic and meaning "black vineyard") is first encountered in Georgian and Persian sources from the 13th and 14th centuries and refers to lowlands between the Kura and Aras rivers and the adjacent mountainous territory.

Following the collapse of the Soviet Union, most of this area came under the control of the de facto Artsakh Republic, which had economic, political, and military support from Armenia but has been internationally recognized as a de jure part of Azerbaijan. As a result of the 2020 war, all surrounding territories and some areas within Nagorno-Karabakh were taken back by Azerbaijan. On 1 January 2024, the Republic of Artsakh was dissolved.

== Ancient history ==
The region of Nagorno-Karabakh, located between the Kura and Araxes rivers, was once occupied by the people known to modern archaeologists as the Kura–Araxes. Little is known about the ancient history of the region, primarily because of a scarcity of historical sources.

The first mention of the territory of modern Nagorno-Karabakh is in the inscriptions of Sardur II, King of Urartu (763–734 BC), found in the village of Tsovk in Armenia, where the region is referred to as Urtekhini. There are no additional documents until the Roman epoch.

By the beginning of the Hellenistic period the population of Nagorno-Karabakh was not clear, some say that It was populated by mostly Armenian tribes, who have been native to the region according to the Armenian hypothesis, which has been backed up by genetical studies or who have settled there in the 7th century BC, while others say that the population of that time was neither Armenian nor even Indo-European, and that it was Armenized only in the aftermath of Armenian conquest. Robert Hewsen does not exclude the possibility of the Armenian Orontid dynasty exercising control over Nagorno-Karabakh in the 4th century BC, however, this hypothesis is disputed by many other scholars, who believe the extent of Orontid Armenia was limited to the vicinity of Lake Sevan.

Similarly, Robert Hewsen in his earlier work and Soviet historiography date the inclusion of Nagorno-Karabakh into an Armenian kingdom to the 2nd century BC.

== Legend of Aran ==
According to local traditions held by many people in the area, the two river valleys in Nagorno-Karabakh were among the first lands to be settled by Noah's descendants. According to a 5th-century CE Armenian tradition, a local chieftain named Aran (Առան) was appointed by the Parthian King Vologases I (Vagharsh I) as the first governor of this province. Ancient Armenian authors Movses Khorenatsi and Movses Kaghankatvatsi name Aran as the ancestor of the inhabitants of Artsakh and the neighboring province of Utik, the descendant of Sisak (the ancestor and eponym of the neighboring province of Sisakan, also transliterated Siunik). Through Sisak, Aran descended from Haik, the ancestor and eponym of all Armenians.

== Artsakh as province of the Kingdom of Armenia ==
Strabo characterizes "Orchistenê" (Artsakh) as "the area of Armenia with the greatest number of horsemen". It is unclear when Orchistenê became part of Armenia. Strabo, carefully listing all territorial gains of Armenian kings since 189 BC, does not mention Orchistenê, which indirectly shows that it probably was transferred to the Armenian empire from the Persian satrapy of Eastern Armenia. Ruins of the city of Tigranakert lie near the modern city of Aghdam. It is one of four cities with this name built in the beginning of 1 BC by the king of Armenia, Tigranes the Great. Recently Armenian archaeologists have conducted excavations at the site of this city. Fragments of a fortress, and also hundreds of artifacts, similar to those found in excavations in Armenia proper, have been unearthed. The outlines of a citadel and a basilica dating to the 5th–6th centuries AD have been revealed. Excavations have shown that the city existed from the 1st century BC to the 13th or 14th century AD.

Ancient inhabitants of Artsakh spoke a dialect of the Armenian language; this is attested by the author of an Armenian grammar, Stepanos Siunetsi, who lived around AD 700.

Strabo, Pliny the Elder, and Claudius Ptolemaeus all state that the border between Greater Armenia and Caucasian Albania was the river Cyrus (Kura). Authoritative encyclopedias on antiquity also name Kura as the southern border of Albania. Artsakh lies significantly to the south of this river. No contemporary evidence of its inclusion into Caucasian Albania or any other country exists until at least the end of the 4th century.

Armenian historian Faustus of Byzantium wrote that during the epoch of upheaval that followed the Persian invasion of Armenia around 370AD, Artsakh was one of the provinces that rose in revolt, while Utik was seized by the Caucasus Albanians. Armenian military commander Mushegh Mamikonian defeated Artsakh in a massive battle, took many prisoners and hostages, and imposed a tribute on the remaining population. In 372, Mushegh defeated the Caucasus Albanians, took Utik from them, and restored the border along the Kura, "as was earlier".

According to the Geography (Ashkharatsuyts) of 7th-century Armenian geographer Anania Shirakatsi, Artsakh was the 10th of 15 provinces (nahangs) of Armenia, and consisted of 12 districts (gavars):

- Myus Haband (Second Haband, as opposed to Haband of Siunik),
- Vaykunik (Zar),
- Berdadzor,
- Mets Arank,
- Mets Kvenk,
- Harjlank, Mukhank,
- Piank,
- Parsakank (Parzvank),
- Kusti,
- Parnes and
- Koght.

However Anania predicted that even during his time, Artsakh and the neighboring regions would "tear away from Armenia". This happened in 387, when Armenia was divided between the Roman Empire and Persia, and Artsakh and the Armenian provinces of Utik and Paytakaran were attached to Caucasian Albania. However Azerbaijani historian I. Aliev asserted that by 66 BC Armenian king Tigray II had relinquished most of greater Armenia, and by the end of the first century AD Utik and Artsakh were part of the Kingdom of Albania, whose southern border shifted to the Arax River.

== Mashtots and Aranshakhik period ==
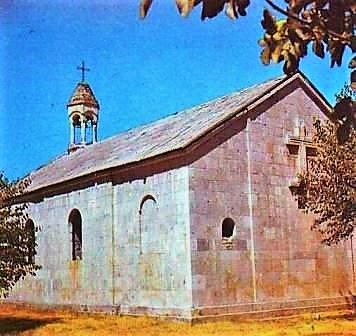
Amaras Monastery (4th century), the 19th-century Church of Saint Grigoris replacing destroyed older building

In the early 4th century Christianity spread in Artsakh. In 469 the Kingdom of Albania was transformed into a Sassanid Persian marzpanate (frontier province).

In the early 5th century Mesrop Mashtots created the Armenian alphabet and founded one of the first schools in Armenia at the Amaras Monastery in Artsakh, sparking a flourishing culture and national identity. In the 5th century the eastern part of Armenia – including Artsakh – remained under Persian rule. But in 451 the Armenians rebelled against the Persians' policy of compelling the practice of the Zoroastrian religion. Artsakh took part in this revolt, known as the Vardan war. Its cavalry particularly distinguished itself. After the Persians put the rebellion down, many Armenians took shelter in the impregnable fortresses and thick woods of Artsakh to continue the fight, leading to the Treaty of Nvarsak in 484 affirming Armenia's right to freely practise Christianity.

At the end of the 5th century, Artsakh and neighboring Utik united under the rule of the Aranshakhiks headed by Vachagan III (487–510s), also known as Vachagan the Pious. During his reign culture and science continued to blossom in Artsakh. According to a contemporary, as many churches and monasteries were built in the land in those years as there are days in a year. At the turn of the 7th century the Albanian marzpanate broke up into several smaller principalities. In the south, Artsakh and Utik formed an Armenian principality under the Aranshakhiks. In the 7th century the Migranians or Mihranids replaced the Aranshakhiks. A dynasty of Persian origin, they became associated with the Aranshakhiks, turned to Christianity and Armenicized.

In the 7th and 8th centuries a distinctive Christian culture took shape. The monasteries at Amaras, Orek, Katarovank, Djrvshtik and others acquired a significance that transcended the local area and spread across Armenia.

== Armenian princedoms of Dizak and Khachen ==
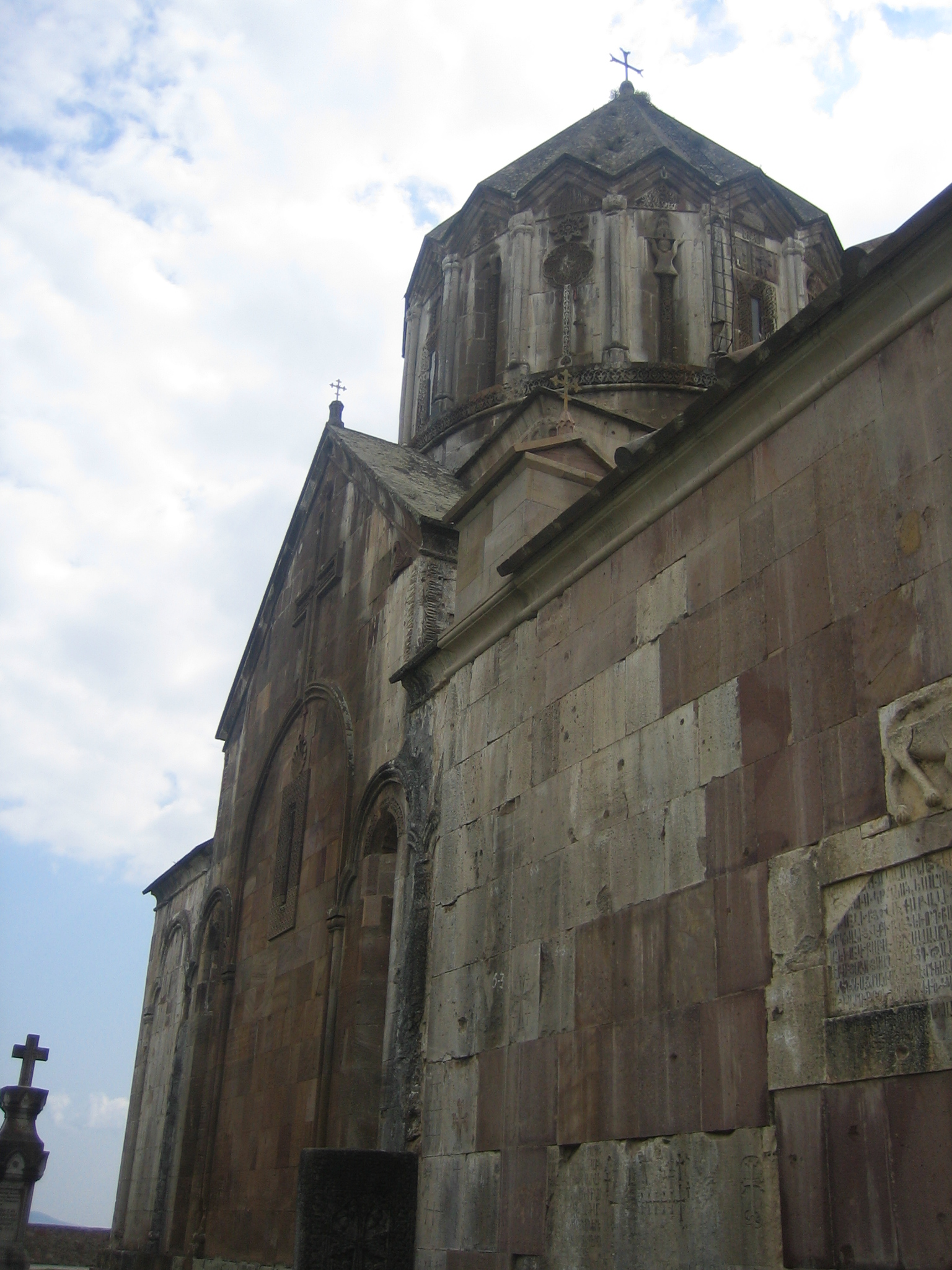
Gandzasar Monastery (13th century), northern side of the church

From the beginning of the 9th century, the Armenian princely houses of Khachen and Dizak were storing up strength. In 821, Amaras was plundered by Arab invaders, then restored by an opponent of the Caliphate – Yesai Arranshahik (Armenian: Եսայի Առանշահիկ, Yesai Abu-Muse in Arabic sources), ruler of Dizak, whose battle against invaders and restoration of Amaras are told in Tovma Artsruni's 9th century History of the House of Artzrunik. The prince of Khachen, Sahl Smbatean, clashed with Arab invaders beginning in 822, when they invaded Amaras.

In the medieval period architecture flourished, particularly religious buildings such as the Church of Hovanes Mkrtich (John the Baptist) and its vestibule at the Gandzasar Monastery, built 1216–1260; the ancient residence of the Catholicos of Albania, best known among scholars for its richly decorated dome, the Dadivank Monastery Cathedral Church (1214), and the Gtichavank cathedral (1241–1248). These churches are considered masterpieces of Armenian architecture.

== Seljuks, Mongols and Safavids ==
In the 11th century the Seljuk invasion swept the Middle East, including Transcaucasia. Nomadic Oghuz Seljuk tribes that came with this invasion became a dominant constituent of the ancestry of modern Azerbaijanis. From then until the beginning of the 20th century these tribes used mountainous Karabakh as their summer pastures, where they stayed for four or five of the warmer months of the year, and in fact owned the region.

In the 12th and 13th century the Armenian Zakarian dynasty took control over the Khachen, but its sovereignty was brief.

For 30–40 years of the 13th century the Tatar and Mongols conquered Transcaucasia. The efforts of the Artsakh-Khachen prince Hasan-Jalal succeeded in partially saving the land from destruction. However after his death in 1261, Khachen did become subject to Tatars and Mongols. The situation became still worse in the 14th century when the subsequent Turkic federations, the Qara Koyunlu and Aq Qoyunlu, replaced the Tatars and Mongols.

Nomadic presence in Artsakh and the plains to the east of it continued in this period as well. The vast area between the rivers of Kura and Araxes received its Turkic name Karabakh (combination of "black" (Kara) in Turkic and "garden" (bakh) in Persian) with Artsakh corresponding to its mountains (Mountainous Karabakh or Nagorno-Karabakh in the Soviet tradition).

The name is first mentioned in the thirteenth and fourteenth centuries in The Georgian Chronicles (Georgian: ქართლის ცხოვრება "Life of Kartli"), and in the geographical work of Hamdallah Mustawfi Nuzhat al-Qulub. The name became common after the 1230s when the region was conquered by the Mongols.

In the beginning of the 16th century Karabakh was conquered by the Safavid Empire, which created Safavid Karabakh there, with some additional nearby territory, and centered it in the city of Ganja. In this period Karabakh nomads coalesced in the igirmi-dörd (literally, 'twenty-four' in Azerbaijani) and otuz-iki ('thirty-two') confederations that were among the key allies of the Safavids in this part of their empire. Christian Armenian denizens of Karabakh paid higher taxes.

The centuries-long subjection of the local Armenians to Muslim leaders, their relations with Turkic tribal elders and frequent Turkic-Armenian-Iranian intermarriage resulted in Armenians adopting elements of Perso-Turkic Muslim culture, such as language, personal names, music, an increasingly humble position for women and, in some cases, even polygamy.

== Armenian melikdoms ==
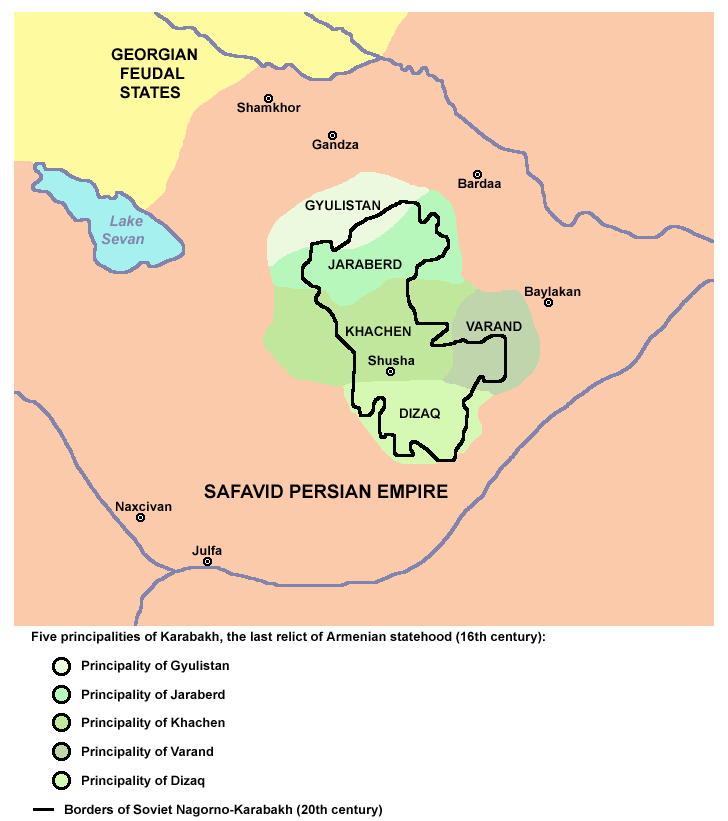
Five principalities of Karabakh (Gyulistan, Jaraberd, Khachen, Varand, Dizaq), the last relict of Armenian statehood (16th century)

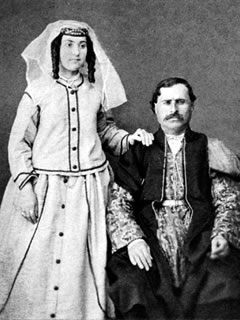
Early 20th-century Armenian family in Karabakh

The princedom of Khachen existed until the 16th–17th century then broke up into five small principalities ("melikdoms"):

1. Giulistan or Talish melikdom included the territory from Ganja to the River Tartar.
2. Dzraberd or Charaberd melikdom stretched from the River Tartar to the River Khachenaget.
3. Khachen melikdom went from the River Khachenaget to the River Karkar.
4. Varanda melikdom included the territory from the Karkar to the south side of Mount Kirs.
5. Dizak melikdom stretched from the southern slope of Mount Kirs to the River Arax.

These melikdoms were referred to as khamsa, which means "five" in Arabic. While subordinate to Safavid Persia's Karabakh beylerbeylik, ruled by Ziyad-oglu Qajars, the Armenian meliks were granted a wide autonomy over Upper Karabakh, maintaining quasi-autonomous control over the region for four centuries, while still remaining under Persian domination. In the early 18th century, Persia's military genius and new ruler, Nadir Shah, took Karabakh away from the Ganja Khanate to retaliate for their support of the Safavids, and placed the region directly under his own control. At the same time, the Armenian meliks were granted command over neighboring Armenian principalities and Muslim khans in the Caucasus, in return for the meliks' victories over the invading Ottoman Turks in the 1720s.

According to some historiographers of the 18th century, of those five meliks, only melik-Hasan-Jalalyans, the rulers of Khachen, were residents of Karabakh. The melik-Beglaryans of Gulistan were native Utis from the village of Nij in Shirvan; melik-Israelyans of Jraberd were descendants of the melik of Siunik to the south-east and hailed from the village of Magavuz in Zangezur; melik Shahnazars of Varanda hailed from the region of Armenian Gegharkunik to the east and received the title of meliks from Shah Abbas I in reward for their services; Melik-Avanyans of Dizak were descendants of the meliks of Lori, an Armenian princedom to the north-west. Modern western scholar Robert Hewsen and Cyril Toumanoff have demonstrated that all of these meliks were descendants of the House of Khachen.

The idea of Armenian independence in Karabakh from Persia first arose at the end of the 17th century thanks to the meliks. Parallel with the armed struggle, Armenians of that period made diplomatic efforts, at first turning to Europe, then to Russia. Such political and war leaders as Israel Ori, archimandrite Minas, the Catholicos of Gandsasar Yesai Jalalian, the iuzbashis (commanders of hundred; the capitans) Avan Yuzbashi and Tarkhan became leaders of the people.

The political instability in Persia in the 18th century created a threat to its integrity. Both Turkey and Russia expected to get a share from the possible breakup of Persia, Turkey for this purpose enlisting the support of the Dagestan mountain people, Russia seeking support among Armenians and Georgians.

In 1722, Peter the Great's Russo-Persian War (1722–23) began. At the very beginning, Russian forces succeeded in occupying Derbent and Baku. Armenians, encouraged by the Russians, united with Georgia and gathered an army in the Karabakh. However their hopes were deceived. Instead of the promised help, Peter the Great advised the Armenians of Karabakh to leave their homes and move to Derbent, Baku, Gilan, or Mazandaran, where Russian power had recently been established in the war. Khanates attached to Caspia, Russia signed a treaty with Turkey on July 12, 1724, giving the latter a free hand in the whole Transcaucasus as far as Shamakha.

That year Ottoman troops invaded. Their main victims were the Karabakh Armenian population, who, headed by meliks, rose to struggle for their independence, never having received the promised support from the Russian side. Yet, Peter the Great's march gave a new impulse to the struggle of the Armenians.

In the 1720s the host formed in Karabakh concentrated in three military camps or Skhnakhs (fortified place). The first of these, called the Great Skhnakh, was in the Mrav Mountains near the Tartar River. The second, Pokr (Minor) Skhnakh, was on the slope of Mount Kirs in the province of Varanda, and the third, in the province of Kapan. Shkhnakhs, i.e. the Armenian host, possessed absolute power. They were a people's army with the council of military leaders and the Catholicos of Gandsasar also entering it and having a great influence. Proceeding from the demands of wartime, meliks shared their power with iuzbashis, all of them having equal rights and obligations at the military councils. The Armenian host headed by Catholicos Yesai and the iuzbashis Avan and Tarkhan resisted the Ottoman regular army for a long time.

In 1733, the Armenians, encouraged Nadir Shah of Persia, on one special appointed day massacred all Ottoman army troops in their winter quarters in Khamsa. After that the former status of the area was restored.

In gratitude for services rendered, Nadir Shah freed the Khamsa meliks from the Ganja khans and appointed over them as ruler Avan, melik Dizak, a primary leader of the conspiracy of 1733, giving him the title of khan. However, Avan Khan soon died.

== Karabakh khanate ==
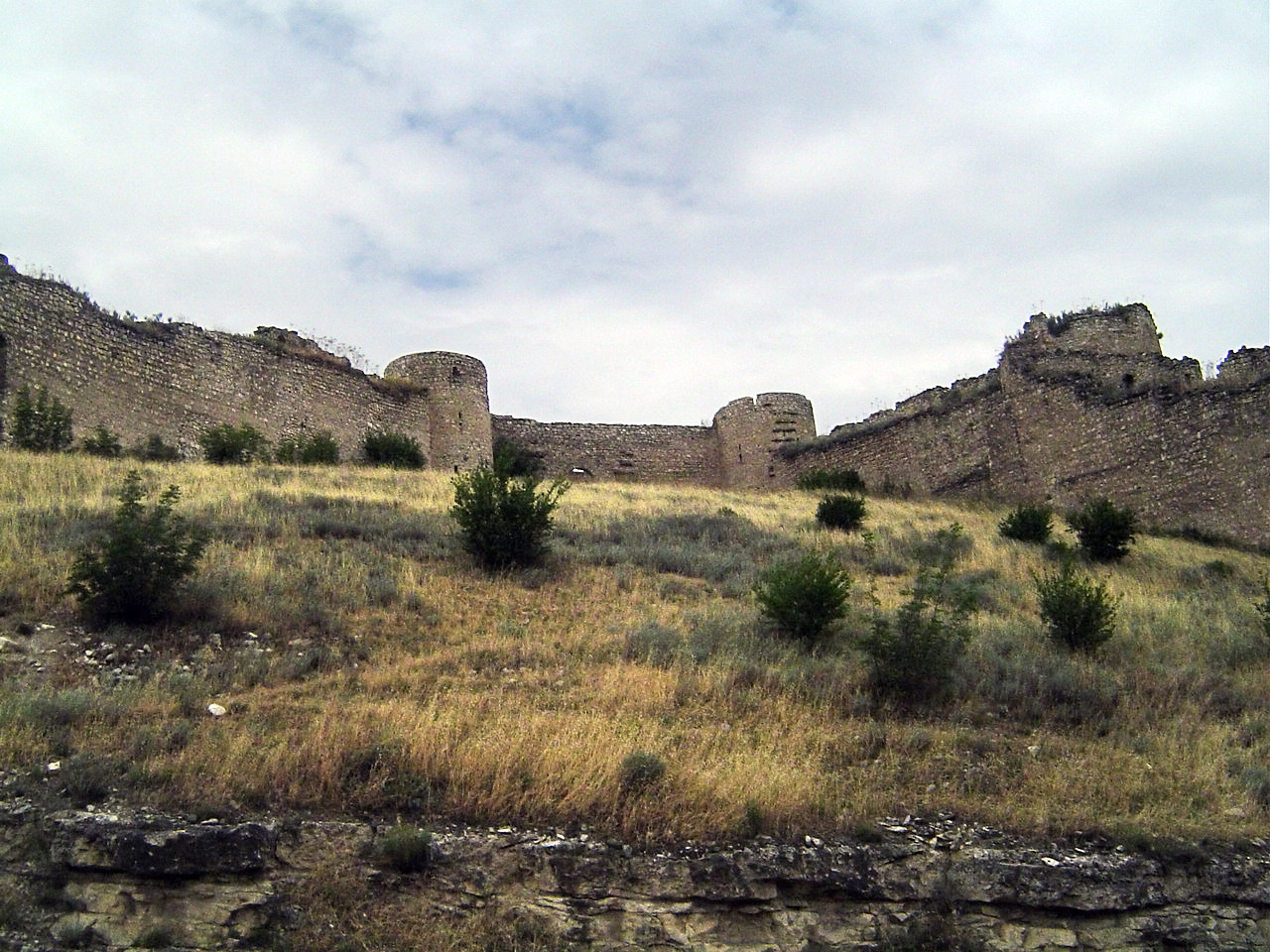
Askeran Fortress, built by Panah Ali Khan, 18th century

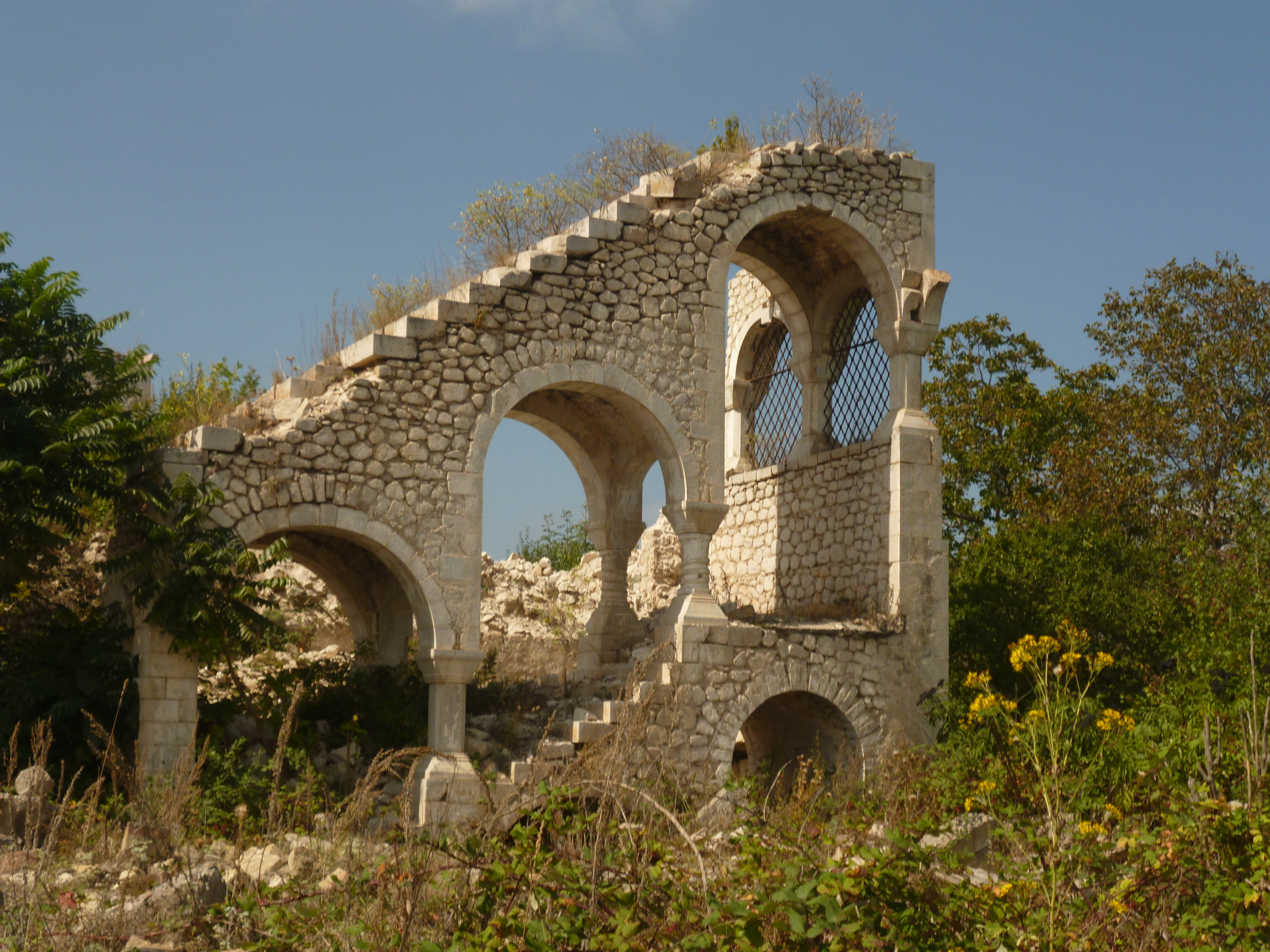
Remnants of the Palace of Shusha Khans, 18th–19th centuries

In 1747, Turkic ruler Panah Ali Khan Javanshir from the Azeri Javanshir clan, by then already a successful naib and royal gérant de maison, found himself displeased with Nader Shah's attitude towards him during the latter's later years of rule, and having gathered many of those deported from Karabakh in 1736 returned to his homeland. Due to his reputation as a skillful warrior and his wealthy ancestor's legacy in Karabakh, Panah Ali proclaimed himself and was soon recognized throughout most of the region as a ruler (khan). The Shah sent troops to bring back the runaways, however the order was never fulfilled: Nader Shah himself was killed in Khorasan in June of the same year. The new ruler of Persia, Adil Shah issued a firman (decree) recognizing Panah Ali as the Khan of Karabakh.

Melik of Varanda Shahnazar II, who was at odds with other meliks, was the first to accept the suzerainty of Panakh Khan. Panakh Khan founded the fortress of Shusha at a location recommended by Melik Shahnazar and made it the capital of Karabakh khanate.

Agha Mohammad Khan of the Qajar dynasty reasserted firm Iranian suzerainty in the region and all of the wider Caucasus region. However, he was assassinated some years afterwards, increasing political unrest in the region.

The meliks did not wish to reconcile themselves to the new situation. They desperately hoped for the aid of the Russians and sent letters to Catherine II of Russia and her favorite, Grigori Potyomkin. Potyomkin gave orders, that "at an opportunity its (Ibrahim-khans of Shusha) area which is made of people Armenian to give in board national and thus to renew in Asia the Christian state". But khan Ibrahim Khalil Khan, the son of Panakh-khan, learned of this. In 1785 he arrested the Dzraberd, Gulistan and Dizak meliks, plundered Gandzasar monastery, and imprisoned and poisoned its Catholicos. As a result of this the Khamsa melikdoms finally broke down.

Ibrahim Khalil Khan, the son of Panah Ali Khan, made the Karabakh khanate a semi-independent princedom, which only nominally recognized Persian rule.

In 1797, Karabakh suffered the invasion of armies of Persian shah Agha Mohammad Khan Qajar, who had just recently dealt with his Georgian subjects in the Battle of Krtsanisi. Shusha was besieged, but Agha Mohammad Khan Qajar was killed in his tent by his own servants. In 1805 Ibrahim-khan signed the Treaty of Kurakchay with Imperial Russia, represented by the Russian commander-in-chief in the war against Pavel Tsitsianov, under which Karabakh Khanate became a protectorate of Russia and the latter undertook to maintain Ibrahim-Khalil Khan and his descendants as the ruling dynasty of Karabakh. However the following year Ibrahim-Khalil was killed by the Russian commandant of Shusha, who suspected that the khan was trying to flee to Persia. Russia appointed Ibrahim-Khalil's son Mekhti-Gulu as his successor.

In 1813, the Karabakh Khanate, Georgia, and Dagestan became possessions of Imperial Russia by the Treaty of Gulistan in 1813, then the rest of Transcaucasia became part of the Empire in 1828 under the Treaty of Turkmenchay, following two Russo-Persian Wars in the 19th century. In 1822, Mekhti-khan escaped to Persia, and returned in 1826 with Persian armies to invade Karabakh. But they could not take Shusha, fiercely defended by Russians and Armenians, and were expulsed by the Russian general Valerian Madatov, himself an Armenian from Karabakh by origin. The Karabakh Khanate was dissolved, and the area became part of the Caspian oblast, and then of the Elizavetpol governorate within the Russian Empire.

== Russian rule ==
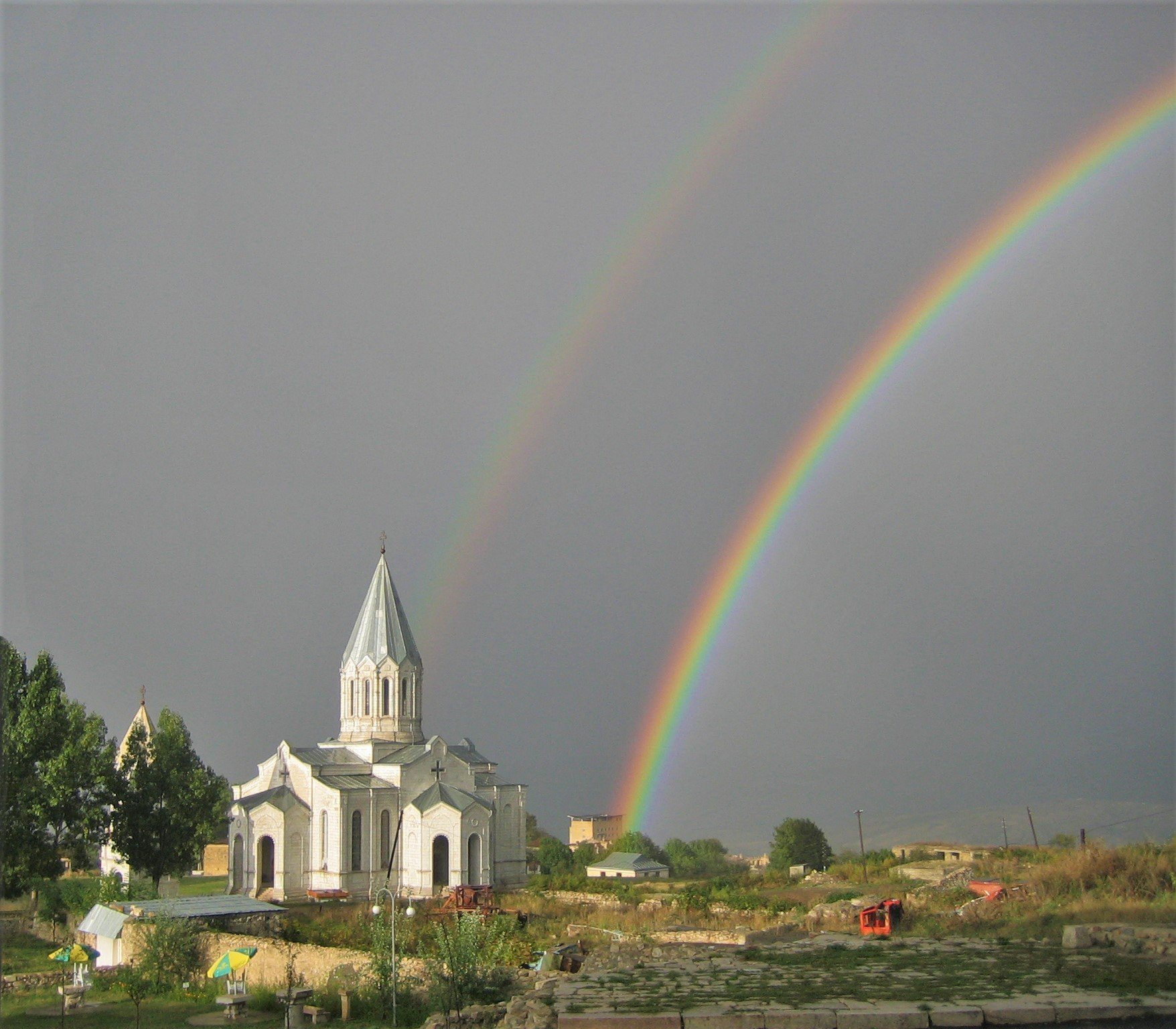
Construction of the Ghazanchetsots Cathedral in Shushi was completed in 1887.

The Russian Empire annexed the Karabakh Khanate in 1806 and consolidated its power over the area following the Treaty of Gulistan in 1813 and Treaty of Turkmenchay of 1828. Following two Russo-Persian wars, Persia recognized the Karabakh Khanate and many other khanates as part of the Russian Empire.

Russia dissolved the Karabakh khanate in 1822. A survey prepared by the Russian imperial authorities in 1823, a year later, and several years before the 1828 Armenian migration from Persia to the newly established Armenian Province, shows that all Armenians of Karabakh compactly resided in its highland portion, i.e. on the territory of the five traditional Armenian principalities, and constituted an absolute demographic majority on those lands. The survey's more than 260 pages recorded that the district of Khachen had twelve Armenian villages and no Tatar (Muslim) villages; Jalapert (Jraberd) had eight Armenian villages and no Tatar villages; Dizak had fourteen Armenian villages and one Tatar village; Gulistan had two Armenian and five Tatar villages; and Varanda had twenty-three Armenian villages and one Tatar village. Only 222 Armenians migrated to lands that were part of the Karabakh province in 1840.

During the 19th century, Shusha became one of the most significant cities of Transcaucasia. By 1900 Susha was the fifth city by size of Transcaucasia; it had a theatre, printing houses, etc.; manufacture of carpets and trade were especially developed, having been there for a long time. According to the first Russian-held census of 1823, conducted by Russian officials Yermolov and Mogilevsky, Shusha had 1,111 (72.5%) Azerbaijani families and 421 (27.5%) Armenian families. The census of 1897 showed 25,656 inhabitants, 56.5% of them Armenian and 43.2% Azerbaijani.

During the first Russian revolution in 1905, bloody armed clashes between Armenians and Azerbaijanis took place in the fields.

== October Revolution, 1917 ==
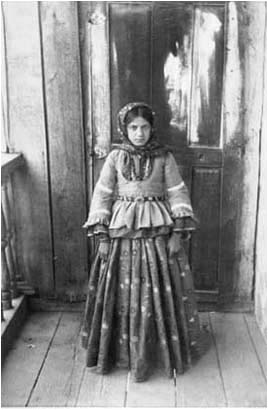
Azeri woman from Shusha in traditional garments.

The Russian Provisional Government established after the Russian Revolution of 1917 lasted only until the Bolshevik revolution but Grand Duke Nicholas and the Special Transcaucasian Committee (особый Закавказский Комитет (ОЗАКОМ), osobyy Zakavkazskiy Komitet (OZAKOM)) established the Transcaucasian Democratic Federative Republic, of which Karabakh became a part.

Following the October Revolution, a government of the local Soviet, led by ethnic Armenian Stepan Shaumyan, was established in Baku: the National Council of Baku (November 1917 – July 31, 1918).

The Armenians, under Russian control, held a national congress in October 1917. The convention in Tiflis, with delegates from the former House of Romanov, ended in September 1917. The Muslim National Councils (MNC) passed a law to organize defense and devised a local control and administrative structure for Transcaucasia. The Council also selected a 15-member permanent executive committee, known as the Azerbaijani National Council.

== 1918–1921 Armenian–Azerbaijani dispute ==
Through 1918–1919, Mountainous Karabakh was under the de facto administration of the local Armenian Karabakh Council, supported by the region's overwhelmingly Armenian population. Azerbaijan tried several times to assert authority over the region. The British governor of Baku, Lieutenant General Thomson, appointed Dr. Khosrov bey Sultanov governor-general of Karabakh and Zangezur, intending to annex Karabakh into Azerbaijan. In 1919, under threat of extermination (demonstrated by the Khaibalikend massacre), the Karabakh Council agreed under duress to provisionally recognize and submit to Azerbaijani jurisdiction until its status could be decided at the Paris Peace Conference in 1919.

=== Independent states, May 1918 ===
In May 1918 the Transcaucasian Republic dissolved into separate states:

- Democratic Republic of Armenia
- Azerbaijan Democratic Republic
- Georgian Democratic Republic

Both Armenia and Azerbaijan claimed Mountainous Karabakh and had strong rationales for doing so.

Armenia regarded Mountainous Karabakh as its natural frontier, the easternmost part of the Armenian Plateau, sharply contrasted with the Azerbaijani steppes to the east, so losing Karabakh would destroy the physical unity of Armenia. Armenia also appealed to the historical ties of Karabakh to Armenia as the last stronghold of Armenian statehood and the cradle of Armenian nationalism in the modern era. Armenians constituted a majority in the mountainous parts of Karabakh. Strategically Armenia considered Karabakh a barrier between Azerbaijan and Turkey.

Similarly, Azerbaijan appealed to history, as despite having had some degree of autonomy, Mountainous Karabakh had been part of the Muslim khanates of Ganja and Karabakh. Demographically Azeri constituted a majority in seven of eight uyezds of Elisabethpol guberniia and even in the heart of Mountainous Karabakh, Muslim Azeris and Kurds formed a considerable minority. Thus, carving out pockets of Christians and adding them to Armenia seemed unjust to Azerbaijan, illogical and deleterious to the welfare of all concerned. Azerbaijan did not see the steppes and mountains of Karabakh as separate, since tens of thousands of Azeri nomads circulated between them and if Highland and Lowland Karabakh were separated, these nomads would face certain ruin. Though never counted in the census, these nomads regarded Karabakh as their homeland. Strategically Mountainous Karabakh was important to Azerbaijan as well, since control of any other power over it would leave Azerbaijan very vulnerable. Economically Karabakh was tied to Azerbaijan, with almost every major road going eastward to Baku, not westward to Yerevan.

=== Ethnic and religious tension, March 1918 ===
In March 1918, ethnic and religious tension grew and Armenian-Azeri conflict began in Baku. The Bolsheviks and their allies accused the Musavat and Ittihad parties of Pan-Turkism. Armenian and Muslim militia engaged in armed confrontation, with the formally neutral Bolsheviks tacitly supporting the Armenians. As a result, between 3,000 and 12,000 Azerbaijanis and other Muslims were killed in what became known as the March Days. Muslims were expelled from Baku, or went underground. At the same time the Baku Commune engaged in heavy fighting with the advancing Ottoman Caucasian Army of Islam in and around Ganja. Major battles occurred in Yevlakh and Agdash, where the Turks routed and defeated Dashnak and Russian Bolshevik forces.

The government of Azerbaijan declared the annexation of Karabakh into the newly established Azerbaijan Democratic Republic of Baku and Yelizavetpol Gubernias. However, Nagorno-Karabakh and Zangezur refused to recognize the jurisdiction of the Azerbaijani Republic. The two Armenian uyezd (district) councils took power, organised and headed the struggle against Azerbaijan.

=== Armenian "People's Government", July 1918 ===
On July 22, 1918, the First Congress of the Armenians of Karabakh convened and declared the independence of Nagorno-Karabakh, elected the National Council and the people's government. The People's Government of Karabakh had five administrators:

- Foreign and internal affairs – Yeghishe Ishkhanian
- Military affairs – Harutiun Toumanian
- Communications – Martiros Aivazian
- Finances – Movses Ter-Astvatsatrian
- Agronomy and justice – Arshavir Kamalyan

The prime minister of the government was Yeghishe Ishkhanian, the secretary, Melikset Yesayan. The government published the newspaper Westnik Karabakha.

In September, at the 2nd Congress of the Armenians of Karabakh, the People's Government was renamed the Armenian National Council of Karabakh. In essence, however, its structure remained the same:

1. Justice Department – Commissar Arso Hovhannisian, Levon Vardapetian
2. Military Department – Harutiun Tumian (Tumanian)
3. Department of Education – Rouben Shahnazarian
4. Refugees Department – Moushegh Zakharian
5. Control Department – Anoush Ter-Mikaelian
6. Department of Foreign Affairs – Ashot Melik-Hovsepian.

On July 24, the Declaration of the People's government of Karabakh was adopted, which set forth the objectives of the newly established state power.

=== Armistice of Mudros, October 1918 ===
On October 31, 1918, the Ottoman Empire admitted defeat in World War I, and its troops retreated from Transcaucasia. British forces replaced them in December and took the area under their control.

=== British mission ===
The government of Azerbaijan tried to capture Nagorno-Karabakh with the help of the British. The new borders of Transcaucasia could not be defined without the agreement of Great Britain. Stating that the fate of the disputed territories must be solved at the Paris Peace Conference of 1919, the British command in reality did everything to incorporate Nagorno-Karabakh into Azerbaijan long before that. Establishing full control over the export of Baku oil, the British sought the secession of Transcaucasia from Russia; Azerbaijan, it was supposed, was to play a role of an advance post of the West in the South Caucasus and to create a barrier to the sovietization of the region.

The policy of the Allied powers on Transcaucasia had a pro-Azerbaijani bent. The Karabakhian problem was dragged out, on the calculation that the military-political situation would become favourable to Azerbaijan, with a change in the ethnic structure of Nagorno-Karabakh.

On January 15, 1919, the Azerbaijani government, with "the knowledge of the British command" appointed Khosrov bey Sultanov governor-general of Nagorno-Karabakh, simultaneously giving an ultimatum to the Karabakhian National Council to recognize the power of Azerbaijan. On February 19, 1919, the 4th Congress of the Armenian population of Karabakh convened in Shushi, and decisively rejected this ultimatum and protested the appointment of Sultanov as governor-general. The resolution adopted by the congress said: "Insisting on the principle of the self-determination of a people, the Armenian population of Karabakh respects the right of the neighbouring Turkish people to self-determination and, together with this, decisively protests against the attempts of the Azerbaijani government to eliminate this principle in relation to Nagorno-Karabakh, which never will concede to Azerbaijani power over it".

In the connection with the appointment of Sultanov the British mission came out with an official notification, which stated, that "by the British command's consent Dr. Khosrov Bek Sultanov is appointed provisional governor of Zangezur, Shusha, Jivanshir and Jebrail useds [sic]. The British Mission finds it necessary to confirm that belonging of the mentioned districts to one or another unit must be solved at a Peace Conference".

The National Council of Karabakh answered:

The National Council of the Armenians of Karabakh with its full complement, in common with the commanders of all the districts of Karabakh, having discussed the appointment of a general-governor by the government of Azerbaijan, came to the conclusion that Armenian Karabakh cannot accept this, as the Armenian people of Karabakh consider dependence on the government of Azerbaijan, in whatever form it might be, unacceptable due to the violence and violations of rights which the Armenian people has been systematically subjected to by the Azerbaijani government until recently ... Armenian Karabakh showed the whole world that it in fact did not recognize and does not recognize within its borders the power of the Azerbaijani government ... Since the British command recognizes Armenian Karabakh as a territory that is not subordinated to any state prior to the solution of the Peace Conference, therefore and in particular with respect to Azerbaijan, the National Council considers the appointment of a British general-governor the only acceptable form for the government of the Armenian Karabakh, and it asks the mission to solicit the Supreme English Command".

However in spite of the Karabakhi protests the British continued to assist and support the Azerbaijani government to incorporate Armenian Karabakh into Azerbaijan. The British troops' commander in Baku, Colonel Digby Shuttleworth stated to the Karabakhian people:

I warn that any excesses against Azerbaijan and its general-governor are carried out against England. We are strong enough to force you to obey".

=== Shusha, April 1919 ===
Unable to force Nagorno-Karabakh to its knees by threats or force, Schatelwort personally arrived in Shusha late in April 1919 to compel the National Council of Karabakh to recognize the power of Azerbaijan. On April 23 in Shusha, the Fifth Congress convened, and rejected Schatelwort's demands. The congress declared that

Azerbaijan has always acted as the helper and the accomplice in the atrocities carried out by Turkey concerning Armenians in general and Karabakhs of Armenians in particular.

It accused Azerbaijan of robbery, murder and hunting down Armenians on the roads, and said that it "aspire(d) to destroy Armenians as a unique cultural element, gravitating not to the East, but to Europe". Therefore, the resolution declared, any program having any attachment to Azerbaijan was unacceptable to Armenians.

Rejected by the Fifth Congress, Sultanov decided to subordinate Nagorno-Karabakh by force. Almost the entire army of Azerbaijan gathered at the Nagorno-Karabakh borders. At the beginning of June Sultanov tried to blockade the Armenian quarters of Shusha, attacked Armenian positions, and organized pogroms in order Armenian villages. Nomads under the leadership of Sultanov's brother completely massacred the villagers of Gayballu, 580 Armenians total. English troops withdrew from Nagorno-Karabakh to give the Azerbaijani troops a free hand.

The Sixth Congress of Karbaghi Armenians, which representatives of the English Mission and Azerbaijani government attended, was to discuss relations between Nagorno-Karabakh and Azerbaijan prior to the Peace Conference in Paris. However the English mission and the government of Azerbaijan arrived at the Congress after it had finished its work and negotiations did not take place. To find out whether Nagorno-Karabgh would be able to defend its independence in case of war, the Congress established a commission which came to the conclusion that the Karabakhians could not. Therefore the Congress, under the threat of armed assault from Azerbaijan, felt compelled to start negotiations.

=== Peace conference, August 1919 ===
Eager to gain time to gather its forces, the Congress convened on August 13, 1919 and concluded an agreement on August 22, under which Nagorno-Karabgh considered itself within the borders of the Azerbaijani Republic pending the solution of the problem at the Peace Conference in Paris. However the Azerbaijani armies were in peacetime status. Azerbaijan cannot enter into area of an army without the permission of National Council. Disarmament of the population stopped until the peace conference.

In February, Azerbaijan started to focus around Karabakh military and irregular groups. The Karabakh Armenians declared that Sultanov had "organized large gangs of Tatars, Kurds, prepare(d) grandiose massacre of Armenians (…) On roads kill travellers, rape women, steal the cattle. Proclaimed the economic blockade of Karabakh. Sultanov had demanded the entry of garrisons into the heart of Armenian Karabakh: Varanda, Dzraberd, and broken the agreement of VII Congress".

=== 1920–1921 ===
On February 19, 1920, Sultanov demanded that the National Council of the Karabakhi Armenians "urgently ... solve the question of the final incorporation of Karabakh into Azerbaijan". The Eighth Congress of Karabakhi Armenians from February 23 to March 4, 1920 rejected Sultanov's demand. The Congress accused Sultanov of numerous infringements of the peace agreement, entry of armies into Karabakh without the permission of the National Council and organizing murders of Armenians, in particular the massacre on February 22 in Khankendy, Askeran and on the Shusha-Evlakh road. Others argue that the wishes of the Azerbaijani population of Karabakh were not represented by Armenian inhabitants "who had no right to represent in its Congress the will of the entire population of the region" In accordance with the decision of the Congress the diplomatic and military representatives of the Allies, or Entente states, three Transcaucasian republics and the provisional governor-general were informed that "the repetition of these events will compel the Armenians of Nagorno-Karabakh to turn to the appropriate means for defense."

=== 1920 Nagorno-Karabakh War ===
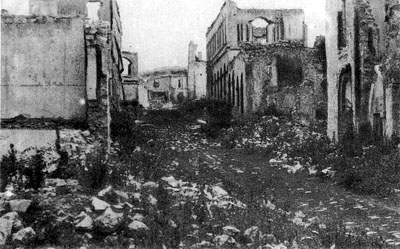
Ruins of the Armenian quarters of Shusha after being burned down by Tatars in March 1920

In March–April 1920 there was a short war between Azerbaijan and Armenia for Nagorno-Karabakh. It began on March 22 (Nowruz), when Armenian forces broke the armistice and unexpectedly attacked Atskeran and Khankendi. The Armenians assumed that the Azerbaijanians would be celebrating Nowruz and therefore would not be prepared to defend themselves, but their attack on the Azerbaijan garrison in Shusha failed because of poor coordination.

In response Azerbaijanis burned down the Armenian part of Shusha and massacred its population. "The most beautiful Armenian city has been destroyed, crushed to its foundations; we have seen corpses of women and children in wells", recollected Soviet communist leader Grigoriy Ordzhonikidze.

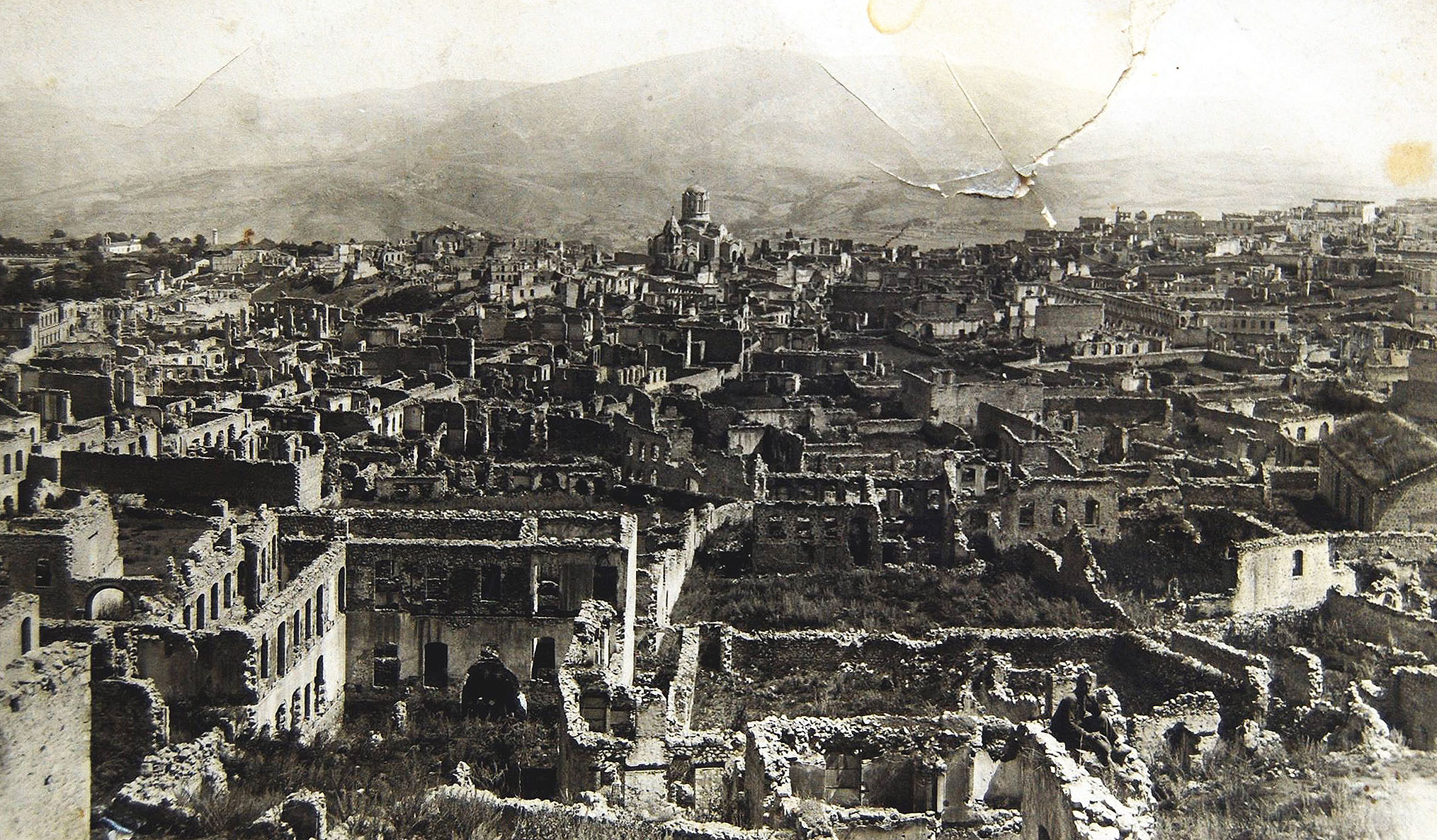
Aftermath of the Shusha massacre of the city's Armenian population: Armenian half of Shusha destroyed by Azerbaijani armed forces in 1920, with the defiled Armenian Cathedral of the Holy Savior on the background.

The massacre and expulsion of Shushi's majority Armenian population was the largest escalation of the conflict to date. Armenian sources give different numbers for Armenian casualties, from 500 persons in R. Hovannisian to 35,000; most say 20–30 thousand. Estimates for the number of the burned homes ranged from R. Hovannisian's two thousand to the more usual figure of seven thousand. According to the Greater Soviet Encyclopedia, 20% of the population of Nagorno-Karabakh was lost in the fighting. That amounts to 30,000, mostly Armenians, who were 94% of the population of the area.

The Paris Peace Conference did not resolve the Transcaucasian territorial disputes, so Armenia decided to liberate Karabakh from Azerbaijan. An uprising in Karabakh, timed to coincide with Azerbaijani Novruz celebrations, failed due to poor coordination. Azerbaijani garrisons remained in Shushi and neighboring Khankend, and a pogrom followed in Shusha. Azerbaijani soldiers and residents burned and looted half of the city, murdering, raping and expelling its Armenian inhabitants.

After the uprising, the Armenian government ordered its forces under Garegin Nzhdeh and Dro Kanayan to help the Karabakh rebels, and Azerbaijan moved its army west to crush the Armenian resistance and cut off any reinforcements, despite the threat of the approaching 11th Red Army of Bolshevik Russia from the north. By Azerbaijan's Sovietization barely a month after the uprising began, Azerbaijani forces were able to maintain control over the central cities of Karabakh, Shusha and Khankend, whilst its immediate surroundings were in the control of local partisans and Armenian army reinforcements. Since the Armenian government had explicitly ordered Dro not to engage the Red Army, he was unable to capture Shusha, where the Red Army had replaced its Azerbaijani defenders. Eventually the Bolshevik army overwhelmed the Armenian army detachments and drove them from the region. The fears of the Armenians of Karabakh were alleviated by virtue of returning to the stability of Russian control.

=== Armenian declaration, April 1920 ===
In April 1920, the Ninth Congress of the Karabakhi Armenians was held and proclaimed Nagorno-Karabakh part of Armenia. The concluding document reads:

1. "To consider the agreement, which was concluded with the government of Azerbaijan on behalf of the Seventh Congress of Karabakh, violated by the latter, in view of the organized attack of Azerbaijani troops on the civilian Armenian population in Shusha and villages.
2. To proclaim the joining of Nagorno-Karabakh to Armenia as an essential part of Armenia".

But, with the direct intervention of Russian troops, Azerbaijan regained control of the area.

== Soviet era, 1921–1991 ==
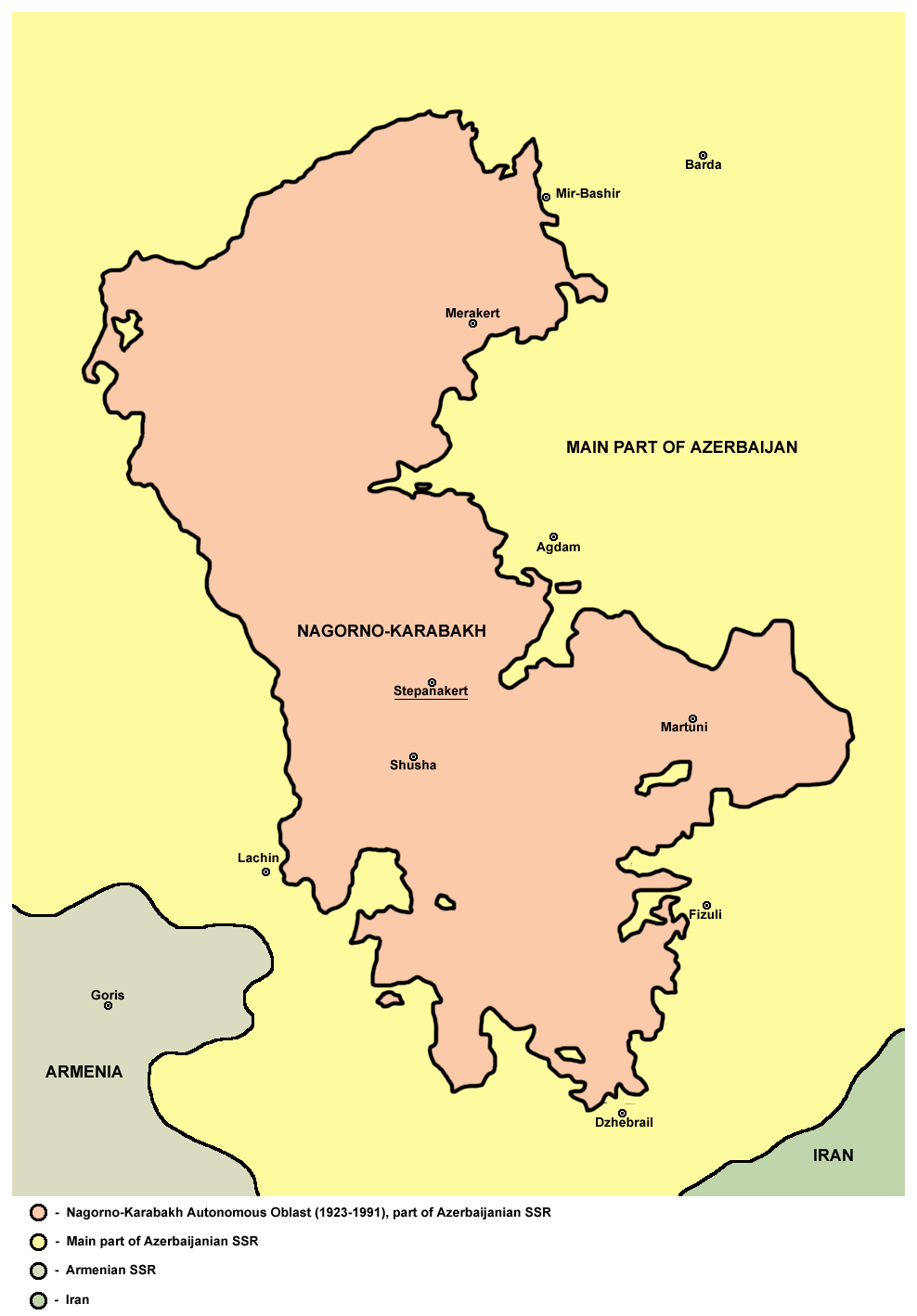
Map of Nagorno-Karabakh Autonomous Oblast with main cities shown

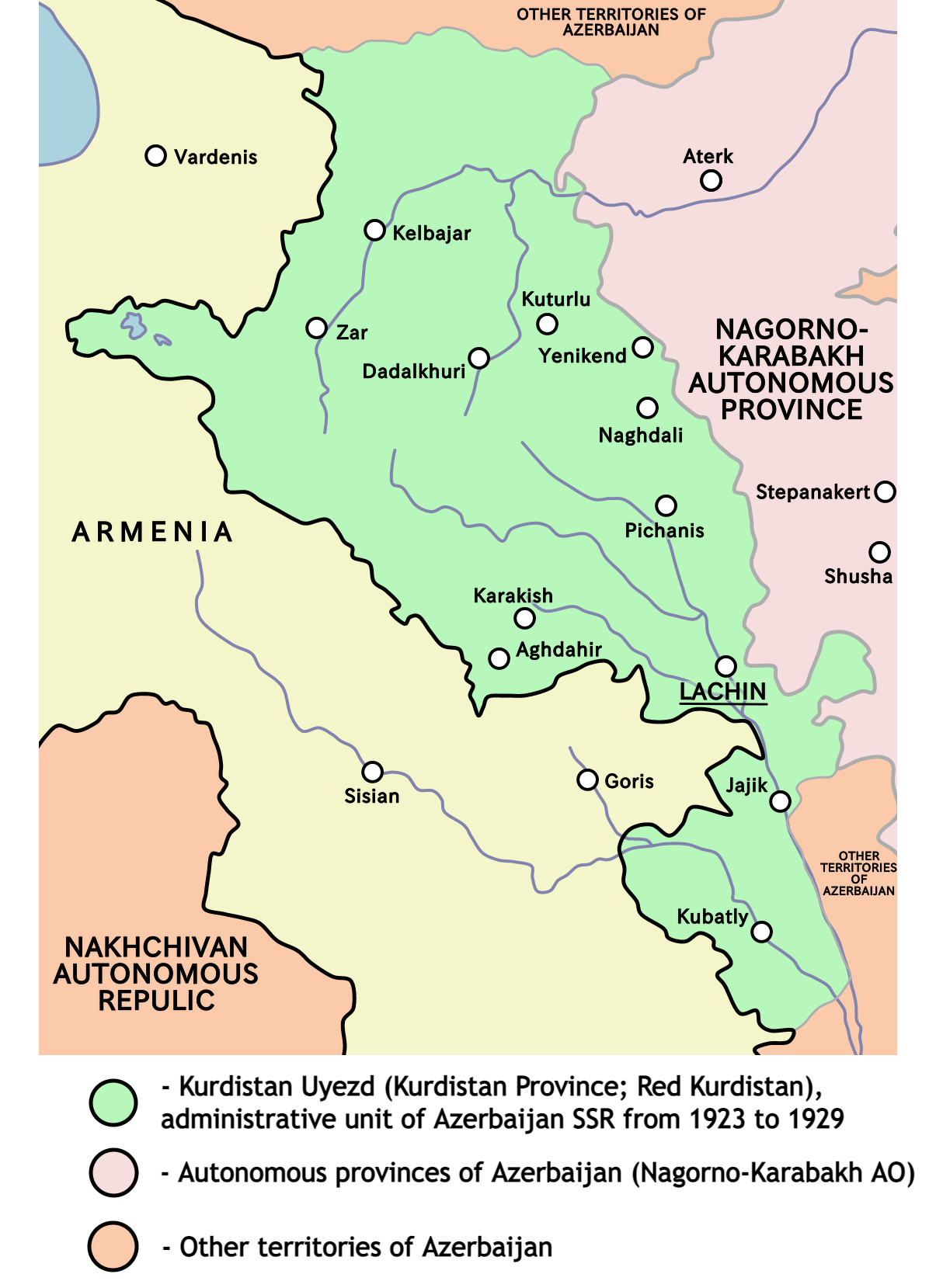
Map of Nagorno-Karabakh Autonomous Oblast and Kurdistani District in 1930

On July 4, 1921, the Plenum of the Caucasian Bureau of the Central Committee of the Communist Party of the Soviet Union voted to integrate Karabakh into Armenia. However, the next day, July 5, 1921, Joseph Stalin intervened to keep Karabakh in Soviet Azerbaijan. This decision was taken without local deliberation or plebiscite. As a result, the Nagorno-Karabakh Autonomous Oblast (NKAO) was established within the Azerbaijan SSR in 1923. Most of the decisions on the transfer of the territories, and the establishment of new autonomous entities, were made under pressure from Stalin. Armenians still blame him for this decision, made against their national interests.

The Soviet Union created the Nagorno-Karabakh Autonomous Region within Azerbaijan in 1924 when over 94 percent of the region's population was Armenian. (The term Nagorno-Karabakh originates from the Russian for 'mountainous Karabakh.') As the Azerbaijani population grew, the Karabakh Armenians chafed under the discriminatory rule, and by 1960 hostilities had begun between the two populations of the region.

— Azerbaijan, A Country Study. ISBN 1-4191-0862-X, US Library of Congress Federal Research Division

For 65 years of the NKAO's existence, the Karabakh Armenians felt they were restricted by Azerbaijan. Armenian discontent stemmed from Azerbaijan severing ties between the oblast and Armenia and pursuing a policy of cultural de-Armenization, planned Azeri settlement, squeezing the Armenian population out of the NKAO and neglecting its economic needs. The census of 1979 showed 162,200 inhabitants of Nagorno-Karabakh Autonomous Region, of whom 123,100 Armenians (75.9%) and 37,300 Azerbaijani (22.9%). Armenians compared this to the data from 1923 – 94% Armenian. In addition they noted that "as of 1980 in Nagorno-Karabakh 85 Armenian villages (30%) have been liquidated and no Azerbaijani villages at all." Armenians also accused the government of Azerbaijan of a "purposeful policy of discrimination and replacement". They believed that Baku's plan was to supersede absolutely all Armenians from Nagorno-Karabakh.

Azerbaijani residents of the NKAO, meanwhile, complained of discrimination by the Armenian majority of the autonomous oblast and of economic marginalization. Thomas De Waal in his Black Garden points out that NKAO was economically worse off than Armenia SSR. However, he noted elsewhere, economically Azerbaijan SSR overall had the most poverty in the South Caucasus. Nevertheless, NKAO's economic indicators were better than Azerbaijan's as a whole, a possible motivation for Karabakh Armenians to join Armenia SSR. When the dissolution of the Soviet Union began in the late 1980s and early 1990s, the question of Nagorno-Karabakh re-emerged. On February 20, 1988, the Oblast Soviet of the NKAO weighed up the results of an unofficial referendum on the reattachment of Nagorno-Karabakh to Armenia, held in the form of a petition signed by 80,000 people. On the basis of that referendum, the Oblast Soviet of Nagorno-Karabakh adopted appeals to the Supreme Soviets of the USSR, Azerbaijan, and Armenia, asking them to authorize the secession of Karabakh from Azerbaijan and its attachment to Armenia.

It caused indignation among the neighboring Azerbaijan population, which began to gather in crowds to go and "put things in order" in Nagorno-Karabakh. On February 24, 1988, a direct confrontation occurred on the border of Nagorno-Karabakh near Askeran, on the road between Stepanakert and Aghdam. It degenerated into a skirmish. These clashes left about 50 Armenians wounded, and a local policeman, according to information from International Historical-enlightenment Human rights Society – Memorial, an Azeri, shot and killed two Azerbaijanis – Bakhtiyar Guliyev, 16, and Ali Hajiyev, 23. On February 27, 1988, while speaking on Central TV, the USSR Deputy Prosecutor General A. Katusev mentioned the nationality of those killed. Within hours, a pogrom against Armenian residents began in the city of Sumgait, 25 km north of Baku, where many Azerbaijani refugees resided. The pogrom lasted for three days. The exact mortality is disputed. The official investigation reported 32 deaths – six Azerbaijanis and 26 Armenians, while the US Library of Congress put the number of Armenian victims at over 100.

A similar attack on Azerbaijanis occurred in the Armenian towns of Spitak, and Gugark, during the Gugark pogrom and others. Azerbaijani sources put the number of Azerbaijanis killed in clashes in Armenia at 216 total, including 57 women, five infants and 18 children of different ages. The KGB of Armenia, however, said that it had tracked the people from the Azerbaijani list-of-dead and that the majority of them had previously died, were living in other regions of the USSR, or died in the earthquake of 1988 in Spitak; the Armenian KGB said 25 had been killed – an initially unchallenged figure.

Large numbers of refugees left Armenia and Azerbaijan as pogroms began against the minority populations of each of the two countries. In the fall of 1989, intensified inter-ethnic conflict in and around Nagorno-Karabakh led Moscow to grant Azerbaijani authorities greater leeway in controlling that region. The Soviet policy backfired, however, when a joint session of the Supreme Soviet of the Armenian Soviet Socialist Republic and the National Council, the legislative body of Nagorno-Karabakh, proclaimed the unification of Nagorno-Karabakh with Armenia. In mid-January 1990, Azerbaijani protesters in Baku went on a rampage against the remaining Armenians there. Moscow intervened only after almost no Armenian population remained in Baku. It sent army troops, who violently suppressed the Azerbaijan Popular Front (APF) and installed Ayaz Mutallibov as president. The troops reportedly killed 122 Azerbaijanis in quelling the uprisining, in what became known as Black January, and Gorbachev denounced the APF for striving to establish an Islamic Republic.

In a December 1991 referendum, boycotted by most of the local Azerbaijanis, the Armenian population, still a majority in Nagorno-Karabakh, approved the creation of an independent state. However, the Constitution of the USSR was the instrument in accordance with which only the fifteen Soviet Republics could vote for independence and Nagorno-Karabakh was not one of the Soviet Republics. A Soviet proposal for enhanced autonomy for Nagorno-Karabakh within Azerbaijan satisfied neither side and subsequently led to the eruption of war between Armenia-backed Nagorno-Karabakh and Azerbaijan.

== First Nagorno-Karabakh War ==
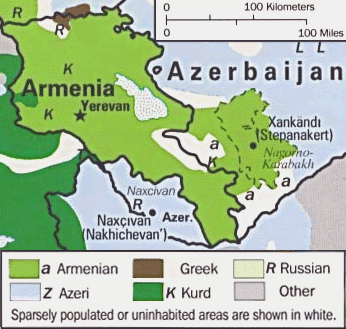
Ethnic groups of the region (CIA, 1995). (See entire map)

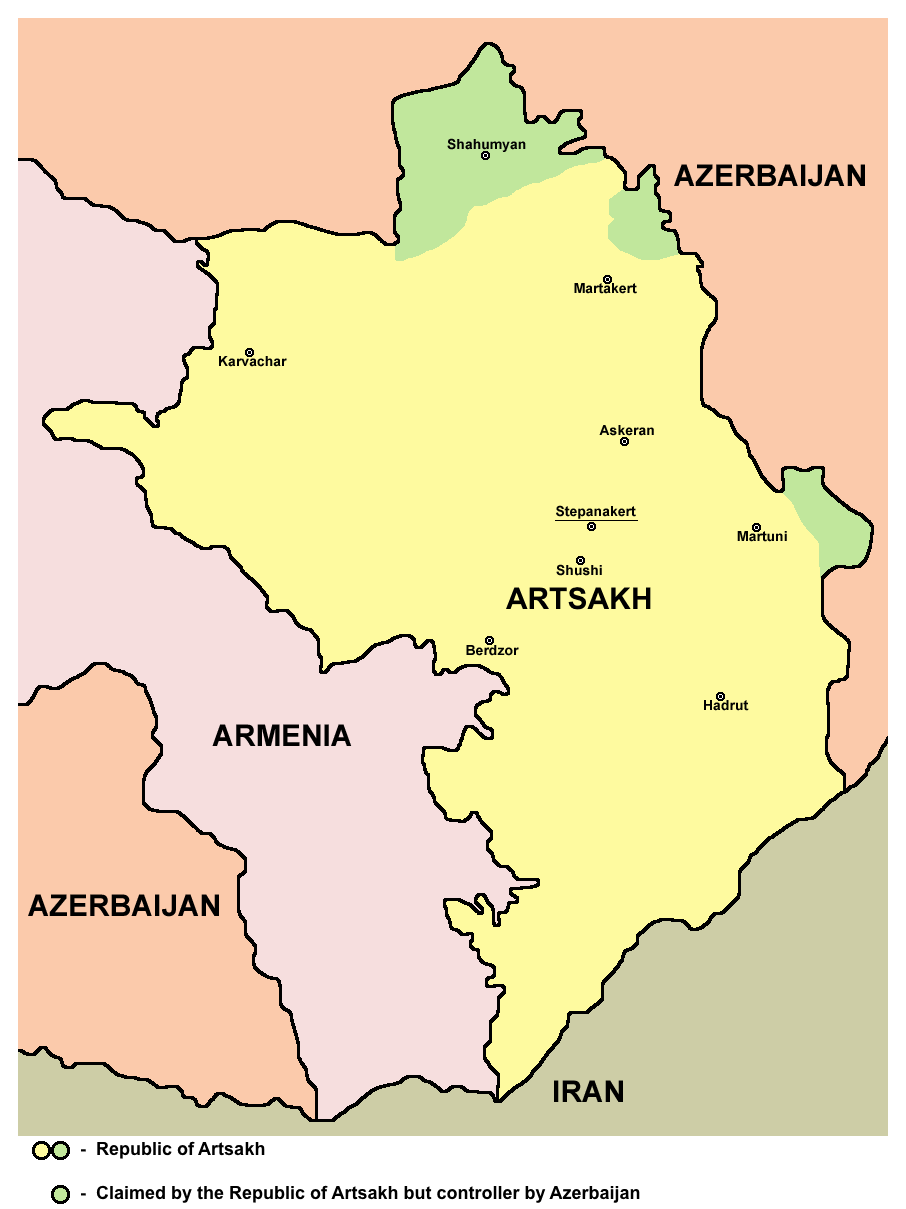
Map of the Republic of Artsakh in 1994-2020

The struggle over Nagorno-Karabakh escalated after both Armenia and Azerbaijan attained independence from the Soviet Union in 1991. In the post-Soviet power vacuum, military action between Azerbaijan and Armenia was heavily influenced by the Russian military. Extensive Russian military support was exposed by the Head of the Standing Commission of the Russian Duma, General Lev Rokhlin. He claimed that munitions worth one billion US dollars had been illegally transferred to Armenia between 1992 and 1996. According to Armenian news agency Noyan Tapan, Rokhlin openly lobbied for the interests of Azerbaijan. According to The Washington Times, Western intelligence sources said that the weapons played a crucial role in Armenia's seizure of large areas of Azerbaijan. Other Western sources disputed that assessment, because Russia continued to provide military support to Azerbaijan as well throughout the military conflict. Russian Minister of Defense Igor Rodionov in his letter to Aman Tuleyev, Minister of cooperation with CIS countries, said that a Defense Ministry commission had determined that a large quantity of Russian weapons, including 84 T-72 tanks and 50 armored personnel carriers, were illegally transferred to Armenia between 1994 and 96, after the ceasefire, for free and without authorization by the Russian government. The Washington Times article suggested that Russia's military support for Armenia was intended to force "pro-Western Azerbaijan and its strategic oil reserves into Russia's orbit". Armenia officially denied any such weapons delivery.

Both sides used mercenaries. Mercenaries from Russia and other CIS countries fought on the Armenian side, and some of them were killed or captured by the Azerbaijan army. According to The Wall Street Journal, Azerbaijani President Heydər Əliyev recruited thousands of mujahedeen fighters from Afghanistan and mercenaries from Iran and elsewhere, and brought in even more Turkish officers to organize his army. The Washington Post discovered that Azerbaijan hired more than 1,000 guerrilla fighters from Afghanistan's radical prime minister Gulbuddin Hekmatyar. Meanwhile, Turkey and Iran supplied trainers, and the republic also was aided by 200 Russian officers who taught basic tactics to Azerbaijani soldiers in the northwest city of Barda. Chechen warlord Shamil Basayev, generally considered a notorious terrorist, personally engaged Armenian forces in NKR. According to EurasiaNet, unidentified sources have stated that Arab guerrilla Ibn al-Khattab joined Basayev in Azerbaijan between 1992 and 1993, although that is dismissed by the Azerbaijani Ministry of Defense. In addition, officers from the Russian 4th Army participated in combat missions for Azerbaijan on a mercenary basis.

According to Human Rights Watch,

From the beginning of the Karabakh conflict, Armenia provided aid, weapons, and volunteers from Russia. In February 1992, 161 ethnic Azerbaijani civilians were murdered by ethnic Armenian armed forces in what is known as the Khojaly Massacre. Armenian involvement in Karabakh escalated after a December 1993 Azerbaijani offensive. The Republic of Armenia began sending conscripts and regular Army and Interior Ministry troops to fight in Karabakh. In January 1994, several active-duty Armenian Army soldiers were captured near the village of Chaply, Azerbaijan. To bolster the ranks of its army, the Armenian government resorted to press-gang raids to enlist recruits. Draft raids intensified in early spring, after Decree no. 129 was issued, instituting a three-month call-up for men up to age 45. Military police would seal off public areas, such as squares, and round up anyone who looked the right age.

By the end of 1993, the conflict over Nagorno-Karabakh had caused thousands of casualties and created hundreds of thousands of refugees on both sides. In a national address in November 1993, Əliyev stated that 16,000 Azerbaijani troops had died and 22,000 had been injured in nearly six years of fighting. The UN estimated that just under one million Azerbaijani refugees and internally displaced person were in Azerbaijan at the end of 1993. Mediation was attempted by officials from Russia, Kazakhstan, and Iran, among other countries, and by organizations, including the UN and the Conference on Security and Cooperation in Europe, which began sponsoring peace talks in mid-1992. All negotiations met with little success, and several cease-fires broke down. In mid-1993, Əliyev launched efforts to negotiate a solution directly with the Karabakh Armenians, a step which Abulfaz Elchibey had refused to take. Əliyev's efforts achieved several relatively long cease-fires in Nagorno-Karabakh, but outside the region Armenians occupied large sections of southwestern Azerbaijan near the Iranian border during offensives in August and October 1993. Iran and Turkey warned the Nagorno-Karabakh Armenians to cease the offensive operations that threatened to spill over into foreign territory. The Armenians responded by claiming that they were driving back Azerbaijani forces to protect Nagorno-Karabakh from shelling.

In 1993, the UN Security Council called for Armenian forces to cease their attacks on and occupation of a number of Azerbaijani regions. In September 1993, Turkey strengthened its forces along its border with Armenia and issued a warning to Armenia to withdraw its troops from Azerbaijan immediately and unconditionally. At the same time, Iran was conducting military maneuvers near the Nakhichevan Autonomous Republic in a move widely regarded as a warning to Armenia. Iran proposed creation of a twenty-kilometer security zone along the Iranian-Azerbaijani border, where Azerbaijanis would be protected by Iranian firepower. Iran also contributed to the upkeep of camps in southwestern Azerbaijan to house and feed up to 200,000 Azerbaijanis fleeing the fighting.

Fighting continued into early 1994, with Azerbaijani forces reportedly winning some engagements and regaining some territory lost in previous months. In January 1994, Əliyev pledged that in the coming year occupied territory would be liberated and Azerbaijani refugees would return to their homes. At that point, Armenian forces held an estimated 14 percent of the area recognized as Azerbaijan, with Nagorno-Karabakh proper comprising 5 percent.

However, during the first three months of 1994 the Nagorno-Karabakh Defense Army started a new offensive campaign and captured some areas, creating a wider safety and buffer zone around Nagorno-Karabakh. By May 1994 the Armenians were in control of 20% of the territory of Azerbaijan. At that stage the Government of Azerbaijan for the first time during the conflict recognised Nagorno-Karabakh as a third party of the war and started direct negotiations with the Karabakhi authorities. As a result a cease-fire was reached on May 12, 1994, through Russian negotiations, which ended entirely with the outbreak of the Second Nagorno-Karabakh War.

As a result of the First Nagorno-Karabakh War, Azerbaijanis were driven out of Nagorno-Karabakh and territories adjacent to Nagorno-Karabakh. With the support of Soviet/Russian military forces, Azerbaijanis forced tens of thousands of Armenians out of Shahumyan region. Armenians remained in control of the Soviet-era autonomous region, and a strip of land called the Lachin corridor linking it with the Republic of Armenia, as well as seven surrounding districts of Azerbaijan. The Shahumyan region remained under the control of Azerbaijan.

== 2010s ==
On May 23, 2010, people in the territory went to polling stations to elect the state's parliament; more than 70 international observers were reported as attending.

== 2023 ==
Three Armenian police officers and two Azerbaijani soldiers were killed on 5 March during border clashes near the Lachin Corridor. Both nations accused each other of opening fire first. On 25 March, the Ministry of Defence in Russia accused Azerbaijan of violating the 2020 ceasefire agreement after a unit of the Azerbaijani Armed Forces crossed the Line of Contact in Shushi Province, Artsakh, and seized control of dirt roads near the Lachin corridor.

On 11 July, Azerbaijan's State Border Service temporarily shut down the Lachin corridor, the only road between Armenia and the disputed Nagorno-Karabakh region, alleging smuggling by the Armenian Red Cross Society. The corridor was reopened on 17 July to allow the Red Cross to conduct medical evacuations from Nagorno-Karabakh to Armenia amid protests over the corridor's closure on July 11 and humanitarian concerns.

On 9 September, Samvel Shahramanyan, the sole candidate, was elected in the territory's presidential elections in a 22–1 vote out of 23 deputies present.

On 19 September, Azerbaijan launched an offensive on Nagorno-Karabakh after blaming Armenian sabotage groups for an incident in which four Azerbaijani police officers and two civilians were killed by separate mine explosions in the region. As a result of the offensive, Azerbaijan demanded the withdrawal of ethnic Armenian forces from the region, with the Presidential Administration of Azerbaijan announcing that Armenia must hand over all weapons present in the territory in order to stop "anti-terrorism" activities.

Azerbaijan claimed its forces broke through the contact line and captured over 60 military posts in Nagorno-Karabakh. Artsakh forces, however, deny this. According to Republic of Artsakh government officials, 25 people, including a child, were killed due to the fighting, and 138 others were injured. Azerbaijan claims that one civilian was killed by shelling in Shusha. It was also reported that Azerbaijani forces struck Stepanakert, the de facto capital of Nagorno-Karabakh, with artillery, damaging several residential buildings.

On the next day, 20 September, Armenian separatist forces in Nagorno-Karabakh surrendered and agreed to a Russian proposal for a ceasefire with Azerbaijan effective from 1 pm that day. In response, Azerbaijan called for the "total surrender" of ethnic Armenian forces in Nagorno-Karabakh, and ordered the Republic of Artsakh government to dissolve itself, saying its military offensive will continue until the region is under its full control.

Peace talks between Azerbaijan and the separatists were set for the following day in Yevlakh. Russia's peacekeeping contingent was reported to have an assisting role in coordinating the ceasefire. As a result of the surrender, thousands of Artsakh residents gathered at Stepanakert Airport, where some Russian peacekeepers were stationed, seeking evacuation.

On 21 September, delegates of Azerbaijan and Artsakh met in the Azeri city of Yevlakh. No formal agreement was adopted after two hours of talks.

The government of Artsakh announced on 24 September that most of its population will leave following Azerbaijan's takeover of the territory with Armenia confirming that 1,050 refugees from Artsakh have arrived in the country. The number of refugees fleeing to Armenia from Artsakh increased to 6,500 by the next day.

By 27 September, the number of refugees fleeing Artsakh to Armenia increased to 50,243, comprising more than a third of the region's population. Azerbaijan also reported that day that 192 of its troops were killed and more than 500 others were injured during last week's offensive on Nagorno-Karabakh. Former State Minister of Artsakh Ruben Vardanyan was arrested by Azerbaijan after attempting to cross the border into Armenia.

On 29 September, Samvel Shahramanyan, president of the breakaway Republic of Artsakh, signed a decree to dissolve all state institutions of Artsakh beginning at the start of 2024.

On 3 October, the number of refugees fleeing Artsakh to Armenia reached 100,617, which was the majority of the region's population. Davit Ishkhanyan and three former presidents of Artsakh, Arkadi Ghukasyan, Bako Sahakyan and Arayik Harutyunyan, were detained by the State Security Service of Azerbaijan and brought to Baku.

== Timeline ==
Timeline of Artsakh history
Starting Date	Sovereign	State/Region	Artsakh Proper
592 BC	Iran (Medes)		Unknown (Urtekhini?)
549 BC	Iran (Achaemenid dynasty)		Unknown (Urtekhini?)
321 BC			Unknown (Urtekhini?)
189 BC			
Armenia (Artaxiad dynasty)	Province of Artsakh of the Kingdom of Armenia 189 BC to 387 AD (Note: The exact date of the establishment of the Province of Artsakh is not known, but is believed to be sometime before 189 BC.)		
Sophene and Kingdom of Commagene – Tigranes the Great conquered these territories	Province of Artsakh of the Kingdom of Armenia 189 BC to 387 AD		
65 BC	Province of Artsakh of the Kingdom of Armenia 189 BC to 387 AD	Rome	(Artaxiad dynasty) Tigranes II of Armenia becomes a client king of Rome
53 BC	Province of Artsakh of the Kingdom of Armenia 189 BC to 387 AD	Persia (Arsacid dynasty) defeats Rome at the Battle of Carrhae	Armenia (Artaxiad dynasty) – Artavasdes II becomes king of Armenia.
36 BC	Province of Artsakh of the Kingdom of Armenia 189 BC to 387 AD	Rome	Mark Antony begins Parthian campaign Rebellion of King Zober of Albania defeated.
33 BC	Province of Artsakh of the Kingdom of Armenia 189 BC to 387 AD	Rome	Armenia (Artaxiad dynasty)
36	Province of Artsakh of the Kingdom of Armenia 189 BC to 387 AD	Iran (Arsacid dynasty)	
47	Province of Artsakh of the Kingdom of Armenia 189 BC to 387 AD		
51	Province of Artsakh of the Kingdom of Armenia 189 BC to 387 AD	Iberia (Pharnavazid dynasty)	
58	Province of Artsakh of the Kingdom of Armenia 189 BC to 387 AD	Armenia (Arsacid dynasty)	
62	Province of Artsakh of the Kingdom of Armenia 189 BC to 387 AD	Armenia (Arsacid dynasty)	Iran (Arsacid dynasty) Parthians under Vologases I invade Armenia, unsuccessfully besiege Romans in Tigranocerta.
63	Province of Artsakh of the Kingdom of Armenia 189 BC to 387 AD	Armenia (Arsacid dynasty)	Rome: Gnaeus Domitius Corbulo invades Armenia and defeats Tiridates I, who accepts Roman sovereignty. Parthia withdraws.
64	Province of Artsakh of the Kingdom of Armenia 189 BC to 387 AD	Armenia (Arsacid dynasty)	Iran (Arsacid dynasty)
114	Province of Artsakh of the Kingdom of Armenia 189 BC to 387 AD	Rome	Roman Armenia Emperor Trajan defeats the Parthians and overruns Armenia
118	Province of Artsakh of the Kingdom of Armenia 189 BC to 387 AD	Armenia (Arsacid dynasty)	
252	Province of Artsakh of the Kingdom of Armenia 189 BC to 387 AD	Iran (Sassanian dynasty)	Armenia (Arsacid dynasty)
287	Province of Artsakh of the Kingdom of Armenia 189 BC to 387 AD	Rome: Diocletian signs peace treaty with King Bahram II of Persia, installs the pro-Roman Arsacid Tiridates III as king in western Armenia.	Armenia (Arsacid dynasty)
363	Province of Artsakh of the Kingdom of Armenia 189 BC to 387 AD	Persia(Sassanian dynasty: Jovian cedes Corduene and Arzanene to Sassanids.	Corduene and Arzanene
363	Province of Artsakh of the Kingdom of Armenia 189 BC to 387 AD	Albania (Mihranid dynasty)	
376	Armenia (Arsacid dynasty)		
387	Iran (Sassanian dynasty)		
387	Albania (Mihranid dynasty)	with Sasanian help seizes from Armenia the entire right bank of the river Kura up to the river Araxes	includes Artsakh and Utik.
387	Division of Greater Armenia between Persia and Byzantium		
654	Arab Caliphate	Albania (Mihranid dynasty), al-Arminiya	
850	Artsakh		
884	Armenia (Bagratid dynasty)		Artsakh
1045	Artsakh		
1063	Seljuk Empire		Artsakh
1092	Eldiguzids		Artsakh
1124	Georgia (Bagratid dynasty)	Eldiguzids	Artsakh
1201	Georgia (Bagratid dynasty)	Armenia (Zakarid dynasty)	Artsakh
1214	Georgia (Bagratid dynasty)	Armenia (Zakarid dynasty)	Artsakh (Hasan-Jalalyan dynasty)
1236	Mongol Empire	Armenia (Zakarid dynasty)	Artsakh (Hasan-Jalalyan dynasty)
1256	Ilkhanate	Armenia (Zakarid dynasty)	Artsakh (Hasan-Jalalyan dynasty)
1261	Ilkhanate	Armenia (Zakarid dynasty)	Khachen (Hasan-Jalalyan dynasty)
1360	Ilkhanate	Karabakh	Khachen (Hasan-Jalalyan dynasty)
1337	Chobanids	Karabakh	Khachen (Hasan-Jalalyan dynasty)
1357	Jalayirids	Karabakh	Khachen (Hasan-Jalalyan dynasty)
1375	Kara Koyunlu	Karabakh	Khachen (Hasan-Jalalyan dynasty)
1387	Timurid Empire	Karabakh	Khachen (Hasan-Jalalyan dynasty)
1409	Kara Koyunlu	Karabakh	Khachen (Hasan-Jalalyan dynasty)
1468	Ak Koyunlu	Karabakh	Khachen (Hasan-Jalalyan dynasty)
1501	Iran (Safavid dynasty)	Province of Karabakh	Melikdoms of Karabakh (Khamsa) (Note: The Hasan-Jalalyan dynasty branches out sometime in the 16th century.)
1583	Ottoman Empire	Province of Karabakh	Melikdoms of Karabakh (Khamsa)
1603	Iran (Safavid dynasty)	Province of Karabakh	Melikdoms of Karabakh (Khamsa)
1725		Province of Karabakh	Melikdoms of Karabakh (Khamsa)
1736	Iran (Afsharid dynasty)	Province of Karabakh	Melikdoms of Karabakh (Khamsa)
1747		Karabakh Khanate	Melikdoms of Karabakh (Khamsa)
1751	Iran (Zand dynasty)	Karabakh Khanate	Melikdoms of Karabakh (Khamsa)
1797	Iran (Qajar dynasty)	Karabakh Khanate	Melikdoms of Karabakh (Khamsa)
1805-05 (Note: The Russian Empire occupies the lands, but they're formally annexed only in 1813 by the Treaty of Gulistan.)	Russia (Romanov dynasty)	Karabakh Khanate	Melikdoms of Karabakh (Khamsa)
1822	Russia (Romanov dynasty)		
1846	Russia (Romanov dynasty)	Shemakha Governorate (Note: Shemakha Governorate was renamed to Baku Governorate in 1859.)	
1868	Russia (Romanov dynasty)	Elisabethpol Governorate	
1917-11-11	Transcaucasian Commissariat	Elisabethpol Governorate	
1918-04-22	Transcaucasia (Note: The Transcaucasian Democratic Federal Republic was a multi-national entity established by Armenian, Azerbaijani and Georgian leaders.)	Elisabethpol Governorate	
1918-05-28	First Republic of Armenia: Declaration of independence		Armenian rebels
1918-06-04 (Note: Treaty of Batum)			Armenian rebels
1918-07-27	People's Government of Karabakh		
1918-09	Ottoman Empire		Azerbaijan (Shusha); Armenian rebels (other areas)
1918-10-30 (Note: Armistice of Mudros)	British Empire		Mountainous Karabakh was placed under the jurisdiction of Azerbaijan until the final delimitation agreement would be reached at the Paris Peace Conference.
1919-08-22 (Note: Seventh Assembly of Mountainous Karabakh)	British Empire		Mountainous Karabakh was placed under the jurisdiction of Azerbaijan until the final delimitation agreement would be reached at the Paris Peace Conference.
1919-08-23 (Note: British withdrawal.)			Mountainous Karabakh was placed under the jurisdiction of Azerbaijan until the final delimitation agreement would be reached at the Paris Peace Conference.
1920-03-04 (Note: Eighth Assembly of Mountainous Karabakh)	Azerbaijan		Azerbaijan (Shusha); Armenian rebels (other areas)
1920-04-09	Azerbaijan		Azerbaijan (Shusha, Khankendi, Askeran); Armenian rebels (other areas)
1920-04-13 (Note: General Dro (Drastamat Kanayan) takes parts of Mountainous Karabakh on behalf of the Republic of Armenia.)	Azerbaijan		Azerbaijan (Shusha, Khankendi, Askeran); Armenian rebels (other areas)
1920-04-22 (Note: Ninth Assembly of Mountainous Karabakh)	Azerbaijan		Azerbaijan (Shusha, Khankendi, Askeran); Armenian rebels (other areas)
1920-04-28 (Note: Azerbaijan is invaded by the Red Army.)	Azerbaijan		Azerbaijan (Shusha, Khankendi, Askeran); Armenian rebels (other areas)
1920-05-12	Red Army 11th Red Army advances into Armenia on 29 November 1920; transfer of power on 2 December in Yerevan.	Azerbaijan SSR	Azerbaijan SSR (Shusha, Khankendi, Askeran); Armenian rebels (other areas)
1920-05-26	Red Army 11th Red Army advances into Armenia on 29 November 1920; transfer of power on 2 December in Yerevan.	Azerbaijan SSR	The final status of Mountainous Karabakh was still being debated.
1920-12-01 (Note: Azerbaijan SSR's revolutionary committee declares Mountainous Karabakh to be transferred to Armenian SSR.)	Red Army 11th Red Army advances into Armenia on 29 November 1920; transfer of power on 2 December in Yerevan.	Azerbaijan SSR	The final status of Mountainous Karabakh was still being debated.
1921-07-04 (Note: Kavbiuro decides to leave Mountainous-Karabakh within Azerbaijan SSR.)	Red Army 11th Red Army advances into Armenia on 29 November 1920; transfer of power on 2 December in Yerevan.	Azerbaijan SSR	The final status of Mountainous Karabakh was still being debated.
1922-03-12	Red Army 11th Red Army advances into Armenia on 29 November 1920; transfer of power on 2 December in Yerevan.	Azerbaijan SSR, Transcaucasian SFSR	The final status of Mountainous Karabakh was still being debated.
1922-12-30	USSR	Azerbaijan SSR, Transcaucasian SFSR	
1923-07-07 (Note: Declared, and then implemented in November of 1924.)	USSR	Azerbaijan SSR, Transcaucasian SFSR	Nagorno-Karabakh Autonomous Oblast
1936-12-05	USSR	Azerbaijan SSR	Nagorno-Karabakh Autonomous Oblast
1991	First Nagorno-Karabakh War: Artsakh and Armenia; Azerbaijan		
1991-04-30 (Note: Operation Ring)	First Nagorno-Karabakh War: Artsakh and Armenia; Azerbaijan		
1991-09-02 (Note: The Armenians of the Nagorno-Karabakh Autonomous Oblast declare their independence.)	First Nagorno-Karabakh War: Artsakh and Armenia; Azerbaijan		
1991-11-26 (Note: Azerbaijan abolishes the Nagorno-Karabakh Autonomous Oblast.)	First Nagorno-Karabakh War: Artsakh and Armenia; Azerbaijan		
1994-05-12 (Note: Bishkek Protocol ceasefire.)	De facto Artsakh, de jure Azerbaijan		
2020-09-27	Second Nagorno-Karabakh War: Artsakh Armenia; Azerbaijan Turkey		
2020-11-10 (Note: 2020 Nagorno-Karabakh ceasefire agreement.)	Control over Nagorno-Karabakh is divided between Azerbaijan and Artsakh with Russian peacekeeping forces.		

== See also ==
- Demographics of the Republic of Artsakh
- List of massacres in Azerbaijan
- Republic of Artsakh
- Timeline of Artsakh history
