= Roman influence in Caucasian Albania =

Influence of the culture of the Roman Empire in the Caucasus

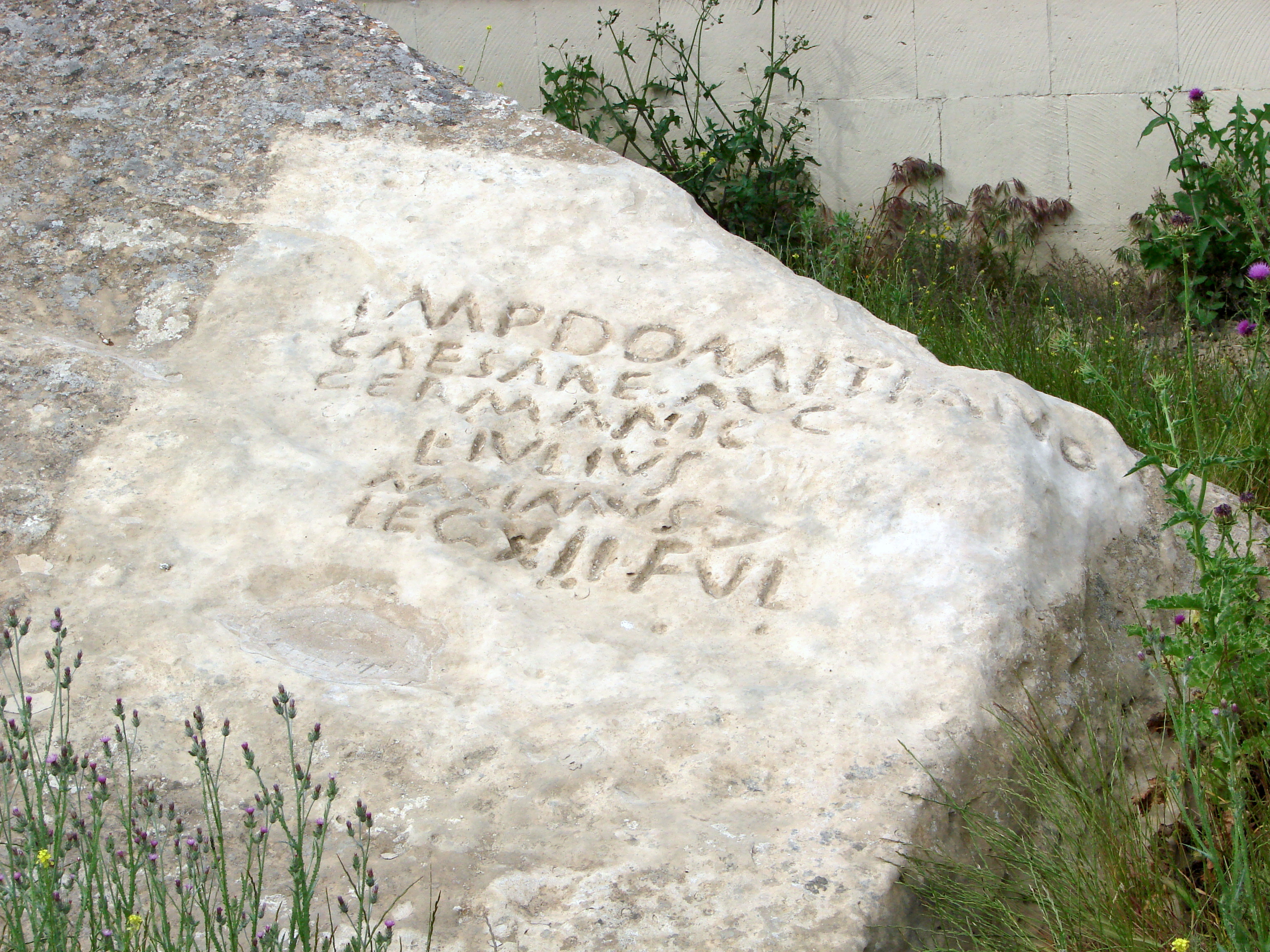
Roman inscription in Gobustan National Park, near Qobustan, Baku, left by Legio XII Fulminata

The Roman Empire influenced parts of Caucasian Albania (located largely in the North and Northwestern parts of the present day Azerbaijan).

== Characteristics ==
The Roman Empire controlled Caucasian Albania only as a vassal state, never fully incorporating it as it temporarily did with neighboring Armenia. This influence started in the first century BC and lasted until around 250 AD, but around 299 Albania was again briefly a Roman vassal state under Emperor Diocletian.

A later influence came from the Eastern Roman Empire, when Emperor Heraclius was able to take control of Caucasian Albania in 627 with help from the Gokturks during the Third Perso-Turkic War.

== Client state ==
There was an enduring relation of Caucasian Albania with Ancient Rome.

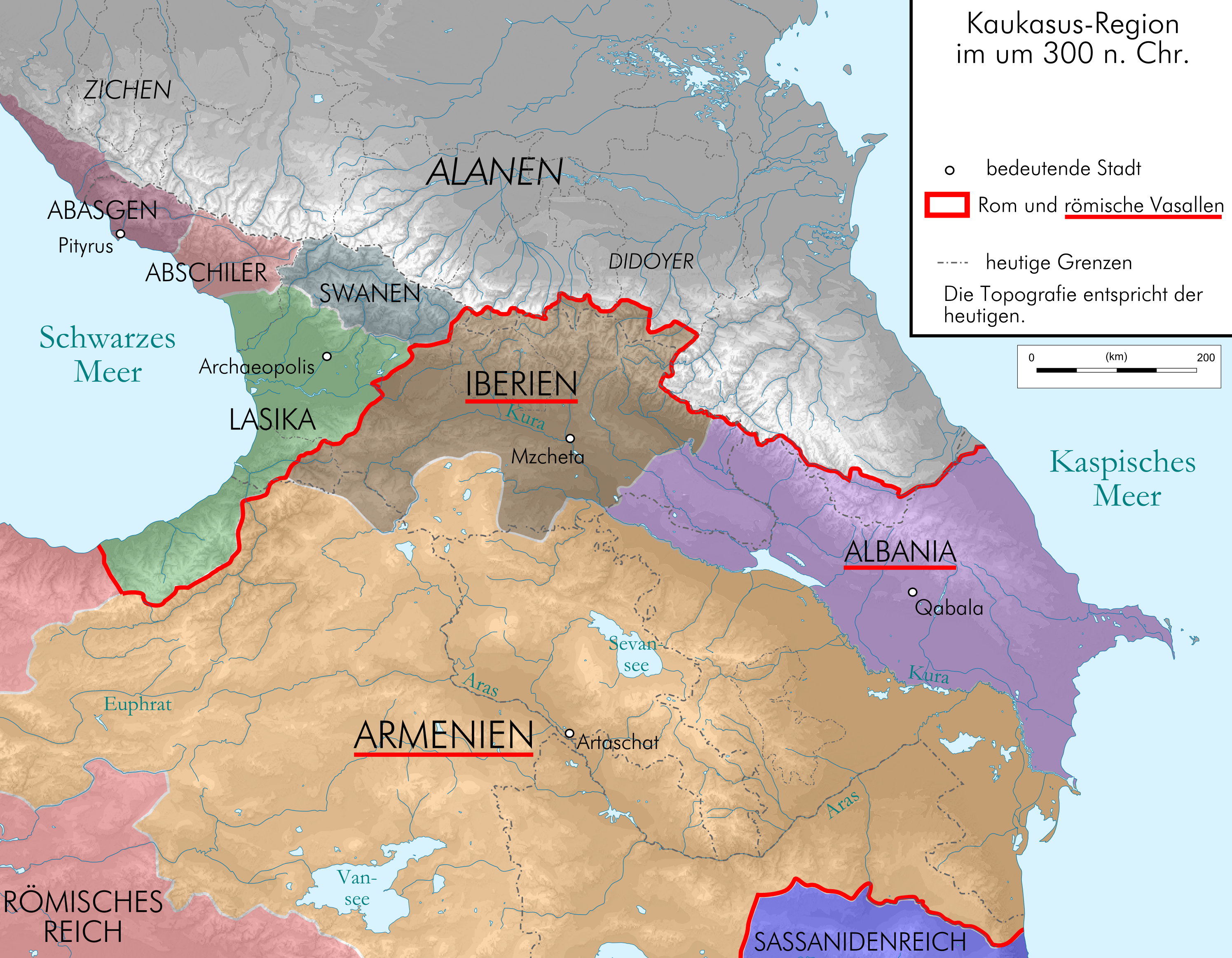
Caucasian Albania (modern day Azerbaijan) was a vassal of the Roman Empire around 300 AD (inside the red line the "Vassal States" of Rome: Albania, Iberia and Armenia)

In 65 BC the Roman general Pompey, who had just subjugated Armenia and Iberia and had conquered Colchis, entered Caucasian Albania at the head of his army. He clashed with the forces of Oroezes, king of Albania, and quickly defeated them. Pompey ensured the control of Albanians nearly reaching the Caspian Sea before returning to Anatolia. But the Albanians, influenced by the Parthian Empire were not slow to revolt against Rome: in 36 BC Mark Antony found himself obliged to send one of his lieutenants to bring an end to their rebellion. Zober, who was then king of Albania, capitulated and Albania thus became – at least in name – a "Roman protectorate", starting a condition of vassalage that lasted for nearly three centuries.

A king of Albania appears in the list of dynasties whose ambassadors were received by Augustus.

In 35 AD King Pharasmanes of Iberia and his brother Mithridates, with the support of Rome, confronted the Parthians in Armenia: the Albanians proved effective allies, contributing to the defeat and temporary eviction of the Parthians.

Emperor Nero prepared in 67 AD a military expedition in the Caucasus: he wanted to defeat the barbarian Alans and conquer for Rome all the northern shores of the Black Sea from actual Georgia-Azerbaijan to what is now Romania-Moldavia, but his death stopped it.

Successively, Vespasian was determined to restore and reinforce the full authority of Rome in the Caucasus as far as the Caspian Sea. He probably founded a Roman town called Laso, recently rediscovered inside the actual city of Ganja.

Despite the growth of Roman influence, Albania never ceased to remain in commercial, ethnical, and cultural contact with Persia, but with Trajan in 114 AD Roman control over Caucasian Albania was nearly complete, with top social levels fully Romanized.

The Princes also of the Caucasian tribes, the Albani, the Iberi....even those of the trans-Caucasian Sarmatae were confirmed in the relation of (Roman) vassallage or now subjected to it (by Trajan).

During the reign of Roman Emperor Hadrian (117–138), Albania was invaded by the Alans, an Iranian nomadic group. This invasion promoted an alliance between Rome and the Albanians that was reinforced under Antoninus Pius in 140 AD. Sassanians occupied the area around 240 AD but after a few years the Roman Empire regained control of Caucasian Albania.

Indeed, in 297 the Treaty of Nisibis stipulated the re-establishment of the Roman protectorate over Caucasian Iberia and Caucasian Albania, but fifty years later Rome lost the area that since then remained an integral part of the Sassanian Empire for more than two centuries.

In the late sixth century, the territory of Albania became again an arena of wars between Sassanian Persia and the Byzantine/Eastern Roman Empire. During the third Perso-Turkic War, the Khazars (Gokturks) invaded Albania, and their leader Ziebel declared himself Lord of Albania in 627 under the Roman Heraclius rule, levying a tax on merchants and the fishermen of the Kura and Araxes rivers, which was "in accordance with the land survey of the kingdom of Persia". The Albanian kings retained their rule by paying tribute to the regional powers.

Caucasian Albania was later conquered by the Arabs in 643, during the Muslim conquest of Persia.

== Stone inscription from Legio XII Fulminata ==
The presence of a detachment of the Legio XII Fulminata at a distance of some kilometres from the shores of the Caspian Sea, in Gobustan National Park, near Qobustan (69 km south of Baku) is attested by an inscription drawn up between 83 and 96 AD in the reign of Domitian. This is one of the most eastern places reached by Roman legions.

In 75 AD, XII Fulminata was in Caucasus, where Emperor Vespasian had sent the legion to support the allied kingdoms of Iberia and Albania.

Indeed, in Azerbaijan, an inscription has been found which reads: IMP DOMITIANO CAESARE AVG GERMANICO LVCIVS IVLIVS MAXIMVS LEGIONIS XII FVL, (Under imperator Domitian, Caesar, Augustus Germanicus, Lucius Julius Maximus, Legio XII Fulminata).

Some historians argue that the actual settlement of Ramana near Baku was possibly founded by the Roman troops of Lucius Julius Maximus from "Legio XII Fulminata" in the first century AD and derives its name from the Latin Romana.

Among the facts that strengthen this hypothesis are the military-topographical map of the Caucasus published in 1903 in Russia which spells the name of town as "Romana", various Roman artefacts found in the Absheron region, and also ancient inhabitants referring to the town as Romani.

Additionally, Ramana is positioned in an area perfectly suited for a Roman castrum to control nearby Baku's port, on the commercial sea route (through the Caspian Sea) between the Caucasus and the Central Asia plains.

== See also ==
- Caucasian campaign of Pompey

== Bibliography ==
- Bais, Marco. Albania caucasica: ethnos, storia, territorio attraverso le fonti greche, latine e armene. Editore Mimesis Edizioni. Roma, 2001 ISBN 88-87231-95-8
- Mommsen, Theodore. The Provinces of the Roman Empire. Barnes & Noble. Ed. New York, 1999. ISBN 0-7607-0145-8
- Kalankatuatsi, Movses. History of Albania. Translated by L. Davlianidze-Tatishvili, Tbilisi, 1985.
- Ilia Abuladze. About the discovery of the alphabet of the Caucasian Albanians. - "Bulletin of the Institute of Language, History and Material Culture (ENIMK)", Vol. 4, Ch. I, Tbilisi, 1938.
