= Caucasian Albania (Sasanian province) =

Satrapy of the Sassanid Empire

Coordinates: 40°58′53″N 47°50′45″E

Caucasian Albania Arān, Ardān
- 252–636
- Map of the Caucasus in 387–591
- Status: Province (largely autonomous vassal principality) of the Sasanian Empire
- Capital: Kabalak (488–636); Partav (488–636)
- Common languages: Caucasian Albanian, Armenian, Parthian, Middle Persian
- Religion: Christianity, Zoroastrianism
- Government: Monarchy
- Historical era: Late antiquity
  - Established: 252
  - Disestablished: 636
Preceded by	Succeeded by
Caucasian Albania	Rashidun Caliphate; Emirate of Armenia

Caucasian Albania (Middle Persian and Parthian: 𐭀𐭓𐭃𐭀𐭍, ardān, Armenian: Ałuank) was a kingdom in West Asia in the Caucasus region, which was under the suzerainty of the Sasanian Empire from 252 to 636. Caucasian Albania should not be confused with European Albania. The toponym was created from Greek sources who incorrectly translated the Armenian language.

== History ==
In 252/3 Albania, along with Iberia and Armenia, was conquered and annexed by the Sasanian king Shapur I (r. 240–270). Albania retained its monarchy, although the king had no real power and most civil, religious, and military authority lay with the Sasanian marzban ("margrave") of the territory. In 297 the Treaty of Nisibis stipulated the re-establishment of the Roman protectorate over Iberia, but Albania remained an integral part of the Sasanian Empire. In the middle of the 4th century the king of Albania, Urnayr, arrived in Armenia and was baptized by Gregory the Illuminator, but Christianity spread in Albania slowly, and the Albanian king remained loyal to the Sasanians. After the partition of Armenia between Byzantium and Iran (387), Albania with Sasanian help was able to seize from Armenia the entire right bank of the river Kura up to the river Araxes, including Artsakh and Utik.

The Sasanian king Yazdegerd II passed an edict requiring all the Christians in his empire to convert to Mazdaism, fearing that Christians might ally with Roman Empire, which had recently adopted Christianity. This led to rebellion of Albanians, along with Armenians and Iberians. However, the Albanian king Vache, a relative of Yazdegerd II, converted to the official religion of the Sassanian empire, but quickly reverted to Christianity. In the middle of the 5th century by the order of the Sasanian king Peroz I Vache built in Utik the city initially called Perozabad, and later Partaw and Barda, and made it the capital of Albania. The seat of the Albanian Catholicos was also transferred to Partaw, as well as the marzban. After the death of Vache, Albania remained without a king for thirty years. The Sasanian Balash reestablished the Albanian monarchy by making Vachagan, son of Yazdegerd and brother of the previous king Vache, the king of Albania.

By the end of the 5th century, the ancient ruling dynasty of Albania was replaced by princes of the Parthian Mihranid family, who claimed descent from the Sasanians. They assumed the title of "Arranshah" (i.e. shah of Arran, the Iranian name of Albania). The ruling dynasty was named after its founder Mihran, who was a distant relative of the Sasanians. The Mihranid dynasty survived under Muslim suzerainty until 821-2.

In the late 6th – early 7th centuries AD the territory of Albania became an arena of wars between Sassanian Iran, Byzantium and Khazar kaganate, the latter two very often acting as allies. During the Third Perso-Turkic War, the Khazars invaded Albania, and their leader Ziebel declared himself lord of Albania, levying a tax on merchants and the fishermen of the Kura and Araxes rivers, which was "in accordance with the land survey of the kingdom of Persia". The Albanian kings retained their rule by paying tribute to the regional powers. Albania was later conquered by the Arabs during the Islamic conquest of Persia.

== Politics and organization ==
The king of Albania was a vassal of the Sasanian empire, although the monarchy did not exercise much control. The king was accountable to the marzban, who held the real authority in civil, religious, and military power. The capital of the province was P'artaw (no connection to Parthia), where they minted coins in the 5th and 6th centuries. The Albanian court was probably modeled on the Armenian court with borrowings from Parthian Iran. Albania also had the Sassanian equivalent of a wuzurg framandar (prime minister) however what his role was is not known, but, as in Sasanian Armenia, it is possible that he was subordinate to the marzban.

== Cities and fortifications ==
P'artaw was established as the capital in 448. It was later named Perozabad when Peroz rebuilt the city. The city underwent another name change when Kavad I fortified the city and called it Perozkavad ("victorious Kavad"). At this time P'artaw was highly prosperous and a powerful stronghold sometime in the 5th century. Kabala, the former capital, still maintained some importance, and it later became a see of a bishop. Excavations have revealed a fortress and walls, probably from the 5th or 6th centuries. Xalxal, a city situated in Uti but close to Iberia, became the winter residence of the Albanian kings. Diwatakan, also in Uti, became the summer residence.

The Sassanian kings, such as Yazdegerd II, Kavad I, and Khosrow I also built many fortifications in the Caucasus and Caspian coastline, the most famous being the one at Darband (modern-day Dagestan, North Caucasus). Movses Kalantuaci speaks of "magnificent walls built at great expense by the kings of Persia".

== See also ==
- Caucasian Albania

== Sources ==
- Chaumont, M. L. (1985). "Albania". Encyclopaedia Iranica, Vol. I, Fasc. 8. pp. 806–810.
- Gadjiev, Murtazali (2017). "Construction Activities of Kavād I in Caucasian Albania". Iran and the Caucasus. 21 (2). Brill: 121–131. doi:10.1163/1573384X-20170202.
- Gadjiev, Murtazali (2020). "The Chronology of the Arsacid Albanians". Gorgias Press: 29–35.
- Toumanoff, C. (1986). "Arsacids vii. The Arsacid dynasty of Armenia". Encyclopaedia Iranica, Vol. II, Fasc. 5. pp. 543–546.
- Wiesehöfer, Josef (2001). Ancient Persia. Translated by Azodi, Azizeh. I.B. Tauris. ISBN 978-1-86064-675-1.
