= Kavbiuro =

Regional organ of the Bolshevik Party

The Kavbiuro or Kavburo (Russian: Кавбюро), officially the Caucasus Bureau (Russian: Кавказское бюро), was the regional decision-making organ of the Russian Communist Party (Bolsheviks) in the Caucasus from 1920 to 1922. Established on April 8, 1920 under the leadership of Sergo Ordzhonikidze, it aimed to "coordinate the work of [the] Communists in Caucasia." The organization was based at Pyatigorsk until July 1920, at Armavir until October 1920, at Rostov-on-Don until March 1921, and finally at Tiflis.

== Nagorno-Karabakh ==
The Kavbiuro is perhaps best known for its decision on the status of Nagorno-Karabakh, a predominantly Armenian area disputed between Armenia and Azerbaijan. In the context of the Russian Revolution in the Caucasus, the Karabakh Armenians sought to join the Armenian Republic. Originally Soviet Azerbaijan promised that the province would become part of Soviet Armenia. This position was endorsed by the Kavbiuro on July 4, 1921, only to be reversed the next day, officially due to "the need for national peace between Muslims and Armenians and [the existing] economic ties between upper and lower Karabakh, [and] its permanent link with Azerbaijan."

Historian Arsène Saparov attributes this decision to the intervention of Nariman Narimanov, the chairman of the Azerbaijan Revolutionary Committee, and to the defeat of the anti-Bolshevik uprising in the Armenian province of Zangezur. Additionally, Old Bolshevik Olga Shatunovskaya alleged that Joseph Stalin "provided Narimanov with crucial support in his efforts to influence the Kavburo's decision on the fate of the mountainous province." The decision was maintained despite protests from the Armenian Central Committee. Alexander Miasnikian later described the Kavbiuro meeting at the First Congress of the Armenian Communist Party:

...the last session of the Kavbiuro can be characterized as if Aharonian, Topchubashov, and Chkhenkeli were sitting there. Azerbaijan declared that if Armenia demanded [Mountainous] Karabagh, then we will not give them kerosene.
