= Filfili =

- Municipality
- Location within Azerbaijan Location within Shaki-Zagatala Economic Region
- Coordinates: 41°07′01″N 47°35′26″E
- Country: Azerbaijan
- Rayon: Oghuz

Population
  - Total: 749
- Time zone: UTC+4 (AZT)
  - Summer (DST): UTC+5 (AZT)

Filfili (also, Bash-Fil’filli, Filfilli, and Filifli) is a village and municipality in the Oghuz Rayon of Azerbaijan. It has a population of 749.

== See also ==
- Aşağı Filfili, "Lower Filfili"
