= Yemişanlı =

Yemişanlı may refer to:

- Yemişanlı, Oghuz, Azerbaijan
- Yemişanlı, Qabala, Azerbaijan
