= Xalxalqışlaq =

- Municipality
- Location within Azerbaijan Location within Shaki-Zagatala Economic Region
- Coordinates: 41°02′48″N 47°30′07″E
- Country: Azerbaijan
- Rayon: Oghuz

Population
  - Total: 249
- Time zone: UTC+4 (AZT)
  - Summer (DST): UTC+5 (AZT)

Xalxalqışlaq (also, Khalkhalkyshlak, Xalxal-Qışlaq, and Khalkhal-Kyshlak) is a village and the least populous municipality in the Oghuz Rayon of Azerbaijan. It has a population of 249.
