= Ashaghi Mahalla Synagogue =

- Azerbaijani: Aşağı məhəllə sinaqoqu
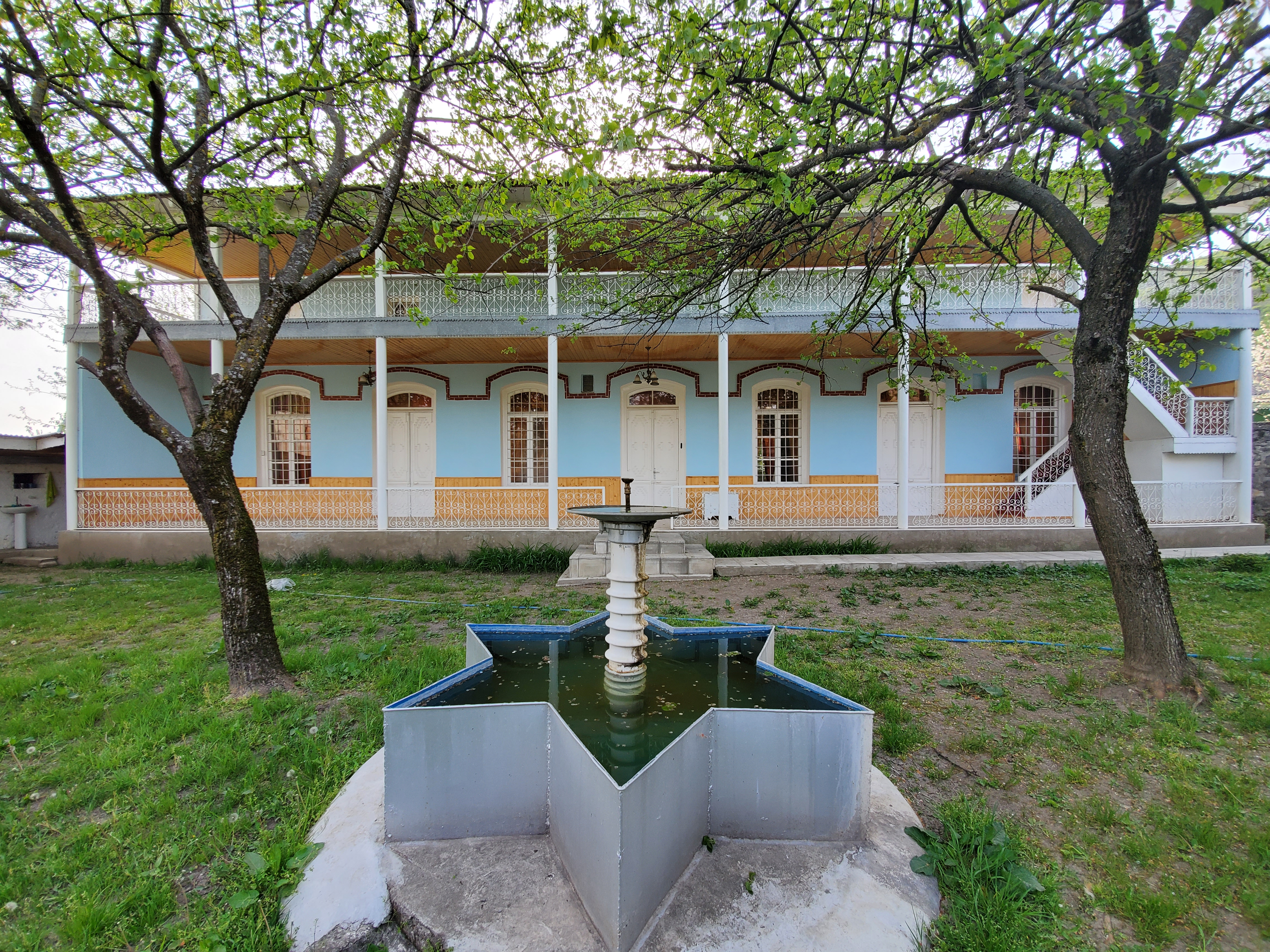

- Location in Azerbaijan Ashaghi Mahalla Synagogue (Caucasus Mountains)

Religion
- Affiliation: Judaism
- Ecclesiastical or organizational status: Synagogue
- Status: Active

Location
- Location: Gudrat Aghakishiyev Street, Oghuz 4800
- Country: Azerbaijan
- Interactive map of Ashaghi Mahalla Synagogue
- Coordinates: 41°03′56″N 47°27′26″E

Architecture
- Type: Synagogue architecture
- Completed: 1849
- Materials: Brick

Ashaghi Mahalla Synagogue (Azerbaijani: Aşağı məhəllə sinaqoqu, lit. 'Synagogue of the Lower Quarter'), is a Jewish synagogue, located in the city of Oghuz in the Republic of Azerbaijan.

== History ==
The Synagogue of the Lower Quarter, located on Gudrat Aghakishiev Street in the city of Oghuz, was built in 1849. After Soviet occupation, the synagogues edifice was used as a warehouse. After Azerbaijan regained its independence, the synagogue was restored by the local Jews (1992-1994). Although more than a century and a half have passed, the pillars used in the construction of the synagogue remain intact.

== Gallery ==
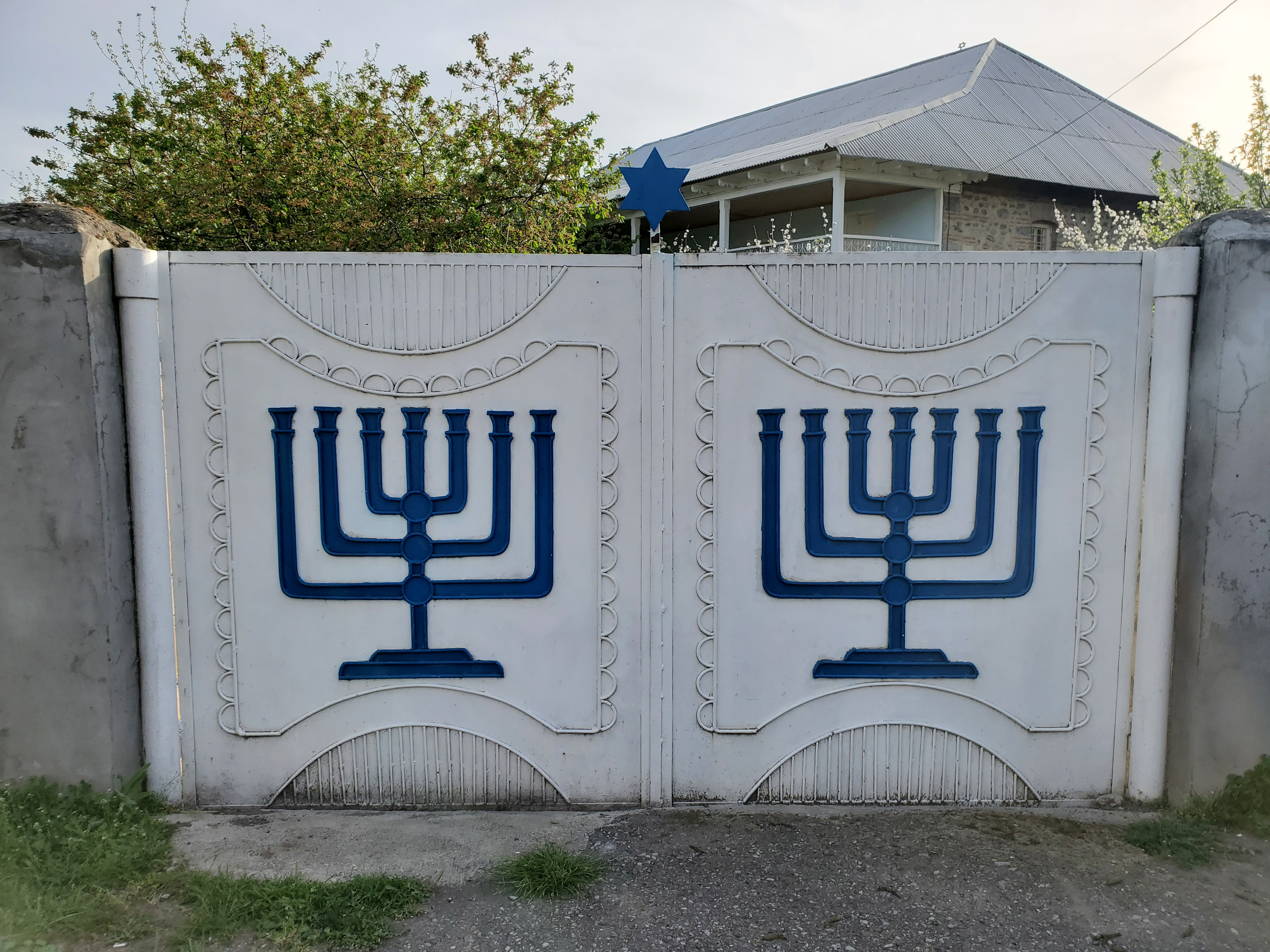

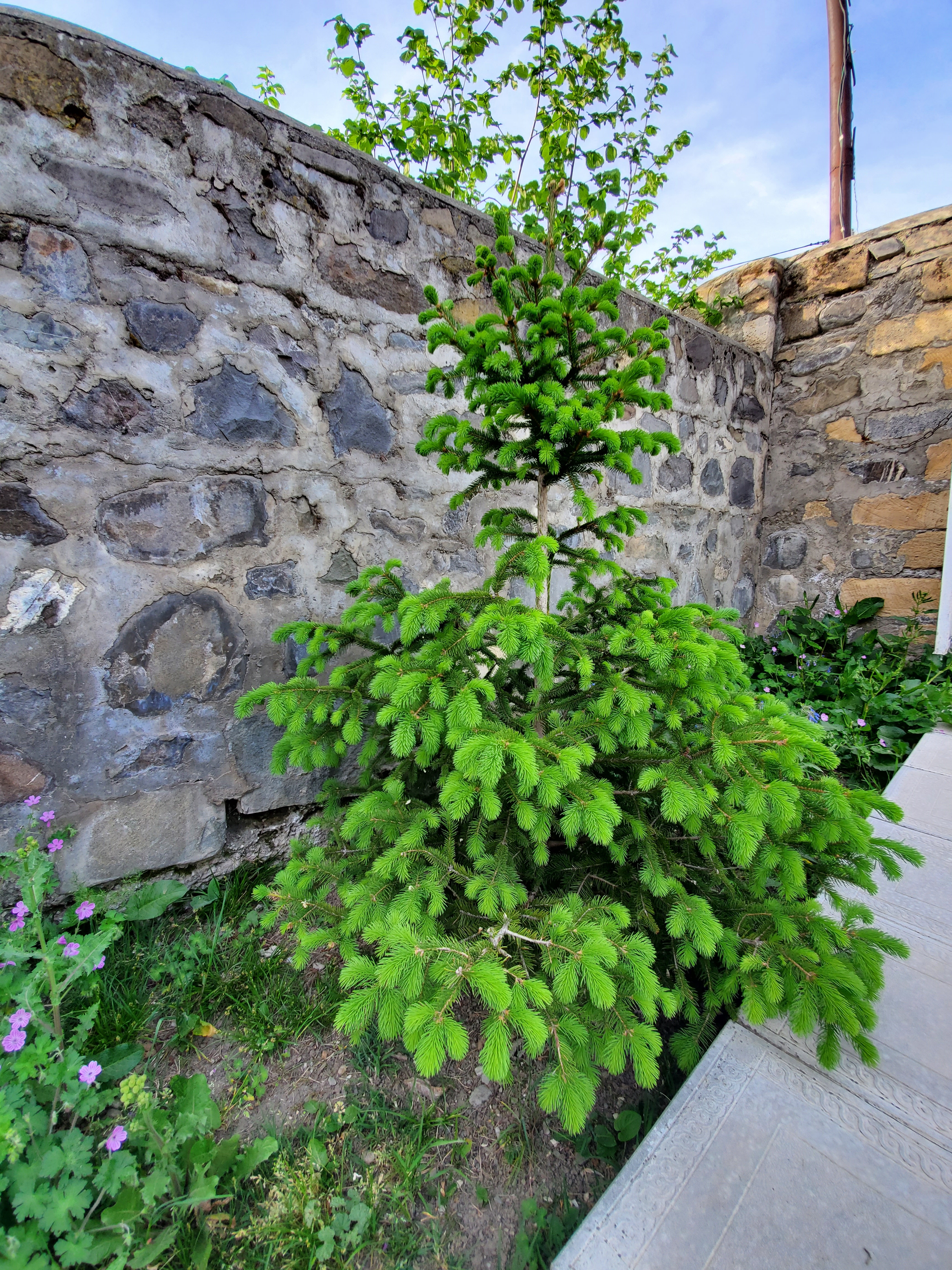

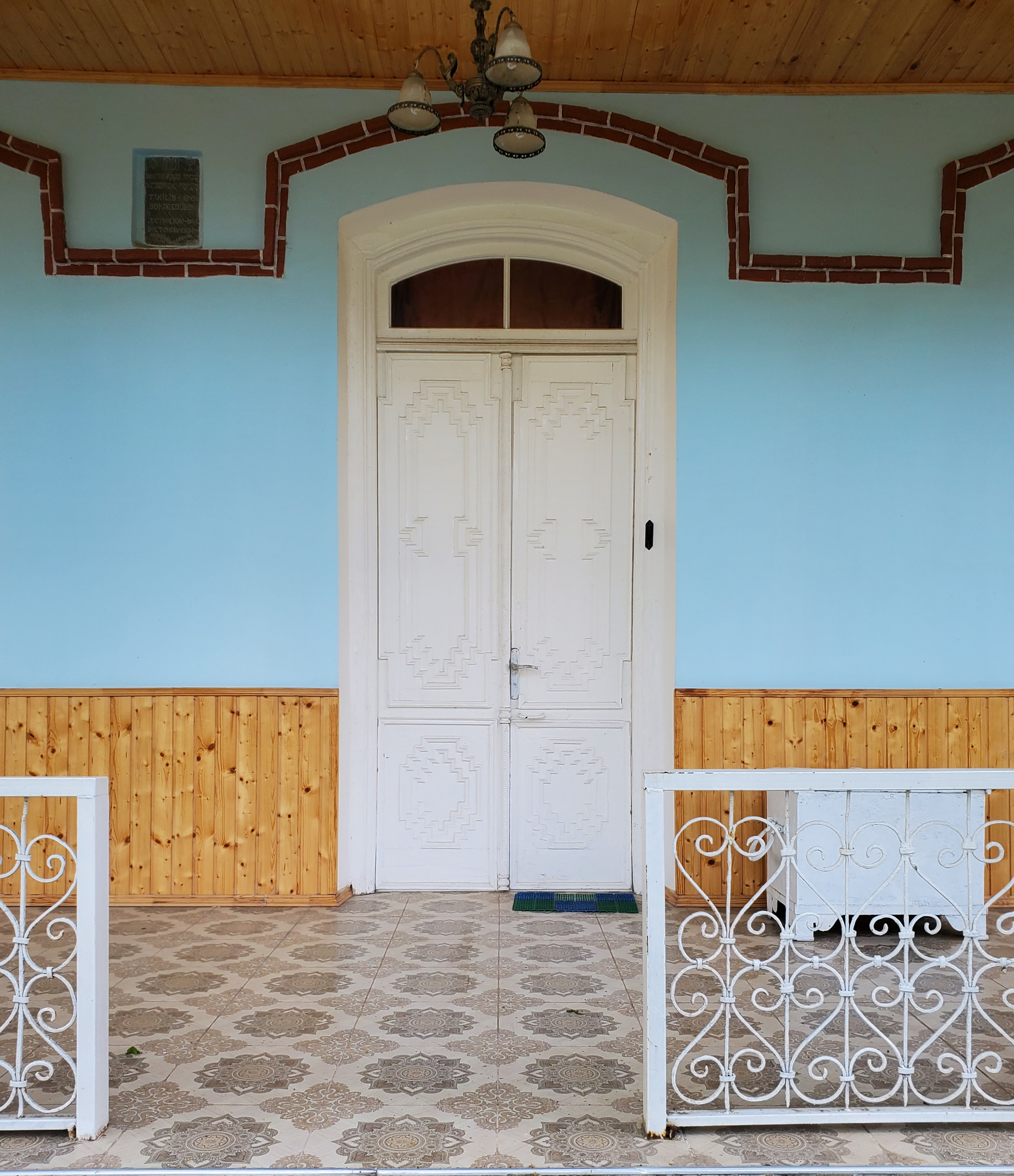

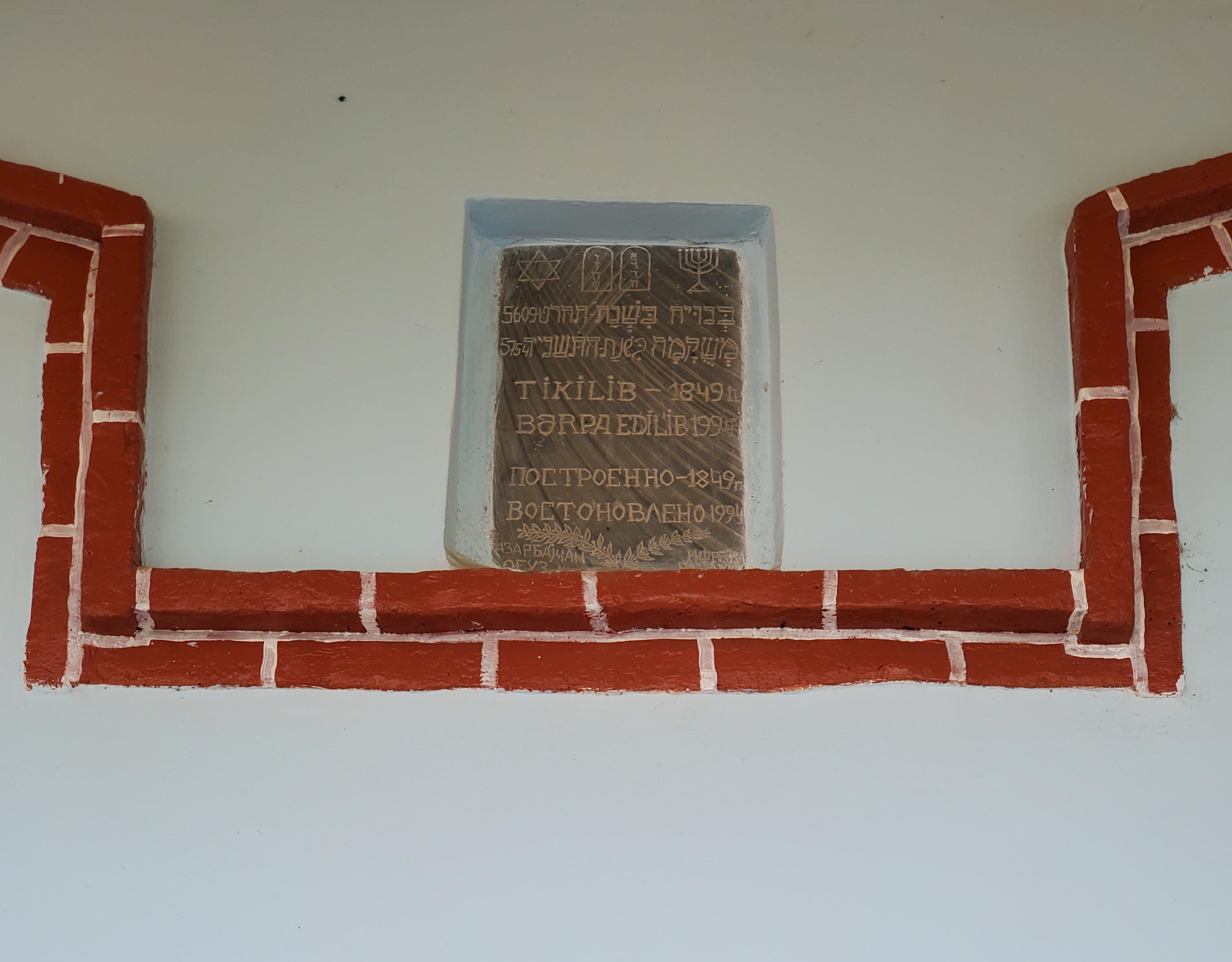

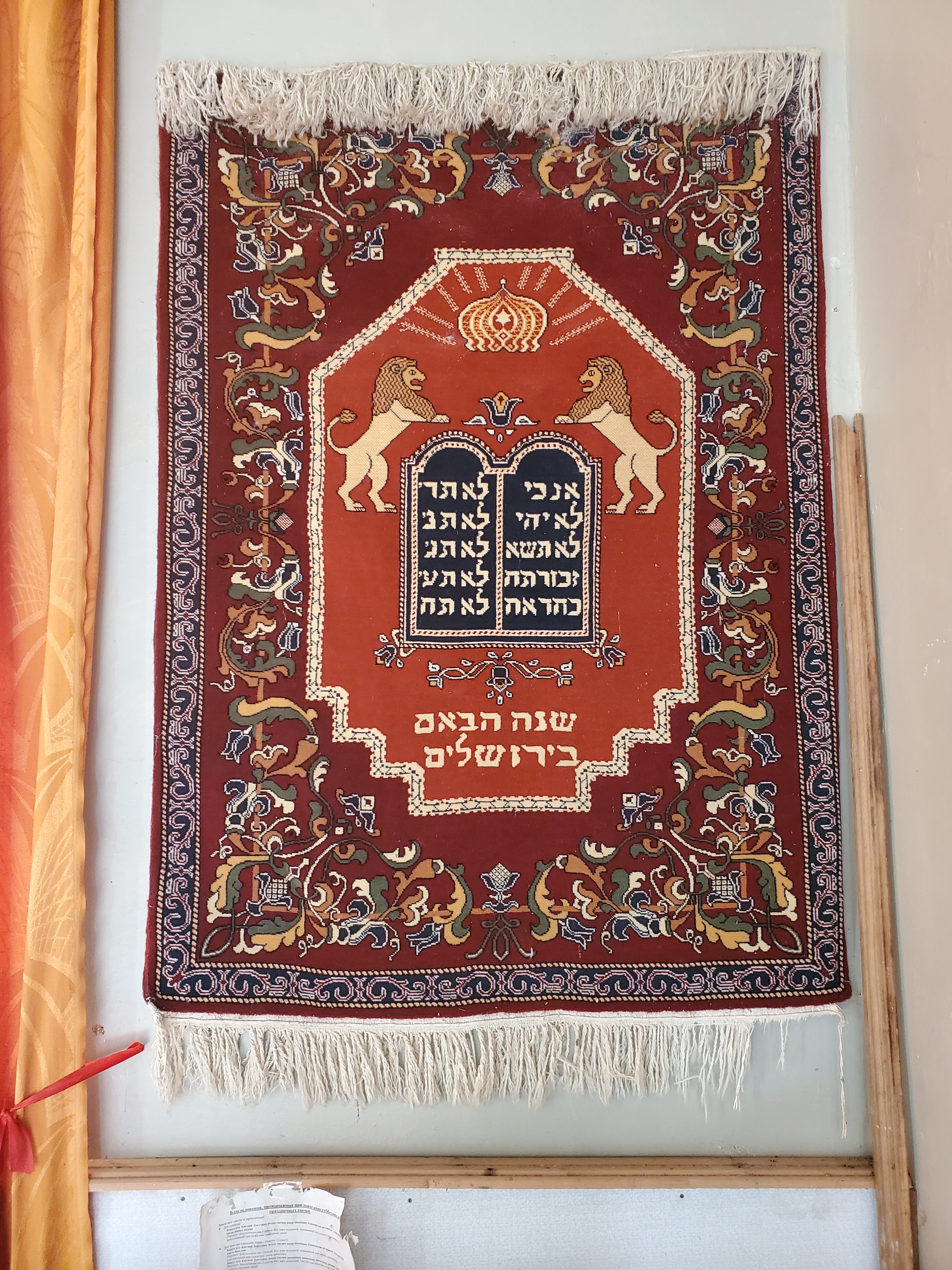

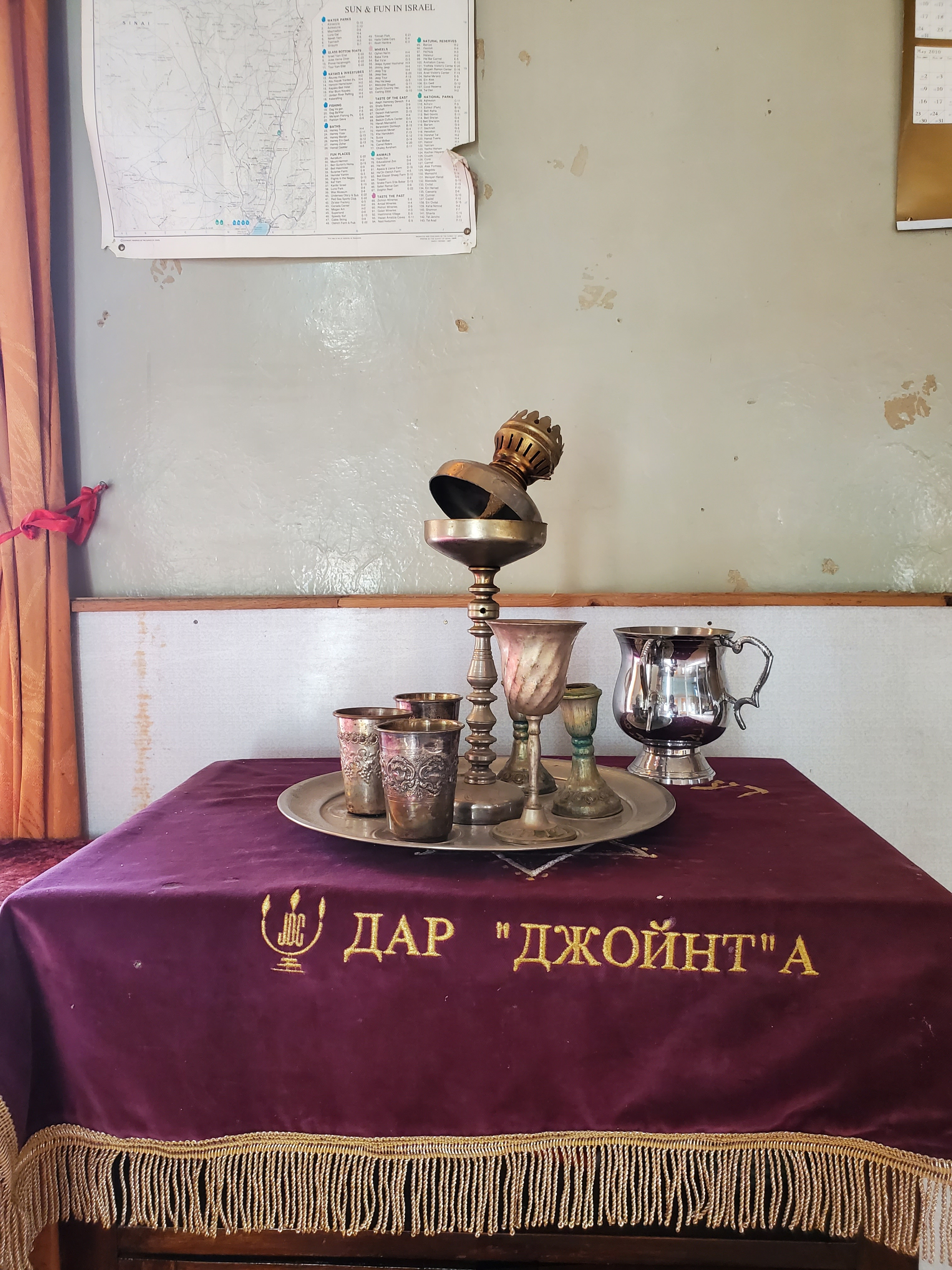

== See also ==
- History of the Jews in Azerbaijan
- Yukhari Mahalla Synagogue
