= Tayıflı =

- Municipality
- Location within Azerbaijan Location within Shaki-Zagatala Economic Region
- Coordinates: 41°00′18″N 47°30′26″E
- Country: Azerbaijan
- Rayon: Oghuz

Population
  - Total: 613
- Time zone: UTC+4 (AZT)
  - Summer (DST): UTC+5 (AZT)

Tayıflı (also, Tayifli, Taifly, Tayfliy, and Tayfly) is a village and municipality in the Oghuz Rayon of Azerbaijan. It has a population of 613, 357 of whom vote. The village has a school named Tayıflı kənd orta məktəb (Tayifli village secondary school).
