= Zərrəb =

- Municipality
- Location within Azerbaijan Location within Shaki-Zagatala Economic Region
- Coordinates: 40°56′26″N 47°25′05″E
- Country: Azerbaijan
- Rayon: Oghuz

Population
  - Total: 272
- Time zone: UTC+4 (AZT)
  - Summer (DST): UTC+5 (AZT)

Zərrəb (also, Zərrab) is a village and municipality in the Oghuz Rayon of Azerbaijan. It has a population of 272.
