= Zinobi Silikashvili =

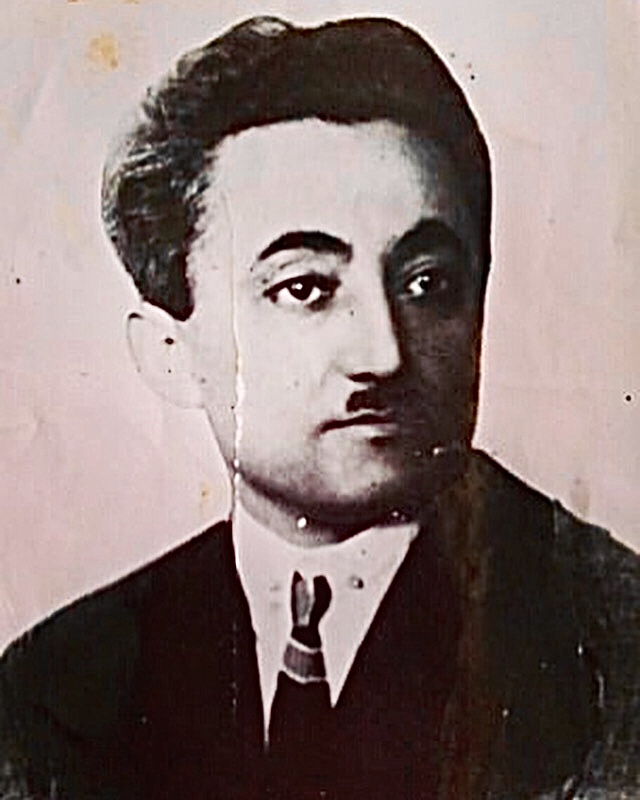
- Born: Зиновий Силиков; 1891; Vartashen, Nukha Uyezd, Elisavetpol Governorate, Russian Empire
- Died: October 16, 1938 (aged 46–47); Tbilisi, Georgian SSR
- Cause of death: Executed during Great Purge
- Education: Tbilisi Spiritual Seminary
- Known for: Founding of Zinobiani village
- Spouse: Nadezhda Antipova

Zinobi Silikashvili (1891 – 1938; Georgian: ზინობი სილიკაშვილი, Russian: Зиновий Силиков) was a Georgian public figure of Udi origin, the first leader of the Georgian Udi community and founder of Zinobiani village in Qvareli Municipality of Georgia.

== Early life ==
He was born in Vartashen (modern Oğuz, Azerbaijan) village of Nukha Uyezd, 1891 to Andria Silikov and Mariam Jeiranov. The Silikovs were wealthy and distinguished members of the local Udi community. Their family owned silk factories, lands and other types of property located in and around Vartashen. Silikashvili's ancestor Petre Silikov founded Church of St. Elisæus in 1822. Zinobi Silikashvili was educated at the Tbilisi Theological Seminary until 1911. He later went to Russia around 1917. By 1920, Zinobi Silikashvili was studying in Moscow, where he was a candidate of sciences at the Moscow Commercial Institute. In the same year, Silikashvili helped to release of 160 Georgian merchants from Russian prisons, provided them with a wagon, a pass, and returned them to Georgia.

Zinobi as student

== Establishment of Zinobiani ==
Zinobi SIlikashvili with his wife (Nadezhda Antipova) and their daughter

Breaking out of Armenian–Azerbaijani War in 1918-1920 put the small Udi community in significant danger. Many Udi men were lost in the conflict that took place during this period, since Udis were often mistaken for Armenians. Among the victims of the conflict and persecution was Zinobi Silikashvili's uncle and local cleric, Nikolai Silikov. Due to these circumstances, Silikashvili, who had returned to his native land, decided to relocate his relatives first, and at the insistence of the locals, to relocate a significant part of the Vartashen Udis to Georgia. Once passed to Georgia, the community founded the modern village of Zinobiani in 1922. By 1923, Udis had named the village Zinobiani after their leader, Zinobi. Under Silikashvili's leadership and assistance, several factories, a Red Cross medical center, a school, a post office, a cooperative and others were gradually opened in the village of Zinobiani. Also, a bath was arranged on the sulfur waters near the village.

Shortly after the migration of the Udis to Georgia, Zinobi Silikashvili led the establishment of the Georgian-Udi Society, the first organizing meeting of which was held on March 25, 1923. On this day, Zinobi Silikashvili himself addressed the community, thanking the Georgian community for their support and urging them to "contribute to this great cause and help their new comrades."

== Later life ==
In 1933-34, "Permanent Commission of Udi" was set up to work on the publication of the Udi dialect and dictionary. The commission included: Zinobi, Alexander Ajiashvili (Zinobiani Udi), brothers Mikheil and Teodore Jeiranishvili (Zinobiani Udis), Vahan Gukasyan (Nij Udi) and Davit Karbelashvili (Georgian linguist). However, in 1938, Zinobi Silikashvili became a victim of Great Purge. His shooting record stated that he was a non-partisan and that he had been arrested on being member of right-wing organization, was engaged in active subversive activities and knew about the preparation of a terrorist act against the government.

Prior to his arrest, he worked for the People's Commissariat of Communal Economy of Georgia. A hearing was held on October 11, 1938, where Silikashvili was sentenced to be shot and his personal property confiscated. On October 16 of the same year, Zinobi Silikashvili was shot. The family was deprived of personal property: including a house in Vake. He was survived by his wife Nadezhda Antipova and two children: Andro (Andria) and Leila. After the shooting of Silikashvili, the village was renamed from Zinobiani to Oktomberi. He was rehabilitated by the decision of the Transcaucasian Military Tribunal on February 21, 1956. Village's name was reverted to original in 2010 as well.
