= Muxas =

- Municipality
- Location within Azerbaijan Location within Shaki-Zagatala Economic Region
- Coordinates: 41°06′13″N 47°23′09″E
- Country: Azerbaijan
- Rayon: Oghuz

Population
  - Total: 1,058
- Time zone: UTC+4 (AZT)
  - Summer (DST): UTC+5 (AZT)

Muxas (also, Mukhas) is a village and municipality in the Oghuz Rayon of Azerbaijan. It has a population of 1,058.
