= Church of Saint Elisæus (Oghuz) =

Former church in Oghuz, Azerbaijan

Coordinates: 41°04′27.02″N 47°28′00.9″E

- Ĭvĕl Yeliseyi s'iyen Gergeś
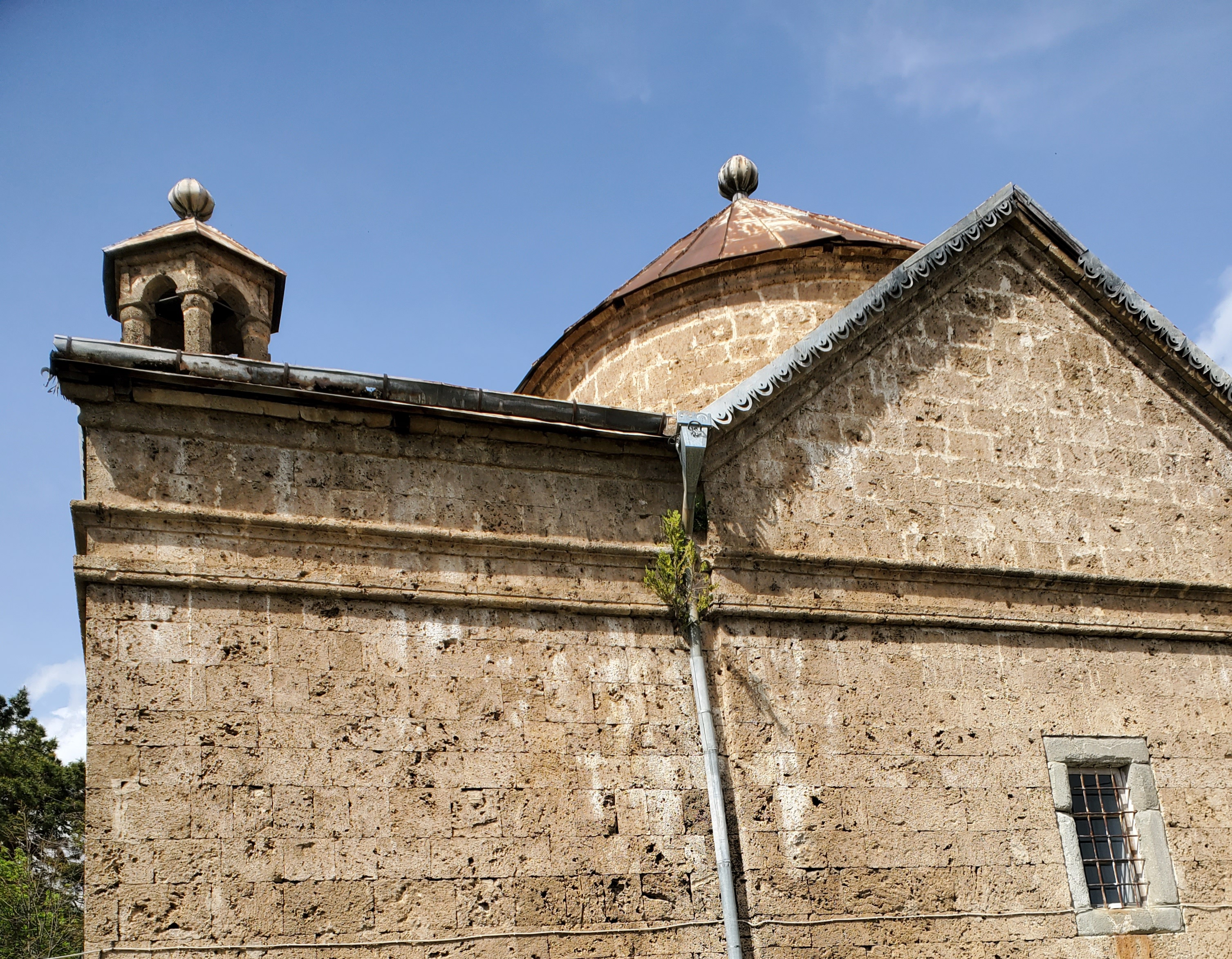

- Location within Azerbaijan

Religion
- Affiliation: Eastern Orthodox
- Status: Used as regional museum

Location
- Municipality: Oğuz
- Country: Azerbaijan
- Interactive map of Church of Saint Elisæus

Architecture
- Founder: Iosif Bezhanov or Pyotr Silikov
- Completed: 1822
- Interior area: 112 m^{2}

Church of Saint Elisæus (Armenian: Սուրբ Եղիշե եկեղեցի, Russian: Церковь Святого Елисея, Udi: Ĭvĕl Yeliseyi s'iyen Gergeś) was a former Eastern Orthodox church and Armenian Apostolic Church named after Elisaeus of Albania. It is now a museum located in Oğuz, Azerbaijan (formerly Vartashen).

== History ==
Two different theories exist about foundation of the church. According to one version, it was found by bishop Pyotr (or Petre) Silikov in 1822, however according to Mikhail Bezhanov, a local Udi ethnograph it was his ancestor Iosif Bezhanov who built this church. Both sources agree on the date and its foundation as Eastern Orthodox church, however. According to Georgian researcher Roland Topchishvili, later the church fell under jurisdiction of Armenian Church and some members of Silikov family Armenianized, possibly causing the dispute. Best example for this branching can observed in person of Movses Silikyan, an ethnic Udi of Armenian confession and Zinobi Silikashvili, an Udi of Orthodox confession. Church ceased to function after Soviet takeover.

== As museum ==
Oghuz Regional History and Ethnography Museum (Azerbaijani: Oğuz Tarix-Diyarşünaslıq Muzeyi) was established on February 19, 1981, in the church building, currently housing 4441 exhibits. In the first years of its activity, there were only 200 exhibits in the main fund. There are many valuable examples of the history, culture, ethnography and craftsmanship of the local area. 168 samples of material culture obtained during archeological excavations in the region are also demonstrated here.

== Gallery ==
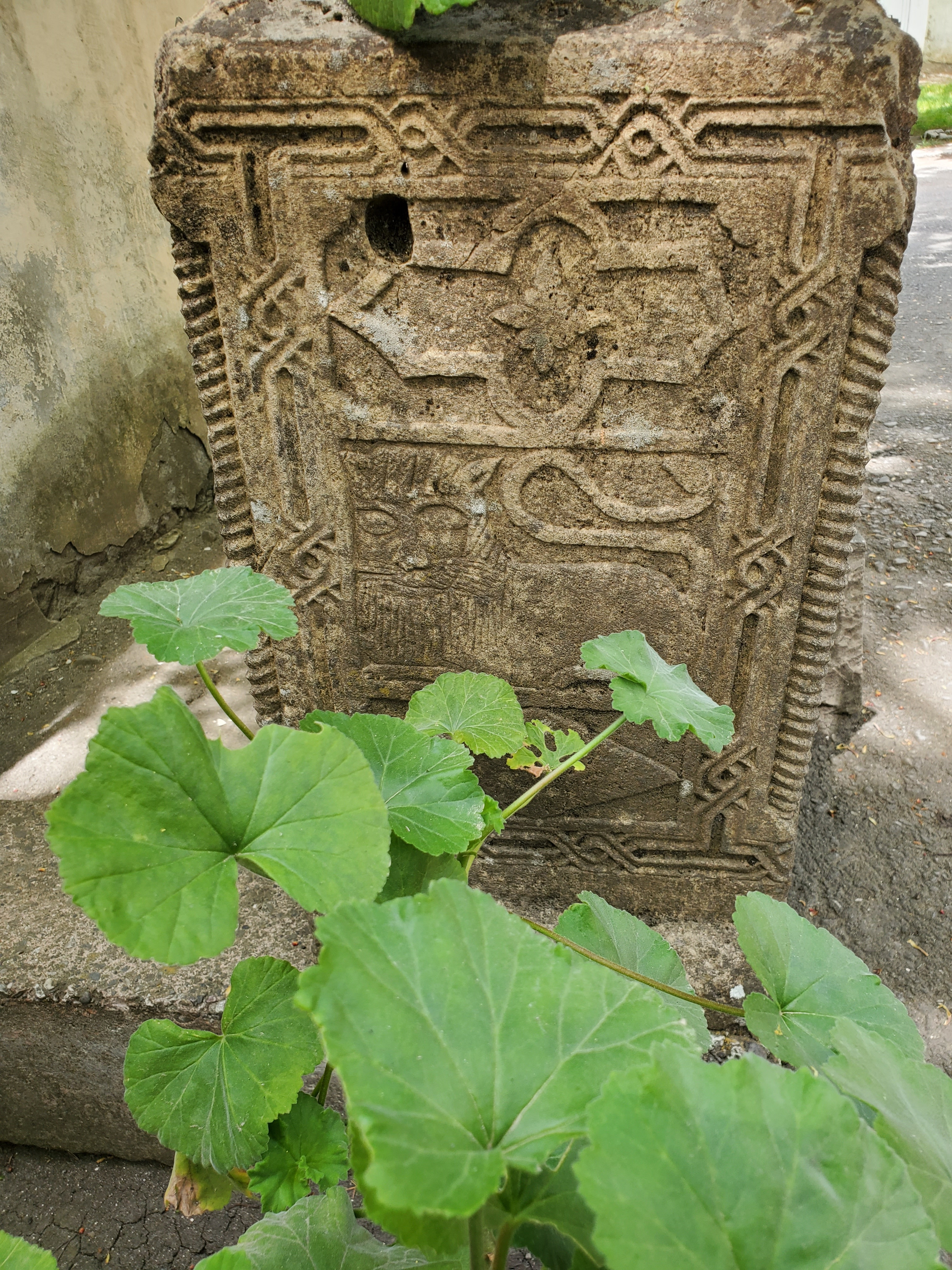

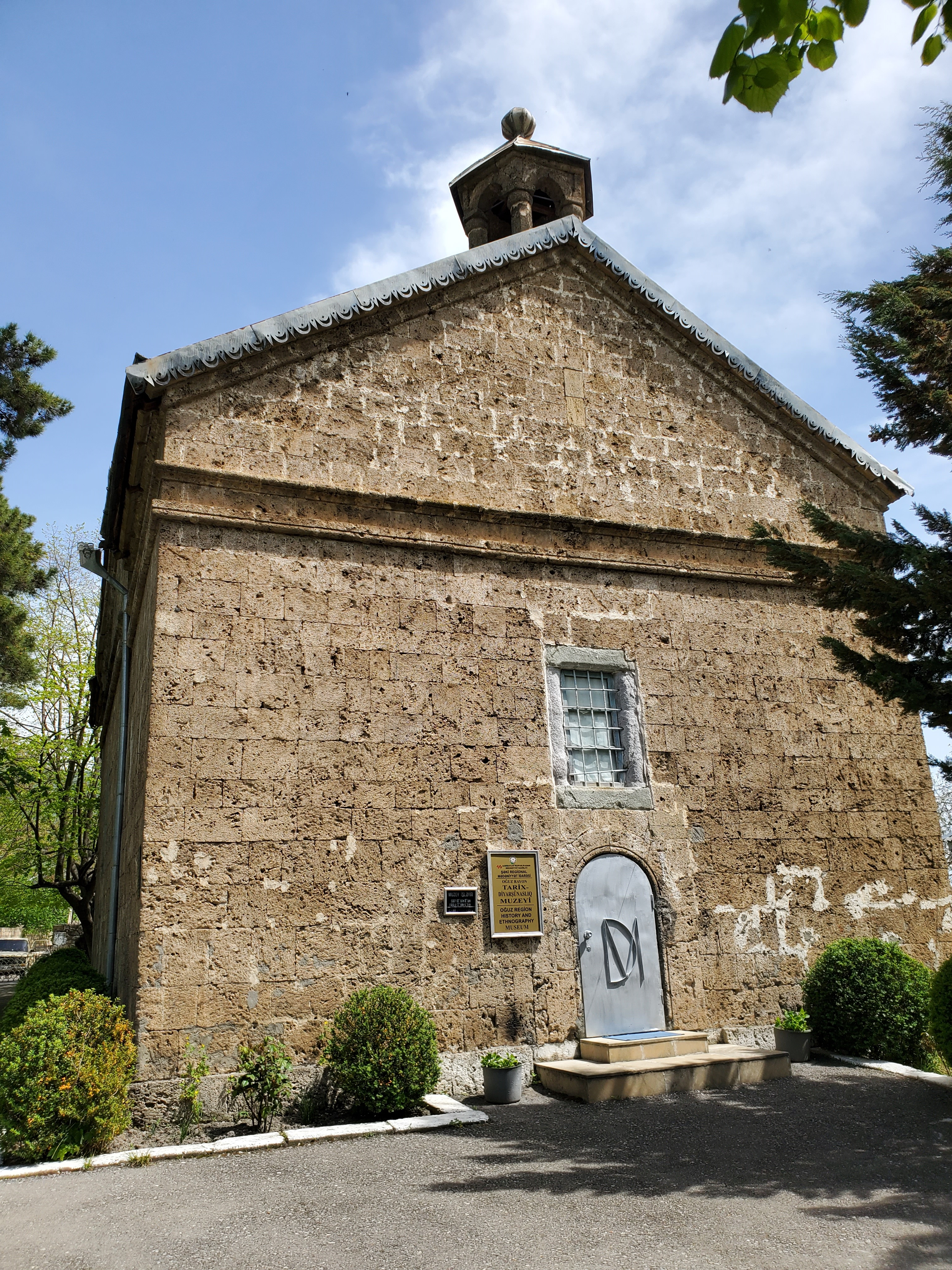

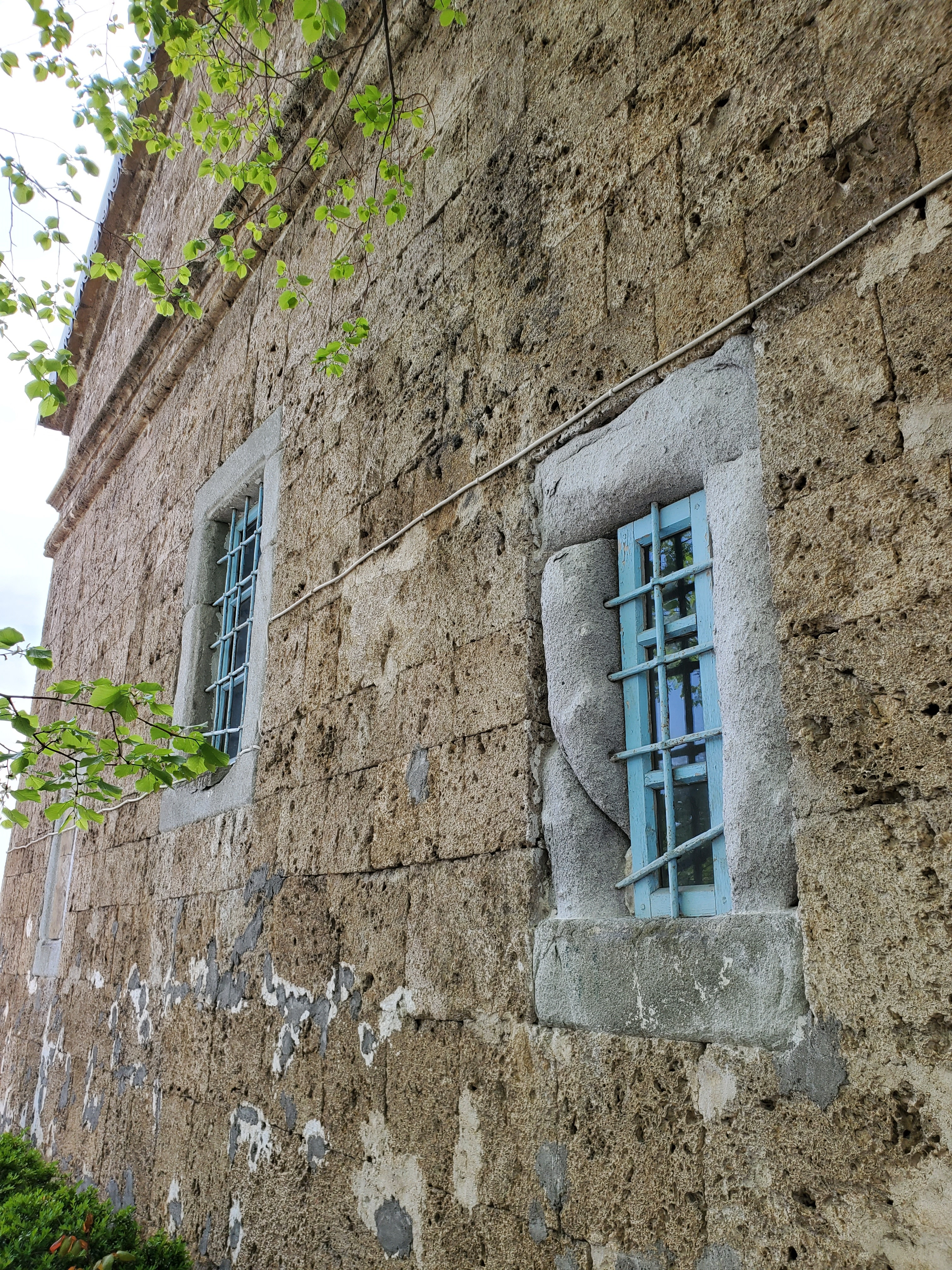

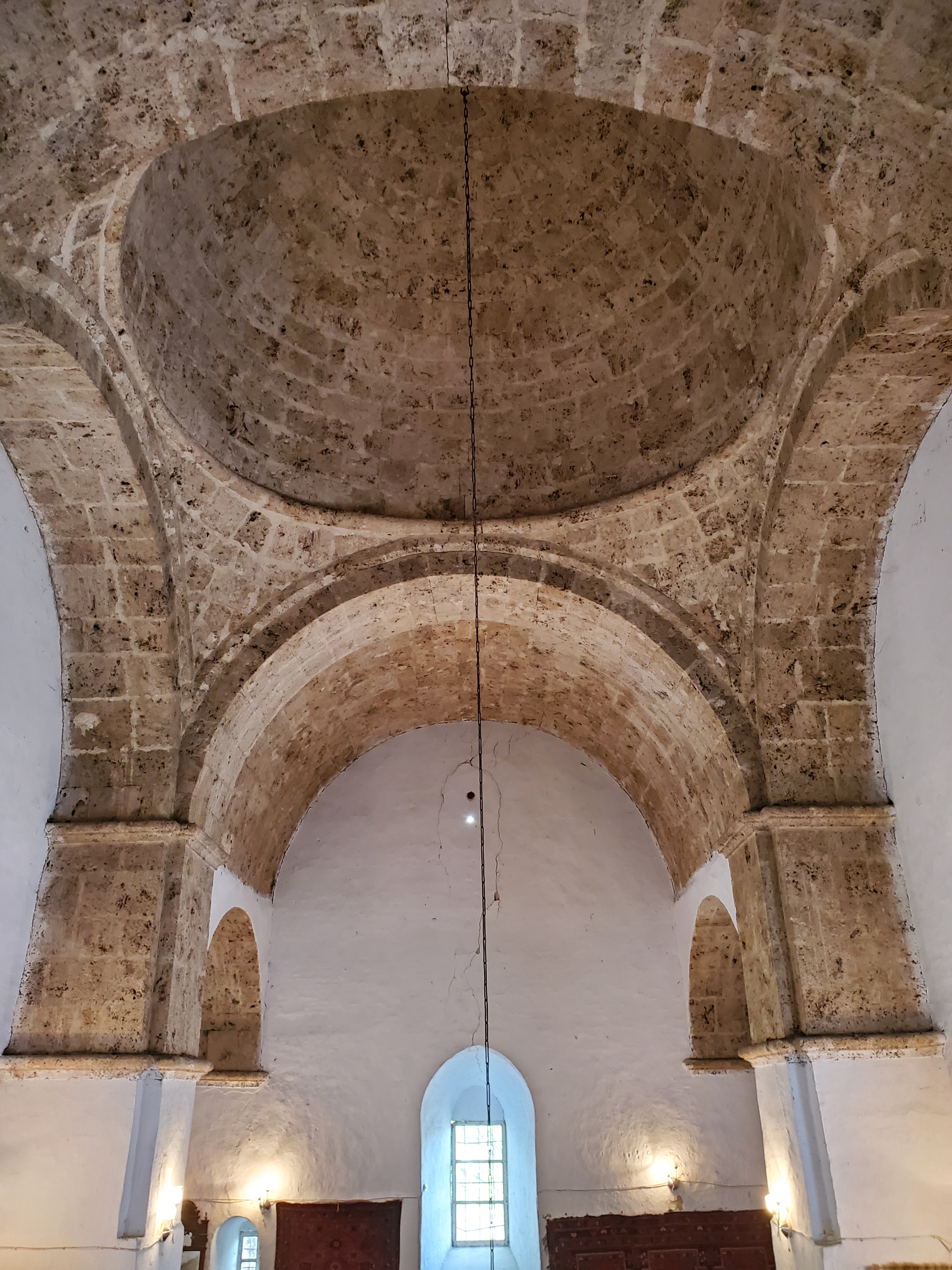

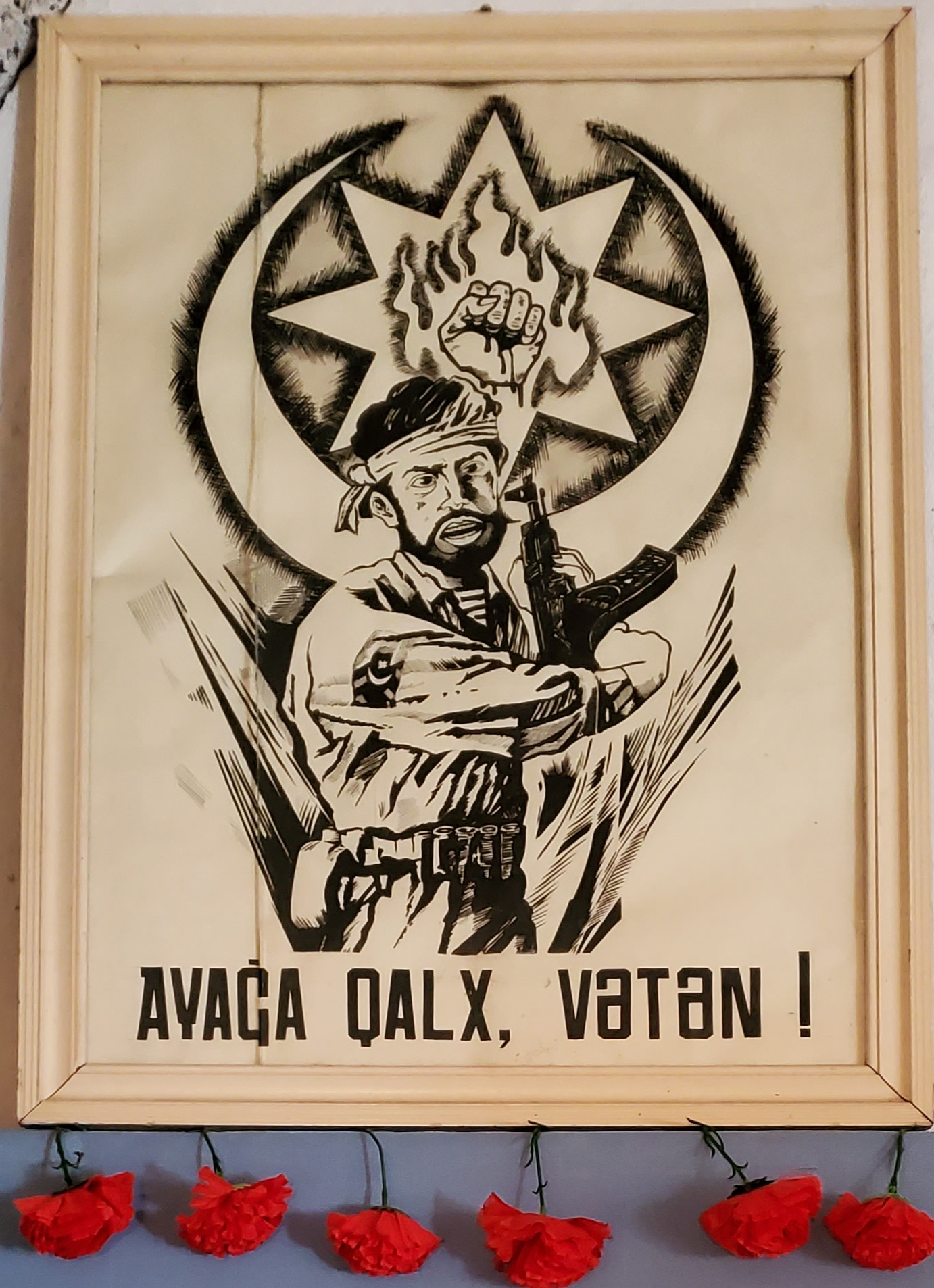

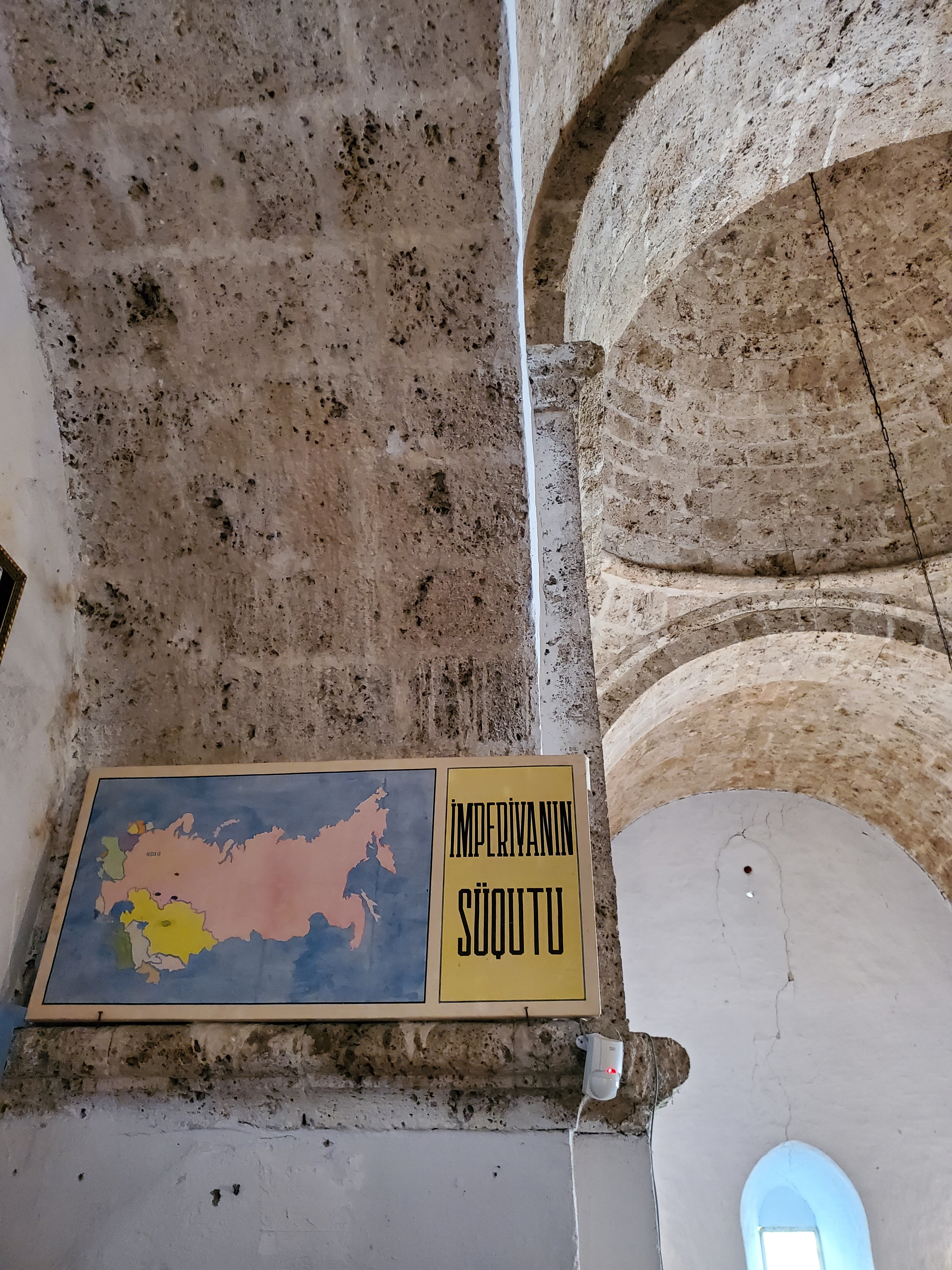

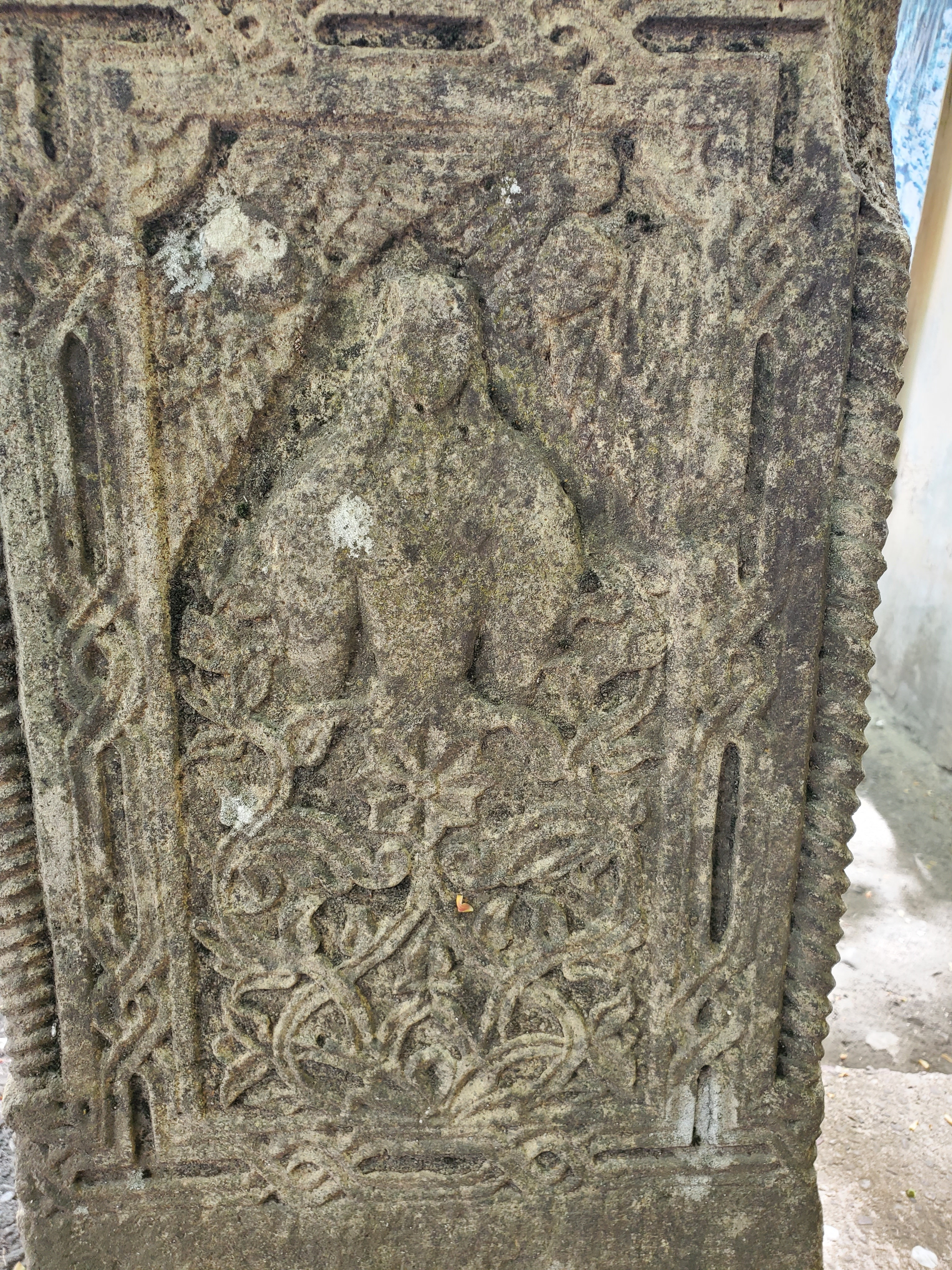

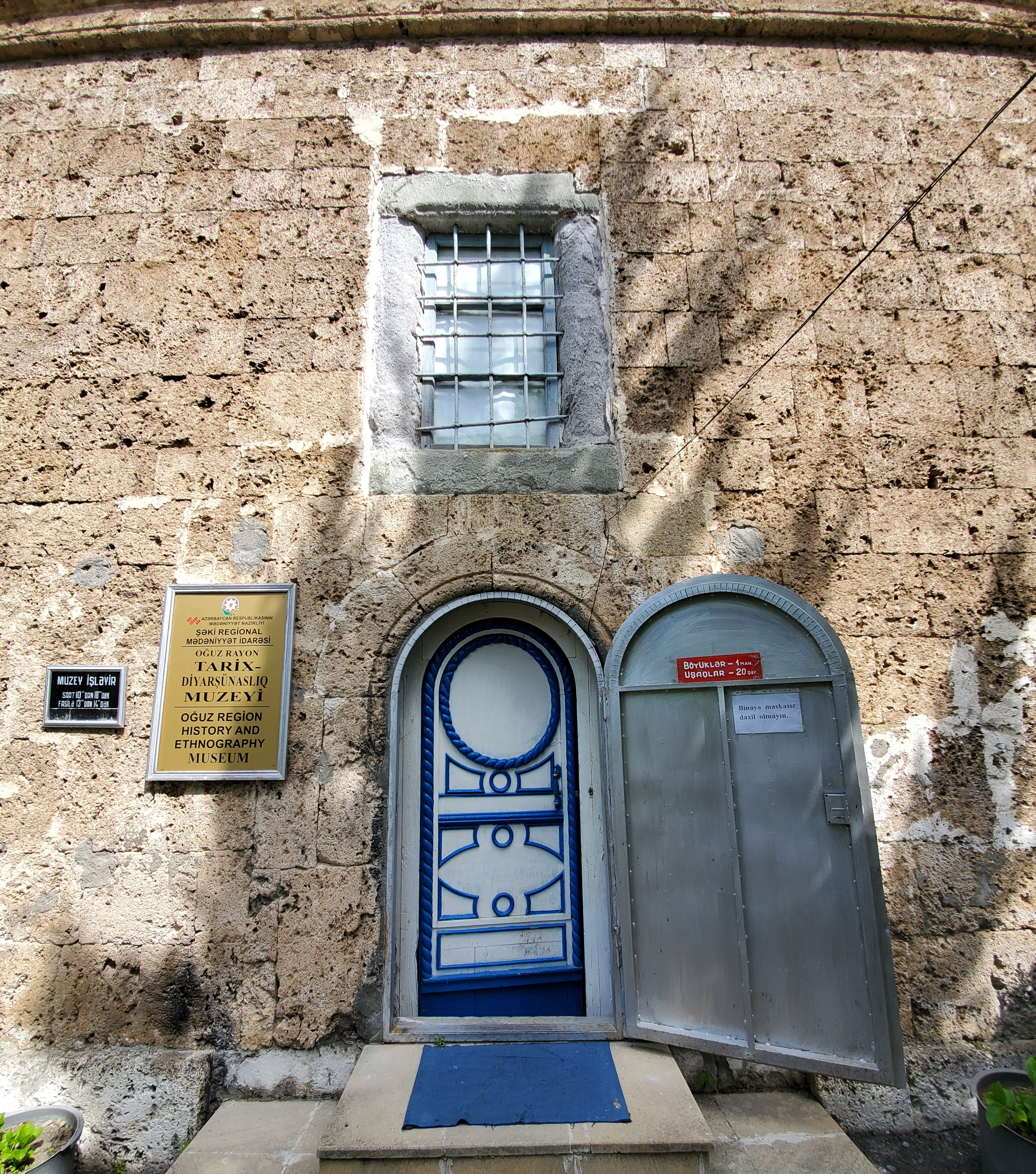

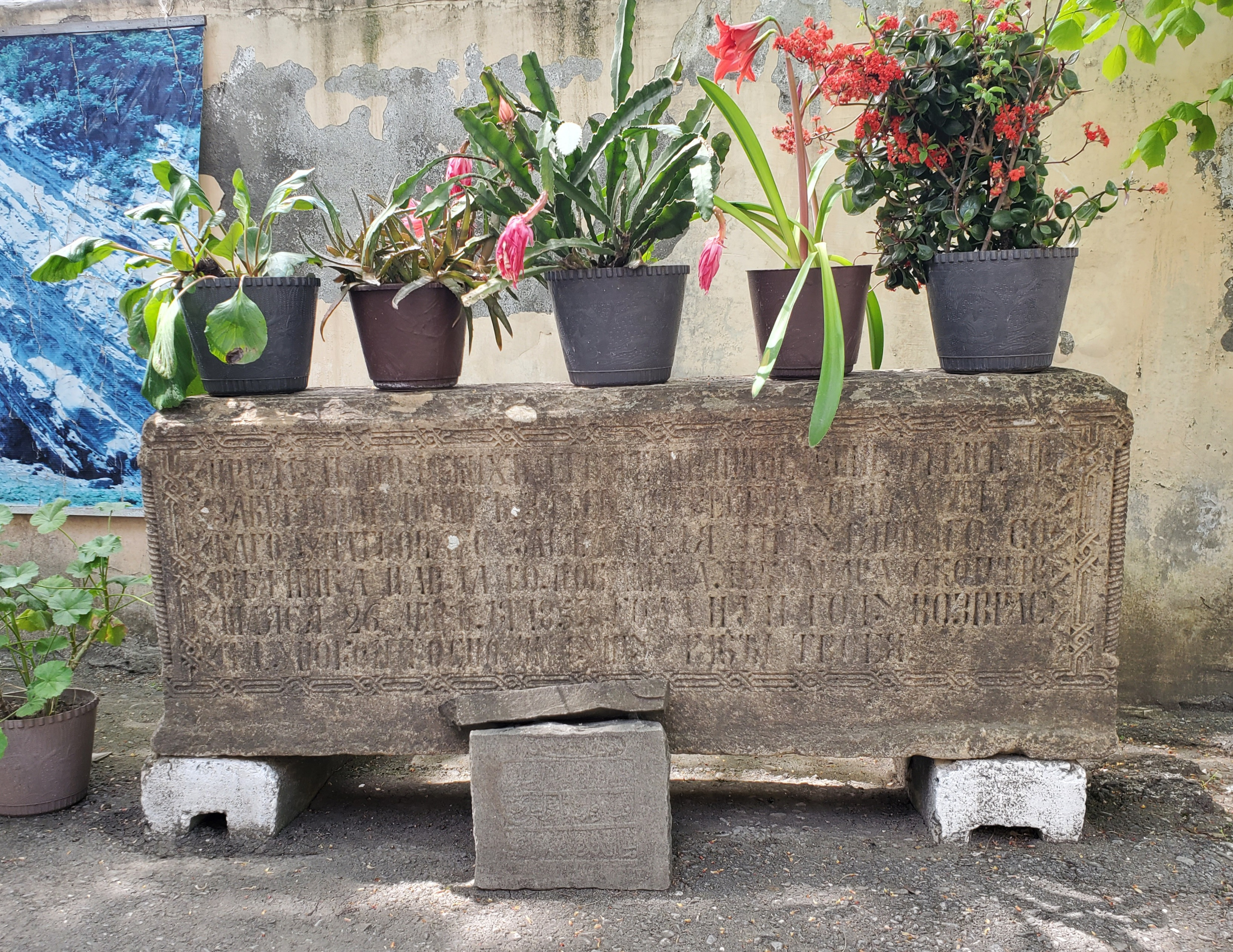

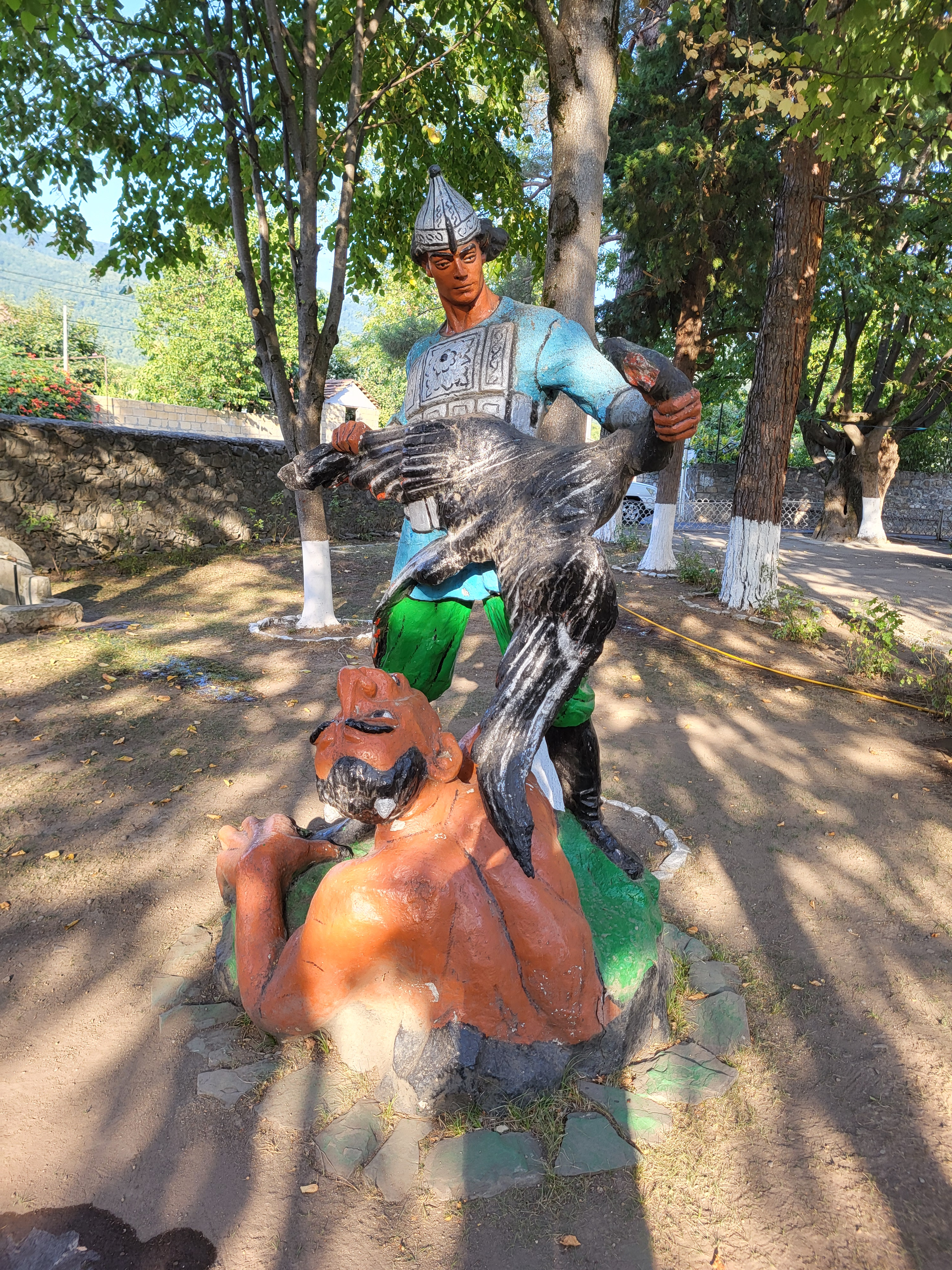
