= Bash Abaran =

Bash Abaran may refer to:

- Aparan, a city in Armenia
- Battle of Bash Abaran, battle fought there
