= Zinobiani =

Zinobiani ზინობიანი
- Village

- Location within Georgia
- Coordinates: 41.898111°N 45.934035°E
- Country: Georgia (country)
- Municipality: Qvareli Municipality
- Region: Kakheti

Population (2014)
  - Total: 337

Zinobiani (Georgian: ზინობიანი), formerly Oktomberi (Georgian: ოქტომბერი, between 1938 and 2010) is a village in Georgia. It is located in eastern Georgia, in the Qvareli Municipality of the Kakheti region. It has been one of the main places of compact residence of the Udis since 1920s.

== History ==
It was founded in 1922 by Orthodox Udis from the city of Vartashen (modern Oğuz, Azerbaijan), who came to Georgia in search of refuge from Armenian-Azerbaijani conflict of 1918-1920s. The resettlement was led by Zinobi Silikashvili. The first group of settlers arrived in 1922 and chose a place for settlement, in 1924 further 22 families settled there. Silikashvili was arrested and executed in 1938, village was renamed Oktomberi until 2010.

== Population ==
Bust of Zinobi Silikashvili in Zinobiani with Georgian and Caucasian Albanian inscriptions

According to the 1989 census, the number of Udis in Georgia was estimated at 93 people. At the beginning of the 21st century there were about 50 Udi households in the village, or about 300 people. According to the 2002 census, out of 412 villagers, Georgians made up 49%, Udis - also 49% or 203 people.

Living in a Georgian environment, the Zinobiani Udis underwent significant assimilation. Until the 1950s the marriages of the villagers were concluded only between the Udis, including the ones from Azerbaijan (from Nij and Vartashen). Since the 1950s contacts with Georgians became more intensive, since in connection with the introduction of compulsory secondary education, Udi pupils began to attend the neighboring Georgian village (there was only an 8-year school in Zinobiani itself). After the collapse of the USSR, the contacts of the Zinobiani with the Udi from Azerbaijan decreased and the process of assimilation intensified, often ended up with mixed Udi-Georgian marriages. According to Roland Topchishvili, out of 122 married couples currently living in the village, in 70 cases the wives are Udi (49 of them are natives of Zinobiani, others are natives of Nij and Vartashen), and in 47 cases the wives are Georgian.

The surnames of the Zinobiani Udis, as a rule, contain the Georgian suffix -shvili, cf. Silikov ~ Silikashvili, Bezhanov ~ Bezhanishvili, etc. In recent years, the model of forming a surname by adding the suffix -g'aria (from Udi: g'ar, lit. 'son') has also spread, cf. Bezhanishvili ~ Bezhanigaria.
