= Ərmənət =

- Municipality
- Location within Azerbaijan Location within Shaki-Zagatala Economic Region
- Coordinates: 41°03′53″N 47°34′06″E
- Country: Azerbaijan
- Rayon: Oghuz

Population
  - Total: 707
- Time zone: UTC+4 (AZT)
  - Summer (DST): UTC+5 (AZT)

Ərmənət (also, Armenat and Ermenet) is a village and municipality in the Oghuz Rayon of Azerbaijan. It has a population of 707.
