= Dəymədərə =

- Municipality
- Location within Azerbaijan Location within Shaki-Zagatala Economic Region
- Coordinates: 40°56′50″N 47°33′01″E
- Country: Azerbaijan
- Rayon: Oghuz

Population
  - Total: 501
- Time zone: UTC+4 (AZT)
  - Summer (DST): UTC+5 (AZT)

Dəymədərə (also, Daymadere and Deymedere) is a village and municipality in the Oghuz Rayon of Azerbaijan. It has a population of 501.
