= Vartaşenqışlaq =

- Location within Azerbaijan Location within Shaki-Zagatala Economic Region
- Coordinates: 41°04′38″N 47°28′02″E
- Country: Azerbaijan
- Rayon: Oghuz
- Time zone: UTC+4 (AZT)
  - Summer (DST): UTC+5 (AZT)

Vartaşenqışlaq (also, Vartashenkyshlak, Vartaşen-Qışlaq, and Vartashen-Kyshlak) is a village in the Oghuz Rayon of Azerbaijan.
