= Aşağı Filfili =

Aşağı Filfili Lezgian: Филфилар
- Location within Azerbaijan Location within Shaki-Zagatala Economic Region
- Coordinates: 41°06′29″N 47°33′47″E
- Country: Azerbaijan
- Rayon: Oghuz
- Time zone: UTC+4 (AZT)
  - Summer (DST): UTC+5 (AZT)

Aşağı Filfili (also, Ashagy Fil’fili) or Filfilar (also. Filfil, Lezgian: Филфилар) is a Lezgin village in the Oghuz Rayon of Azerbaijan.
