= Anwar Seyidov =

Azerbaijani lawyer (1949–2025)

Anwar Seyidov (Azerbaijani: Ənvər Seyidov; 29 March 1949 – 2 August 2025) was an Azerbaijani lawyer.

== Life and career ==
Seyidov was born in Vartashen (now Oghuz) on 29 March 1949. He studied law at the University of Azerbaijan. After working in various fields of health and communications, which began in 1964, he served as director of the VVA Archives, chief adviser to the Notariat and VVA Administration, and judge of the District Courts of Zagatala. He served as judge of the Supreme Court of Azerbaijan from 1990 to 2000, the Azerbaijani Court of Serious Crimes from 2000 to 2019, and the Baku High Criminal Court from 2011 to 2019.

Seyidov died on 2 August 2025, at the age of 76.
