= Agiya Nakhchivanli =

Azerbaijani politician (born 1950)

Agiya Nakhchivanli Aqiyə Naxçıvanlı
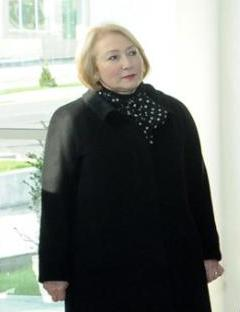

Member of National Assembly of Azerbaijan for 117th Oguz-Gabala district
- In office 7 November 2010 – 23 September 2024

Personal details
- Born: 11 March 1950 (age 76) Vartashen, Azerbaijani SSR, Soviet Union
- Party: YAP

Agiya Habib gizi Nakhchivanli (Azerbaijani: Aqiyə Həbib qızı Naxçıvanlı; born 11 March 1950) is an Azerbaijani politician. From 2010 to 2024, she served as the Member of National Assembly from the 117th Oguz-Gabala electoral district. Prior to her political career, she served as rector of the Azerbaijan Teachers' Institute. She has served as chairman of the Family, Women and Children's Affairs Committee of the National Assembly and is a recipient of Honorary Teacher of the Republic of Azerbaijan.

== Early life and career ==
Nakhchivanli was born on 11 March 1950 in Vartashen. From 1967 to 1972, she studied at what the Baku Slavic University. In 1972, she began working as a Russian language teacher at secondary school No. 2 of the Vartashen (now Oguz) District. Soon she was elected chairman of the school and teaching Komsomol organization. In 1996, by the decision of the Higher Attestation Commission under the President of the Republic of Azerbaijan, she was awarded the academic degree of Candidate of Sciences in Philosophy. In 2007, she was awarded the academic title of professor. From 2000 to 2005, she served as deputy chairman of the Women's Council of the Sabail District branch of the New Azerbaijan Party.

== Political career ==
Nakhchivanli was elected to the National Assembly of Azerbaijan from the 117th Oguz-Gabala electoral district during 2010 parliamentary elections, winning 55.10% of votes. She retained her seat in the 2015 and 2020 parliamentary elections.

== Personal life ==
Nakhchivanli is married to Huseyn Sharif oghlu Movsumov, the former deputy head of the territorial-organizational affairs department of the Administration of the President of the Republic of Azerbaijan, and has 2 children.
