= Yemişanlı, Oghuz =

Village in Azerbaijan

Yemişanlı is a municipality and village in the Oghuz Rayon of Azerbaijan. It has a population of 485.
