= Yemişanlı, Qabala =

Village in Azerbaijan

Yemişanlı is a municipality and village in the Qabala Rayon of Azerbaijan. It has a population of 755.
