= Movses Silikyan =

Armenian general (1862–1937)

Movses Silikyan Մովսես Սիլիկյան
- Movses Silikyan portrait
- Born: 14 September 1862; Vartashen, Elisabethpol Governorate, Russian Empire
- Died: 22 November 1937 (aged 75); Yerevan, Soviet Union
- Military career
- Allegiance: Russian Empire (1884–1917); First Republic of Armenia (1918–1920)
- Branch: Army
- Service years: 1884–1920
- Rank: Major general (Russia); Lieutenant general (Armenia)
- Commands: 6th Caucasian Infantry Regiment; 2nd Armenian Infantry Division; Army Corps Yerevan Detachment; Separate Armenian Division; Kars-Alexandropol front
- Conflicts: World War I; Battle of Bitlis; Battle of Erzurum; Battle of Sardarabad; Battle of Abaran; Georgian–Armenian War; Turkish–Armenian War
- Awards: see below

Movses Silikyan or Silikov (Armenian: Մովսես Սիլիկյան, Russian: Мойсей Силиков; 14 September 1862 – 22 November 1937) was an Armenian general who served in the Imperial Russian Army during World War I and later in the army of the First Republic of Armenia. He is regarded as a national hero in Armenia for his role in the Armenian victory at the Battle of Sardarabad.

Following Russia's withdrawal from Transcaucasia and conclusion of a separate peace with the Ottoman Empire under the Treaty of Brest-Litovsk in March 1918, Silikyan and other Armenian generals organized the defense of Armenia against invading Ottoman forces. After the Armenian victories at the battles of Sardarabad, Karakilisa and Bash Abaran in May 1918, the First Republic of Armenia declared its independence. Silikyan received the rank of lieutenant general of the Armenian army and held various top military positions.

Following the Sovietization of Armenia in 1920, Silikyan was exiled to Ryazan along with other high-ranking Armenian military officers, but was allowed to return to Armenia the next year. During the Great Purge of 1937, Silikyan was arrested and executed. He was rehabilitated in 1987.

== Early life and education ==
Silikyan was born on 14 September 1862 in the mixed Armenian-Udi village of Vartashen (present-day Oğuz, Azerbaijan) in the Nukha Uyezd of the Elisabethpol Governorate of the Russian Empire. He was of ethnic Udi origin. Silikyan graduated from the Moscow Military Gymnasium No. 1 and the Alexandrov Military School No. 3. Later, in 1904, he graduated from the Infantry Officers' School of the Oranienbaum Military Academy.

== Military career ==
Silikyan began his service in the Imperial Russian Army in 1884. After graduating from military school, he was appointed commander of a company in the 155th Kuban Regiment stationed in Kars with the rank of podporuchik. He served in the expeditionary force sent to Persia during the Russian occupation of Tabriz. He rose through the ranks of the army, eventually receiving the rank of colonel in 1914. On the eve of the First World War, he was the commander of the 6th Caucasian Infantry Regiment of General Tovmas Nazarbekyan's 2nd Caucasian Infantry Brigade (later division) in the Caucasus Army.

=== World War I – Caucasus Campaign ===
In the early stages of the Caucasus campaign, Silikyan's regiment crossed into northern Persia with the rest of the 2nd Caucasian Brigade and defeated Ottoman forces at the Battle of Dilman in April 1915. In January–February 1916, Silikyan commanded the rearguard during the Battle of Erzurum and was appointed commandant of the city following its capture. In late March 1916, Silikyan's forces were stationed in Bitlis. In early April, he was ordered to leave two battalions in Bitlis and advance toward Mush. In Mush, Silikyan assisted Garo Sassouni in forming militia detachments consisting of Armenians from Mush and Sasun. Also under Silikyan's command was the 2nd Armenian Volunteer Battalion commanded by Drastamat Kanayan (Dro).

After the February Revolution, Silikyan was appointed commander of the Van detachment. Some time later he was appointed brigade commander. In August 1917, he received the rank of major general. Silikyan received various honors during the war, including the Saint George Sword.

== First Republic of Armenia ==
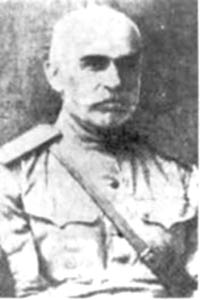
Movses Silikyan

After the October Revolution in November 1917, the Caucasus Army disintegrated. Soviet Russia signed the Armistice of Erzincan with the Ottoman Empire in December 1917, and virtually all Russian forces had left the Caucasus front by the end of the year, leaving only badly outnumbered Armenian forces to defend the frontline against the Ottomans. Silikyan was in Van until January 1918, when he was called to Tiflis by the Armenian National Council and appointed commander of the 2nd Armenian Infantry Division by General Nazarbekyan.

On 3 March 1918, Soviet Russia signed the Treaty of Brest-Litovsk, which stipulated the cession of the districts of Batum, Kars, and Ardahan to the Ottoman Empire. By May 1918, the Ottoman Third Army had retaken the territory earlier captured by Russia and advanced to capture Batum, Kars, Ardahan, and Alexandropol. At the battles of Sardarabad and Bash Abaran, Silikyan's forces (the Yerevan detachment) put a halt to the Ottoman advance. These victories are credited with preventing the total destruction of the Armenian nation at the hands of the Ottoman army. On 28 May 1918, the First Republic of Armenia was declared, which soon after signed the Treaty of Batum with the Ottoman Empire, putting an end to the hostilities at the cost of severe territorial concessions.

On 26 June 1918, Silikyan was appointed commander of the sole Armenian division allowed to be maintained according to the conditions of the Treaty of Batum. He participated in the Armeno-Georgian War of December 1918. On 25 March 1919, the Military Council of the Armenian Army was created with General Nazarbekyan as its chairman; Silikyan was appointed a member of the council on April 24. On June 1 he received the rank of lieutenant general of the Armenian Army. In April 1920 Silikyan was appointed Governor-General of the provinces of Nor Bayazet and Daralagyaz. The main purpose of his appointment was to provide support to Drastamat Kanayan's expedition to Mountainous Karabagh. During the Bolshevik-led May Uprising in 1920, Silikyan was taken prisoner by the Bolshevik rebels, but was freed after the suppression of the uprising.

In September 1920, Turkish nationalist forces loyal to the Government of the Grand National Assembly started the Turkish–Armenian War in order to capture territory from Armenia and prevent the cession of four Ottoman provinces to Armenia according to the Treaty of Sèvres. During the war, Silikyan commanded the Kars-Alexandropol front from his headquarters in Alexandropol. On 4 November 1920, Silikyan was ordered by General Nazarbekyan to request a ceasefire from the Turkish forces.

== Later life and death ==
Following the Armenian defeat in the Turkish–Armenian War and the Sovietization of Armenia, Silikyan was arrested along with other high-ranking Armenian military officers and forced to walk from Yerevan to Aghstafa, whence they were taken by train to Ryazan. He was allowed to return to Armenia in September 1921. Silikyan first found work as an accountant at a Swedish company's branch in Alexandropol, then began working for the American Committee for Relief in the Near East, which provided humanitarian relief for survivors of the Armenian genocide. Silikyan also maintained correspondence with his old commander Tovmas Nazarbekyan in Tiflis and helped the latter compile his memoirs.

Silikyan was arrested by the Soviet authorities in 1927 and sent into internal exile in Rostov-on-Don by administrative decision, but was allowed to return to Armenia the same year. He was arrested again in November 1935 and accused of holding monarchist views, persecuting communists during his time as Governor-General of Nor Bayazet, and maintaining contacts with members of the outlawed Armenian Revolutionary Federation. Silikyan was released in February 1936 after signing an affidavit not to leave Yerevan.

The criminal case against Silikyan was dropped in April 1936. However, in 1937, during Joseph Stalin's Great Purge, Silikyan was arrested once again and sentenced to death by decision of an NKVD troika on 16 November 1937. Silikyan and another former Armenian general, Christophor Araratov, were accused of being members of a "counterrevolutionary officers' organization" involving multiple high-ranking officers of the Red Army (these accusations also formed the basis of the Tukhachevsky case). Silikyan was executed on 22 November 1937. He was rehabilitated on 10 November 1987 by decision of the Supreme Court of the Armenian SSR.

Ivan Bagramyan, who served under Silikyan and later became Marshal of the Soviet Union, described him as "the most talented out of all the Armenian commanders" of the period of World War I and the First Republic of Armenia. Silikyan's contemporary, the historian Hovhannes Ter-Martirosyan (A-Do), described him as "a short, humble man with a kind face who did not know Armenian, but was an exemplary Armenian person."

== Legacy and honors ==
- (Russian Empire) Order of Saint Stanislaus, 2nd class (1910)
- (Russian Empire) Order of St. George (1916)

These were restored to him (his descendants) after rehabilitation.

== See also ==
- First Republic of Armenia

== Bibliography ==
- Hovannisian, Richard G. (1996). The Republic of Armenia, Vol. IV: Between Crescent and Sickle, Partition and Sovietization. Berkeley: University of California Press. ISBN 0-520-08804-2.
- Karapetyan, M. L. (2012). "Генерал-лейтенант Мовсес Силикян (К 150-летию со дня рождения)" [General Lieutenant Movses Silikyan (on the occasion of his 150th birth anniversary)]. Lraber Hasarakakan Gitutyunneri (in Russian). 4 (4): 291–294 – via Pan-Armenian Digital Library.
- Sahakyan, Ruben (2012). "Գեներալ-լեյտենանտ Մովսես Սիլիկյան (կենսագրության անհայտ էջեր)" [Lieutenant-General Movses Silikyan (unknown pages of biography)]. Patma-Banasirakan Handes (in Armenian) (2): 63–74 – via Pan-Armenian Digital Library.
