= Battle of Abaran =

1918 battle

Battle of Bash Abaran
- Part of the Caucasus campaign of World War I
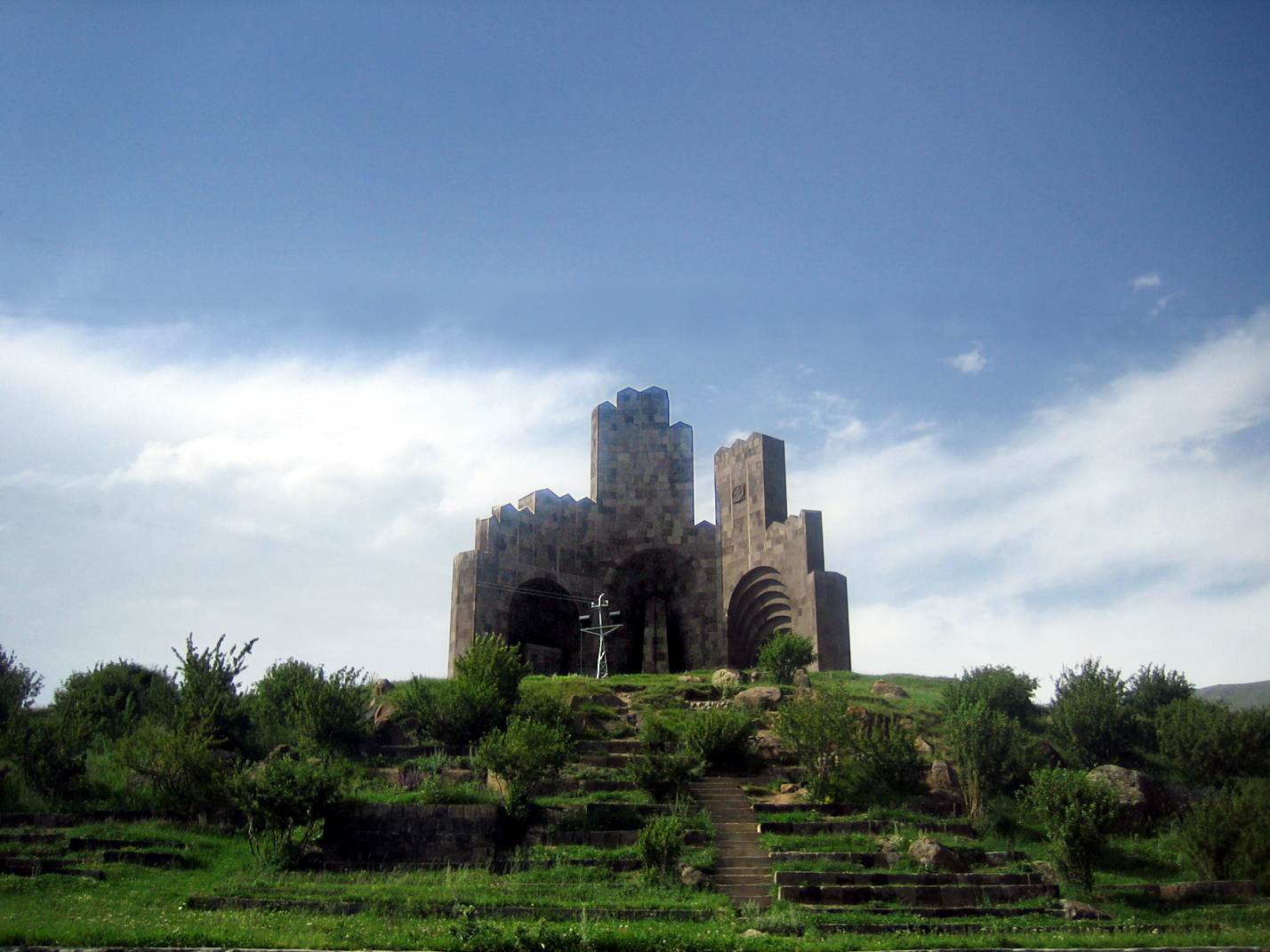
- Monument to the Battle of Bash-Aparan, Aparan, Armenia.
Date	May 23–29, 1918
Location	Bash Abaran, Armenia 40°35′21″N 44°21′26″E
Result	Armenian victory

Belligerents
Armenian National Council	Ottoman Empire

Commanders and leaders
Drastamat Kanayan; Movses Silikyan; Jangir Agha	Esad Pasa; Kezim Pasa

Strength
~12,000	~13,000
- Location within Armenia Battle of Abaran (Aragatsotn) Battle of Abaran (Caucasus Mountains)

The Battle of Bash Abaran (Armenian: Բաշ Աբարանի ճակատամարտ Bash Abarani chakatamart, Turkish: Baş-Abaran Muharebesi) was part of Caucasus Campaign of World War I that took place in the vicinity of Bash Abaran, in 1918. The Armenian victories at Bash Abaran, Sardarabad and Karakilisa, halted the Ottoman invasion of Eastern Armenia and were instrumental in allowing the formation of the short-lived First Republic of Armenia.

The Turkish forces attacked on 21 May, driving towards Yerevan. They were opposed by Armenian forces under the command of Drastamat Kanayan. One prong of the three-pronged Ottoman attack, consisting of the 3rd Regiment of the 11th Caucasian Division, moved down from Hamamlu. They met an Armenian force of about 1,000 riflemen under the command of Movses Silikyan at the defile of Bash Abaran, about a three-hour march from Yerevan. After three days of fierce fighting the Armenians launched a counter-attack against the Turks on 25 May. The Turkish forces then retreated north back to Hamamlu on 29 May.
