= Yukhari Mahalla Synagogue =

Synagogue in Oğuz, Azerbaijan

- Azerbaijani: Yuxarı məhəllə sinaqoqu
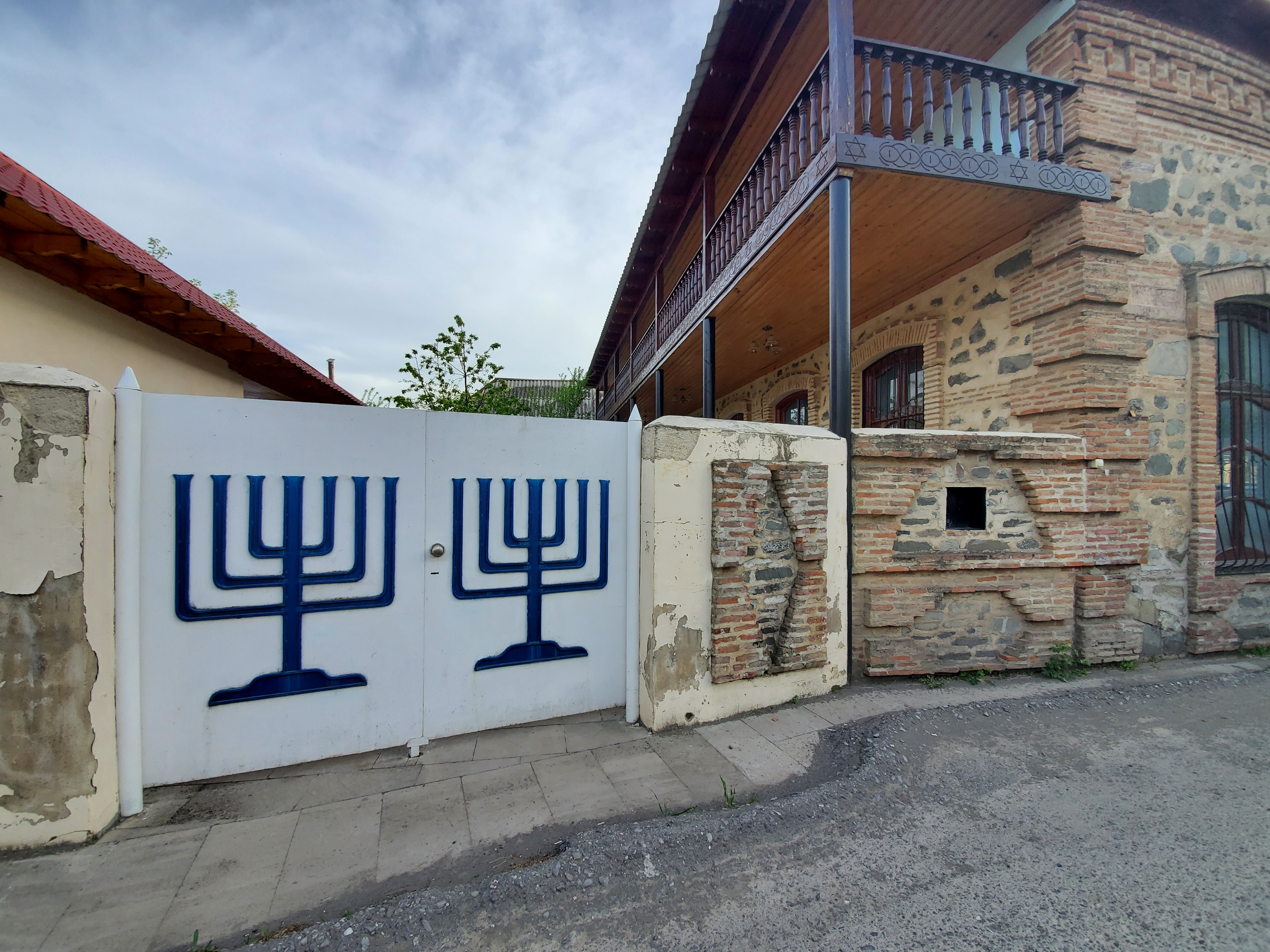

- Location in Azerbaijan

Religion
- Affiliation: Judaism
- Ecclesiastical or organizational status: Synagogue
- Status: Active

Location
- Location: Arzu Aliyeva Street, Oghuz
- Country: Azerbaijan
- Interactive map of Yukhari Mahalla Synagogue
- Coordinates: 41°04′03″N 47°27′34″E

Architecture
- Type: Synagogue architecture
- Completed: 1897
- Materials: Brick

Yukhari Mahalla Synagogue (Azerbaijani: Yuxarı məhəllə sinaqoqu, lit. 'Synagogue of the Upper Quarter'), is a synagogue located in the city of Oghuz in the Republic of Azerbaijan.

== History ==
The Synagogue of the Upper Quarter, located on the Arzu Aliyeva Street in the city of Oghuz, was built in 1897 with the assistance and guidance of Rabbi Barukh. After Soviet occupation, the synagogue, like other places of worship, was closed and later used as a warehouse.

Already during the times of the independence of the Republic of Azerbaijan, the synagogue was restored by the local Jews in 2004–2006. It is currently used as a place of worship where every Friday and Saturday the synagogue is visited by the Jews of Oghuz to pray.

== Gallery ==
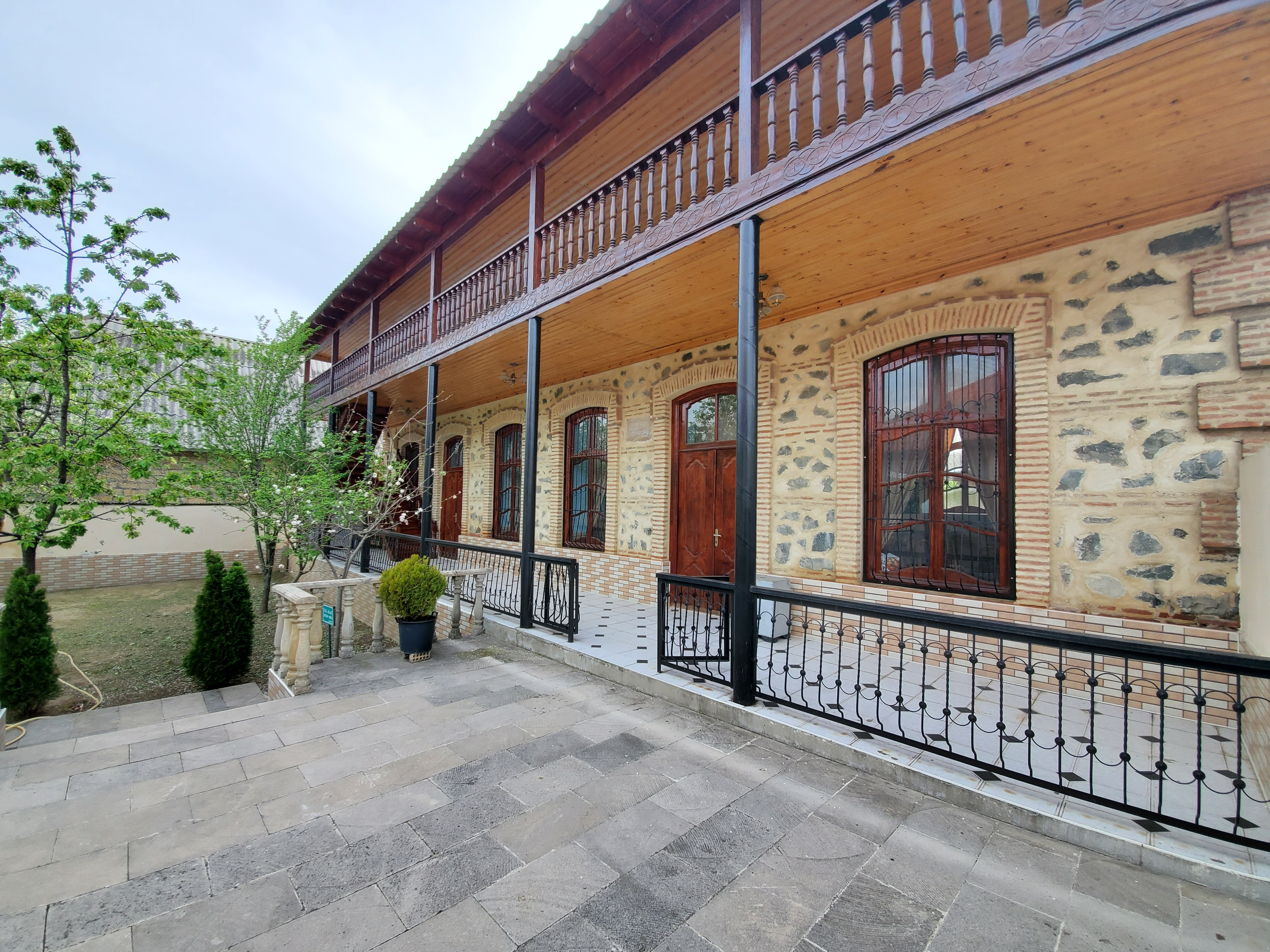

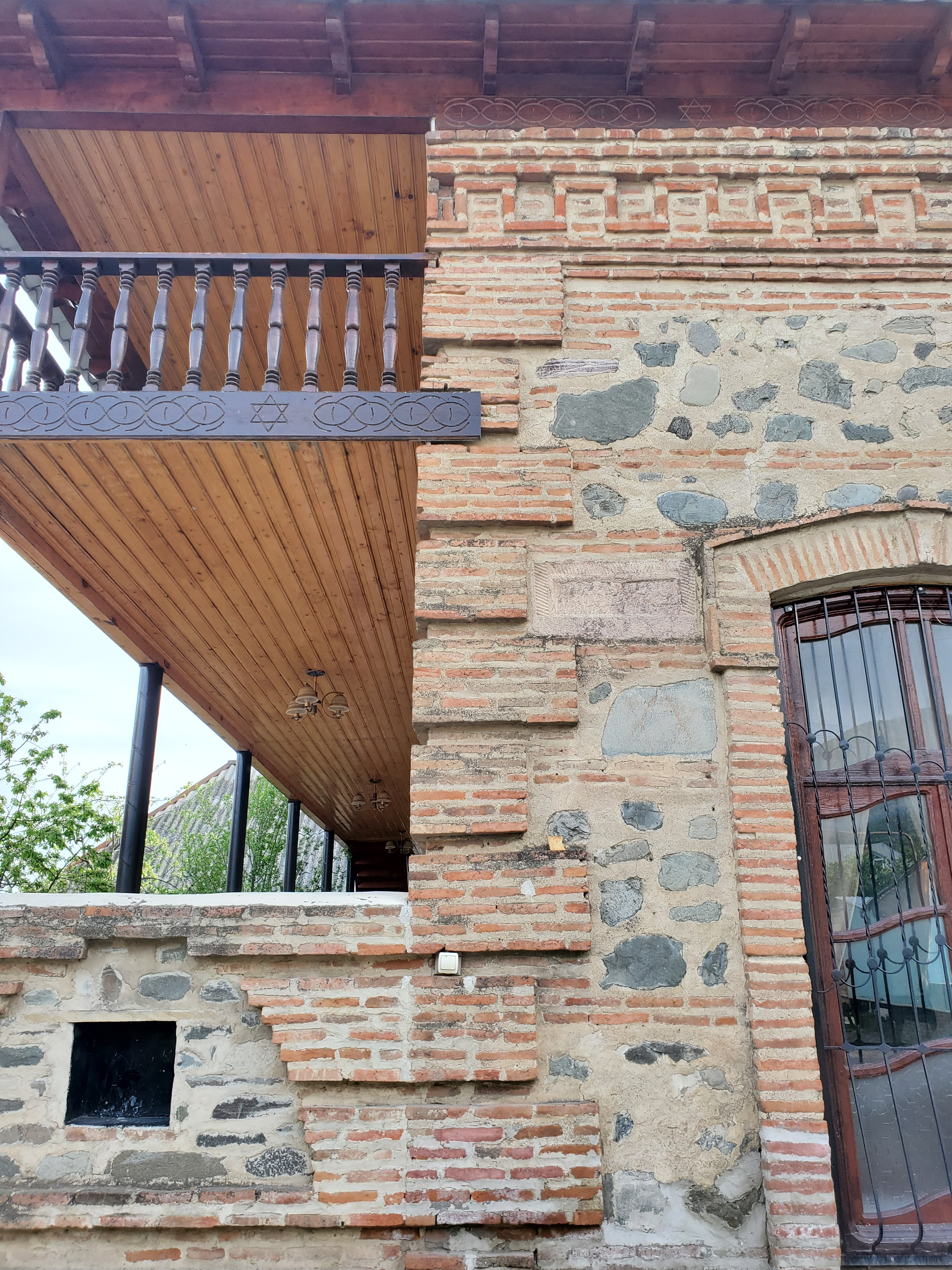

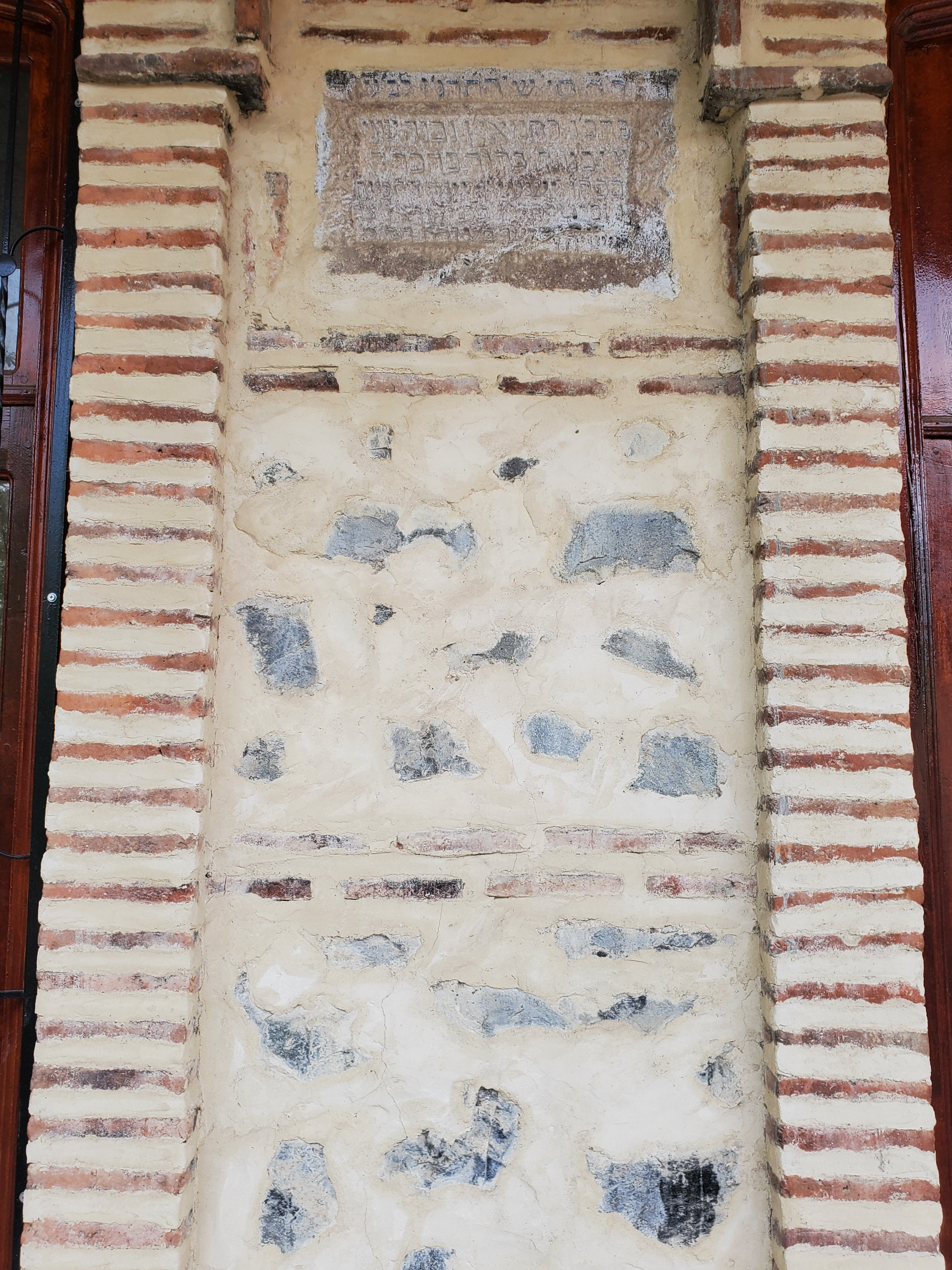

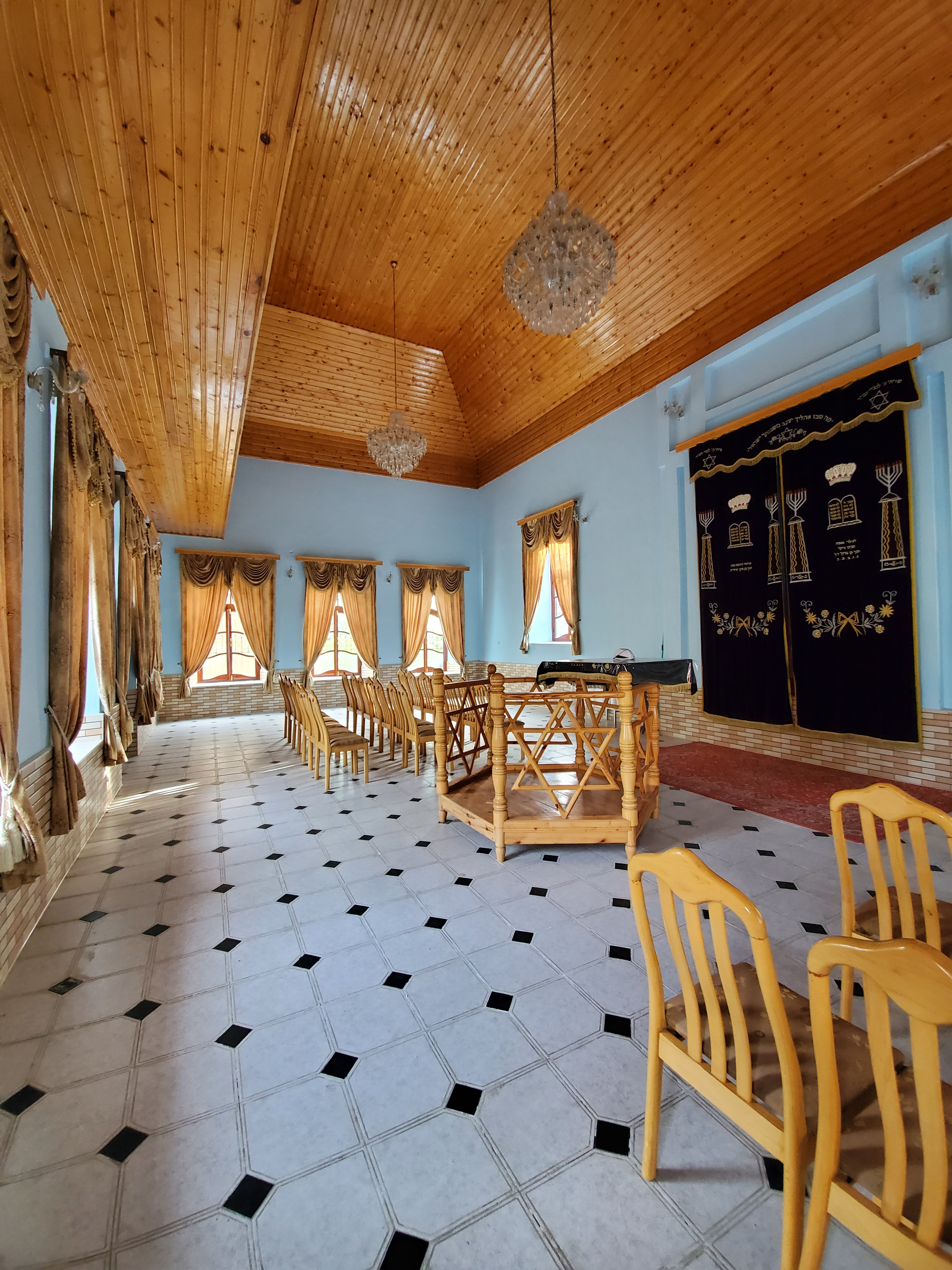

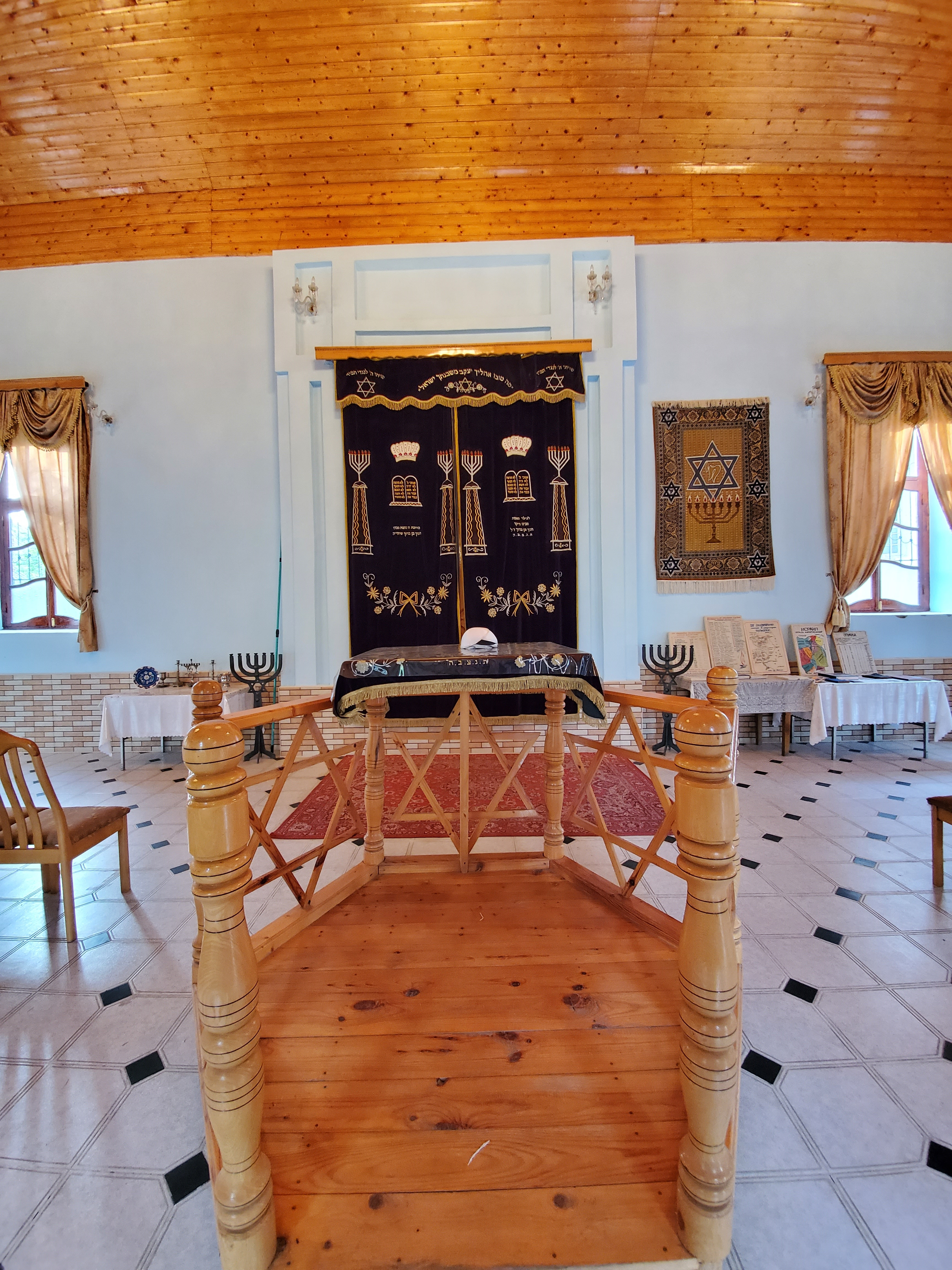

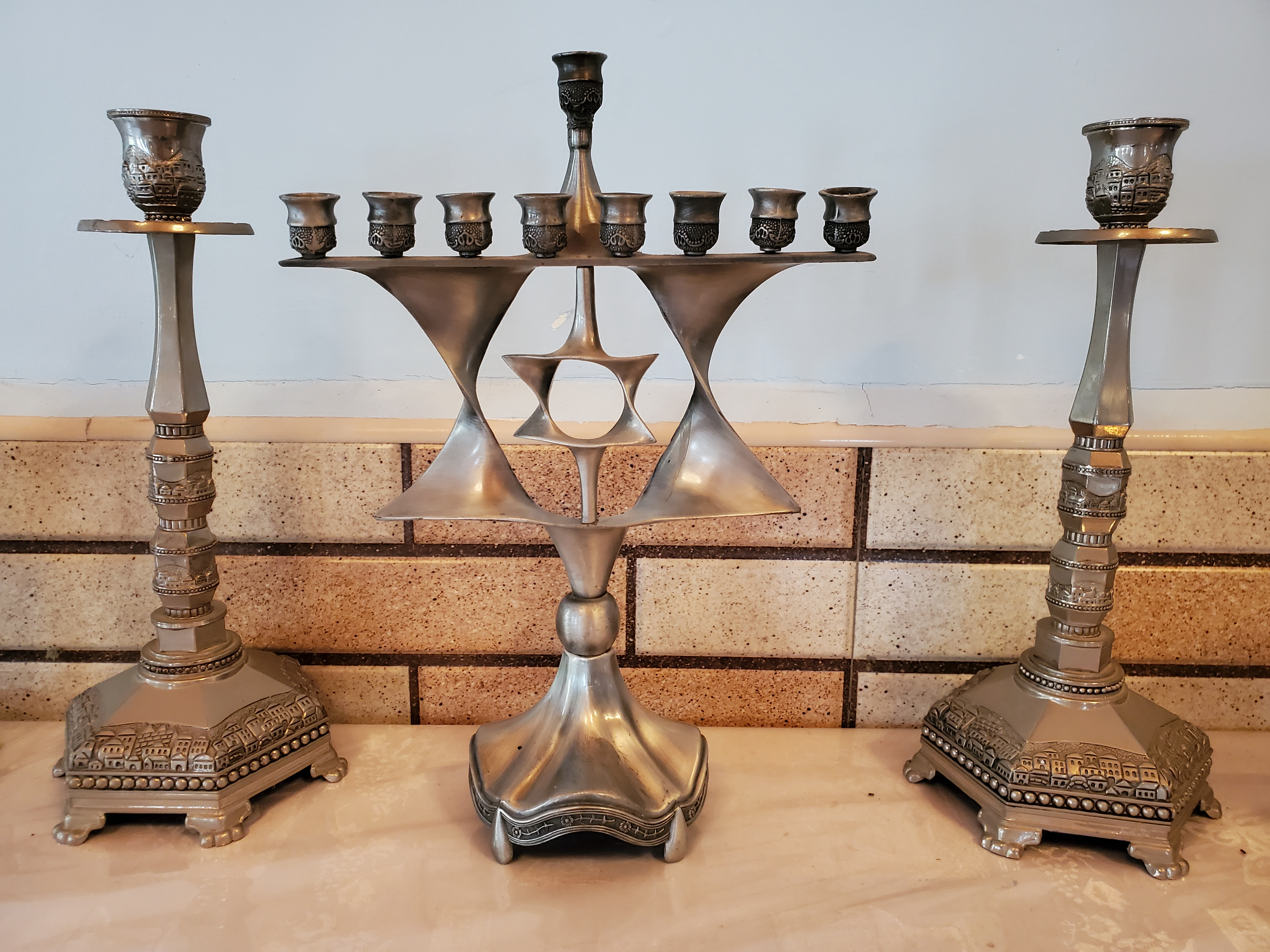

== See also ==
- History of the Jews in Azerbaijan
- List of synagogue in Azerbaijan
