= Oğuz (city) =

City and municipality in Oghuz, Azerbaijan

- City & municipality
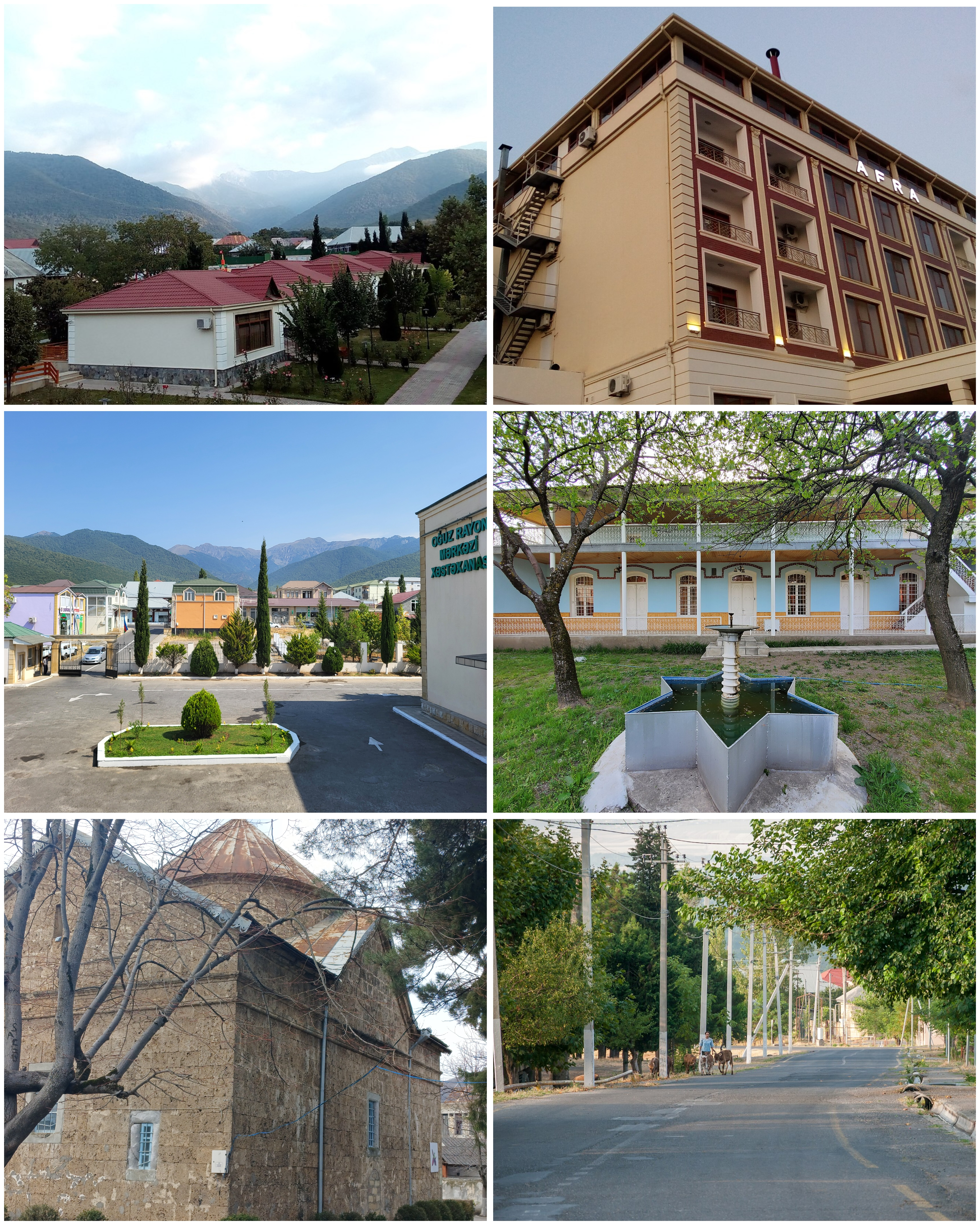
- Clockwise from top: Houses in Oghuz; AFRA Hotel; Ashaghi Mahalla Synagogue; Street in Oghuz; History museum (former Church of Saint Elisæus); View of Oghuz

- Location within Azerbaijan Location within Shaki-Zagatala Economic Region
- Coordinates: 41°04′15″N 47°27′30″E
- Country: Azerbaijan
- District: Oghuz
- Established: 1968
- Elevation: 630 m (2,070 ft)

Population (2010)
  - Total: 7,002
- Time zone: UTC+4 (AZT)
- Area code: +994 024

Oğuz (Oghuz) is a city, municipality and the capital of the Oghuz District of Azerbaijan. The village was mainly populated by Udis before the exodus of Armenians from Azerbaijan after the outbreak of the Nagorno-Karabakh conflict.

== Etymology ==
The name Oghuz comes from the Oghuz Turks, which Azerbaijanis are a part of.

Before 1991 the town was called Vartashen (Armenian: Վարդաշեն), which means town of roses in Armenian; 'Vard' meaning rose and 'shen' meaning town or village. This is in reference to the abundance of roses that naturally grow in this place. A colophon on Armenian manuscript dating to 1466 suggests possibly earlier bilingual variants of the name: Giwlstan (Armenian: Գիւլստան), and Vardud (Armenian: Վարդուդ).

The town was renamed to Oghuz in 1991 during the expulsion of the Armenian and autochthonous Udi population.

== Population ==
Until 1991, Vartashen was mainly a Udi village, where the Vartashen dialect of the Udi language was spoken by about 3000 people in the 1980s. The Udis of Vartashen belonged to the Armenian and Gregorian Church and had Armenian surnames.

During the First Nagorno-Karabakh War, most Udis of the town were expelled by the local activists of Popular Front of Azerbaijan. The Udis, bearing Armenian names and belonging to both the Armenian and the Gregorian Church, had been viewed as Armenians and hence suffered the same fate as other Armenians in Azerbaijan. Some 50 Udi people remained in the town.

There were also Tat-speaking Mountain Jews in Vartashen. Most of them have emigrated to Israel, but possibly 80 have stayed.

== Climate ==
Climate data for Oghuz(WMO ID: 37668, normals for 1964-1991)
Month	Jan	Feb	Mar	Apr	May	Jun	Jul	Aug	Sep	Oct	Nov	Dec	Year
Average precipitation mm (inches)	44.6 (1.76)	50.6 (1.99)	80.9 (3.19)	94.2 (3.71)	102.5 (4.04)	96.8 (3.81)	60.4 (2.38)	54.5 (2.15)	65.6 (2.58)	95.9 (3.78)	64.7 (2.55)	45.9 (1.81)	856.6 (33.75)
Average precipitation days (≥ 0.01 in)	9.2	10	14.7	12.4	12	8.9	6.4	6.3	8	10.4	9	8	115.3
Source: NCEI

== Notable people ==
- Movses Silikyan (1862–1937), Armenian general
- Agiya Nakhchivanli (1950), Azerbaijani politician
- Stepan Pachikov (1950), Russian software engineer
- Anwar Seyidov (1949–2025), Azerbaijani lawyer

== See also ==
- Ashaghi Mahalla Synagogue
- Yukhari Mahalla Synagogue
