= Oghuz District =

District in northern Azerbaijan

Coordinates: 41°04′15″N 47°27′30″E

- District
- Azerbaijani: Oğuz rayonu
- Map of Azerbaijan showing Oghuz District
- Country: Azerbaijan
- Region: Shaki-Zagatala
- Established: 8 August 1930
- Capital: Oghuz
- Settlements: 34

Government
  - Governor: Javid Abdul-Qadirov

Area
  - Total: 1,080 km^{2} (420 sq mi)

Population (2020)
  - Total: 44,700
  - Density: 41.4/km^{2} (107/sq mi)
- Time zone: UTC+4 (AZT)
- Postal code: 4800
- Website: oguz-ih.gov.az

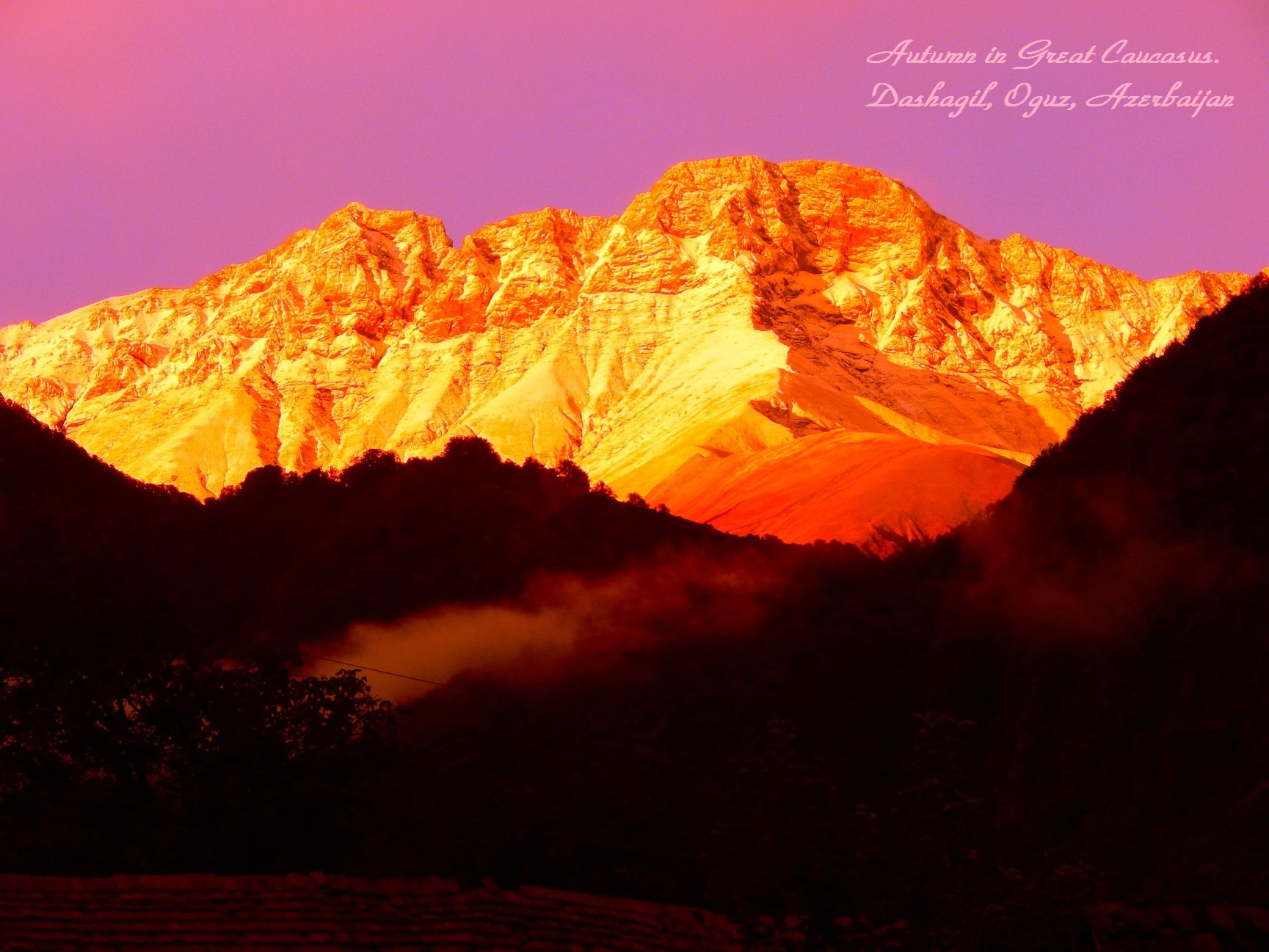
Gysyr dagh in Oghuz

Oghuz District (Azerbaijani: Oğuz rayonu) is one of the 66 districts of Azerbaijan. It is located in the north of the country in the Shaki-Zagatala Economic Region. The district borders the districts of Shaki, Qabala, Agdash, and the Russian Republic of Dagestan. Its capital and largest city is Oghuz. As of 2020, the district had a population of 44,700.

== Location ==
Oghuz District is located on the southern slopes of the Greater Caucasus. The highest point of the region is Malkamud Mount (3879 m). It is the border with the Russian Federation in the north, with Qabala in the east, Shaki in the west, and with Agdash in the south.

== History ==
The remains of a prehistoric man were found near the villages of Kerimli and Garabaghlar, based on the results of archaeological excavations. Stone figurines, various tools, and household items were found here.

The district was part of the Ganja Province, which existed from April 3, 1952, until April 23, 1953. This province was abolished by the decision of the Supreme Soviet of the USSR dated April 23, 1953. Administrative-territorial reforms were carried out in 1962–1964 in connection with the establishment of the agricultural department and the establishment of national economical boards in the territory of the USSR. As a result, industrial and agricultural districts were established on the basis of the large districts. On January 4, 1963, 31 districts and 7 cities were established in the Azerbaijan SSR in the territory of six towns with 50 districts. According to this decision, the city of Nukha (Shaki since 1968) was established and the villages of the district are included in the Vartashen district (which would later become Oghuz District). This reform was cancelled on January 6, 1965, due to inefficiency. For this reason, villages included in the Vartashen district were subordinated to Nukha. Until 1961, Vartashen village was the centre of the Vartashan district. According to the decision of the Supreme Soviet of the Azerbaijan SSR, the name of Vartashan was renamed Oghuz in February 1991.

== Population ==
According to the report of the State Statistics Committee, the total number of population in 2010 was 37,000. In 2018, this indicator increased by 7,000 people.

The population of regions (at the beginning of the year, thsd. persons)
Regions	2000	2001	2002	2003	2004	2005	2006	2007	2008	2009	2010	2011	2012	2013	2014	2015	2016	2017	2018	2019	2020	2021
Oghuz region	37,0	37,3	37,7	38,1	38,4	38,8	39,3	39,6	39,9	40,2	40,5	40,9	41,3	41,7	42,1	42,6	43,1	43,5	44,0	44,3	44,7	45,0
urban population	6,5	6,5	6,5	6,6	6,6	6,7	6,8	6,9	6,9	6,9	6,9	7,0	7,0	7,0	7,1	7,2	7,2	7,3	7,4	7,4	7,5	7,5
rural population	30,5	30,8	31,2	31,5	31,8	32,1	32,5	32,7	33,0	33,3	33,6	33,9	34,3	34,7	35,0	35,4	35,9	36,2	36,6	36,9	37,2	37,5

=== Ethnic groups ===
Ethnic groups in Oghuz (2019)
1. Azerbaijanis (86.8%)
2. Lezgins (10.8%)
3. Others (2.42%)

Ethnic group	According to the 1999 census		According to the 2009 census	
Ethnic group	Number	%	Number	%
Total	36 488	100.00	40 284	100.00
Azerbaijanis	29 735	81.49	34 296	85.14
Lezgins	5 167	14.16	4 831	11.99
Meskhetian Turks	1 021	2.80	805	2.00
Russians	200	0.55	142	0.35
Jews people	179	0.49	85	0.21
Udi people	104	0.29	74	0.18
Kurds	...	...	21	0.05
Tatars	33	0.09	5	0.01
Ukrainians	17	0.05	...	...
Avars	3	0.01	...	...
Others	24	0.07	25	0.06

== Monuments ==
There are 27 clubs including 1 district, 3 rural culture houses, Central Election Committee and its 31 branches, regional History-Ethnography Museum, H.Aliyev museum, children's music school, cultural park in Oghuz district. There are 39 historical and cultural monuments in the region, of which 32 were registered and taken under state protection, as well as included in the list of historical and cultural monuments approved by the decree of the Cabinet of Ministers of the Republic of Azerbaijan on August 2, 2001. 17 of these monuments (of which 15 are archaeological, 2 are sculptural) are of national importance, and 15 (of which 13 are sculptural, 2 are archaeological) are of local importance.
