= Elisæus of Albania =

Saint Elishe of Albania
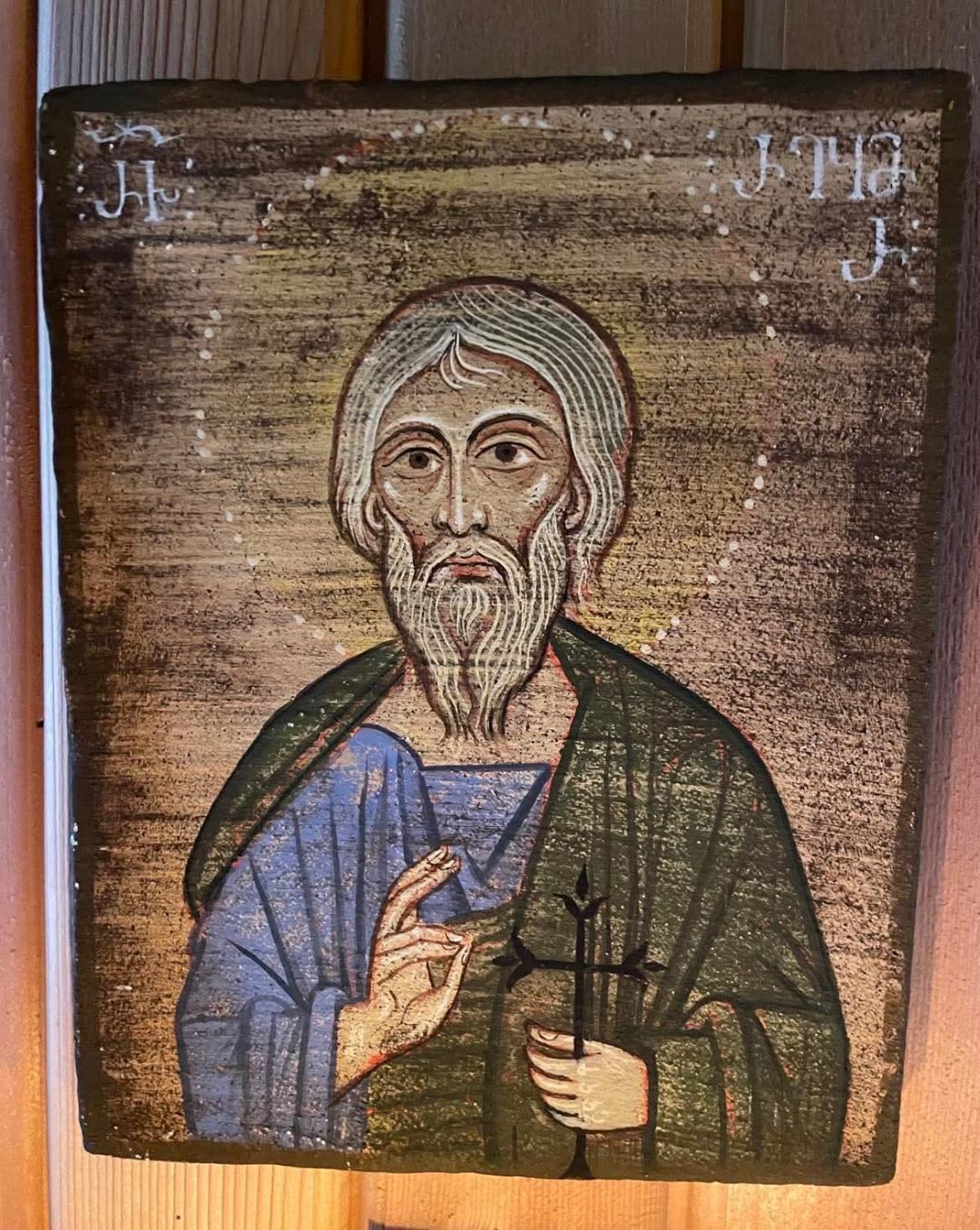

Illuminator, Enlightener
- Born: c. 1st century AD
- Died: 74 or 79 AD; Gelmets, Rutulsky District, Dagestan
- Venerated in: Church of Caucasian Albania Eastern Orthodoxy Oriental Orthodoxy
- Feast: Third Day of Easter (Renewal Tuesday)

Saint Elisæus, Ełišay, Yeghishe, Elishe or Ełišē (Armenian: Եղիշե) was the first patriarch of the Church of Caucasian Albania by local tradition.

== Legend ==
=== Life ===
First attested in the Classical Armenian work The History of the Caucasian Albanians, Elisæus was considered the illuminator of Albania. The legend about Elisæus has two versions. In one version he is presented as one of five disciples of St. Thaddeus (or, of Thaddeus of Edessa, who may have been the same person). According to this version, he returned to Jerusalem after the martyrdom of Thaddeus by Sanatruk and was appointed as head of the church by James the Just. However, another version which was mentioned in context of a debate with the Armenian Catholicos Abraham I (607–615) recounts Elisæus as "disciple of the Lord" without mentioning Thaddeus and referring to James as "patriarch of Jerusalem". The former version records the apostle's journey from Jerusalem to Maskut lands through Persia, reaching Saharn in Utik along with three disciples. Story follows with martyrdom of one disciple, other two deserting him. Legend is continued with Elisæus reaching Kiş, establishing the first mother church of East. Elisæus was later ambushed in Zergoyn plains and his remains was thrown into a pit in Homēnk. Latter version just describes a movement from Jerusalem to Kiş and establishing a church there. Albanians believed that Albania was evangelized 270 years before Armenia.

=== Relics discovery ===
According to The History of the Caucasian Albanians his relics were rediscovered sometime later by 'pious men'. His relics were first transferred to church of Ur̄ekan, then taken to Jrvshtik monastery which later became Yeghishe Arakyal Monastery during reign of Vachagan III.

=== Reinterpretation ===
Some researchers, including Jean-Pierre Mahé and Zaza Aleksidze, consider the latter version to be the original Albanian version of the legend, while earlier one to be gradually Armenized version in order to legitimize the subordination of the Church of Caucasian Albania to the Armenian Apostolic Church. If Elisæus was disciple of Jesus himself and consecrated by James, he would be equal to Thaddeus, thus making the Albanian church of equally apostolic origin. Suggesting that the Elisæus legend was changed under influence of Armenian Church, Mahe and Aleksidze offered that Kiş, Khojavend was founded later to transfer the legend from left bank to Armenian populated Artsakh. Several Armenian authors argued that Elisæus was merely an invention by Albanian monks to get rid of Armenian ecclesiastical dominance. According to Aleksan Hakobyan, the legend was invented by Catholicos of Caucasian Albania, Yeghiazar (683–689) in order to establish his own church independent of the Armenian one.

=== Journey ===
There has been several attempts to identify milestones of Elisæus' trip. Hieromonk Alexy (Nikonorov) suggested to identify Sahar̄n with Zrykh, Zergoyn with Yargun and Homēnk with Gelmets. Zaza Aleksidze identified the latter with Kurmukhi Church, explaining its name as combination of Udi: ḳur, lit. 'rock' and Caucasian Albanian -𐕌𐕒𐕡𐕀 (-mux, plural suffix). Makar Barkhudaryants and H. Arakelyan on the other hand, identified Homēnk with formerly Udi populated village of Bum.

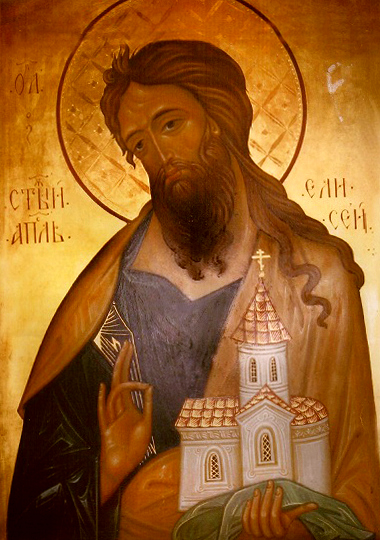
Icon of Eliseus kept in Holy Myrrhbearers Cathedral

== Cult ==
Elisæus' cult had a strong following in Udi-populated regions. In a letter dated to 20 March 1724 sent to Peter I by the Udi people of Shaki, he was identified as illuminator of "Albanian nation". His disciples Vlas the Martyr (considered to be a localized version of St. Blaise) and Komrad were also revered. According to legend, the Church of Saint Elisæus in Nij was built on the tomb of Vlas in 1823. Other churches named after Elisæus were the Church of Kish, Church of Saint Elisæus in Vartashen and St. Eliseus of Khoshkashen (modern Qarabulaq, Oghuz). Elisæus' feast was considered to be on same day as Ascension Thursday, while Komrad's feast was 3 days later. However, in Bum village, it was a week later.

As opposed to the left bank of the Kura River, the cult of Elisæus was not as widespread in Karabakh. On the right bank, only two Christian holy sites bear his name: Yeghishe Arakyal Monastery and Yeghishe Arakel monastery of Gishi. According to one view, the name for the former is a folk etymology and the monastery in fact is named after a young brave man named Yeghish, who was martyred by a local tyrant while fighting for the honor of his wife.

== Icon ==
Although not canonically accepted as a saint in church traditions, Elisæus has two modern icons kept in Azerbaijan and Georgia. Azerbaijani icon was made in 2010s in Russian style and is being displayed in Holy Myrrhbearers Cathedral. Second one was produced in Zinobiani, a Udi-populated village in Georgia in 2024. The inscription uses Caucasian Albanian script, however uses modern Udi language to transliterate the name.

== Sources ==
- Barkhudaryants, Makar (1893). Aghuanitsʻ erkir ew dratsʻikʻ Աղուանից երկիր եւ դրացիք [The land of Albania and its neighbors] (in Armenian). Tiflis: M. Sharadze.
