= Udi people =

Ethnic group native to the Caucasus

Udi
Udi
- The Udi Flag

Total population
- c. 10,000

Regions with significant populations
- Azerbaijan: 4,100
- Russia: 2,551 (2021)
- Ukraine: 592
- Armenia: 202
- Georgia: 174

Languages
- Udi, Azerbaijani, Ukrainian, and Russian

Religion
- Albanian-Udi Church, Eastern Orthodox Christianity

Related ethnic groups
- Other Northeast Caucasian-speaking peoples, especially Aghuls, Lezgins, and Tabasarans

The Udi (or Uti) are a Lezgic people group native to the Caucasus that live mainly in Russia and Azerbaijan, with smaller populations in Georgia, Armenia, Kazakhstan, Ukraine, and other countries. Their total number is about 10,000 people. They speak the Udi language, which belongs to the Northeast Caucasian language family. Some also speak Azerbaijani, Russian, Georgian, or Armenian, depending on where they reside. Their religion is Christianity.

== History ==
The Udi are considered to be one of the 26 tribes of the Caucasian Albania of late antiquity. According to the classical authors, the Udi inhabited the area of the eastern Caucasus along the coast of the Caspian Sea, in a territory extending to the Kura River in the north. There was also a province of the Kingdom of Armenia, Utikʻ (later annexed by Caucasian Albania), which likely bore the name of the ancestors of the Udi.

Since the 5th century, the Udi are often mentioned in the Armenian sources. More extensive information is given in The History of the Land of Ałuank by Movsēs Kałankatuatsʻi. The Udi were one of the predominating Caucasian Albanian tribes.

Due to their Caucasian Udi language and their Christian faith, the Udi are regarded as the last remnants of the old Caucasian Albanians. Under Arab and later Persian rule, some of them converted to Islam, and soon adopted the Azeri language. Others assimilated into the Georgians or Armenians.

On 31 March 1724, an Udi community from Shaki wrote a petition in Armenian to Peter the Great asking for his protection, which reads: "We are Albanians, and Udis [as regards our] stock. Through the preaching of the apostle Elisaeus, our ancestors became believers in God." Here, the Armenian word աղուվանք aghuvank’ is used for 'Albanians' and ուտիք utik’ for 'Udis'. Thus, the authors indicate that they view themselves, the Udis, as a subset of Albanians and connect themselves with the neighboring historical Armenian province of Utik.

Whereas the Udi of Vartashen have remained in the Armenian Apostolic (or Gregorian) Church and used to conduct services in Armenian, the Udi of Nij changed from the Armenian to the Eastern Orthodox Church soon after the beginning of Russian rule. The Armenian Apostolic Church held services exclusively in the Armenian language and refused to ordain a local Udi priest, against which Udis protested:

...our strong desire is that our pastor be a representative of our people, for although we belong to the Church of St. Gregory the Enlightener, our language is different: we are the Uti and we know that these people live nowhere except for the villages of Nizh and Vardashen. We do not have the slightest command of the Armenian language; nor have we any idea about what the Gospel says...

In 2003, the Albanian-Udi Christian Religious Community was founded in Azerbaijan, which seeks to restore the Albanian Apostolic Church as a church independent from the Armenian Apostolic Church.

Centuries of life in the Armenian, Iranian, and Turkish spheres influenced their culture, as is expressed in Udi folk traditions and their material culture.

== Udi villages ==
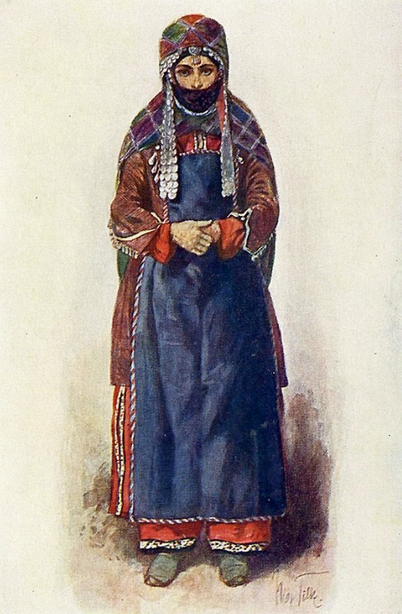
Udi woman as depicted by Max Karl Tilke

Until 1991, the main Udi villages were Vartashen (now Oğuz) and Nij in Azerbaijan, as well as the village of Zinobiani in Georgia. Today the only places of concentrated Udi settlement are Nij and Zinobiani, which was founded by Udi refugees from Vartashen in the 1920s. In the recent past, Udi people also lived in Mirzabeily, Soltan Nuha, Jourlu, Mihlikuvah, Vardanli (now Karimli), Bajan, Kirzan, and Yenikend. In contemporary times they have mostly assimilated with the people of Azerbaijan.

Vartashen was mainly a Udi village, where the Vartashen dialect of the Udi language was spoken by about 3000 people in the 1980s. The Udi of Vartashen belonged to the Armenian Apostolic Church and had Armenian surnames. During the Nagorno-Karabakh conflict, the Udi as well as the Armenians were expelled to Armenia. Some 50 Udi people remained among some 7000 ethnic Azeris in the town, which was renamed to Oghuz.

Small groups reside in Russia in the Rostov region (Shahty, Taganrog, Rostov-na-Donu, Azov, Aleksandrovka); in the Krasnodar territory (Krasnodar, areas of Dinskoy, Leningrad, Kushchevsky); in the Stavropol Territory (Minvody, Pyatigorsk); in the Volgograd region (Volgograd, Dubovy Ovrag); and also in Sverdlovsk, Ivanovo, Kaluga areas, Moscow, Saint Petersburg, Astrakhan; in Georgia in the outskirts of Tbilisi, Poti, Rustavi, in Armenia mainly in the Lori Province, and Aktau in Kazakhstan. Some also live in Ukraine's Kharkiv oblast.

== Language ==
The Udi language is a Northeast Caucasian language of the Lezgic branch. The two primary dialects are Nij (Nidzh) and Vartashen. The people today also speak Azerbaijani, Russian, and Georgian. The Udi are commonly bilingual, and less frequently trilingual, depending on residence and work. Many use Udi only in daily life, but for official purposes, the Udi use the language of the country in which they reside, such as Azerbaijani, Russian, or Armenian.

=== Dialects ===
The Udi language has two dialects: Nidzh and Vartashen. Nidzh dialect has sub-dialects that are divided into three subgroups - bottom, intermediate, top. Linguists believe the dialects originated according to geographic groupings of the Udi from the Tauz region: the villages of Kirzan and Artzah (Karabah, v. Seysylla, Gasankala) moved to Nidzh and Oguz. The Vartashen dialect has two sub-dialects: Vartashen and Oktomberry.

=== History ===
In the past the Udi language was one of the widespread languages of Caucasian Albania, on the basis of which in the 5th century the Caucasian Albanian script was created by the Armenian monk Mesrop Mashtots. The alphabet had 52 letters. The language was widely used, as major Bible texts were translated into the Caucasian Albanian language. Church services were conducted in it. After the fall of the Caucasian Albanian state, the Caucasian Albanian liturgical language was gradually replaced by Armenian in church.

== Population and changes ==
In 1880, the population of the Udi people living in the area around Qabala in northern Azerbaijan was estimated at 10,000. In the year 1897, the number of the Udi people was given around 4,000, in 1910, it was around 5,900. They were counted as 2,500 in the census of 1926, as 3,700 in 1959, as 7,000 in 1979, and in 1989, the Udi people numbered 8,652. In census of 1999 in Azerbaijan, there were 4,152 Udi.

In the 2002 Russia Census, 3,721 residents identified as Udi. Most of the Udi people (1,573 persons) in Russia have been registered in Rostov region.

== Notable Udi people ==
- Stepan Pachikov, software company founder.
- George Kechaari, Udi writer.
- Voroshil Gukasyan, Soviet – Azerbaijan linguist.
- Movses Silikyan, major general.
- Zinobi Silikashvili, founder of Udi village of Zinobiani

== See also ==
- Caucasian Albania
- Romans in Caucasian Albania
- Ingiloy people
