= Bulun Church =

- Ĭvĕl Mariyami Nanay Bulun Gergeś
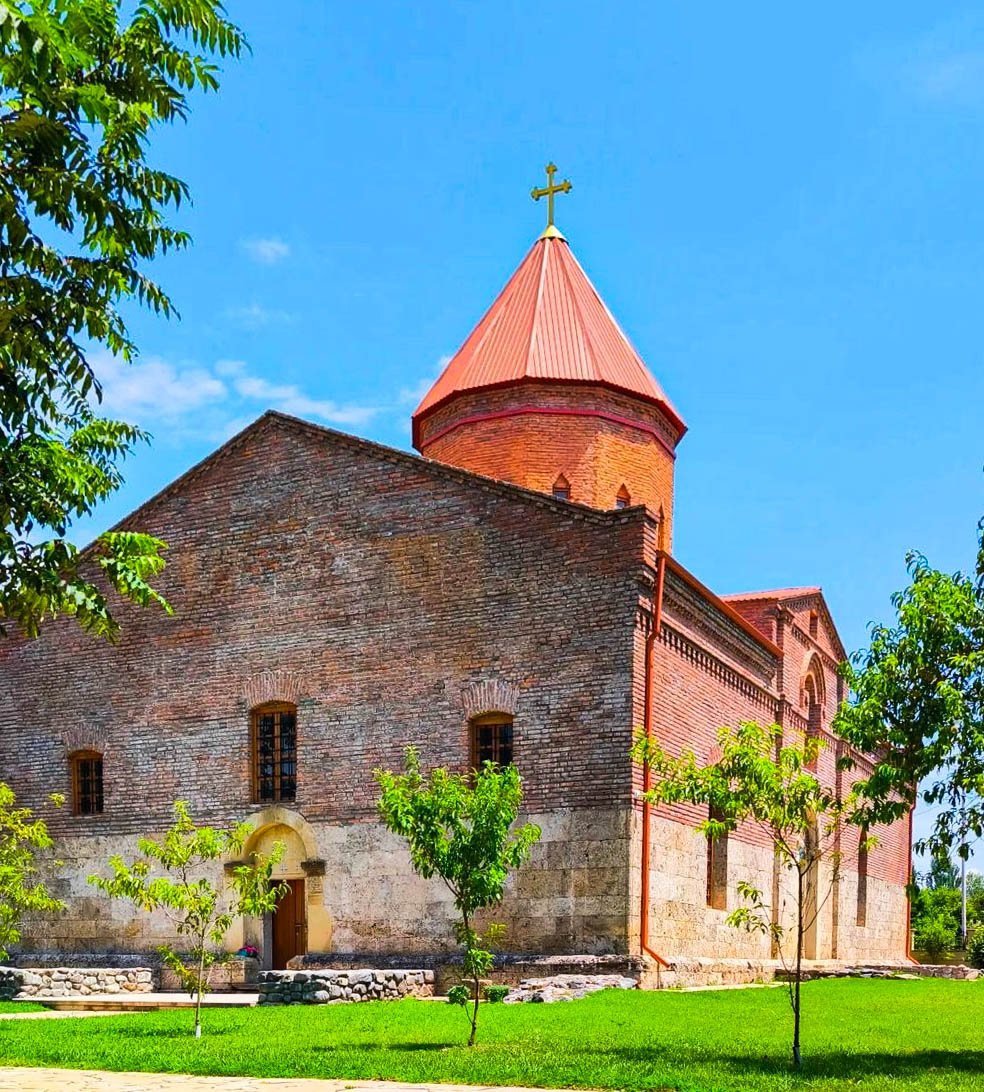

- 40°56′23″N 47°39′50″E
- Country: Azerbaijan
- Previous denomination: Armenian Apostolic Church

History
- Former name: Church of the Mother of God
- Dedication: St. Mary
- Consecrated: 1892

Architecture
- Functional status: Renovated
- Groundbreaking: 1890
- Completed: 1892

Specifications
- Length: 25.73 m
- Width: 13.74 m

The Church of Blessed Virgin Mary of Bulun (Udi: Ĭvĕl Mariyami Nanay Bulun Gergeś) or simply Bulun Church is a 19th-century church in Nij, Azerbaijan. Located in the upper (Armenian: Վերին, romanized: verin, Udi: bulun, lit. 'upper') quarter of the village, locals call it Bulun Church to distinguish it from the Tsilin Church in the lower (Armenian: Ներքին, romanized: nerkin, Udi: s'ilin, lit. 'lower') quarter of the village. It was founded as an Armenian church and named Church of the Mother of God (Armenian: Սուրբ Աստվածածին եկեղեցի, lit. 'Surp Astvatsatsin yekeghets'i').

== History ==
The largest and only domed church in the village, it was founded in 1890. The building measures 25.73 by 13.74 meters. Constructed of bricks, it features two entrances on the western and southern facades, an octahedral drum, and double-storied vestries, according to historian Samvel Karapetyan. It was probably finished in 1892. Repair work was planned for in 1917, but was not commenced. It was appropriated by the Soviet authorities on 30 December 1928 and was used as a warehouse.

== Current use ==
It was renovated by the Heydar Aliyev Foundation in 2020 and opened to the public. Some elements were added and removed during the renovation process. One of the additions was a separate bell tower next to the church. An inscription on the entrance was visible until 2020 but was covered during the renovation process.

Although officially not a part of any established church, by agreement with the leadership of the Udi community, clergy of the Baku Eparchy celebrate the Divine Liturgy several times a year in the church.

Before 2020	After 2020	Original text	Translation
		N/A	N/A
		Ի 1890 Թ(ՎԻ)Ն ՍԿՍՈՒԵՑ ԱՅՍ ՆԻԺ ԳԻՒՂԻ ՎԵՐԻՆ ԹԱՂԻՍԱ(ՍՏՈՒԱ)ԾԱԾԻՆ ԵԿԵՂԵՑՒՈՑ ՇԻՆՈՒԹԻՒՆԸ ԱՍԱՐԱԿՈՒԹՅԱՆ ԾԱԽՔՈՎ ԱՒ(ԱՐ)Տ 189. Թ.	In the year 1890 the construction of Surp Astvatzatzin Church of Nij Village commenced with the local people's means. 189-
