= Quşlar =

Quşlar or Kushlar may refer to:

- Quşlar, Kurdamir, Azerbaijan
- Quşlar, Qabala, Azerbaijan
