= Georgy Kechaari =

Azerbaijani writer and scientist

- Native name: Jora Avetisiğar Keçaari
- Born: 25 July 1930; Nij, Azerbaijan SSR
- Died: 8 September 2006; Nij, Azerbaijan
- Occupation: philologist, writer, translator, educator
- Education: Baku State University

Georgy Avetisovich Kechaari (Udi: Jora Avetisiğar Keçaari; Azerbaijani: Georgi Avetis oğlu Keçaari; Russian: Георгий Аветисович Кечаари; 25 July 1930 – 8 September 2006) was an Udi writer and educator.

== Life ==
He was born in the settlement of Nic, in the Qəbələ Rayon of the Azerbaijan in 1930. In 1946, he went to Baku to pursue Oriental studies at the Baku State University. After finishing his studies in 1952, he returned to his native village and worked as a school teacher. Throughout his life, along with teaching, he regularly was engaged in creative outlets. Kechaari developed a primer and a program to teach the Udi language to school children. He published a number of original works and translated works into Udi. Moreover, he authored many other articles and books devoted to the Udi people. Kechaari headed Orayin, an Udi cultural-educational society, for many years. He died in 2006 and was buried in Nic.

== Works ==
- Nana Oččal (lit. "native earth") — a collection of writings in Udi by various authors on the Udi language
- Orayin ("Spring") — a collection of Udi folklore (a fairy tale, a legend, a proverb, and jokes) as well as the author's own writings in Udi
- Buruxmux ("Mountains") — the author's writings and translation of more than 150 representatives of Azerbaijani literary works
- Ocaq başında rəqs ("Dance at a fire") — a collection of Udi folklore in the Azerbaijani language
- Udinlərdə ənənəvi toy mərasimləri ("Traditional Udi wedding ceremonies") — also in Azerbaijani
- Shnurok (Шнурок, "Lace") — a collection of short Udi anecdotes and stories in Russian
