= Şamlı =

Şamlı may refer to:

- Şamlı, Qabala, Azerbaijan
- Şamlı, Zangilan, Azerbaijan
