= Church of Saint Elisæus (Nij) =

Former Armenian church in Azerbaijan

Church of Saint Elisæus / Yeghishe
- Udi: Ĭvĕl Yeliseyi s'iyen C'otari Gergeś
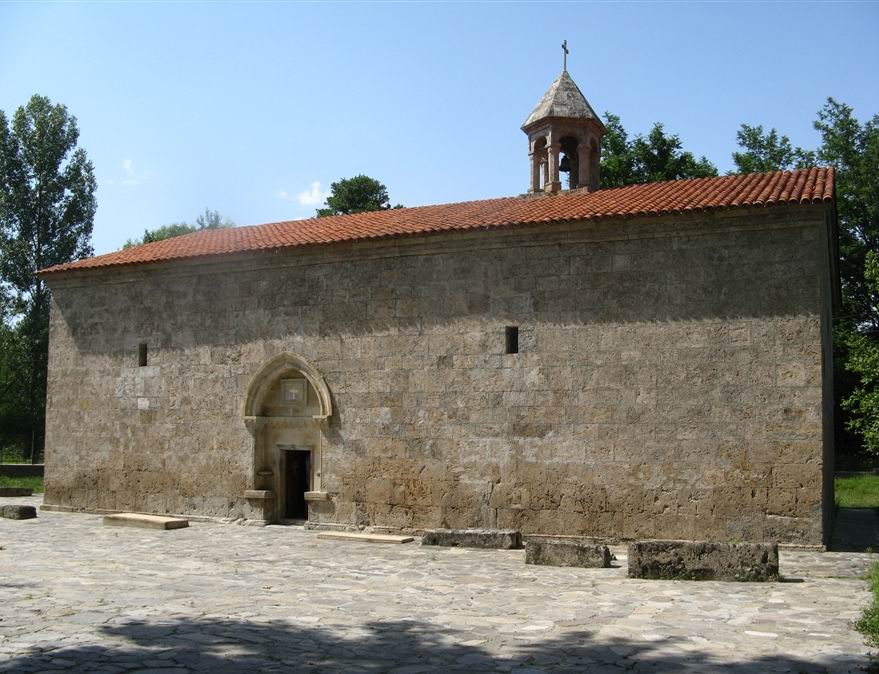
- Exterior of the church

- Location within Azerbaijan

Religion
- Affiliation: Albanian-Udi religious community of Azerbaijan, formerly Armenian Apostolic Church
- Region: Qabala

Location
- Location: Nij, Azerbaijan
- Coordinates: 40°56′42″N 47°40′09″E

Architecture
- Completed: 1823

Specifications
- Length: 18.14
- Width: 11.17

Saint Elisæus Church (Azerbaijani: Müqəddəs Yelisey kilsəsi, Udi: Ĭvĕl Yeliseyi s'iyen C'otari Gergeś, Armenian: Սուրբ Եղիշե եկեղեցի) or Jotaari Church (Azerbaijani: Cotaari məbədi, after the quarter) is a former Armenian church, now used by Albanian-Udi religious community of Azerbaijan, located on the municipality of Nij in the Qabala region of Azerbaijan.

== History ==
The church was built in 1823 by a local priest Yengibar Yordanianc Ter-Astvacatowr on the gravesite and prior chapel of Vlas the Martyr, a disciple of Saint Elysaeus. It was repaired in 1879 by locals.

== Controversy ==
It was repaired again in 2004 as part of a project financed by Norwegian Humanitarian Enterprise. The destruction during that renovation of Armenian inscriptions associated with the church prompted a protest by Norway's ambassador to Azerbaijan, Steinar Gil, who refused to attend the reopening of the monument and compared the erasing to the destruction of the Buddhas of Bamyan. The Norwegian Embassy in Baku described the destruction as an "act of vandalism". Three inscriptions on the walls of the church were destroyed, including two on the lintel and tympanum of the south entrance; Armenian inscriptions on the gravestones that surrounded the church were also erased. The destruction of the inscriptions, together with Azerbaijan's labeling of the church as "Albanian" and its denial that the church had an Armenian identity, has been described as being part of a wider "cultural genocide against Armenian monuments in Azerbaijan".

In May 2018, in a report submitted to the UN General Assembly by the Permanent Mission of Armenia to the United Nations, the erasing of the Armenian inscriptions at Nij was cited as evidence that "all restoration work of Christian architectural monuments in Azerbaijan was carried out in such a way as to destroy the traces of Armenian architecture, as well as the Armenian inscriptions".

== Priests ==
The National Archives of Armenia holds several documents pertaining to the priests who once served in church:

- From 1832 until at least 1857 – Avetik Ohanjanian Jotaniants. He was grandson of founder Yengibar Astvatzatur Jotaniants and grave is near southern wall of the church.
- 1859–1885 – Hovhannes Ter-Astvatzatrian Jotaniants
- 1879– 27 December 1910 – Hambardzum (Hovhannes) Avagian Dallakiants
