= Tsilin Church =

- Ĭvĕl Yeliseyi s'iyen S'ilin Gergeś
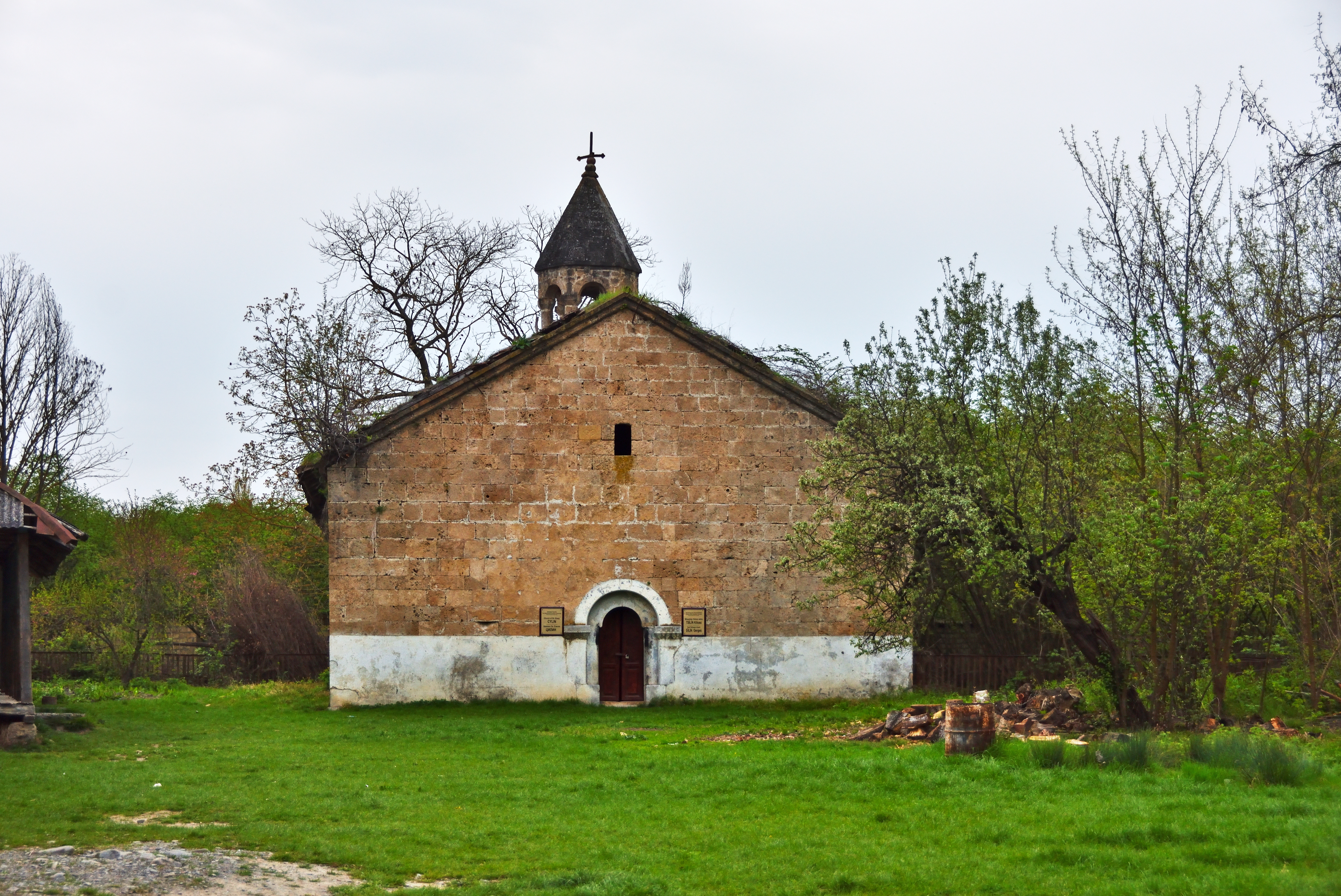

- 40°55′13″N 47°39′16″E
- Country: Azerbaijan
- Previous denomination: Armenian Apostolic Church

History
- Former name: Church of the Mother of God
- Founder: Galust Yuzbashi
- Earlier dedication: St. Mary
- Consecrated: 1870

Architecture
- Functional status: Preserved
- Groundbreaking: 1866
- Completed: 1869

Specifications
- Length: 20.52 m
- Width: 11.56 m

St. Elisaeus Tsilin Church (Udi: Ĭvĕl Yeliseyi s'iyen S'ilin Gergeś) is a 19th-century church in Nij, Azerbaijan. Locals call it simply Tsilin Church to distinguish the church located in the lower (Armenian: Ներքին, romanized: nerkin, Udi: s'ilin, lit. 'lower') quarter of the village from the St. Mary the Mother Church in the upper (Armenian: Վերին, romanized: verin, Udi: bulun, lit. 'upper') quarter of the village. It was founded as an Armenian church and named Church of the Mother of God (Armenian: Սուրբ Աստվածածին եկեղեցի, lit. 'Surp Astvatsatsin yekeghets'i').

== History ==
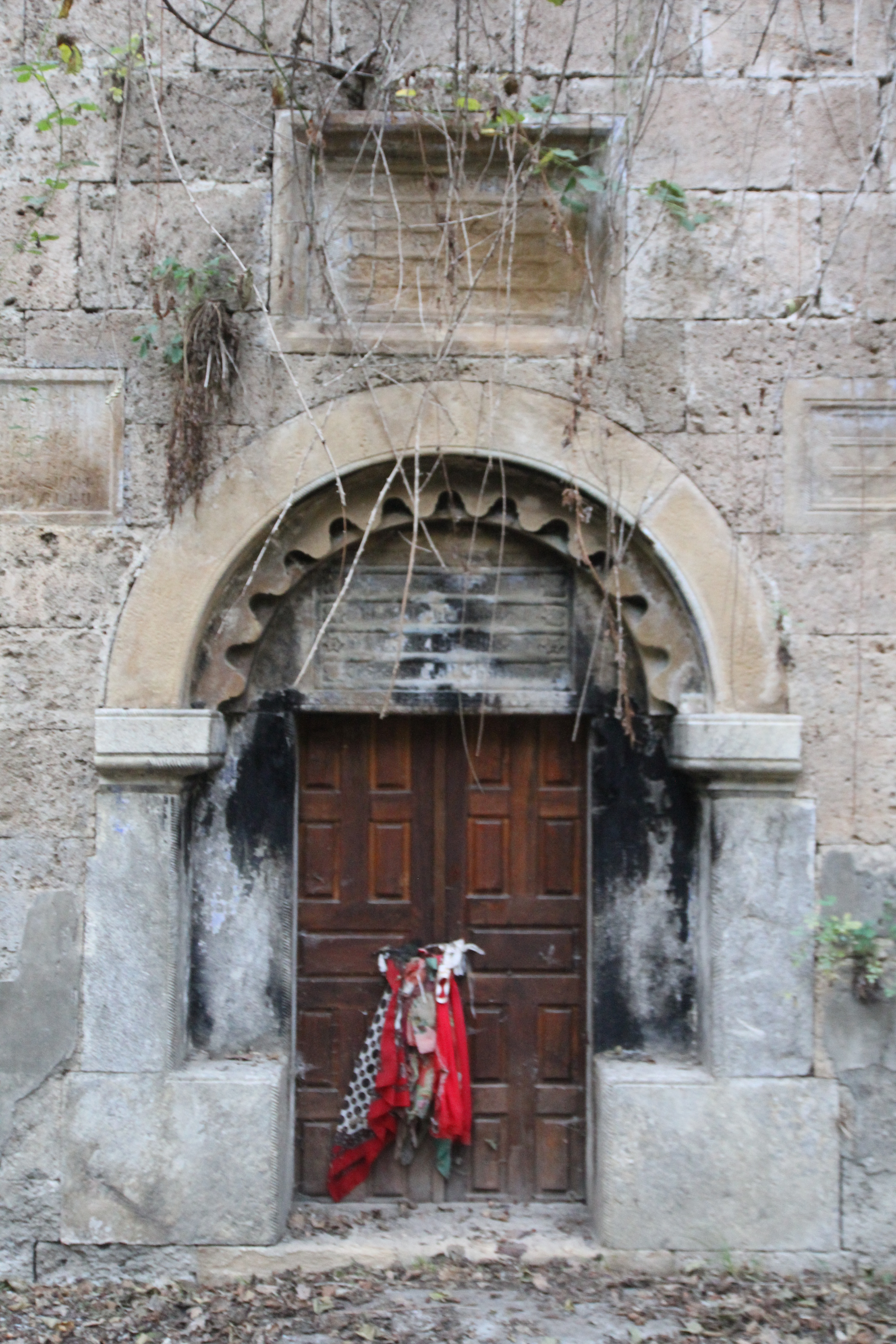
Entrance of the church

The foundation of the current church was laid in 1866, and the construction was completed in 1869. The church was consecrated that year by priest Aristakes and opened for use. The names of ethnic Udi donors Galust Yuzbashi and Khachatur Yeghiazaryan are mentioned among those who provided financial assistance to the construction.

== Architecture ==
According to Samvel Karapetyan, the church, featuring double-storied vestries and semi-circular vaults, shares several architectural traits with Church of Saint Elisæus. The vault is supported by two pairs of cruciform columns, and it has an additional window on the northern facade compared to the latter. In the lower part of the plaster, several frescoes depicting God the Father, the four Evangelists (only two remains now), Binding of Isaac and more have survived. The church, which has a sundial on its southern facade, is constructed entirely of finely finished stone and mortar. Its belfry, culminating in a pointed hexahedral broach supported by six columns, stands atop the western pediment.

== School ==
Nij secondary school No.5 is located in the courtyard of the church. School was founded in 1875 under the name St. Mesrop.

== Inscriptions ==
Church inscriptions were attested by Samvel Karapetyan 1984–1987 and were surviving in 2021:

Photo (2021)	Original	Translation by Samvel Karapetyan
	ՌՍՏԱԿԵՍԵԱՆՑ ՅԻՇԱՏԱԿ ԿԵ ՆԴԱՆԵԱՑ ԵԻ ՆՆՋԵՑԵԼՈՑ ԻՒՐԵԱՆՑ ՀԻՄՆԵՑԱՒ Ի ԹՎԻՆ ՀԱՅՈՑ ՌՅԺԵ, ԱԻԱՐՏԵՑԱՒ ՌՅԺԸ	In memory of those dead and alive from the Rstakessiants' family, it was founded in the year 1315 (1866 according to the Gregorian calendar) and completed in 1318 (1869).
	ԵՂԻԱԶԱՐԵԱՆ ԽԱՉԱՏՈՒՐ ԻՇԽԱՆՆ ՈՒՏԻ ՑԵՐԿԱՆՑ ԻՒՐ Ի ՇԻՆՈՒԹԻ(Ւ)Ն ՏԱՃԱՐԻՍ ԵՏ ՀԻՆԳ ՀԱՐԻՒՐ ՌՈՒԲԼԻՍ	Udi ishkhan Khachatur Yeghiazarian donated five hundred rubles to construct the church.
	ԿԱՌՈՒՑԱՒ ՍԲ ԵԿԵՂԵՑԻՍ ԱԾ ԱՐԴԵԱՄԲՔ ՆԻԺԵՑԻ ԳԱ ԼՈՒՍՏ, ԽԱՉԱՏՈՒՐ, ՅԱՐՈՒԹԻ ՒՆ ԵՒ ՀԱՄԲԱՐՁՈՒՄ, ՉՈՐ ԻՑ ՀԱՐԱԶԱՏ ԵՂԲԱՐՑ, ՌՊՀ	Church of the Mother of God was built in 1870 with the means of Galust, Khachatur, Harutiun and Hambardzum, four brothers from Nizh.

== Frescoes ==
Church frescoes were attested by Samvel Karapetyan 1984–1987 and were surviving in 2021:

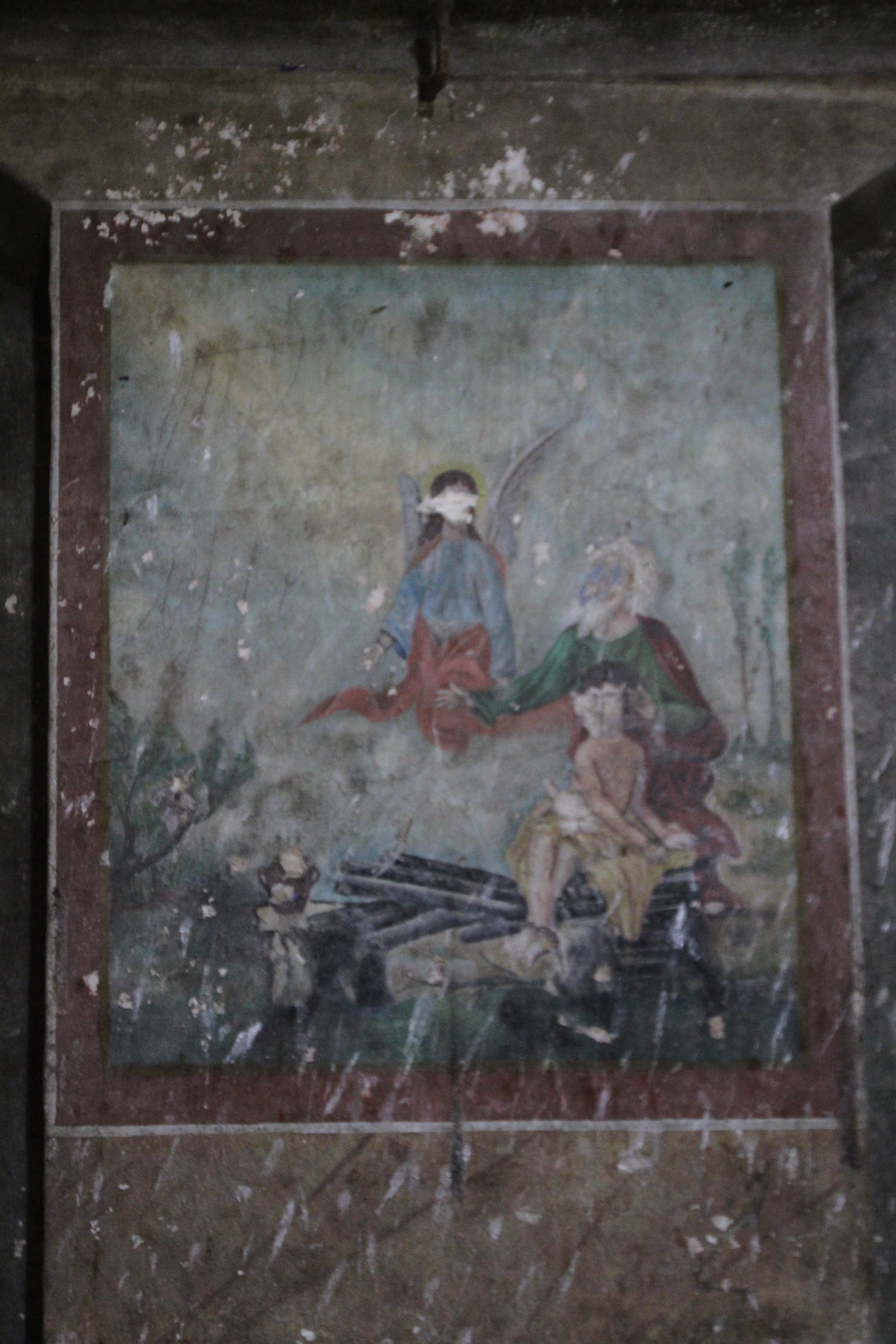
Binding of Isaac

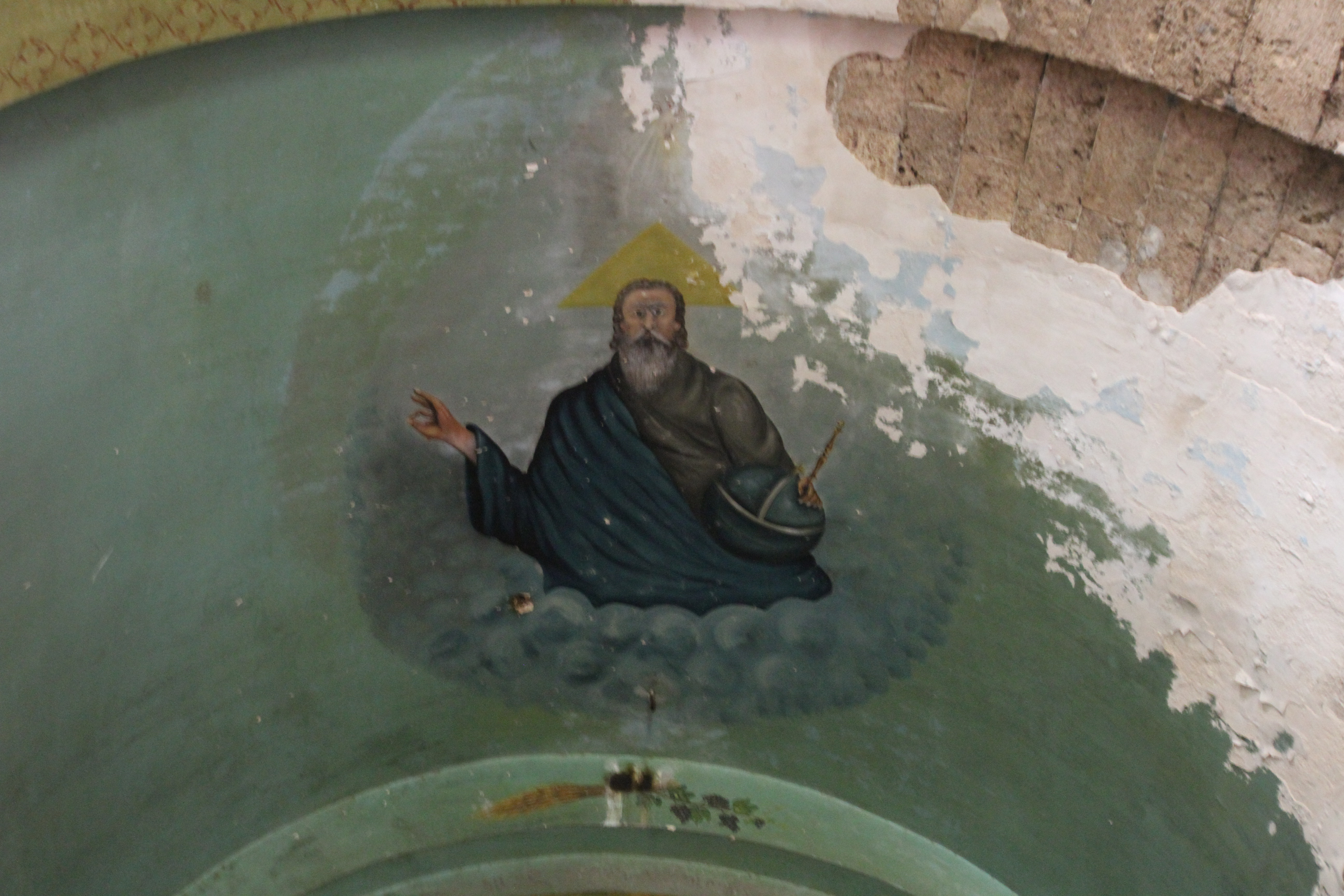
God the Father with Globus cruciger, Dextera Dei and triangular halo symbolizing the Trinity.

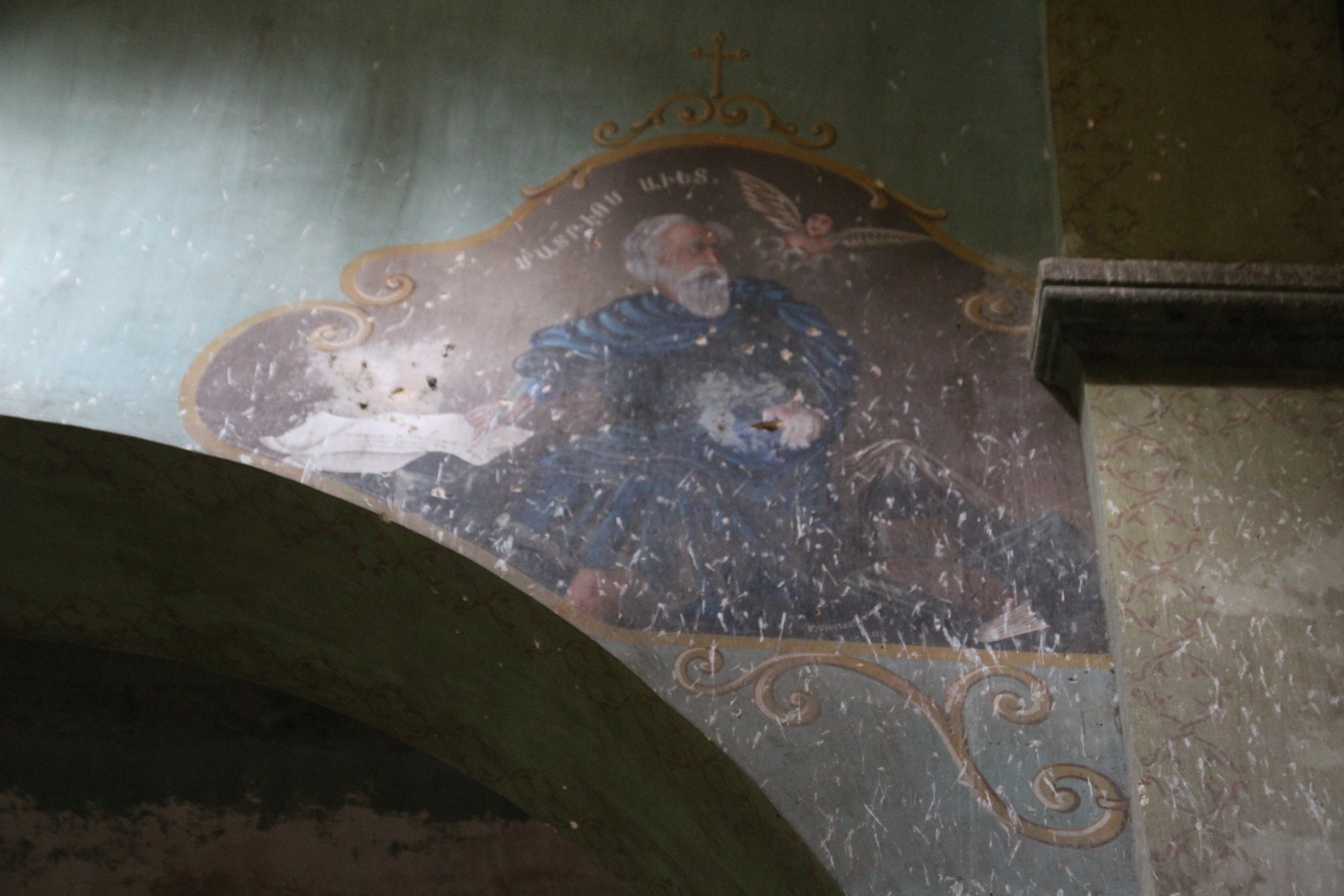
Fresco of Matthew the Apostle

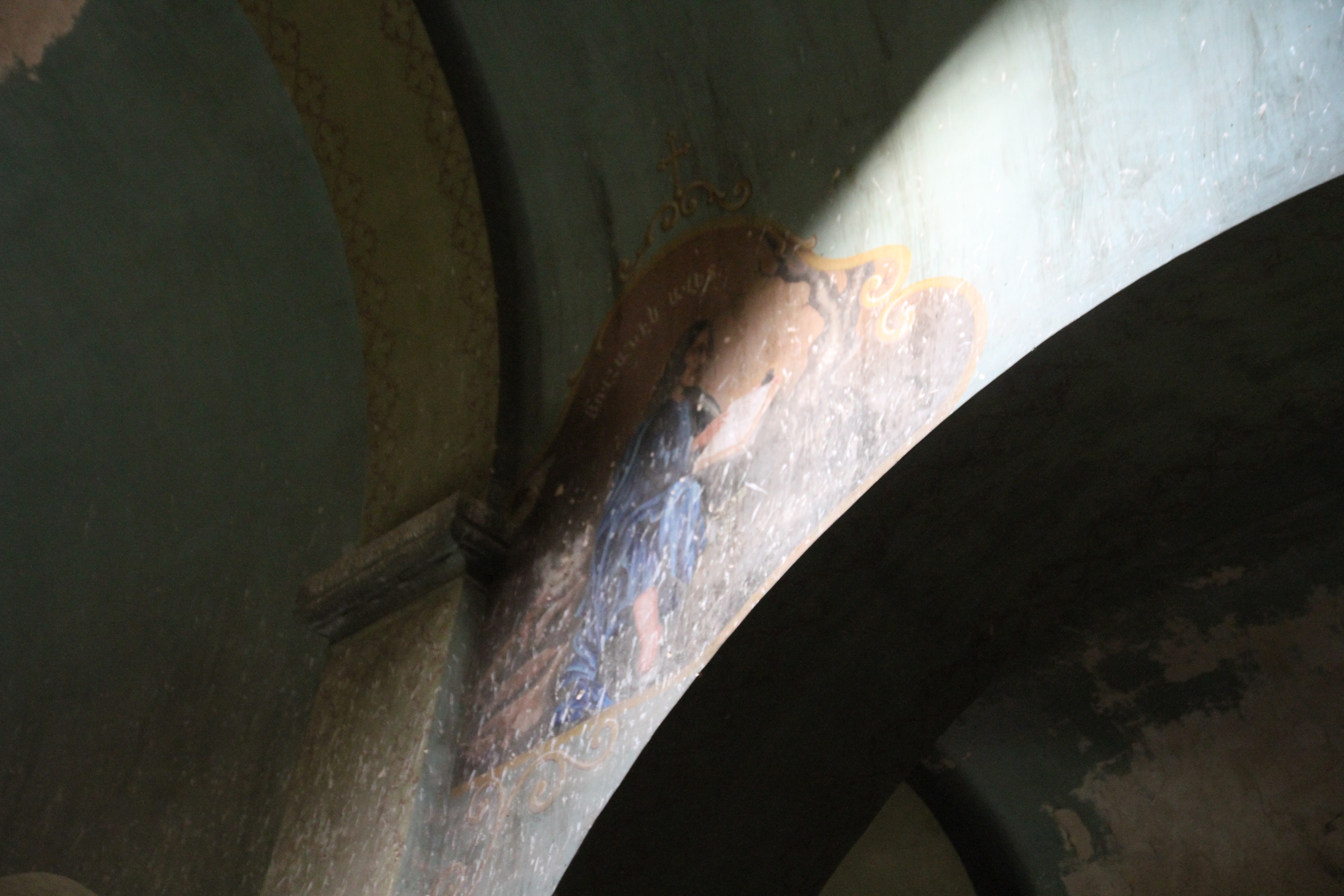
Fresco of John the Apostle
