= Şəfili =

- Municipality
- Location within Azerbaijan Location within Shaki-Zagatala Economic Region
- Coordinates: 40°50′N 47°41′E
- Country: Azerbaijan
- Rayon: Qabala

Population
  - Total: 198
- Time zone: UTC+4 (AZT)
  - Summer (DST): UTC+5 (AZT)

Şəfili (also, Shafili and Shafily) is a village and the least populous municipality in the Qabala Rayon of Azerbaijan. It has a population of 198.
