= Daşca =

- Municipality
- Location within Azerbaijan Location within Shaki-Zagatala Economic Region
- Coordinates: 40°56′50″N 47°47′47″E
- Country: Azerbaijan
- Rayon: Qabala

Population
  - Total: 747
- Time zone: UTC+4 (AZT)
  - Summer (DST): UTC+5 (AZT)

Daşca (also, Dashdzha, Dashtydzha, and Tash-diza) is a village and municipality in the Qabala Rayon of Azerbaijan. It has a population of 747.
