= Dandıx =

- Location within Azerbaijan Location within Shaki-Zagatala Economic Region
- Coordinates: 41°00′43″N 47°43′45″E
- Country: Azerbaijan
- Rayon: Qabala
- Municipality: Tikanlı
- Time zone: UTC+4 (AZT)
  - Summer (DST): UTC+5 (AZT)

Dandıx (also, Dandykh and Dandıq) is a village in the Qabala Rayon of Azerbaijan. The village forms part of the municipality of Tikanlı.
