= Məmmədağalı =

- Municipality
- Location within Azerbaijan Location within Shaki-Zagatala Economic Region
- Coordinates: 40°51′56″N 47°58′16″E
- Country: Azerbaijan
- Rayon: Qabala

Population
  - Total: 415
- Time zone: UTC+4 (AZT)
  - Summer (DST): UTC+5 (AZT)

Məmmədağalı (also, Mamedagaly) is a village and municipality in the Qabala Rayon of Azerbaijan. It has a population of 415.
