= Abrıx =

- Municipality
- Location within Azerbaijan Location within Shaki-Zagatala Economic Region
- Coordinates: 41°02′21″N 47°44′16″E
- Country: Azerbaijan
- Rayon: Qabala

Population
  - Total: 620
- Time zone: UTC+4 (AZT)
  - Summer (DST): UTC+5 (AZT)

Abrıx is a village and municipality in the Qabala Rayon of Azerbaijan. It has a population of 620.
