= Seyidqışlaq =

- Municipality
- Location within Azerbaijan Location within Shaki-Zagatala Economic Region
- Coordinates: 40°55′09″N 47°55′38″E
- Country: Azerbaijan
- Rayon: Qabala

Population
  - Total: 488
- Time zone: UTC+4 (AZT)
  - Summer (DST): UTC+5 (AZT)
- Climate: Cfa

Seyidqışlaq (also, Seidkyshlak, Seydkyshlag, and Seydkyshlak) is a village and municipality in the Qabala Rayon of Azerbaijan. It has a population of 488.
