= Xırxatala =

- Municipality
- Location within Azerbaijan
- Coordinates: 40°57′56″N 47°45′20″E
- Country: Azerbaijan
- District: Qabala

Population
  - Total: 1,392
- Time zone: UTC+4 (AZT)

Xırxatala Khirkhtala) is a village and municipality in the Qabala District of Azerbaijan. It has a population of 1,392.
