= İmamlı =

- Municipality
- Location within Azerbaijan Location within Shaki-Zagatala Economic Region
- Coordinates: 40°56′34″N 47°44′32″E
- Country: Azerbaijan
- Rayon: Qabala

Population
  - Total: 373
- Time zone: UTC+4 (AZT)

İmamlı (also, Imamly) is a village and municipality in the Qabala Rayon of Azerbaijan. It has a population of 373.
