= Qarasu, Qabala =

Coordinates: 40.7333°N 72.8833°E

Qarasu is a village in the municipality of Bum in the Qabala Rayon of Azerbaijan.
