= Uludaş =

- Municipality
- Location within Azerbaijan Location within Shaki-Zagatala Economic Region
- Coordinates: 40°59′N 47°45′E
- Country: Azerbaijan
- Rayon: Qabala

Population
  - Total: 1,501
- Time zone: UTC+4 (AZT)
  - Summer (DST): UTC+5 (AZT)

Uludaş (also, Uludash) is a village and municipality in the Qabala Rayon of Azerbaijan. It has a population of 1,501.
