= Voroshil Gukasyan =

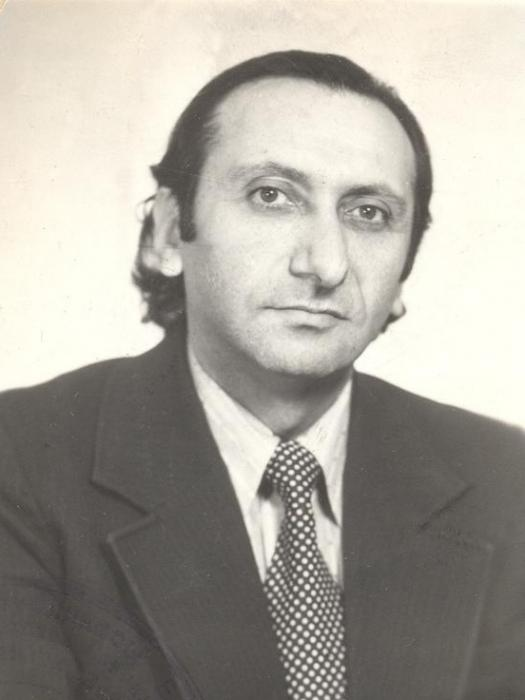
Voroshil Gukasyan

Voroshil Levonovich Gukasyan (1932–1986) was a Soviet linguist, caucasologist and specialist in Udi language and Caucasian Albanian inscriptions. He was born in the village Nij, Azerbaijan and was Udi by ethnicity.

He worked at the Academy of Sciences of Azerbaijan SSR. In 1965 he defended his thesis on the phonetic and morphological features of the Udi "Nij" dialect.

His thesis defense was held at the Philological Faculty of Tbilisi State University. The head of the research project was Jeyranishvili (Udi from Zinobiani). In 1973 Gukasyan became a Doctor of Philology, defended at the Institute of Linguistics of the Azerbaijan SSR Academy of Sciences study on "The relationship of Azeri and Udi languages".

Of particular note is his release in 1974 of the Udi-Azerbaijani-Russian Dictionary, which remains today the only large body of vocabulary of both modern Udi languages, Nij and Vartashen dialects. He is also author of many articles on Udi language.

Many of his works are signed "G.Voroshil".

He is buried in the village of Nij, Azerbaijan.
