= Bılıx =

- Municipality
- Location within Azerbaijan Location within Shaki-Zagatala Economic Region
- Coordinates: 40°49′23″N 47°50′47″E
- Country: Azerbaijan
- Rayon: Qabala

Population
  - Total: 862
- Time zone: UTC+4 (AZT)
  - Summer (DST): UTC+5 (AZT)

Bılıx (also, Bilykh, Blykh, and Bylykh) is a village and municipality in the Qabala Rayon of Azerbaijan. It has a population of 862.
