= Tikanlı =

- Municipality
- Location within Azerbaijan Location within Shaki-Zagatala Economic Region
- Coordinates: 41°01′22″N 47°45′11″E
- Country: Azerbaijan
- Rayon: Qabala

Population
  - Total: 1,850
- Time zone: UTC+4 (AZT)
  - Summer (DST): UTC+5 (AZT)

Tikanlı (also, Tikanly and Tikyanly) is a village and municipality in the Qabala Rayon of Azerbaijan. It has a population of 1,850. The municipality consists of the villages of Tikanlı and Dandıx.
