= Nohurqışlaq =

- Municipality
- Location within Azerbaijan Location within Shaki-Zagatala Economic Region
- Coordinates: 40°56′46″N 47°53′26″E
- Country: Azerbaijan
- Rayon: Qabala

Population
  - Total: 2,780
- Time zone: UTC+4 (AZT)
  - Summer (DST): UTC+5 (AZT)
- Climate: Cfa

Nohurqışlaq (also Nourkyshlag and Nourkyshlak) is a village and municipality in the Qabala Rayon of Azerbaijan. It has a population of 2,780.
