= Amirvan =

- Municipality
- Location within Azerbaijan Location within Shaki-Zagatala Economic Region
- Coordinates: 40°49′51″N 47°53′32″E
- Country: Azerbaijan
- District: Qabala

Population
  - Total: 1,527
- Time zone: UTC+4 (AZT)

Amirvan (Azerbaijani: Əmirvan) is a village and municipality in the Qabala District of Azerbaijan. It has a population of 1,527.
