= Yuzbashevan =

- Location within Azerbaijan Location within Shaki-Zagatala Economic Region
- Coordinates: 41°07′44″N 47°46′40″E
- Country: Azerbaijan
- Rayon: Qabala
- Time zone: UTC+4 (AZT)
  - Summer (DST): UTC+5 (AZT)

Yuzbashevan is a village in the Qabala Rayon of Azerbaijan, with an elevation of 1,811 metres (5,942 feet).
