= Tövlə =

Tavla
- Municipality
- Location within Azerbaijan Location within Shaki-Zagatala Economic Region
- Coordinates: 40°53′09″N 47°43′54″E
- Country: Azerbaijan
- Rayon: Qabala

Population
  - Total: 698
- Time zone: UTC+4 (AZT)
  - Summer (DST): UTC+5 (AZT)

Tövlə is a village and municipality in the Qabala Rayon of Azerbaijan. It has a population of 698.
