= Zərgərli =

Village in Bum, Qabala Rayon, Azerbaijan

Coordinates: 41.014444°N 47.778056°E

Zərgərli is a village in the municipality of Bum in the Qabala Rayon of Azerbaijan.

The word "Zərgərli" originates from the word "zərgər" in the Azerbaijani language and carries a meaning related to the craft of jewelry-making.
