= Dzhodzhukh =

- Village
- Location within Azerbaijan
- Coordinates: 40°56′03″N 47°47′24″E
- Country: Azerbaijan
- Rayon: Qabala
- Time zone: UTC+4 (AZT)
  - Summer (DST): UTC+5 (AZT)

Dzhodzhukh is a village in the Qabala Rayon of Azerbaijan.
