= Solquca =

- Location within Azerbaijan Location within Shaki-Zagatala Economic Region
- Coordinates: 41°02′11″N 47°40′41″E
- Country: Azerbaijan
- Rayon: Qabala
- Municipality: Mıxlıqovaq
- Time zone: UTC+4 (AZT)
  - Summer (DST): UTC+5 (AZT)

Solquca (also, Solqıça, Solgudzha, and Solgudzha-Kazmalar) is a village in the Qabala Rayon of Azerbaijan. The village is part of the municipality of Mıxlıqovaq.
