= Tüntül =

- Municipality
- Location within Azerbaijan Location within Shaki-Zagatala Economic Region
- Coordinates: 40°55′08″N 47°52′16″E
- Country: Azerbaijan
- Rayon: Qəbələ

Population
  - Total: 2,500
- Time zone: UTC+4 (AZT)
  - Summer (DST): UTC+5 (AZT)
- Climate: Cfa

Tüntül (also, Tyuntyul’ and Tyuntyuli) is a village and municipality in the Qabala Rayon of Azerbaijan. It has a population of 2,500.

== Notable natives ==
- Intigam Atakishiyev — National Hero of Azerbaijan.
