= Sırt Yenigicə =

- Municipality
- Location within Azerbaijan Location within Shaki-Zagatala Economic Region
- Coordinates: 40°51′43″N 47°48′56″E
- Country: Azerbaijan
- Rayon: Qabala

Population
  - Total: 400
- Time zone: UTC+4 (AZT)
  - Summer (DST): UTC+5 (AZT)

Sırt Yenigicə (also, Çırt-Yengica, Syrt Yengidzha, and Syrt-Yenidzhe) is a village and municipality in the Qabala Rayon of Azerbaijan. It has a population of 400.
