= Mıxlıqovaq =

- Municipality
- Location within Azerbaijan Location within Shaki-Zagatala Economic Region
- Coordinates: 40°59′20″N 47°43′38″E
- Country: Azerbaijan
- Rayon: Qabala

Population
  - Total: 3,788
- Time zone: UTC+4 (AZT)
  - Summer (DST): UTC+5 (AZT)

Mıxlıqovaq (also, Mykhlykovag, Mykhlykuvak, and Mykhlykuvakh) is a village and municipality in the Qabala Rayon of Azerbaijan. It has a population of 3,788. The municipality consists of the villages of Mıxlıqovaq and Solquca. The village is locally famous for honey.
