= Quşlar, Qabala =

Quşlar
- Municipality
- Location within Azerbaijan Location within Shaki-Zagatala Economic Region
- Coordinates: 40°49′53″N 47°37′10″E
- Country: Azerbaijan
- Rayon: Qabala

Population
  - Total: 797
- Time zone: UTC+4 (AZT)
  - Summer (DST): UTC+5 (AZT)

Quşlar (also, Kushlar) is a village and municipality in the Qabala Rayon of Azerbaijan. It has a population of 797.
