= Bum, Azerbaijan =

Bum
- Municipality
- Location within Azerbaijan Location within Shaki-Zagatala Economic Region
- Coordinates: 41°00′52″N 47°46′41″E
- Country: Azerbaijan
- Rayon: Qabala

Population
  - Total: 5,095
- Time zone: UTC+4 (AZT)
  - Summer (DST): UTC+5 (AZT)

Bum is a village and municipality in the Qabala Rayon of Azerbaijan. It has a population of 5,095. The municipality consists of the villages of Bum, Zərgərli, and Qarasu.
