= Corlu, Azerbaijan =

Corlu
- Location within Azerbaijan Location within Shaki-Zagatala Economic Region
- Coordinates: 40°56′N 47°42′E
- Country: Azerbaijan
- Rayon: Qabala
- Municipality: Mirzəbəyli
- Time zone: UTC+4 (AZT)
  - Summer (DST): UTC+5 (AZT)

Corlu (also, Dzhorlu and Dzhorly) is a village in the Qabala Rayon of Azerbaijan. The village forms part of the municipality of Mirzəbəyli.
