= Yenikənd, Qabala =

Village in Qabala Rayon, Azerbaijan

Yenikənd is a municipality and village in the Qabala Rayon of Azerbaijan. It has a population of 5,000.
