= Soltannuxa =

- Municipality
- Location within Azerbaijan Location within Shaki-Zagatala Economic Region
- Coordinates: 40°53′24″N 47°46′56″E
- Country: Azerbaijan
- Rayon: Qabala

Population
  - Total: 2,610
- Time zone: UTC+4 (AZT)
  - Summer (DST): UTC+5 (AZT)

Soltannuxa (also, Soltan Nuxa and Soltannukha) is a village and municipality in the Qabala Rayon of Azerbaijan. It has a population of 2,610.
