= Mirzəbəyli =

- Municipality
- Location within Azerbaijan Location within Shaki-Zagatala Economic Region
- Coordinates: 40°55′42″N 47°43′40″E
- Country: Azerbaijan
- Rayon: Qabala

Population
  - Total: 2,381
- Time zone: UTC+4 (AZT)
  - Summer (DST): UTC+5 (AZT)

Mirzəbəyli (also, Mirzabeyli) is a village and municipality in the Qabala Rayon of Azerbaijan. It has a population of 2,381. The municipality consists of the villages of Mirzəbəyli və Corlu.
