= Şamlı, Zangilan =

Şamlı
- Location within Azerbaijan
- Coordinates: 39°08′59.9″N 46°36′57″E
- Country: Azerbaijan
- District: Zangilan
- Time zone: UTC+4 (AZT)
  - Summer (DST): UTC+5 (AZT)

Şamlı is a village in the Zangilan Rayon of Azerbaijan.
