= Naji, Kurdistan =

Naji نجي
- Village
- Location within Iran
- Coordinates: 35°15′09″N 46°36′09″E
- Country: Iran
- Province: Kurdistan
- County: Sanandaj
- Bakhsh: Kalatrazan
- Rural District: Zhavarud-e Gharbi

Population (2006)
  - Total: 310
- Time zone: UTC+3:30 (IRST)
  - Summer (DST): UTC+4:30 (IRDT)

Naji (Persian: نجي, also Romanized as Najī, Nojī, and Nejey; also known as Najeh, Najjeh, Nejeh-ye Ḩeydar Shāh, Nīj, and Nije) is a village in Zhavarud-e Gharbi Rural District, Kalatrazan District, Sanandaj County, Kurdistan Province, Iran. At the 2006 census, its population was 310, in 70 families. The village is populated by Kurds.
