= Hunanlar =

- Municipality
- Location within Azerbaijan
- Coordinates: 41°04′06″N 45°46′05″E
- Country: Azerbaijan
- Rayon: Tovuz

Population
  - Total: 1,674
- Time zone: UTC+4 (AZT)
  - Summer (DST): UTC+5 (AZT)

Hunanlar (known as Girzan or Kirzan until 2012, after its Armenian name Armenian: Կրզէն, romanized: Krzēn) is a village and municipality in the Tovuz Rayon of Azerbaijan. It has a population of 1,674.

Historically an Armenian settlement, its population was expelled by Azerbaijanis during inter-ethnic conflicts in the 1910s; it is currently fully Azerbaijani-populated.

== Etymology ==
The original name of the settlement was Krzen, which later morphed into "Girzan" or "Kirzan". The name Krzen comes from the Armenian words "կրի" ("kri", fight) and "զէնք" ("zēnk", weapon). This can be explained by the fact that in addition to the Armenian-populated villages in the region, there were many hostile Tatar (today called Azerbaijani) settlements, the inhabitants of which often attacked the Armenians; the local population thus had to be armed to protect the village.

== Armenian Exodus ==
Russian sources dating back to 1905–06 describe the town as an isolated Armenian island surrounded by many Turkic villages: "[I]t is the only Armenian village that is left completely in the field".

Prior to its destruction, Krzen had not only survived for centuries, but achieved remarkable economic prosperity. From ancient times, the people of Krzen were engaged in winemaking, silkworm breeding, silk production, and exported their products to different countries. By the 17th century, Krzen had become a vibrant center of Armenian commerce; the tombstones of the local cemetery are the best proof of that: "[M]erchants from Tabriz, Halabja, Karnetsi and other cities are all concentrated here".

During the Armenian-Azerbaijani War, most citizens of Krzen were exiled to Armenia, namely: Shamshadin, the Ararat Province (1 family in the Lusarat, Lus, and Pokr Vedi villages each), Masis (40-45 families in Sis village); some left for Russia: Sochi-Adler (10-15 families), (Moscow (4 families), Saratov (8-9 families), the Sverdlovsk Oblast (3 families), Omsk (about 10 families) and other cities throughout the Soviet Union.
