= Quşlar, Kurdamir =

Quşlar is a village and municipality in the Kurdamir District of Azerbaijan.
