= Nij, Azerbaijan =

Nij 𐕎𐔼𐕑 Nic
- Municipality
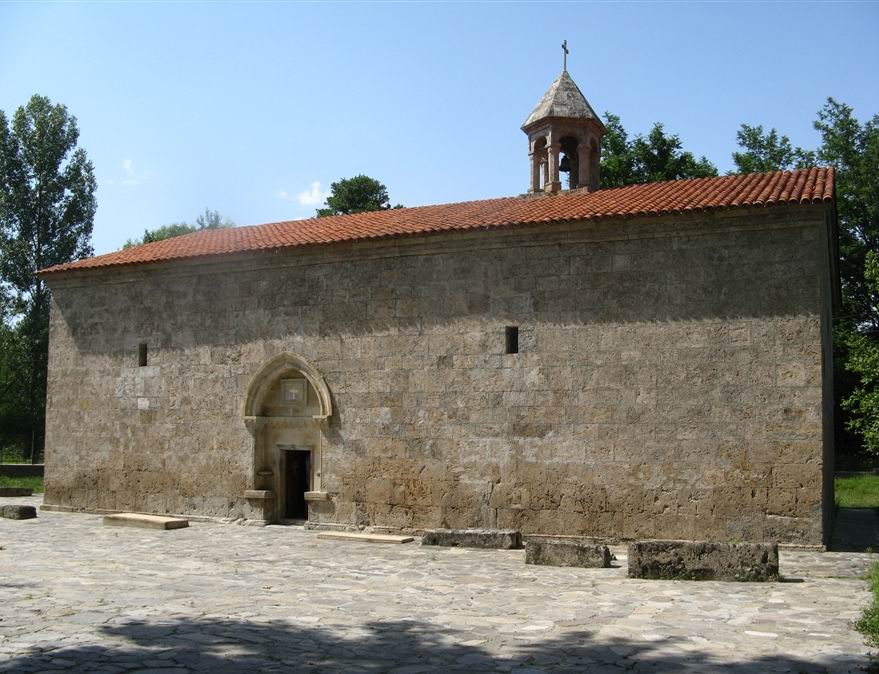
- Albanian-Udi Jotari Church in Nij

- Location within Azerbaijan Location within Shaki-Zagatala Economic Region
- Coordinates: 40°56′42″N 47°40′09″E
- Country: Azerbaijan
- District: Qabala

Population
  - Total: 5,744
- Time zone: UTC+4 (AZT)
  - Summer (DST): UTC+5 (AZT)
- Climate: Cfa

Nij (Azerbaijani: Nic; Udi: 𐕎𐔼𐕑; also known as Nidzh) is a town in the Qabala District of Azerbaijan. Located 40 kilometers south-west of the city of Qabala, Nij is one of the world's few settlements of Udi people. It has a population of 5,744.

== History ==
The Caucasian Albanian-Udi Apostolic Autocephalous Church is located in Nij.

The first Udi school and subsequently a Russian rural school were opened in Nij in 1854. From 1931 to 1933, Udis received education in their own language; in 1937 they began to receive education in the Azerbaijani language.

Ethnic Udis in Nij today are involved in a variety of vocations, which include farming, cattle breeding, rice cultivation, sericulture, horticulture, poultry farming, craftsmanship and viticulture.

Alexandre Dumas père, the French writer, in his book Voyage to the Caucasus (1859), provides detailed information about the specific economic activities, language and culture of Nij.

== Controversy ==
In 2004 the Church of Saint Elisæus in Nij was renovated as part of a project financed by the Norwegian Humanitarian Enterprise. The destruction of Armenian inscriptions associated with the church during the renovations prompted a protest by Norway's ambassador to Azerbaijan, Steinar Gil.

In May 2018, the Foreign Minister of Armenia submitted a report to the UN General Assembly saying that the erasing of the Armenian inscriptions at Nij was evidence that "all restoration work of Christian architectural monuments in Azerbaijan was carried out in such a way as to destroy the traces of Armenian architecture, as well as the Armenian inscriptions".

== Gallery ==
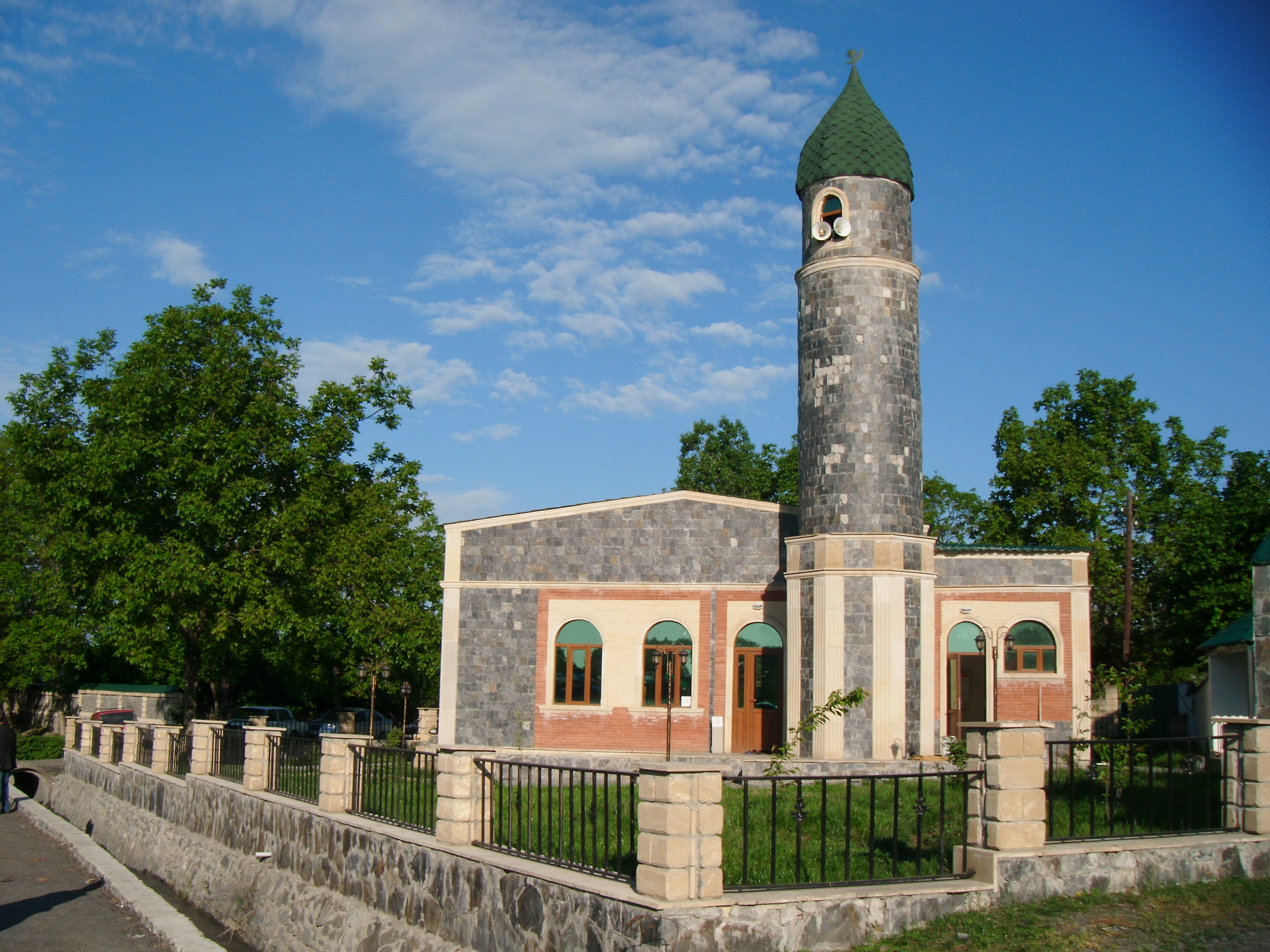
Mosque in Nij

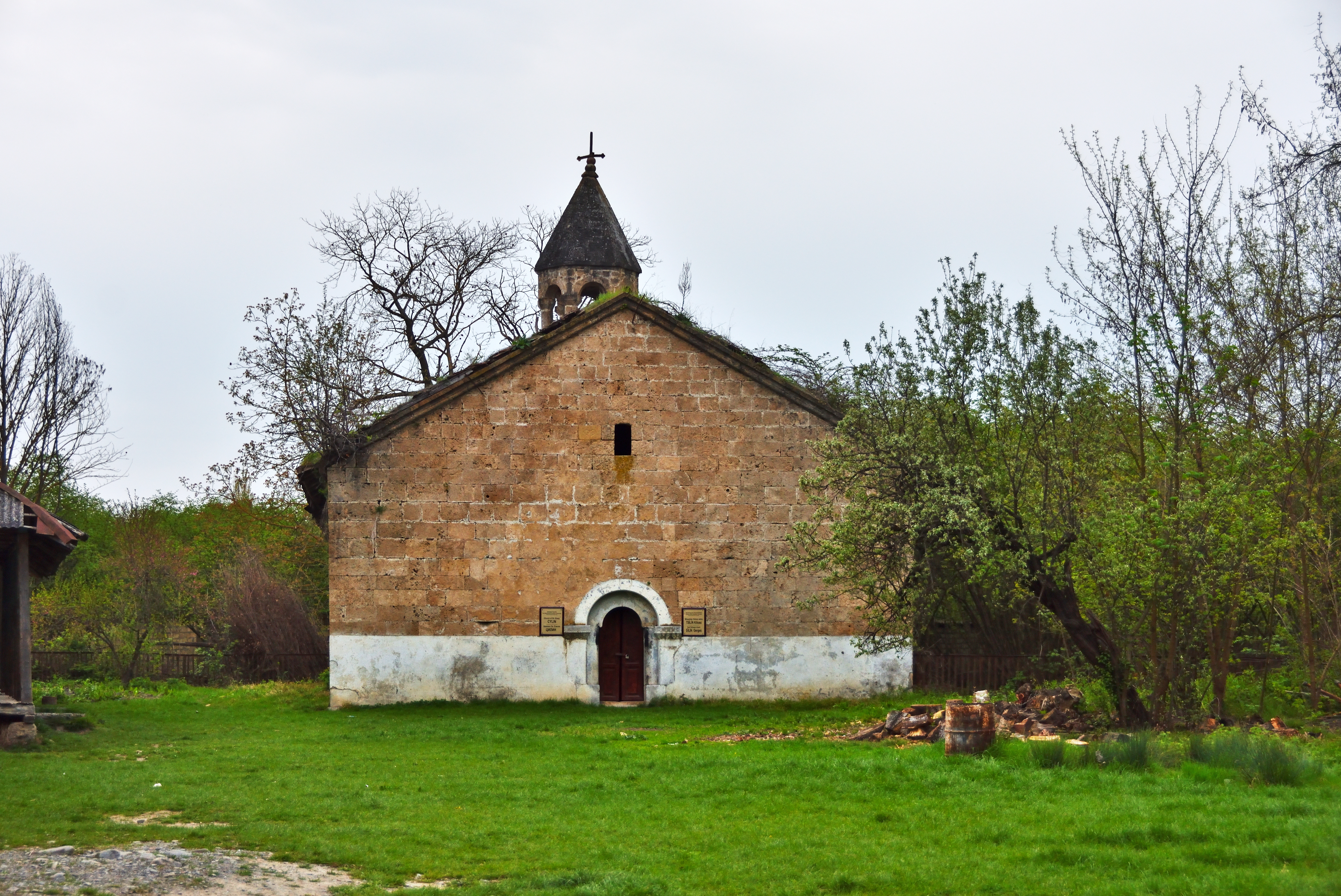
Tsilin Church

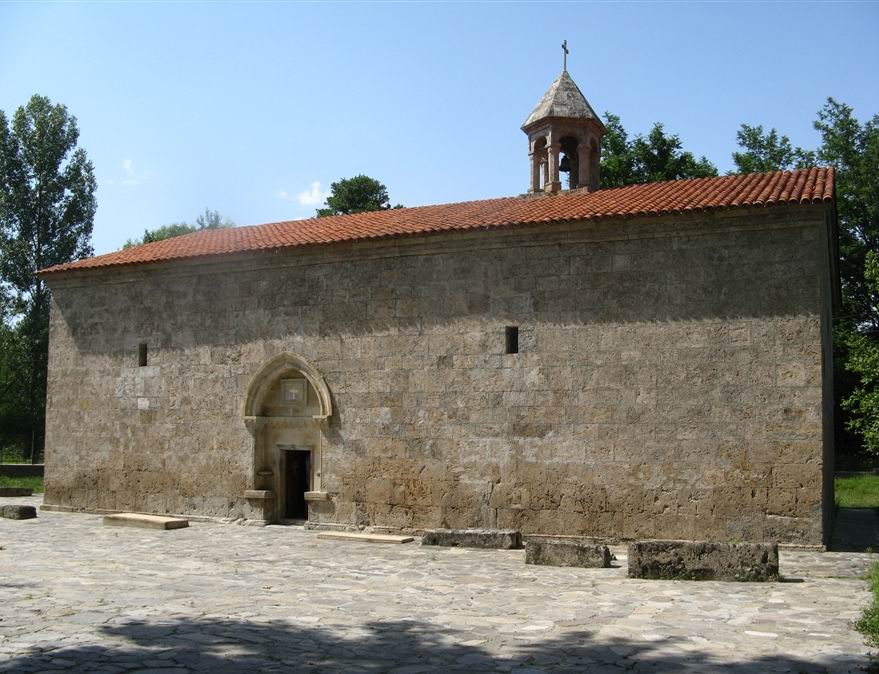
Church of Saint Elisæus
