= Qarabulaq, Oghuz =

Garabulag
- Municipality
- Azerbaijani: Qarabulaq
- Location within Azerbaijan
- Coordinates: 40°52′41″N 47°34′50″E
- Country: Azerbaijan
- District: Oghuz

Population
  - Total: 739
- Time zone: UTC+4 (AZT)
  - Summer (DST): UTC+5 (AZT)

Qarabulaq (also, Garabulag) is a village and municipality in the Oghuz District of Azerbaijan. It has a population of 739.
