= Zrykh =

Zrykh Зрых Цуругъ
- Selo
- Location within Republic of Dagestan Location within Russia
- Coordinates: 41°29′N 47°33′E
- Country: Russia
- Region: Republic of Dagestan
- District: Akhtynsky District
- Time zone: UTC+3:00

Zrykh (Russian: Зрых; Lezgian: Цуругъ) is a rural locality (a selo) in Akhtynsky District, Republic of Dagestan, Russia. The population was 1,839 as of 2010. There are 4 streets.

== Geography ==
Zrykh is located 18 km northwest of Akhty (the district's administrative centre) by road. Khlyut is the nearest rural locality.
