= Gelmets =

Gelmets Гельмец Гелмец
- Selo
- Location within Republic of Dagestan Location within Russia
- Coordinates: 41°37′N 47°10′E
- Country: Russia
- Region: Republic of Dagestan
- District: Rutulsky District
- Time zone: UTC+3:00

Gelmets (Russian: Гельмец; Tsakhur: Гелмец) is a rural locality (a selo) and the administrative centre of Gelmetsinskoye Rural Settlement, Rutulsky District, Republic of Dagestan, Russia. Population: 609 (2010 census); 569 (2002 census); 550 (1989 Soviet census). There are 3 streets.

== Geography ==
Gelmets is located at the foot of the Gelmets-Akhtynsky ridge. It is located 31 km northwest of Rutul (the district's administrative centre) by road. Mikik and Tsakhur are the nearest rural localities.

== Nationalities ==
Tsakhur people live there.
