= Steinar Gil =

Norwegian philologist and diplomat

Norwegian Ambassador to Azerbaijan
- In office 2002–2006
- Preceded by: Olav Berstad
- Succeeded by: Hans Wilhelm Longva

Norwegian Ambassador to Lithuania
- In office 2006–2011
- Succeeded by: Dag M. Halvorsen

Personal details
- Born: Steinar Gil; January 27, 1943 (age 82); Norway
- Education: University of Oslo

Steinar Gil (born 27 January 1943) is a Norwegian philologist and diplomat.

== Career ==
He was born in Oslo, and worked at the University of Oslo from 1972 to 1980. He started working for the Norwegian Ministry of Foreign Affairs in 1984, being promoted to assistant secretary in 1993. He served at the embassy of Norway in Moscow from 1996 to 1999, before returning to the Ministry of Foreign Affairs as head of the Eastern Europe department. He then served at the Norwegian ambassador to Azerbaijan from 2002 to 2006, and to Lithuania from 2006 to 2011.

== Azerbaijan protests ==
Gil became notable for his outspokenness regarding the 2003 Azerbaijani protests and their aftermaths. During his ambassadorship, he criticized Azerbaijani President Ilham Aliyev for his "crude violence" towards protestors who were demanding fair elections and election transparency. He stated:

"I saw harsh violence at the hands of the police. I saw a bloodied man. These people are not a threat. Azerbaijan had the chance to show that it was a normal country with democratic principles."

Following his criticism of the Aliyev government, Gil was inundated with smear attacks from state media in Azerbaijan. In 2004, the parliament pushed for a motion to declare him a persona-non-grata. He was declared the 'Ambassador of the Year' for 2003 by the Human Rights House Foundation.

In 2006, a year following the protests, Gil left his position as ambassador to Azerbaijan and became ambassador to Lithuania.
