= Udi language =

Northeast Caucasian language

Udi
- Uti, Udin
- удин муз, udin muz, 𐕒𐕡𐔳𐔼𐕎 𐕌𐕒𐕡𐔵
- Pronunciation: [udin muz]
- Native to: Azerbaijan, Russia, Georgia
- Region: Azerbaijan (Qabala and Oguz), Russia (North Caucasus), Georgia (Kvareli), and Armenia (Tavush)
- Ethnicity: Udi people
- Native speakers: 3,800 in Azerbaijan (2011); 1,860 in Russia (2020); 90 in Georgia (2015)
- Language family: Northeast Caucasian: Lezgic; Samur; Udi
- Early form: Caucasian Albanian
- Dialects: Nidzh; Oktomberi; Vartashen
- Writing system: Cyrillic, Latin, Caucasian Albanian

Language codes
- ISO 639-3: udi
- Glottolog: udii1243
- ELP: Udi
- Udi

- Udi is classified as Severely Endangered by the UNESCO Atlas of the World's Languages in Danger.

Udi (also called Uti or Udin) is a language spoken by the Udi people and a member of the Lezgic branch of the Northeast Caucasian language family. It is believed an earlier form of it was the main language of Caucasian Albania, which stretched from south Dagestan to current day Azerbaijan. The Old Udi language is also called the Caucasian Albanian language and possibly corresponds to the "Gargarian" language identified by medieval Armenian historians. Modern Udi is known simply as Udi.

== History ==
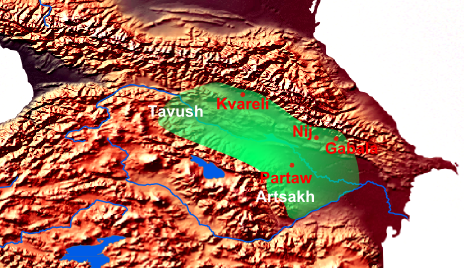
Old Udi was spoken from Tavush province and eastern Artsakh in the west to the city of Qəbələ in the east, an area centered around Utik province and the city of Partaw (now Barda).

The Udi language can most appropriately be broken up into five historical stages:

Early Udi	around 2000 BC – 300 AD
Old Udi	300–900
Middle Udi	900–1800
Early Modern Udi	1800–1920
Modern Udi	1920–present

Soon after the year 700, the Old Udi language had probably ceased to be used for any purpose other than as the liturgical language of the Church of Caucasian Albania.

== Speakers ==
The language is spoken by about 4,000 people in the village of Nij, Azerbaijan, in Qabala District, in Oghuz District, as well as in parts of the North Caucasus in Russia. It is also spoken by ethnic Udis living in the villages of Debetavan, Bagratashen, Ptghavan, and Haghtanak in Tavush Province of northeastern Armenia, and in the village of Zinobiani (former Oktomberi) in the Qvareli Municipality of the Kakheti province of Georgia.

Udi is endangered, classified as "severely endangered" by UNESCO's Red Book of Endangered Languages.

== Phonology ==
=== Vowels ===
Vowels of Udi
	Front	Central	Back
Close	i iˤ (y)		u uˤ
Mid	ɛ ɛˤ (œ)	ə	ɔ ɔˤ
Open	(æ)		ɑ ɑˤ

=== Consonants ===
Consonant phonemes of Udi
		Labial	Dental	Alveolar		Palatal	Velar	Uvular	Glottal
		Labial	Dental	lenis	fortis	Palatal	Velar	Uvular	Glottal
Nasal		m	n						
Plosive	voiced	b	d				ɡ		
Plosive	voiceless	p	t				k	q	
Plosive	ejective	pʼ	tʼ				kʼ	qʼ	
Affricate	voiced		d͡z	d͡ʒ	d͡ʒː				
Affricate	voiceless		t͡s	t͡ʃ	t͡ʃː				
Affricate	ejective		t͡sʼ	t͡ʃʼ	t͡ʃʼː				
Fricative	voiceless	f	s	ʃ	ʃː		x		h
Fricative	voiced	v	z	ʒ	ʒː		ɣ		
Trill				r					
Approximant			l			j			

Old Udi, unlike modern Udi, did not have the close-mid front rounded vowel /ø/. Old Udi contained an additional series of palatalized consonants.

== Alphabets ==
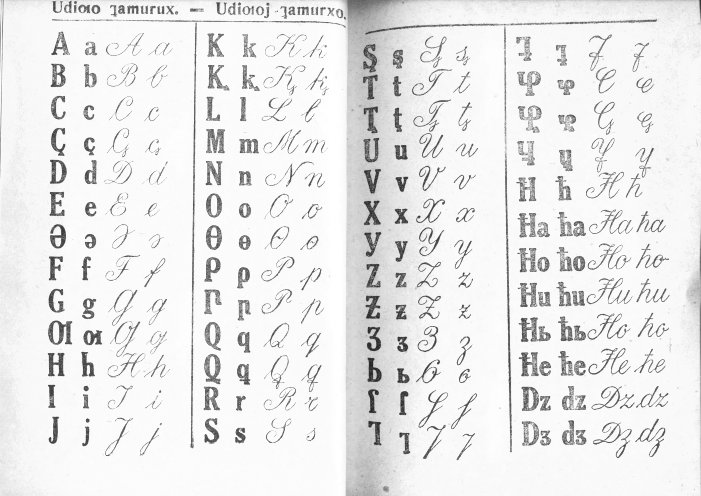
Udi Latin alphabet table from a 1934 book

The Old Udi language used the Caucasian Albanian alphabet. As evidenced by Old Udi documents discovered at Saint Catherine's Monastery in Egypt dating from the 7th century, the Old Udi language used 50 of the 52 letters identified by Armenian scholars in later centuries as having been used in Udi language texts.

In the 1930s, there was an attempt by Soviet authorities to create an Udi alphabet based on the Latin alphabet, as shown in the image, but its usage ceased after a short time.

In 1974, a Udi alphabet based on the Cyrillic alphabet was compiled by V. L. Gukasyan. The alphabet in his Udi-Azerbaijani-Russian Dictionary is as follows:

А а	Аъ аъ	Аь аь	Б б	В в	Г г	Гъ гъ	Гь гь	Д д	Дж дж	ДжӀ джӀ
Дз дз	Е е	Ж ж	ЖӀ жӀ	З з	И и	Й й	К к	Ҝ ҝ	КӀ кӀ	Къ къ
Л л	М м	Н н	О о	Оь оь	П п	ПӀ пӀ	Р р	С с	Т т	ТӀ тӀ
У у	Уь Уь	Ф ф	Х х	Хъ хъ	Ц ц	Ц' ц'	ЦӀ цӀ	Ч ч	Ч' ч'	ЧӀ чӀ
Чъ чъ	Ш ш	ШӀ шӀ	Ы ы

This alphabet was also used in the 1996 collection Nana oččal (Нана очъал).

In the mid-1990s, a new Latin-based Udi alphabet was created in Azerbaijan. A primer and two collections of works by Georgy Kechaari were published using it and it was also used for educational purposes in the village of Nic. The alphabet is as follows:

A a	B b	C c	Ç ç	D d	E e	Ə ə	F f	G g	Ğ ğ	H h
X x	I ı	İ i	Ҝ ҝ	J j	K k	Q q	L l	M m	N n	O o
Ö ö	P p	R r	S s	Ş ş	T t	U u	Ü ü	V v	Y y	Z z
Ц ц	Цı цı	Eъ eъ	Tı tı	Əъ əъ	Kъ kъ	Pı pı	Xъ xъ	Şı şı	Öъ öъ	Çı çı
Çъ çъ	Ć ć	Jı jı	Zı zı	Uъ uъ	Oъ oъ	İъ iъ	Dz dz

In 2007 in Astrakhan, Vladislav Dabakov published a collection of Udi folklore with a Latin-based alphabet as follows:

A a	Ă ă	Ә ә	B b	C c	Ĉ ĉ	Ç ç	Ç' ç'	Č č	Ć ć	D d
E e	Ĕ ĕ	F f	G g	Ğ ğ	H h	I ı	İ i	Ĭ ĭ	J j	Ĵ ĵ
K k	K' k'	L l	M m	N n	O o	Ö ö	Ŏ ŏ	P p	P' p'	Q q
Q' q'	R r	S s	Ś ś	S' s'	Ŝ ŝ	Ş ş	T t	T' t'	U u	Ü ü
Ŭ ŭ	V v	X x	Y y	Z z	Ź ź

In 2013 in Russia, an Udi primer, Nanay muz (Нанай муз), was published with a Cyrillic-based alphabet, a modified version of the one used by V. L. Gukasyan in the Udi-Azerbaijani-Russian Dictionary. The alphabet is as follows:

А а	Аь аь	Аъ аъ	Б б	В в	Г г	Гъ гъ	Гь гь	Д д	Дз дз	Дж дж
Джъ джъ	Е е	Ж ж	Жъ жъ	З з	И и	Иъ иъ	Й й	К к	К' к'	Къ къ
Л л	М м	Н н	О о	Оь оь	Оъ оъ	П п	П' п'	Р р	С с	Т т
Т' т'	У у	Уь уь	Уъ уъ	Ф ф	Х х	Хъ хъ	Ц ц	Ц' ц'	Ч ч	Чъ чъ
Ч' ч'	Ч’ъ ч’ъ	Ш ш	Шъ шъ	Ы ы	Э э	Эъ эъ	Ю ю	Я я

== Morphology ==
Udi is agglutinating with a tendency towards being fusional. Udi affixes are mostly suffixes or infixes, but there are a few prefixes. Old Udi used mostly suffixes. Most affixes are restricted to specific parts of speech. Some affixes behave as clitics. The word order is SOV.

Udi does not have gender, but has declension classes. Old Udi, however, did reflect grammatical gender within anaphoric pronouns.

=== Noun ===
Udi has a complex case system of 11 cases with 3 inflectional types:

1. Absolutive inflection (AI). Basis for oblique cases
2. Oblique inflection (OI). Characterised by additional morpheme ("stem augment"), usually -n-
3. Ergative inflection (EI). Serves as a basis for the other oblique cases.

==== Case ====
		Absolutive	Oblique	Ergative
Absolutive	-	ğar	mex	xe
Ergative	-en	ğar-en	mex-n-en	xe-n
Genitive	-Vy, -un	ğar-i	mex-n-ay	xe-n-ey
Dative1	-V	ğar-a	mex-n-u	xe-n-e
Dative2	-V-x	ğar-a-x	mex-n-u-x	xe-n-e-x
Ablative	-V-xo	ğar-a-xo	mex-n-u-xo	xe-n-e-xo
Comitative	-V-xol	g/ar-a-xol	---	---
Superessive	-V-l	ğar-a-l	mex-n-u-l	xe-n-e-l
Allative	-V-ć	ğar-a-ć	mex-n-u-ć	xe-n-e-ć
Adessive	-V-st'a	ğar-a-st'a	mex-n-u-st'a	xe-n-est'e
Benefactive	-en-k'ena, -enk'	ğar-enk'ena	---	---

ğar means 'son'; mex means 'scythe'; xe means 'water' (note that OI is more common for xe). -V denotes voiced consonant.

== Sample text ==
Cyrillic alphabet (2007)	Latin alphabet (2007)	English translation
Са пасч'агъэн са пасч'агъаx ч'аxпи. Есиррэакъса энэсча ич оьлкина ич к'уа энэфса шэт'а пасч'агълугъаxал зафт'эбса. Къа усэнаxо yэсир пасч'агъэн xоишънэбса mэ пасч'агъаx тэ ватанбэз иxбафт'э, барта бэз оьлкинаx тагъа фурук'аз.	Sa pasç'ağen sa pasç'ağax ç'axpi. Yesirreaq'sa enesça iç ölkina iç k'ua enefsa şet'a pasç'ağluğaxal zaft'ebsa. Q'a usenaxo yesir pasç'ağen xoiŝnebsa me pasç'ağax te vatanbez ixbaft'e, barta bez ölkinax tağa furuk'az.	A king caught a king, imprisoned him and carried him to his own land, keeping in his own house. He ruled over that kingdom, too. After 20 years, the imprisoned king asked this king: "I'm thinking of my homeland, allow me to go to my land and I will examine it."

== See also ==
- Languages of the Caucasus
