= Qabala District =

District in northern Azerbaijan

Coordinates: 40°58′53″N 47°50′45″E

- District
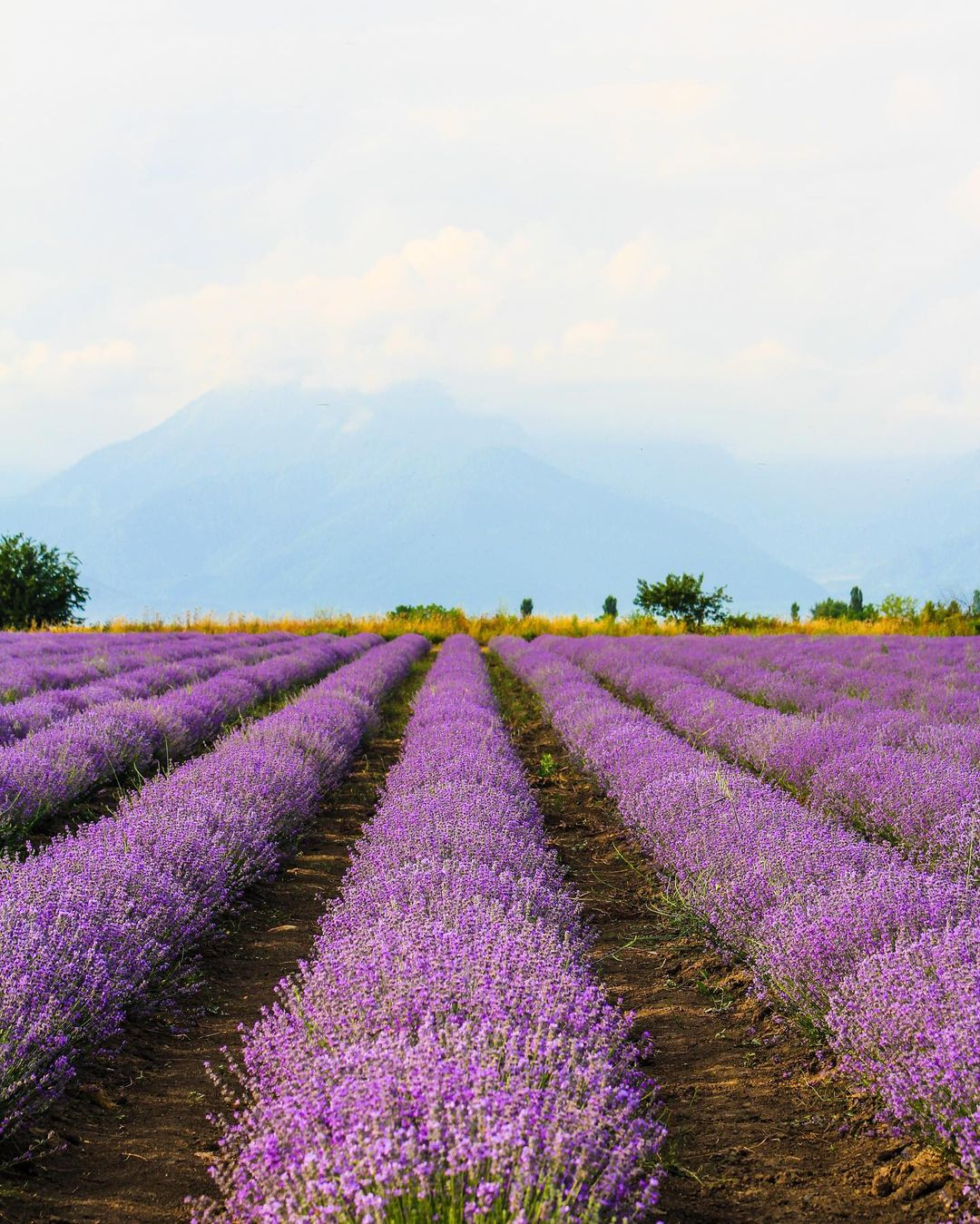

- Map of Azerbaijan showing Qabala District
- Country: Azerbaijan
- Region: Shaki-Zagatala
- Established: 8 August 1930
- Capital: Qabala
- Settlements: 64

Government
  - Governor: Sabuhi Abdullayev

Area
  - Total: 1,550 km^{2} (600 sq mi)

Population (2020)
  - Total: 107,800
  - Density: 69.5/km^{2} (180/sq mi)
- Time zone: UTC+4 (AZT)
- Postal code: 3600
- Website: qabala-ih.gov.az

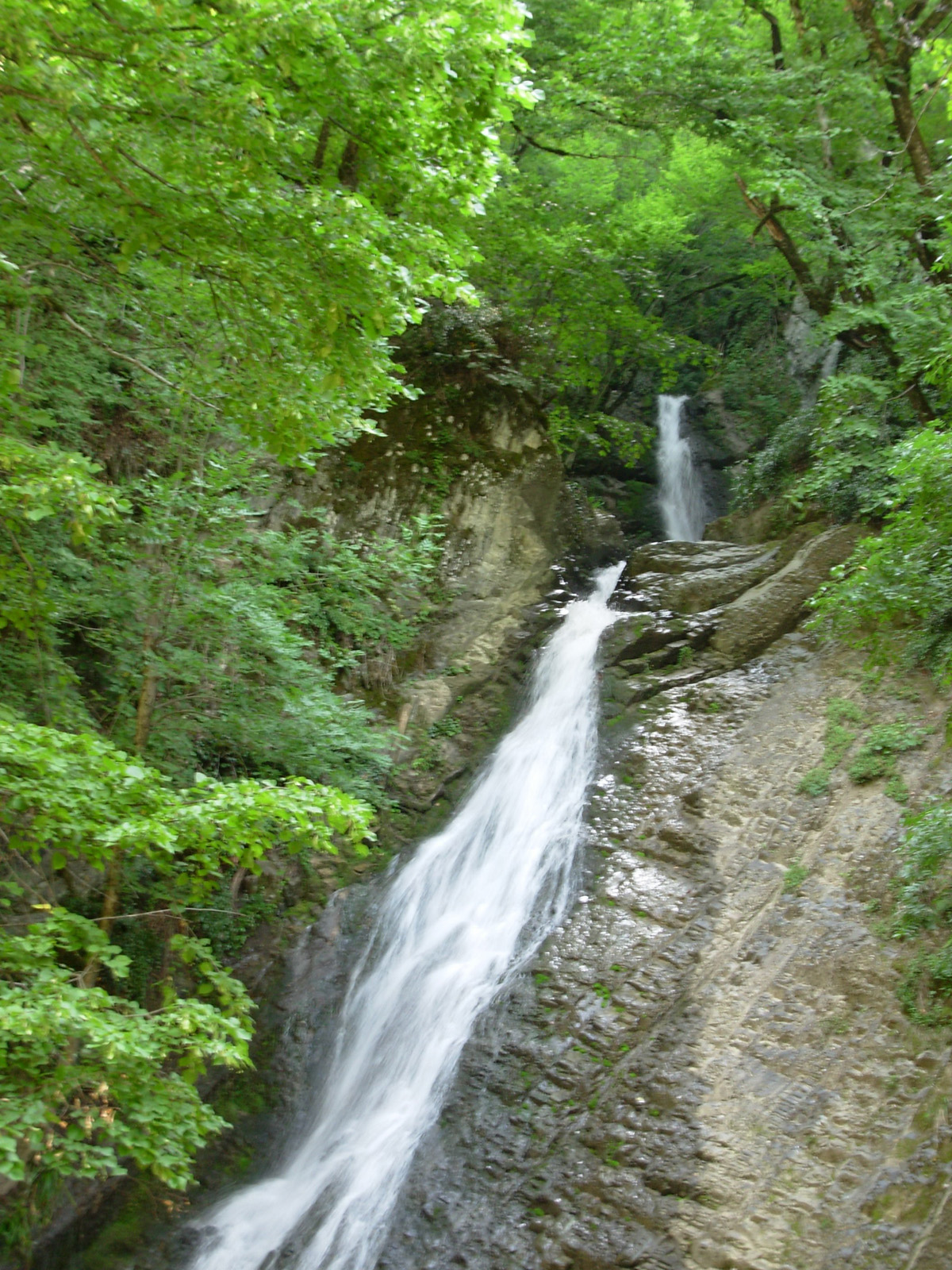
A waterfall in Gabala district of Azerbaijan

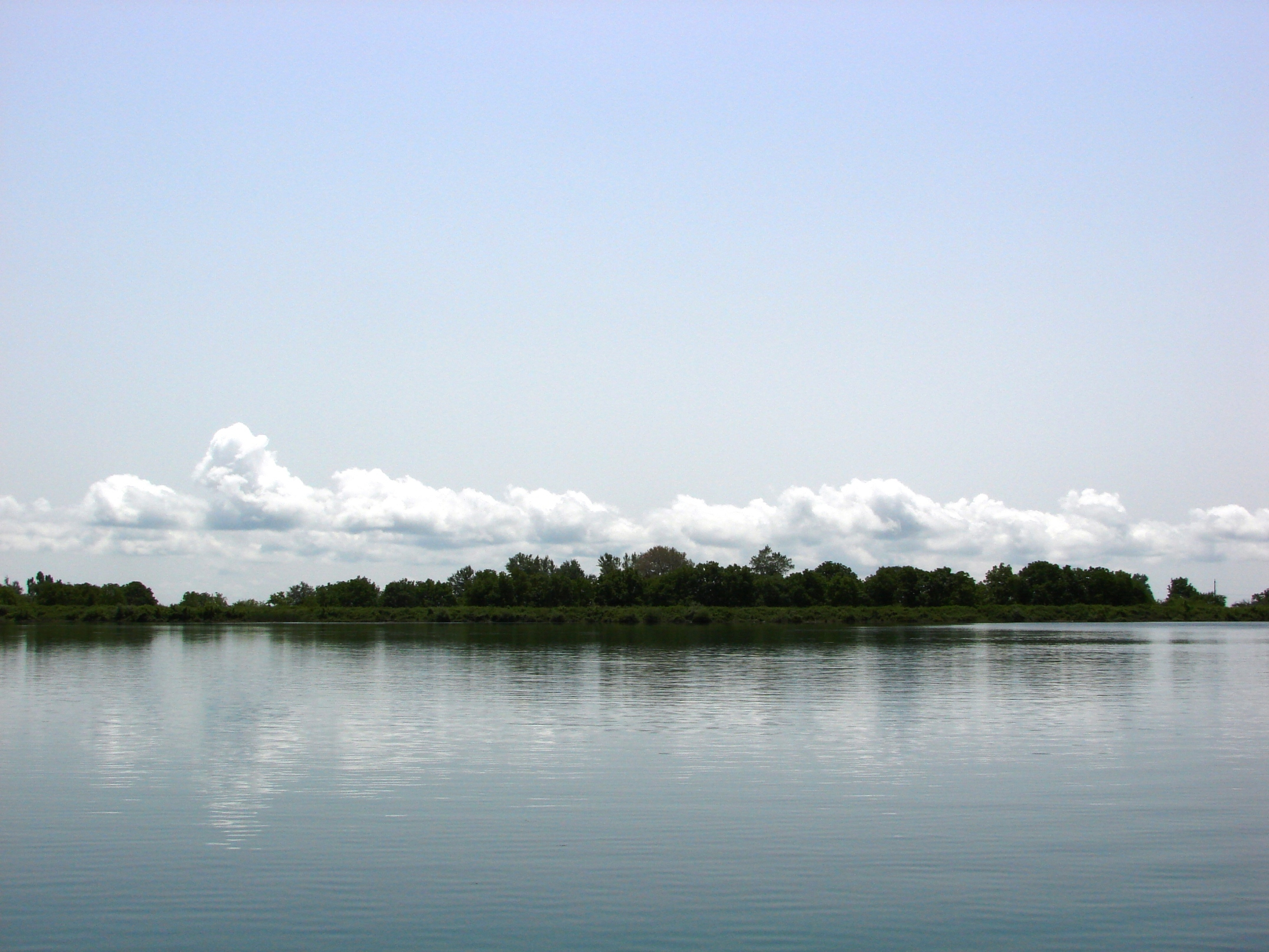
Nohur lake in Gabala district of Azerbaijan

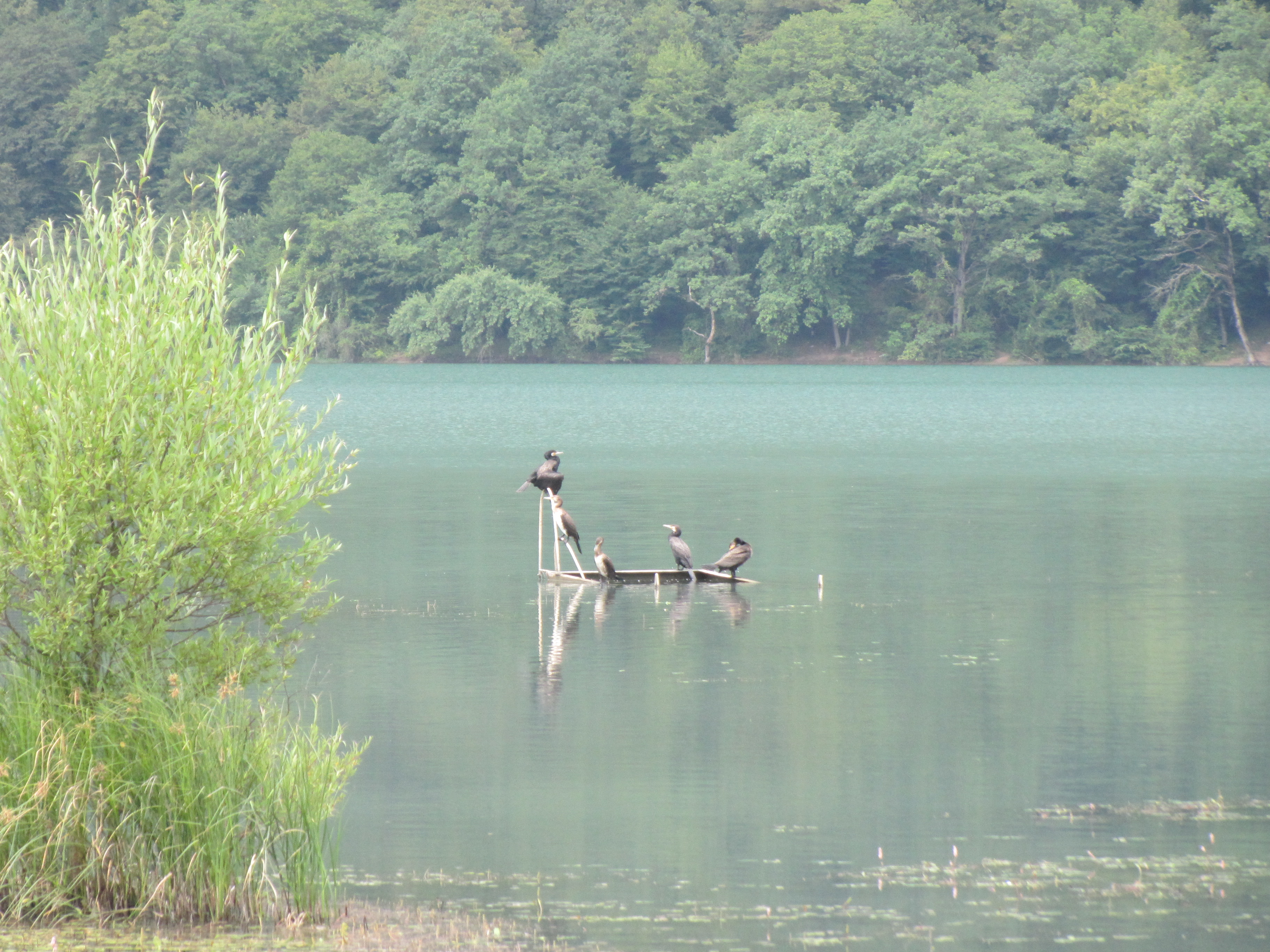
Nohur lake

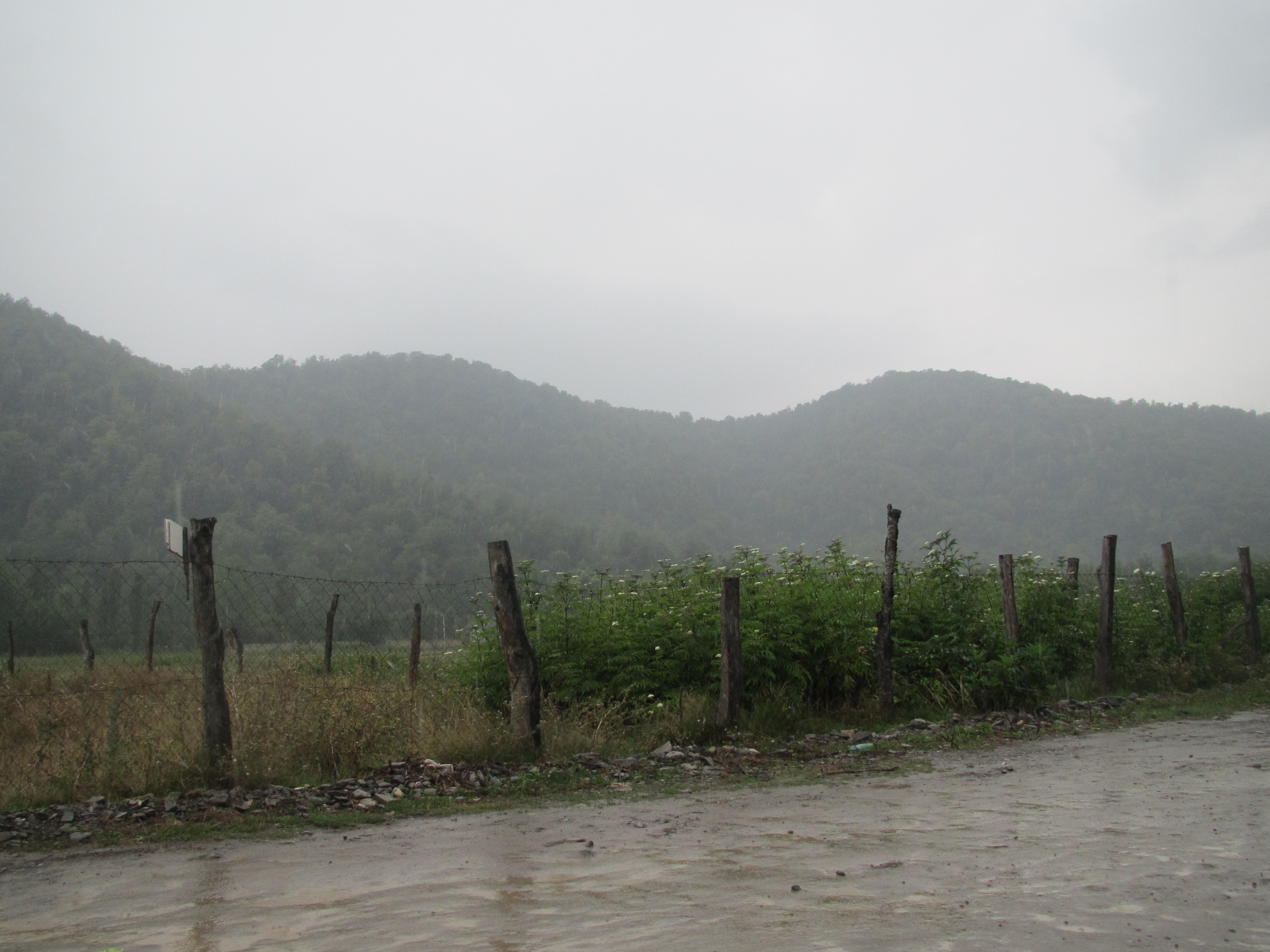
Rainy day in Qabala

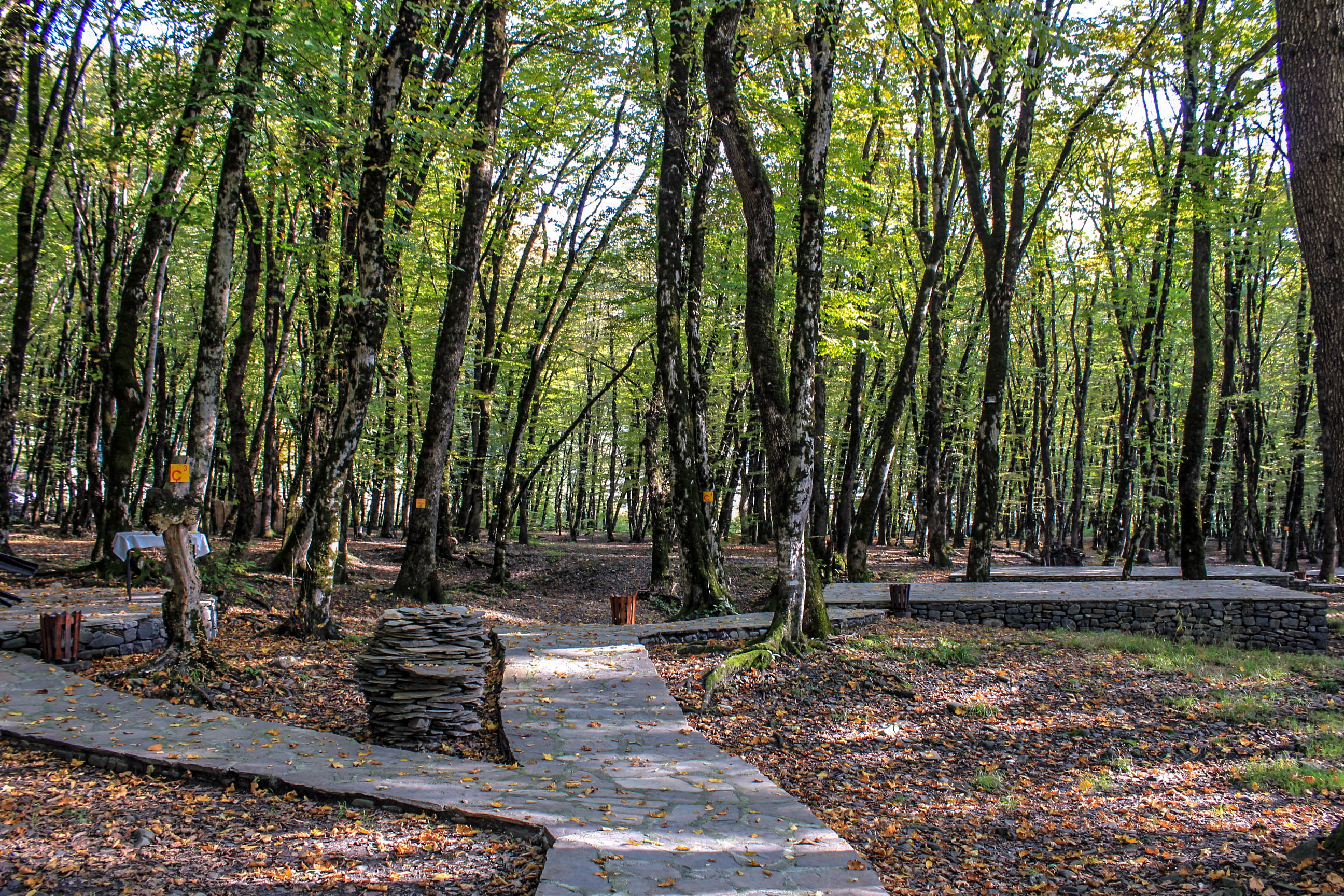
Forest close to the town of Qabala

Qabala District (Azerbaijani: Qəbələ rayonu) is one of the 66 districts of Azerbaijan. It is located in the north of the country in the Shaki-Zagatala Economic Region. The district borders the districts of Oghuz, Shaki, Agdash, Goychay, Ismayilli, Quba, Qusar, and the Russian Republic of Dagestan. Its capital and largest city is Qabala. As of 2020, the district had a population of 107,800.

== History ==
Qabala is named for ancient Gabala, the capital city of the ancient state of Caucasian Albania. The ruins of the old city are located 20 kilometres southwest of the present center of the district. The remnants of the large buildings, city gates, tower walls, and patterns of material culture indicate that Gabala was one of the most prominent cities at that time.

Ancient Gabala was founded as a city in the late 4th-early 3rd century BC and survived up to the mid-18th century AD. Many changes occurred in the life of the city through the period of its existence. Due to different historical events, the city was damaged more than once.

Though the Roman troops attacked Albania in the 60s BC, they were unable to occupy Gabala. During the Sassanid period, Qabala was a large trade and handicraft center. The situation remained the same in the times of the Islamic caliphate. Though Qabala experienced a decline during the Mongolian invasion in the 13th century, it was restored later. Qabala lost its position in the mid-18th century, and the population gradually declined.

The small feudal state Qutqashen Sultanate was established on the territory of Qabala in the mid-18th century. It was later included in the Shaki Khanate and was ruled by the Shaki naibs appointed by the khans of Shaki.

Following the downfall of the Shaki Khanate, the Qutqashen sultanate was included in the Shaki province. The Qutqashen district was created in 1930. The district was renamed back to Qabala in March 1991, after the fall of the Soviet Union.

== Geography ==
Most of Gabala district is composed of mountains that begin from the highlands of the South slope of the north part of the Caucasus spreading to the central part of the Alazan-Haftaran (Ganikh-Ayrichay) valley. The south part spreads from the frontal highlands of Ajinohur to the Gabala high plateau, and the south border of this high plateau substitutes orographic units of Surkhaykhan (Akhar-Bakhar) chain of mountains up to the watershed. The Saral, Choban Baba, Muchug, Tufan, and Aghbulag mountain ranges all together form branches of the watershed of Greater Caucasus which encompasses the territory of the region as a chain from the west to the east. The territory of the Gabala region is divided into three areas in geomorphological terms: the mountainous area, plains, and high plateau. The hilly relief forms in the territory of Gabala alternate with one another from highlands to intermontane valleys, from deep scattered precipitous ravines to plane surfaced plateaus. The highest peaks of the Great Caucasus within Azerbaijan is also located in this region (in the northern borders of Gabala). Bazarduzu (4466 m), Tufandagh (4206 m), Bazaryurd (4126 m) and Shahdagh (4243 m) are the highest peaks located here. It is estimated that two major mountain glaciers of 6 km existing in Azerbaijan exist merely on the above peaks (excluding 0.15 km 2 glaciers on Gapichig peak (Nakhchivan).

=== Rivers ===
The mountainous relief forms and high humidity of the climate in the Gabala district are the primary reasons for the formation of a thick river network in this region. The length of 486 rivers out of 8359 running in Azerbaijan territory is more than 10 km and 12 of them, and also 2 of 23 having a length of more than 100 km flowing from the south slope of the Greater Caucasus, are located in Gabala. Gara, Tikanli, Bum Hamzali, Damiraparan, and Vandam are considered the main rivers running in Gabala, which are the branches of the Turyanchay and Goychay rivers. The water supply of these rivers consists of subsoil water (40-50%), rainwater (25-30%), and snow water (20-30%) depending on seasons.

=== Lakes ===
Most of the lakes in the territory of the Gabala region were formed by glaciers and are usually located in mountainous areas. Tufanghol (3 277 m height from sea level), Kulak ghol (3,380 m height from sea level, which is also the highest lake in the region), Gotur ghol, Ismayil Bey Gutgachinli Lake (3,305 m height from sea level), and Nohur Lake are the major lakes mostly fed with snow and glacier waters.

== Economy ==
The Gabala district is located in the Shaki-Zagatala Economic Region in the northwestern part of Azerbaijan (southern hills of the Great Caucasus Mountains). The main sector of the regional economy is based on agriculture. The agriculture of the region encompasses tobacco-cultivation, silkworm breeding, tea growing, floriculture, paddy growing, fruit-growing, grain growing, wine growing, and sheep breeding.

== Events ==
Gabala International Music Festival is the major event held annually in August in Gabala, beginning in 2009 with the support of the Heydar Aliyev Foundation and organized by Azerbaijan's Culture and Tourism Ministry and Music Union. During this festival, musicians perform in the open air. The musicians participating in the festival, come from Europe, the US, and Israel, as well as republics of the former Soviet Union. Jazz and mugham evenings and piano competitions were held within the festival. Farhad Badalbeyli and Dmitry Yablonsky are the artistic directors of the event. Until now, Tbilisi City Hall Jazz Orchestra "BIG-BAND of Georgia, Jóvenes Clásicos Del Son of Cuba, Baku Chamber Orchestra of Azerbaijan, Budapest Gypsy Band of Hungary, and Jerusalem Symphony Orchestra of Israel have participated in this festival. Mugham, as well as classic, chamber, jazz, flamenco, and vocal music, are usually performed.

The International Jam Festival is another event that takes place in the Gabala district on a regular basis. It was started to be held in 2013 locally, and only the 11 regions attended in that year. Since 2014, the audience of the event has increased, and more than 20 cities and districts of Azerbaijan and foreign countries have participated in the festival. In 2015, the festival is attended by seven foreign countries (Russian Federation, Chuvashia Republic and Sakha Republic of Russian Federation, Serbia, Kyrgyzstan, Iran, Turkey) together with 30 cities and regions of Azerbaijan. In 2015, the festival is sponsored by the World Association of Culinary Organizations and the International Organization of Folk Arts. In 2016, participants from Turkey, Iran, Russia, Northern Cyprus, Ukraine, Uzbekistan, China, as well as participants from 30 cities and regions of Azerbaijan, attended the festival and demonstrated jams prepared from various fruits, vegetables, and even flowers, such as cherry, blackberry, strawberry, quince, walnut, apricot, rose, plum, violets, mint, rose hips, corn, wild green plum, cucumbers, tomatoes, carrots, yellow raspberries, aubergines, and melons. There are several competitions at the International Jam Festival, including “best presentation,” “best jam,” “variety of jam types,” “the most unusual jam”, "the greatest number of species jam", etc. The 5th V International Jam Festival was attended by teams from 25 foreign countries along with companies engaged in the industrial manufacture of jams from over 35 regions of Azerbaijan.

== Climate ==
Qabala has a humid subtropical climate that is mild with no dry season, constantly moist (year-round rainfall). Summers are hot and muggy with thunderstorms. Winters are mild with precipitation from mid-latitude cyclones. Seasonality is moderate. (Köppen-Geiger classification: Cfa). As with other parts of northern Azerbaijan near the Caucasus Mountains, rainfall is moderate to heavy throughout the year. The total annual precipitation is 795mm. According to the Holdridge life zones system of bioclimatic classification, Qabala is situated in or near the warm temperate thorn steppe biome. The mean annual temperature is 10.9 degrees Celsius (51.6 degrees Fahrenheit). Average monthly temperatures vary by 22.8 °C (41 °F). This indicates a continental type of climate.

== Ethnic composition ==
Ethnic groups in Qabala (2019)
1. Azerbaijanis (82.7%)
2. Lezgins (13.9%)
3. Udis (3.27%)
4. Others (0.18%)

The rayon has a population of 93,770 people, of whom 13,175 live in the regional town centre Qabala and 80,595 in villages. The density is estimated at 60.49 people per square kilometer. Life expectancy is 70 years. 73,235 residents of Qabala rayon are Azerbaijanis, 16 020 are Lezgins, 4,640 are Udi, 209 are Turks and 37 are of other nationalities.

== Population ==
According to the State Statistics Committee, as of 2018, the population of the city recorded 105,500 persons, which increased by 21,400 persons (about 25.4 percent) from 84,100 persons in 2000. Of the total population, 53,700 are men and 51,800 are women. More than 27,3 percent of the population (about 28,900 persons) consists of young people and teenagers aged 14–29.

The population of the district by the year (at the beginning of the year, thousand persons)
Region	2000	2001	2002	2003	2004	2005	2006	2007	2008	2009	2010	2011	2012	2013	2014	2015	2016	2017	2018	2019	2020	2021
Gabala region	84,1	85,3	86,3	87,3	88,3	89,3	90,2	91,5	92,7	93,5	94,5	95,6	97,2	98,6	100,0	101,5	103,0	104,4	105,5	106,6	107,8	108,7
urban population	11,3	11,3	11,4	11,4	11,4	11,6	31,2	31,6	31,8	32,0	32,3	32,6	33,1	33,6	34,0	34,6	35,1	35,5	35,8	36,2	36,6	36,8
rural population	72,8	74,0	74,9	75,9	76,9	77,7	59,0	59,9	60,9	61,5	62,2	63,0	64,1	65,0	66,0	66,9	67,9	68,9	69,7	70,4	71,2	71,9

== Sports ==
Qabala has a professional football team Gabala FC.

== Notable residents ==
- Polad Hashimov, a general for whom a street in central Gabala is named, was born in the district.
