= Synagogues in Azerbaijan =

There are ten synagogues in Azerbaijan, that proved places of worship for the three main Jewish communities. These communities comprise groups of mountain, Ashkenazi and Georgian Jewish peoples. The total number of Jews in Azerbaijan is 16,000. Of these, 11,000 are mountain Jews, about 6,000 live in Baku, 4,000 live in Guba and thousands in other cities. Ashkenazi Jews comprise 4,300 people; most of whom live in Baku and Sumgayit. Georgian Jews number approximately 700 people.

== Overview ==
Q. Zelmanovich claims that there are ten synagogues in Azerbaijan. Two of the synagogues are located in Baku, six synagogues are located in Guba, and two synagogues are located in Oguz:

"Synagogues have been built mainly in areas where Jews live. One of the synagogues in Baku was built in 2003 and another in 2012. Jews living in Azerbaijan, every day worship in the synagogue, celebrate their festivals, hold mourning ceremonies."

== Synagogues in Baku ==
=== Synagogue of Mountain Jews ===
The Synagogue of Mountain Jews has been functioning since 1945. During the Soviet era, after the end of the Second World War, mountain Jews were given an ancient building for religious needs in the center of the city. The condition of the building was very damaging, and those who worshiped here were suffering from unpleasantness. This situation continued until Azerbaijan gained independence. During the period of independence, repair and restoration works were started, the second floor of the synagogue was built, and favorable conditions were created for worshipers.

In connection with the reconstruction and capital rehabilitation works carried out, there was a need for a new synagogue for Mountain Jews and has been functioning in Baku in 2010. The opening ceremony of the new temple for the Mountain Jews was held on April 5, 2011. According to the architectural features and dimensions, officials, heads of religious confessions functioning in Azerbaijan, members of the Jewish community, as well as guests from Israel, Russia and other countries attended in opening ceremony of other Jewish temples’ synagogue not only in Azerbaijan but also in the region.

=== European and Georgian Jews Synagogue ===
The European and Georgian Jews Synagogue was opened on March 9, 2003. The temple was built based on the project of the architect Alexander Karberin. This place of worship is considered to be the first synagogue built in the Near East in 60–80 years.

This building, considered to be one of the largest synagogues in Europe, was erected instead of the old temple. After the Second World War, Soviet Power gave a one-storey building with ancient military warehouses to Georgian and European Jews for religious needs. Here men went down cold and damp basement for praying, and women prayed in the upper room. The balcony of the building was also given to women.

At present, in three-storied, new synagogue built from white stone has created comfortable conditions for believers. People from different religions and classes participated in the synagogue construction. The name of each person and organization that has been worked in the project is engraved on boards at the entrance of the temple. Not only Jewish organizations living abroad, but also Caucasian Muslims Office and the Bak] and Russian Orthodox Church in Azerbaijan have been closely participated in financing the construction.

== Synagogues in Quba ==
=== Gilaki Synagogue ===
The Gilaki Synagogue, located in the Red settlement in Guba region, was built by immigrants from the Gilan Province of Iran. The architect of the temple is Gilel Ben Haim. His name was engraved on the brick facade of the synagogue. It is clear from the inscription on the foundation stone that the temple was erected in 1896. There is also another board on the entrance door. And here is written another date – 1857. Perhaps this board was brought from the more ancient temple of the Jewish emigrants and was put on the door of the synagogue.

There are 12 windows in the synagogue building, according to the number of Israel branch. From historical sources it is known that earlier there was a spring near the synagogue. It is likely that the mosque built in Guba in the first half of the 19th century was a prototype for the temple of Gilaki, because the hexagonal dome was once a glass and illuminated the prayer room. Anological roofing is also available at the Guba mosque. In the past, there were no separate rooms for women in the Gilaki synagogue as in the other temples of mountain Jews. Women only came in here during the holidays and sat in the yard of the synagogue. At present, women are allowed to enter the temple during holidays.

=== Six Dome Synagogue ===
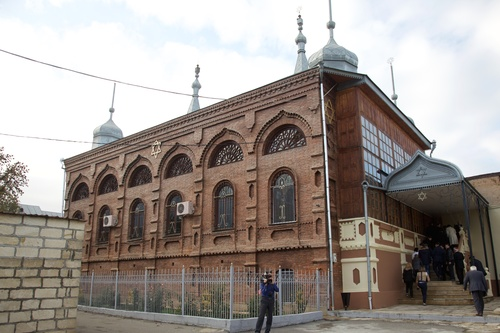
The Six Dome Synagogue in Quba

A synagogue in the Red Village of Guba District was built in 1888 by architect Gilel Ben Haim. Six dome (synagogue is also hexagonal) is a symbol of immigrating of the residents of Qilhat settlement here from the village of Galaduz during 6 days with the permission of Huseynali Khan of Guba. The temple has 14 main windows.

The synagogue, a large worship hall, is an ancient architectural monument built in the Eastern style. The section facing the wall of worship is called aron-kadus. Its height is 7 meters. The Holy book is kept in a wardrobe on the wall.

The windows are made of oak tree in shape of hexagonal star. The restoration of the synagogue began in 1995 and was completed in October 2000. There is also a 60-person worship hall and a kitchen for religious ceremonies at the temple's cellar.

== Synagogues in Oğuz ==
=== Ashaghi Mahalla Synagogue ===
Ashaghi Mahalla Synagogue, also known as the Synagogue of the Upper Quarter, in Oguz city was built in 1849. This synagogue was used as a tobacco and furniture warehouse during the Soviet era. The synagogue began to be repaired by local Jews in 1992 and ended in 1994.

=== Yukhari Mahalla Synagogue ===
Yukhari Mahalla Synagogue, also known as the Synagogue of the Lower Quarter, located at Oguz city was built in 1897 by helping and heading of Ravvin Barukh. In the Soviet era, this synagogue was also closed as other places of worship, and later used as a warehouse.

In October 2004, the synagogue was begun to repaired by local Jews living in Oguz, and the renovation was completed in 2006. The synagogue is now used as a temple. On the Friday and Saturday, the Jews worship freely.

== List ==
Name of synagogue	Location	Completed	Notes
Synagogue of the Ashkenazi Jews	Baku	2003	
Synagogue of the Mountain Jews	Baku	2011	
Six Dome Synagogue	Quba	1888	
Gilaki Synagogue	Quba	1896	
Qusar Synagogue	Quba		
Garcai Synagogue	Quba	1906	
Synagogue of the Upper Quarter	Oğuz	1849	
Synagogue of the Lower Quarter	Oğuz	1897	

== See also ==
- History of the Jews in Azerbaijan
