= Ohr Avner Chabad Day School =

Chabad school network

Ohr Avner Chabad Day School refers to a network of Jewish day schools founded and supported by Israeli businessman Lev Leviev, under the auspices of the Chabad Lubavitch movement, located in the areas of the former Soviet Union.

The schools operated by this network include:

- Ohr Avner Chabad Day School (Baku)
- Ohr Avner Chabad Day School (Tashkent)
- Ohr Avner Chabad Day School (Volgograd)

== See also ==
- Ohr Avner Foundation
