= The Children's Aid Bureau =

Azerbaijani NGO

- Uşaqlara Yardım Bürosu
- Formation: September 1918; 108 years ago
- Founded at: Azerbaijan Democratic Republic
- Dissolved: April 27, 1920; 106 years ago
- Type: NGO
- Legal status: charity, foundation
- Purpose: humanitarian
- Headquarters: Baku
- Location: Azerbaijan
- Board of directors: Yevsey Gindes

The Children's Aid Bureau was a non-governmental charitable organization that operated during the governance of Azerbaijani Democratic Republic. The organization was created to help orphaned children after the March genocide, as well as other needy children living in the country.

The bureau had several children's shelters at its disposal. In addition to the Azerbaijan Democratic Republic, millionaire philanthropists living in the country supported their activities.

After the April occupation, the activities of the Children's Aid Bureau were suspended.

== History ==
=== Creation ===
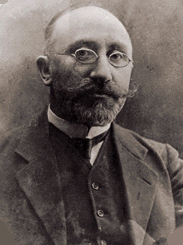
Yevsey Gindes, Minister of Public Health of the Democratic Republic of Azerbaijan

In September 1918, the Children's Aid Bureau was established under the Central Committee of Internal Affairs and it was the largest charitable organization operating at that time to help children left orphans after the March genocide, as well as victims of the genocide. The chairman of the bureau was Yevsey Gindes, and the deputy was Liza Mukhtarova.

A number of millionaires also supported the operation of the bureau and the construction of its buildings. Among them were Haji Zeynalabdin Taghiyev, Agha Musa Naghiyev, Shamsi Asadullayev. In addition to them, individual citizens also gave donations to the office. These philanthropists include Isabey Sadikhbeyov, Hanifa Zeynalabdin oglu Taghiyev, Chairman of the Muslim Charitable Society Gasim Gasimov, Taghi Naghiyev, Zeynab Khanum Salimkhanova and others.

=== Activity ===
In the early days of its operation, the bureau, whose main purpose was to help orphaned children living in the streets, mainly tried to organize shelters. However, difficulties arose due to lack of funds. Therefore, the relevant state structures appealed to the population to support the work of the bureau. The following was written in the Azerbaijan newspaper published at that time:

Even the most ordinary toy given to children is of great importance... These children had left society and would return to society, therefore they had full rights to the help and assistance by society...

Initially, the bureau had 5 shelters that could accommodate up to a thousand children. One of the shelters was the "Children's House", which was opened in December with the help of Liza Mukhtarova. This shelter was opened on the basis of the "Babies' House", which operated from 1895 to 1917. At that time, the chairman was Dr. Gindes, and the financier was Haji Zeynalabdin Taghiyev. H.Z. Taghiyev was later elected an honorary member of the bureau. The construction of the "Babies' House" was started in 1898. However, due to lack of funds, construction remained unfinished. Later, Agamusa Nagiyev and Shamsi Asadullayev allocated money for the construction of the shelter and completed it. This 19 th century building was located at the intersection of Suleyman Rustam and Mikayil Rafili streets.

Liza Mukhtarova, who did not have her own children, was actively involved in education and educational activities. She organized a boarding house in her private property (now Saadat Palace) and took care of girls from poor families who lost their parents.

In order to expand the work, on November 26, 1918, a large meeting of members of local public and national organizations was held. A collegial body was created here, members were elected from all national, public and charitable organizations. A. Leontovich, Y. Gindes, G. Bron from the Central House Committee, Krylova and engineer Krivoshein from the Russian Charity Society, Y. Varshavsky from the Jewish National Committee, Liza Mukhtarova from the Muslim Charity Society, Vasilyevskaya from the Muslim shelter, Radzinskaya from the "Babies' House", Koritskaya from "Children's House" and others were elected members of the bureau. And Dr. Allahverdiyev undertook the protection of children's health.

The Ministry of Social Protection, headed by Musa Bey Rafiyev, financed the food department. Deputy Minister Rustam Khan Khoyski helped the Muslim population living in the mountainous part of Baku, Surakhani, Sabunchu, and Ramana, especially women who could not come to the food stations, by opening distribution points that carried food. Lunch was mostly free or for a penny or two.

The bureau provided assistance to a Muslim children's shelter. Charity events were also held: cheap white bread was baked, and the profits from its sale were donated to orphanages, regardless of nationality. During the summer, the Bureau rented the "Nina" barge and helped 130 children suffering from tuberculosis to improve their health. During the bedbug epidemic in Baku at the end of 1918-beginning of 1919, the Bureau opened day homes for children in the working-class districts of the city. Children were provided with food in those houses from 8:00 to 18:00, and medical assistance was given to them when they fell ill.

After the April occupation, the activities of the Children's Aid Bureau were suspended.
