= Jews of Azerbaijan (organization) =

Jewish cultural organization in Azerbaijan

Jews of Azerbaijan is a new Jewish cultural organization which was registered at Azerbaijan State Committee for Religious Affairs on May 17, 2002. One of the main goals of the organization has been developing ties with all Jewish communities of Azerbaijan, improvement of and raising awareness of local Jews on religious and secular studies.

On April 25, 2003, a new school Ohr Avner Chabad Day School (Baku) was registered at the Ministry of Justice of Azerbaijan by the above-mentioned organization. On the same day, the Ministry of Education of Azerbaijan issued a teaching license to the new school.

The scope of activities of Jews of Azerbaijan include:

- Holding events related to religious holidays
- Providing financial help to orphanages, retirement homes for elderly, the poor
- Holding religious conferences, debates, seminars
- Assignment and sending representatives of Jewish youth to religious schools
- Cultural awareness activities
- Functional support to educational complex Ohr Avner Chabad Day School (Baku)

== See also ==
- Azerbaijani Jews
- Mountain Jews
- Qırmızı Qəsəbə
