= RAD =

RAD or Rad may refer to:

== Arts, entertainment and media ==
- Rad (film), a 1986 American sports film
- Rad (character), a villain in AC Comics's "Femforce"
- Rad Spencer, fictional character in the Bionic Commando video game series
- Bradley "Rad" White, fictional character in the Transformers Unicron Trilogy
- Rad (My-Otome), a fictional manga character
- Rad (video game), 2019
- Robot Alchemic Drive, a video game
- Rad (journal), a Croatian academic journal

== Businesses and organisations ==
- Rad Aviation, a defunct British aircraft manufacturer
- Rad Bar, a music venue in Wollongong, Australia
- RAD Group, a number of independent companies in the networking and telecommunications industry
  - RAD Data Communications, an Israeli networking equipment manufacturer
- RAD Game Tools, a video game developer
- Reich Labour Service (Reichsarbeitsdienst), a paramilitary organization in Nazi Germany
- Rezvani Automotive Designs, American performance car manufacturer
- Rite Aid, New York Stock Exchange stock symbol RAD
- Royal Academy of Dance, British examination board for dance education and training
- Royal Association for Deaf people, British charity

== People ==
=== Given name or nickname ===
- Rad Dougall (Robert Anthony Dougall, born 1951), South African racing driver
- Rad Hourani (born 1982), Canadian fashion designer and artist
- Rad Kortenhorst (Leonardus Gerardus Kortenhorst, 1886–1963), Dutch politician
- Rad Martinez (born 1978), American mixed martial artist
- Sydney Valpy Radley-Walters (1920–2015), nicknamed Rad, Canadian Army officer
- Rad Radford, a ring name of American wrestler Louis Mucciolo Jr. (1971–1998)

=== Surname ===
- Jahon Rad (born 2001), American soccer player, twin brother of Kaveh Rad
- Jovana Rad (born 1987), Serbian basketball player
- Kaveh Rad (born 2001), American soccer player, twin brother of Jahon Rad
- Taras Rad (born 1999), Ukrainian Paralympic cross-country skier and biathlete

== Places ==
- Rád, a village in Pest county, Hungary
- Rad (village), in Trebišov District, Slovakia
- Radnorshire, historic county in Wales
- Allegheny Regional Asset District, a special purpose unit of local government in Pennsylvania, U.S.

== Science and technology ==
- Radian, symbol rad, a unit of angle
- Rad (radiation unit), a unit of absorbed radiation dose
- Radiation assessment detector, a scientific instrument on board the Curiosity rover
- Radical of an integer, rad (x), in number theory
- Rapid application development, a software development approach
- Reactive attachment disorder, an emotional disorder
- Reflex anal dilation, the reflexive dilation of the human anus
- Relative abundance distribution, a measure of biodiversity
- Restriction site associated DNA markers, a type of genetic marker
- Right axis deviation, a heart condition
- .rad file format, for Radiance (software)

== Other uses ==
- Rad (rune), an Anglo-Saxon rune
- Rade language, ISO 639-3 language code rad
- Radley railway station, England, station code RAD
- Rental Assistance Demonstration, an American federal public housing program
- Researchers Alliance for Development, a World Bank multidisciplinary network of researchers
- Rules for Archival Description, the Canadian archival descriptive standard
- FK Rad, a Serbian football club

== See also ==
- Radiator, a heat exchanger
- Gerhard von Rad (1901–1971), German theologian
