= Six Dome Synagogue =

Former synagogue, now museum, in Quba, Azerbaijan

- Azerbaijani: Altı günbəz sinaqoqu
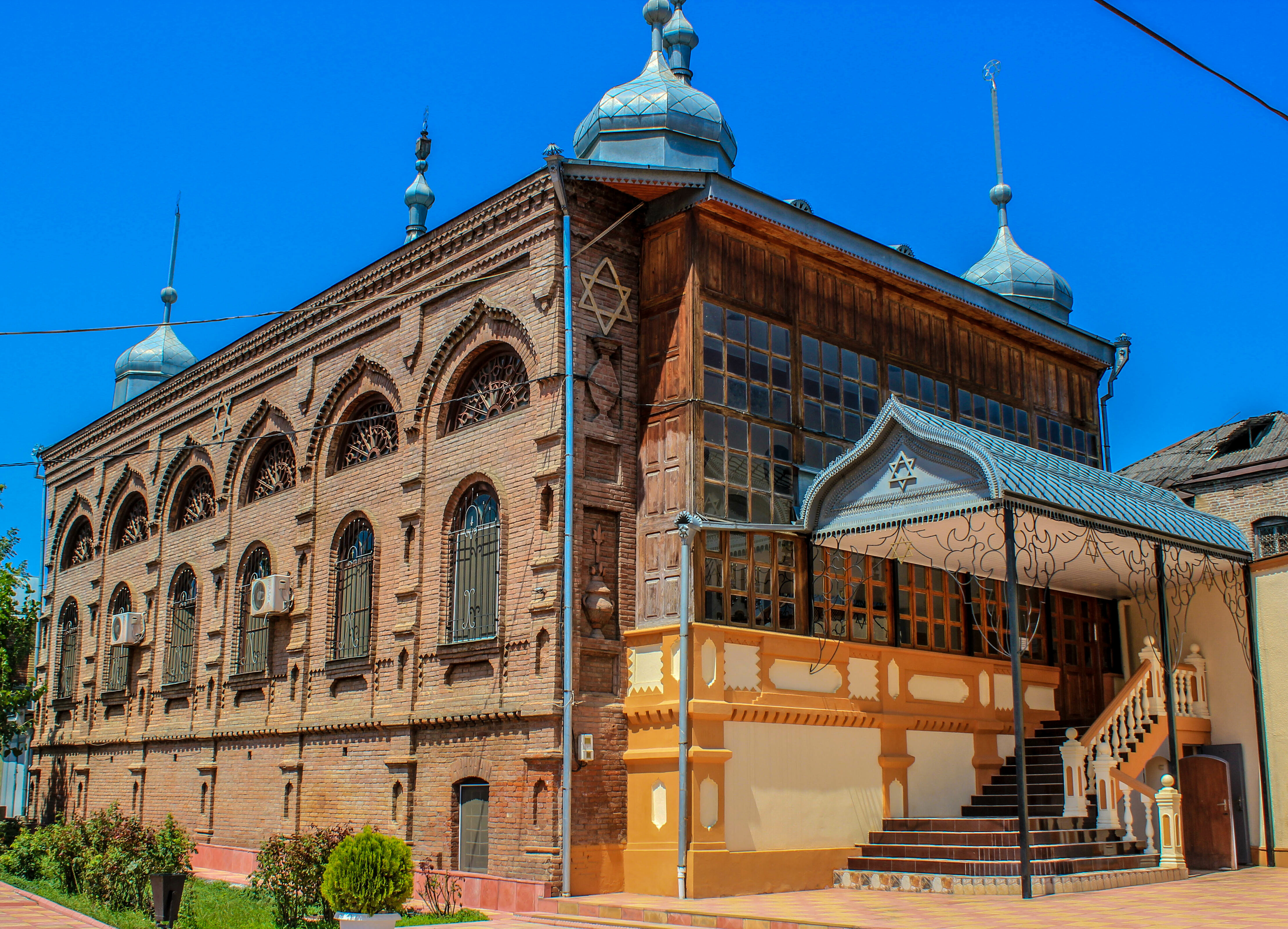

- Location of the former synagogue, now museum, in Azerbaijan

Religion
- Affiliation: Judaism
- Ecclesiastical or organisational status: Synagogue; Jewish museum
- Status: Active (as a synagogue); Repurposed (as a museum)

Location
- Location: Gyrmyzy Gasaba, Quba District
- Country: Azerbaijan
- Coordinates: 41°21′59″N 48°30′27″E

Architecture
- Architect: Gilel Ben Haim
- Type: Synagogue architecture
- Style: Moorish Revival
- Completed: 1888
- Dome: Six
- Location in Gyrmyzy Gasaba

The Six Dome Synagogue (Azerbaijani: Altı günbəz sinaqoqu, lit. 'Alti Gumbaz Synagogue') is a former Jewish synagogue and now landmark Jewish history museum, located in the village of Gyrmyzy Gasaba (or Red Village), of Quba district, Azerbaijan. The former synagogue building was erected at the end of the nineteenth century and is similar in design to a synagogue in Istanbul. The synagogue was the center of religious education.

Red Village, situated in the northeast of Azerbaijan, close to the border with Russia, is believed to be the world's only all-Jewish village outside of Israel and the United States, and the last surviving shtetl.

== History ==
The hexagonal synagogue is located in the Qırmızı Qəsəbə of Quba District, designed by the architect Gilel Ben Haim, completed in 1888. The architecture of the building has an oriental, Moorish Revival style. It is the symbol of six-day migration of residents of the Gilgat village to the Red Village within 6 days. The building has 14 main windows. The height of the wall of the building is 7 meters.

For a long time, the building was used as a warehouse, then a sewing workshop. After the restoration of the independence of Republic in 1991, the prayer house was returned to the residents. Restoration work began in 1995 with the initiative of Mardakhai Abramov and Semyon Nisanov who were representatives of Qırmızı Qəsəbə, continued until October 1995. The celebrations for the revival of the six-dome synagogue in Qırmızı Qəsəbə were held on October 11, 2001. Although the restoration was first completed in 2005.

In 2019, it was reported that the synagogue was in current use.

== Gallery ==
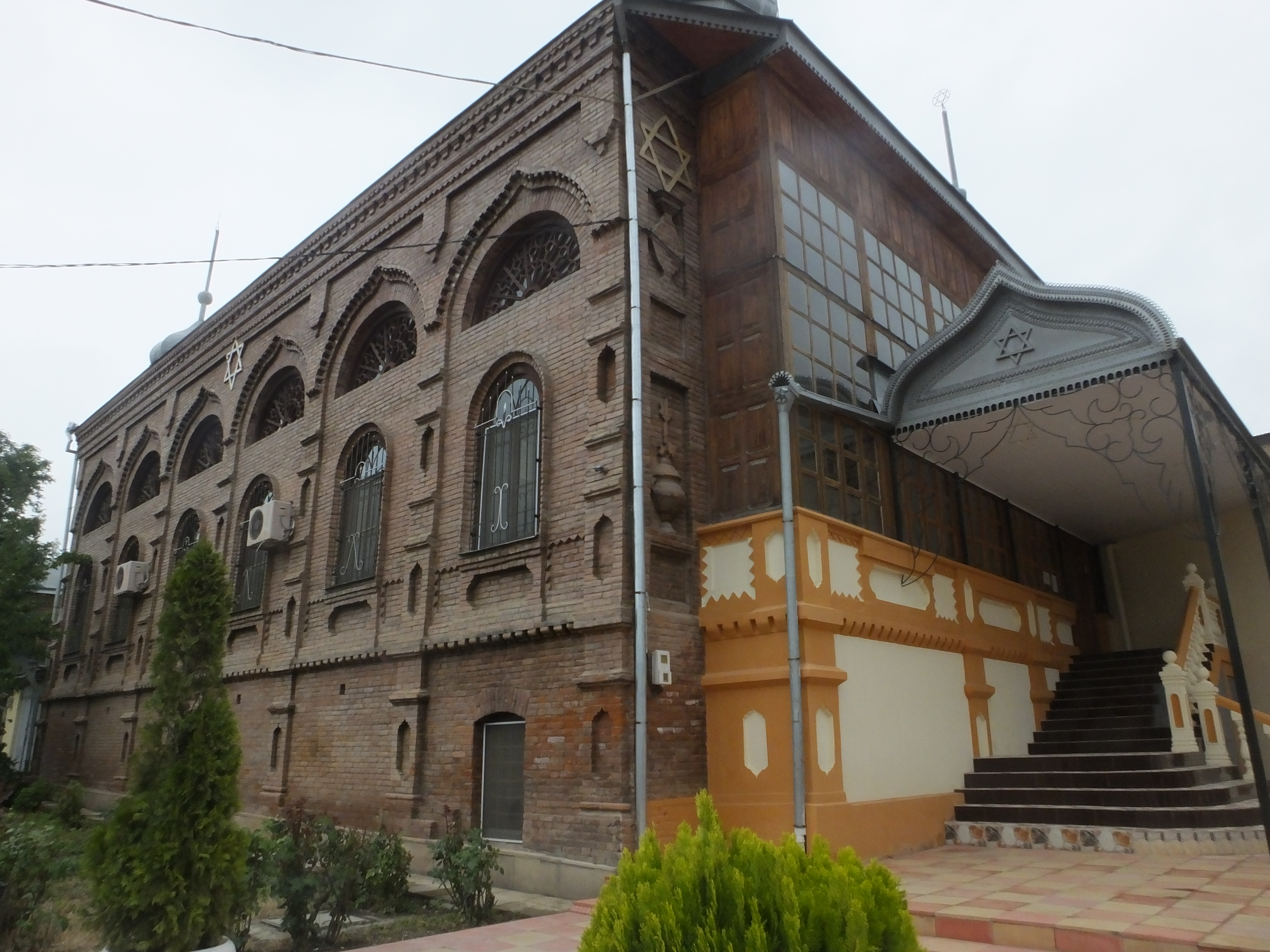

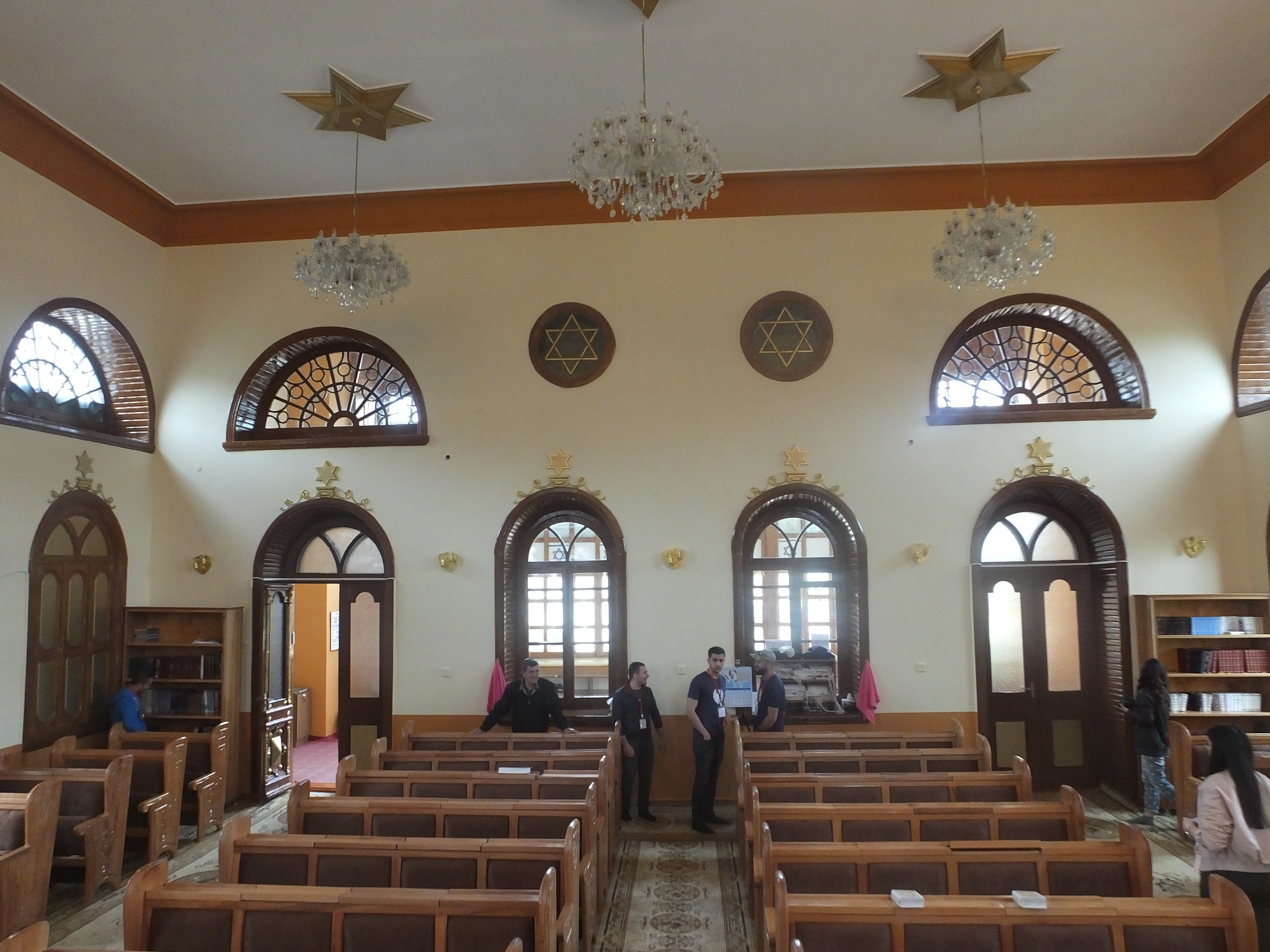

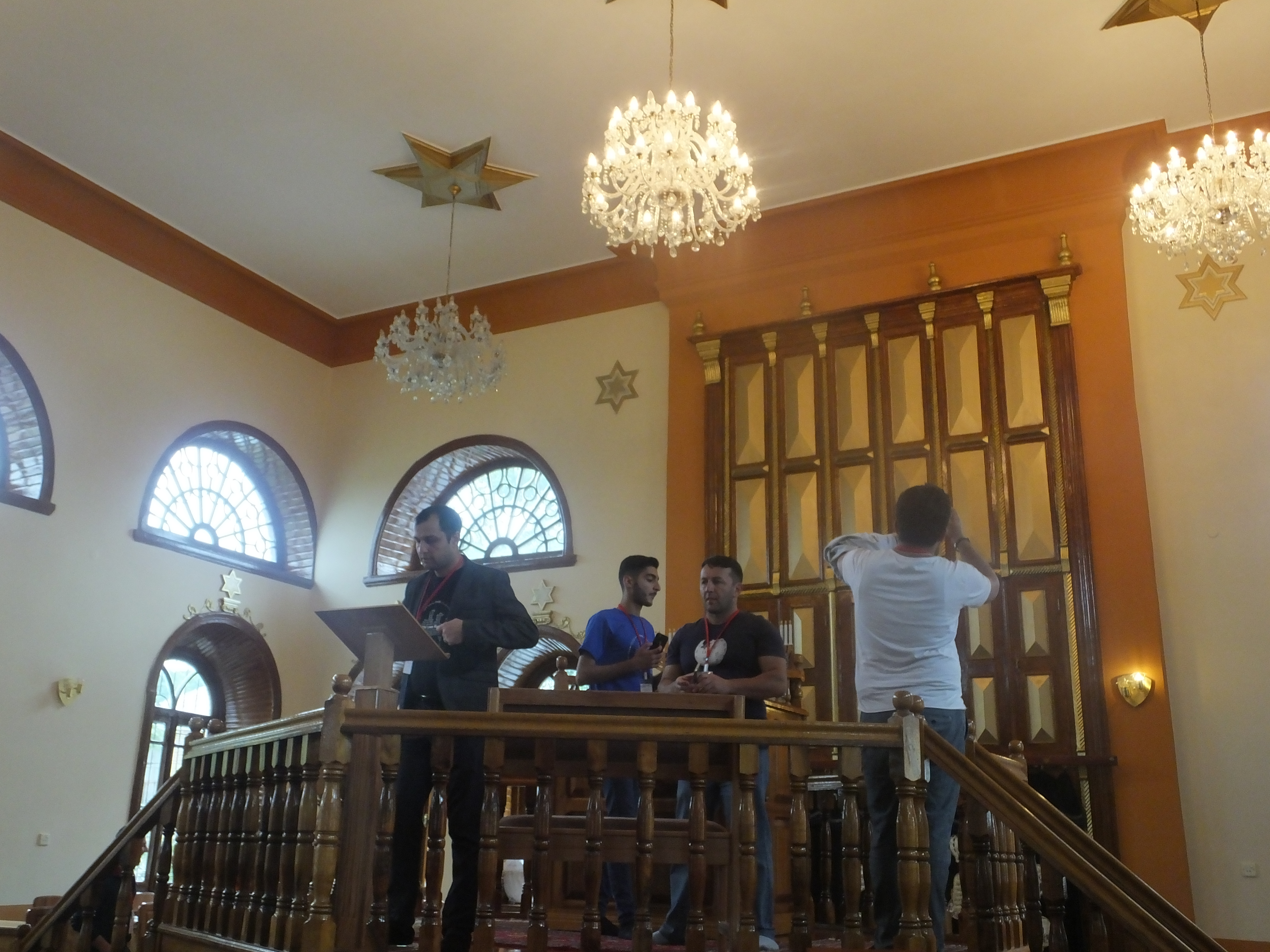

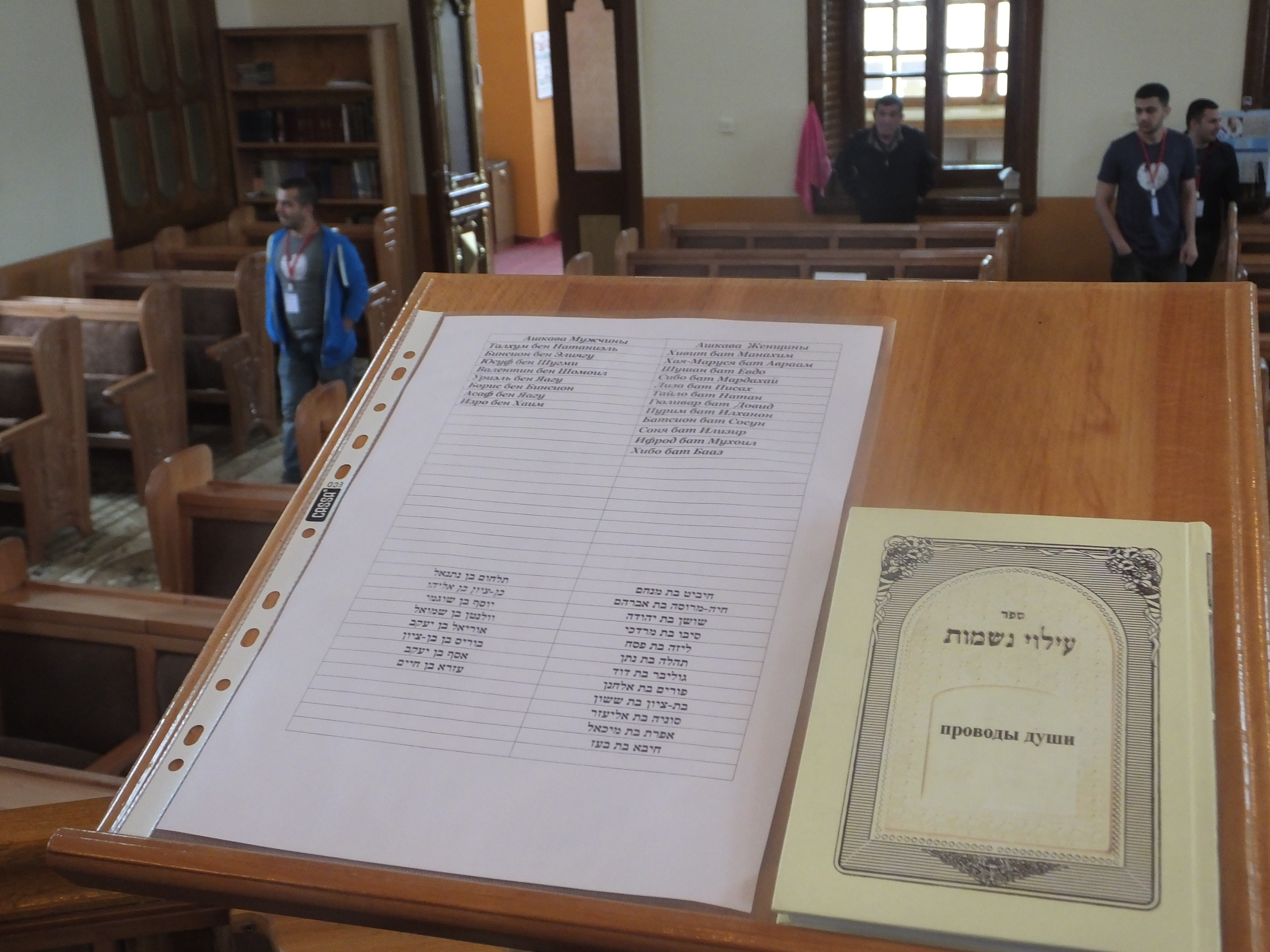

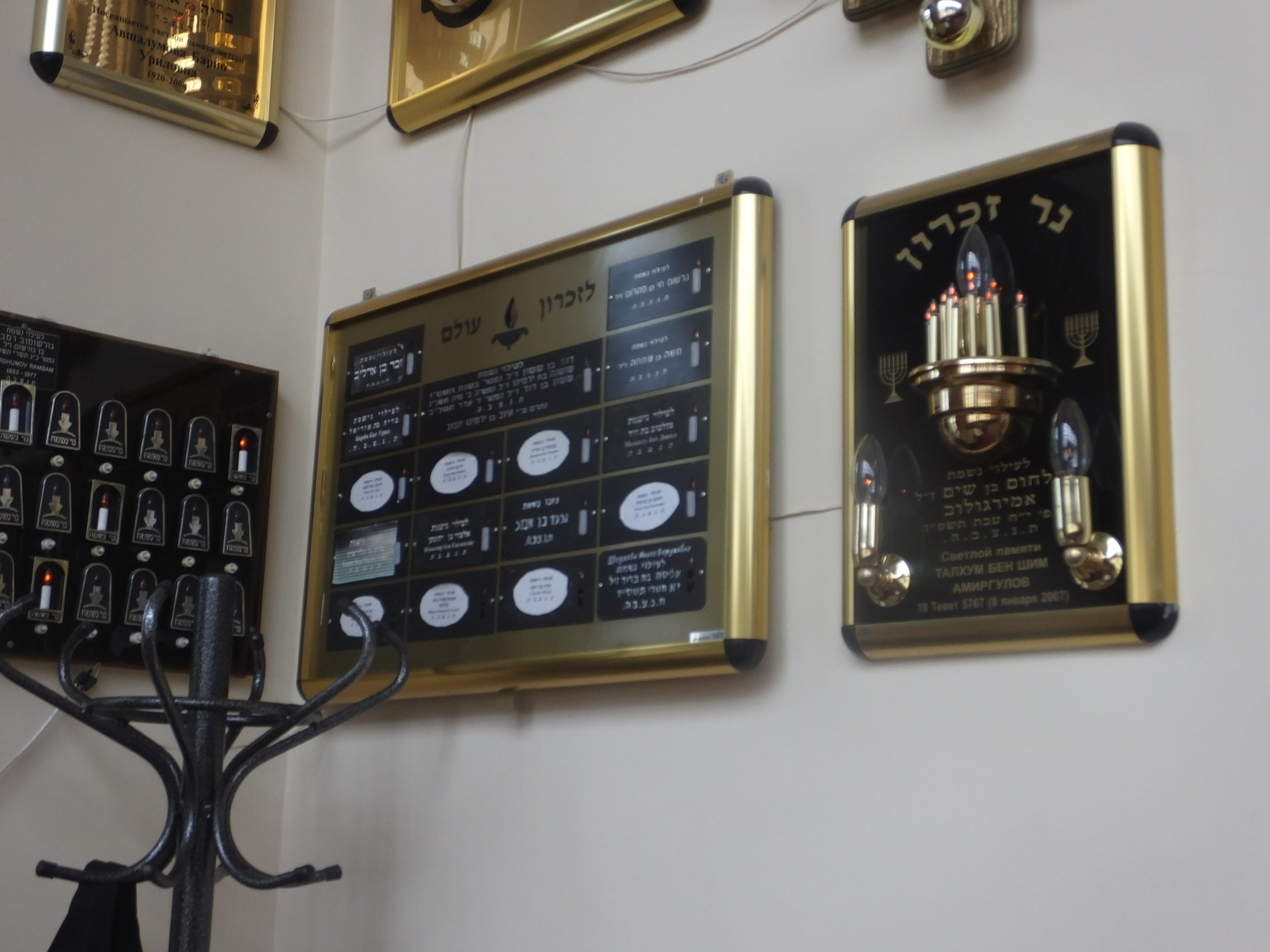

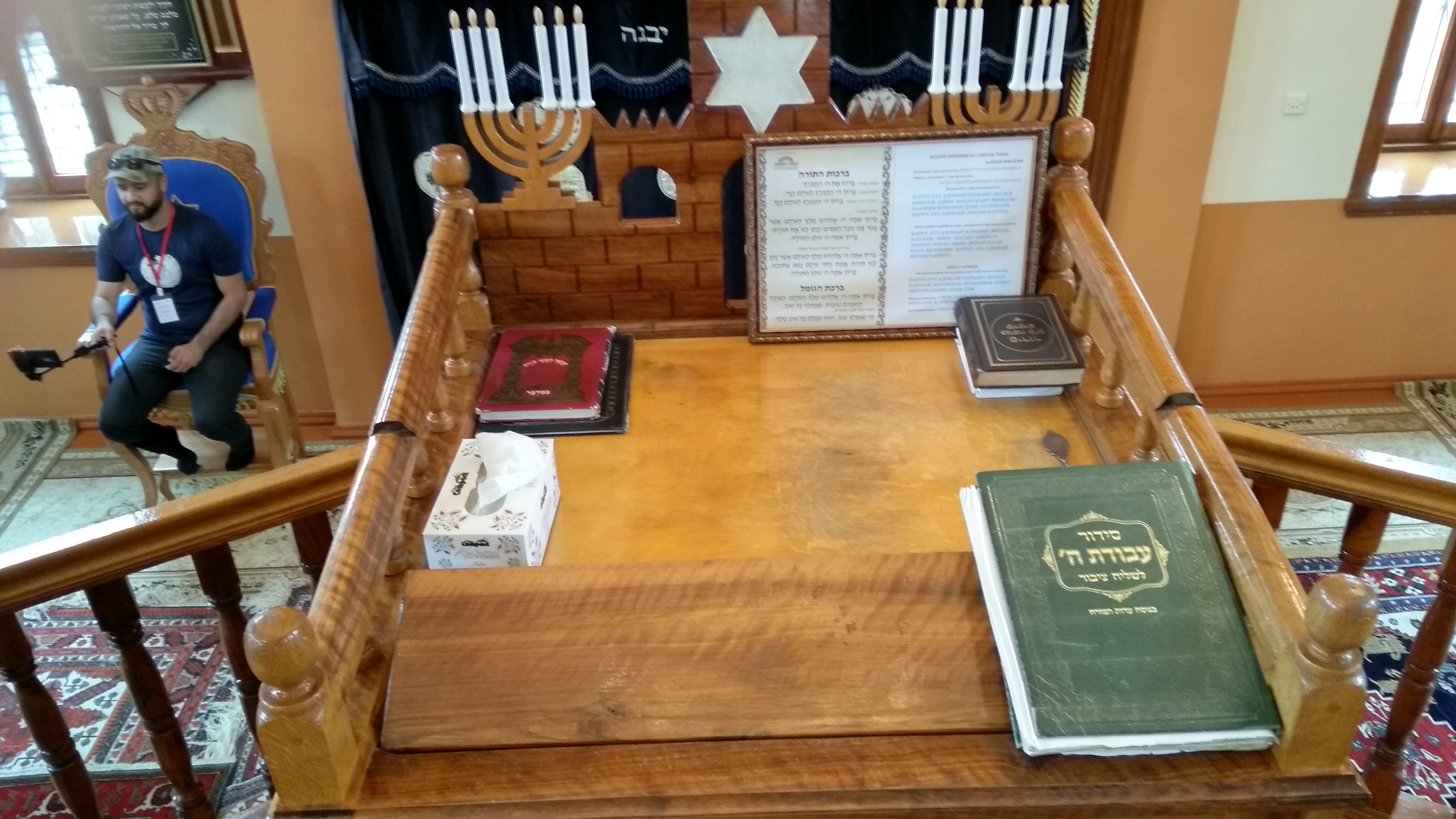

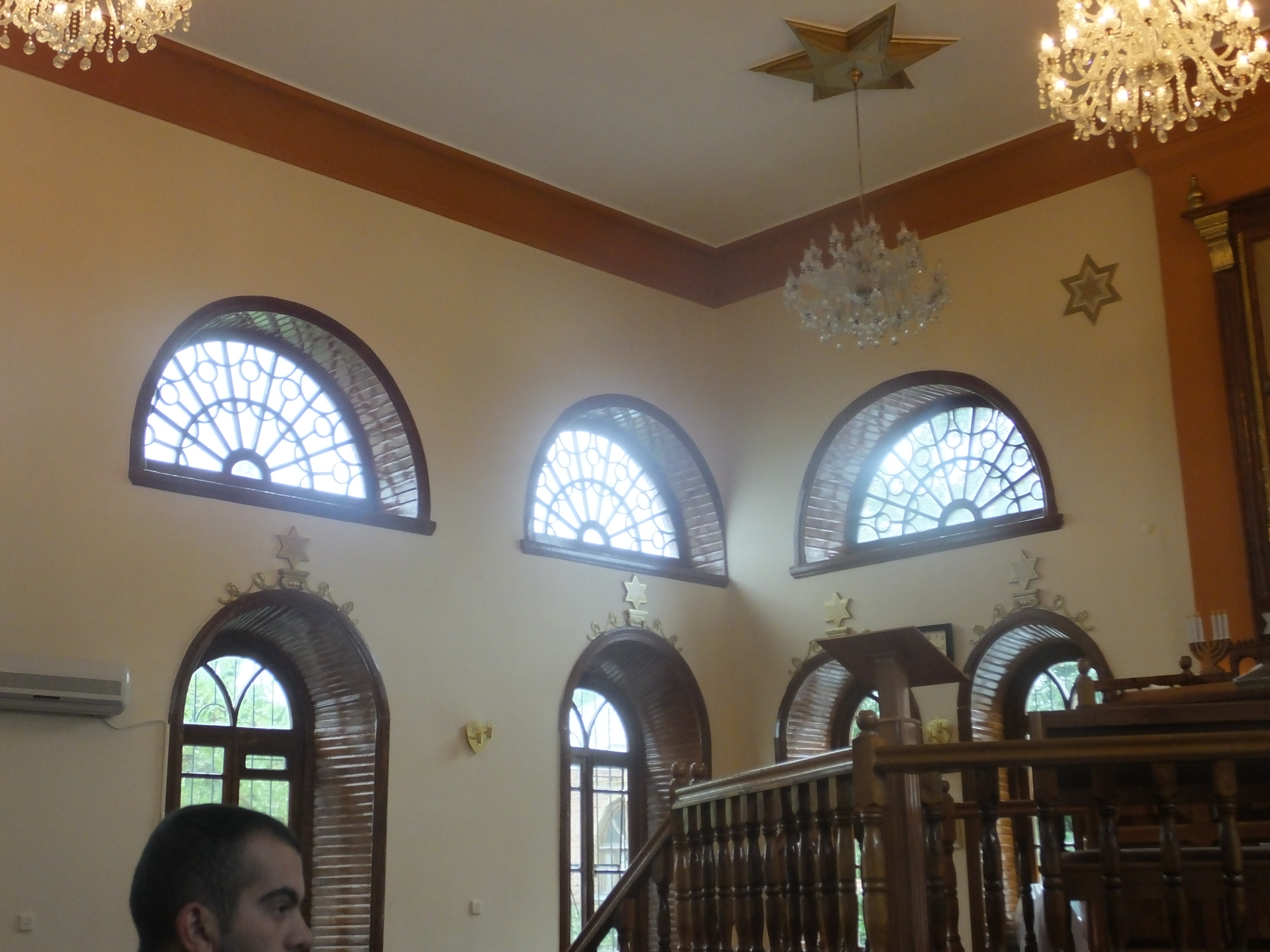

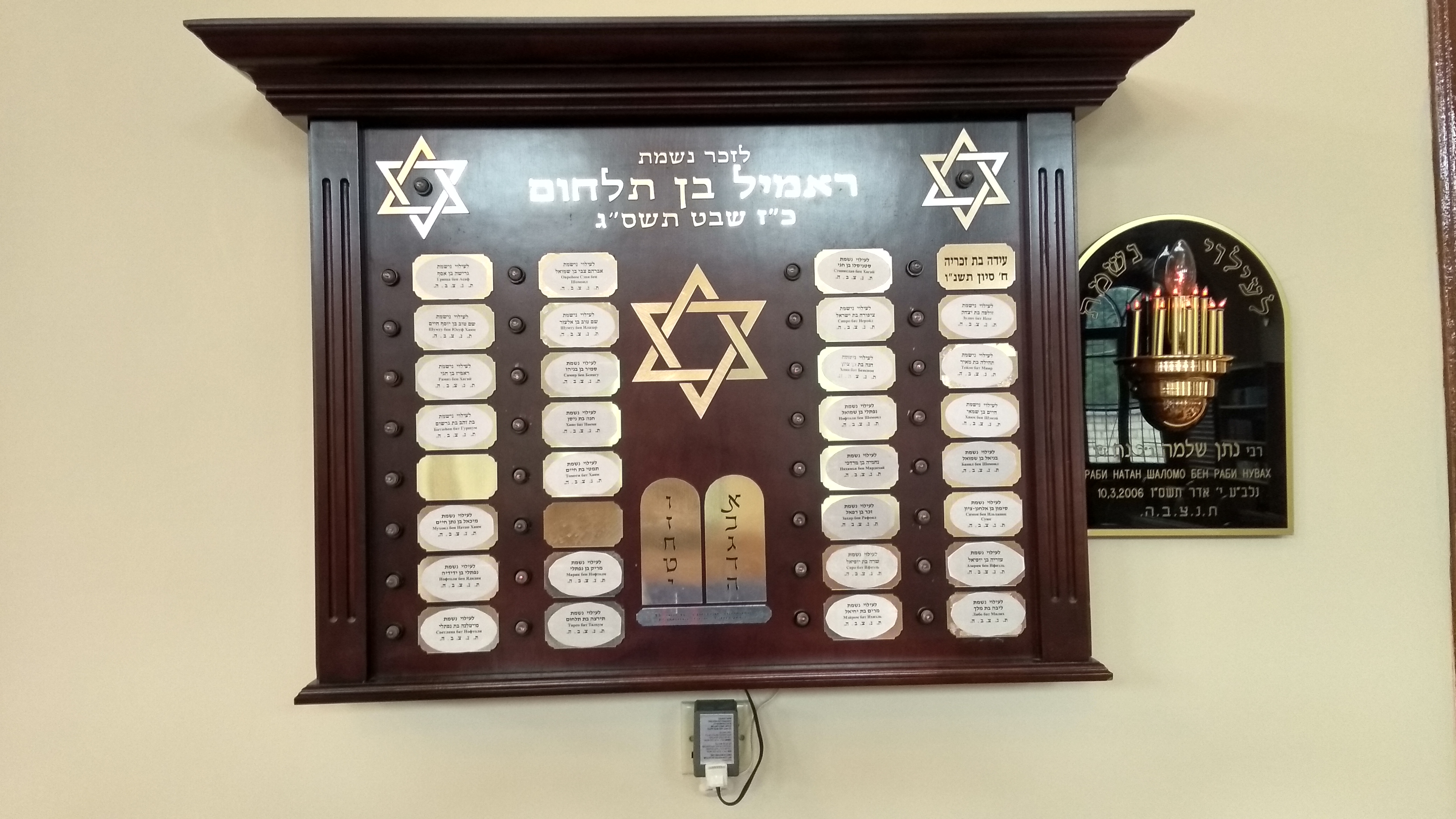

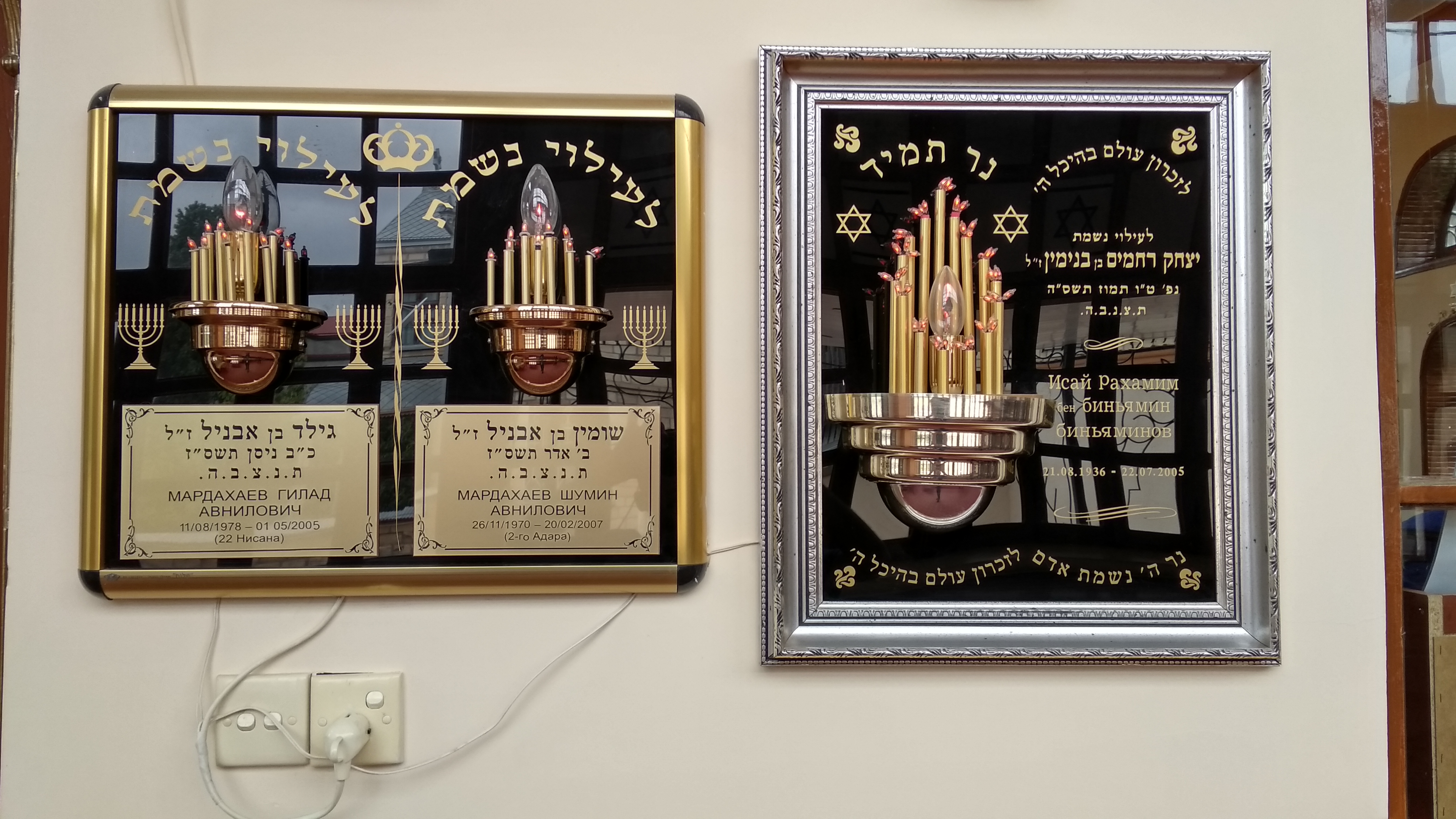

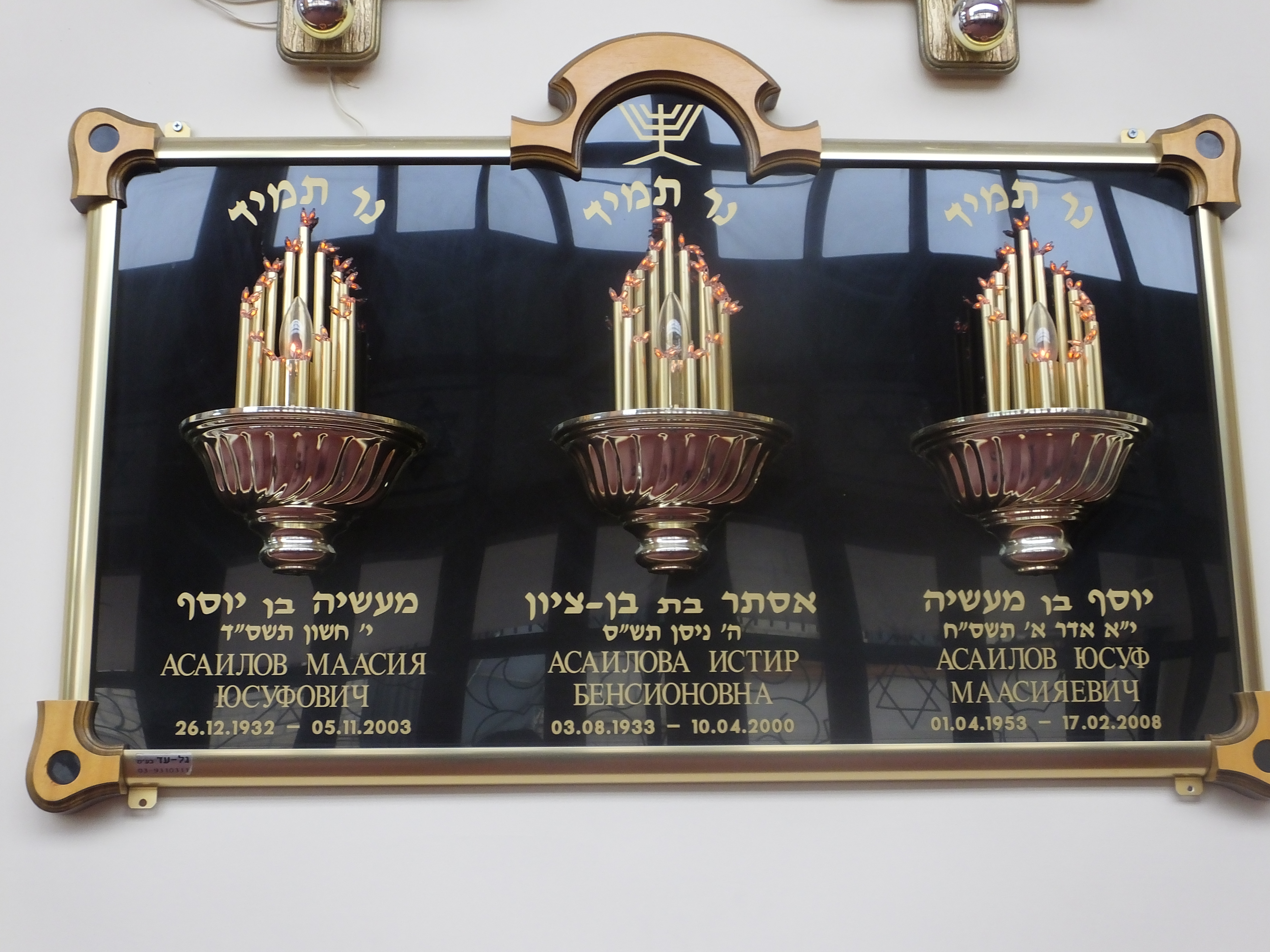

== See also ==
- History of the Jews in Azerbaijan
- List of museums in Azerbaijan
- List of synagogues in Azerbaijan
- Synagogues in Azerbaijan
