= Yevda Abramov =

Azerbaijani politician (1948–2019)

Member of the Azerbaijan Parliament for Quba Rayon
- In office 6 November 2005 – 6 December 2019
- Preceded by: New constituency

Personal details
- Born: 12 June 1948 Gyrmyzy Gasaba, Quba District, Azerbaijan SSR, Soviet Union
- Died: 6 December 2019 (aged 71) Baku, Azerbaijan
- Party: New Azerbaijan Party
- Education: Azerbaijan State Pedagogical Institute
- Occupation: Teacher
- Committees: Standing Commission of the Milli Mejlis (Parliament) on Human Rights; Azerbaijan-Israel working group on interparliamentary relations; Azerbaijan-Argentine, Azerbaijan-Cuba, and Azerbaijan-Russia working groups on interparliamentary relations

Yevda Sasunovich Abramov (Azerbaijani: Yevda Sasunoviç Abramov; 12 June 1948 – 6 December 2019) was an Azerbaijani politician. He served as a Member of the National Assembly of Azerbaijan from 2005 until his death in 2019. and Deputy chairman of Azerbaijani National Assembly's Committee on Human Rights.

Abramov was a Mountain Jew, representing part of the Azerbaijani Jewish community.

== Life ==
Yevda Abramov was born in the village of Krasnaya Sloboda of Quba Rayon on June 12, 1948. He came from the Cohen family, originally hailing from Iran. His father was a former leader and spiritual guide of the Jewish community of Azerbaijan. His family's known 750-year-old history traces back to Shemakha, about 250 km north-west of Baku. In 1902, when an earthquake struck the town, many surviving Jews left for Quba. His father left to fight in World War II against Nazi Germany.

Yevda Abramov graduated from the History faculty of Azerbaijan State Pedagogical Institute. He spoke Azeri, Turkish, Russian, and Persian fluently.

From 1971, he was a teacher and the deputy director at a secondary school in Quba region, and from 1987, he was the chairman of the Executive Committee and secondary school teacher in Krasnaya Sloboda, a Jewish town in Quba Rayon.

In 2000, he was elected the chairman of municipality in Krasnaya Sloboda. From 1986 until 1999, he was in regional politics before he joined the ruling authoritarian New Azerbaijan Party.

On 6 November 2005, he was elected as Member of Parliament from the Quba-Qusar constituency No. 53. In parliament, he served as deputy chair of the Standing Commission of the so-called Milli Mejlis on Human Rights as well as the head of the Azerbaijan-Israel Working Group on Interparliamentary Relations and the Azerbaijan-Argentina, Azerbaijan-Cuba and Azerbaijan-Russia Working Groups on Interparliamentary Relations.

Yevda Abramov was married, with four children. Three of his children live in Israel and one of his sons serves as an officer in the IDF.

Abramov died in Baku on 6 December 2019 at the age of 71.
