= Lev Leviev =

Lev Leviev may refer to:

- Lev Avnerovich Leviev (born 1956), Israeli businessman and philanthropist
- Lev Binzumovich Leviev (born 1984), Russian–Israeli Internet entrepreneur and investor

== See also ==
- Lev (given name)
- Leviev (surname)
