= Jewish National Council (Azerbaijan) =

The Jewish National Council (Azerbaijani: Yəhudi Milli Şurası) was an organization formed by Jews living in the country during the Azerbaijan Democratic Republic (1918–1920).

== History ==
It was established in December 1917 after the disintegration of the Russian Empire. In October 1918, with the permission of the governor of Baku, he officially began to work.

The council, which represented various religious and political Jewish groups, was involved in cultural, educational, religious, and charitable activities.

== Activity ==
Jewish primary and high schools with a monthly budget of 150,000 rubles (up to 800 students), evening courses and a library for the elderly, a cheap canteen, a committee to help Jews affected by looting during the 1918 March Days by Armenian-Dashnak and Bolshevik militias, a petty trader and the Jewish Debt and Savings Association, which assisted the artisans, was at the disposal of the council. The council's budget was formed from income tax collected from members of the Jewish community. According to the decision of the National Council of Azerbaijan dated November 19, 1918, in accordance with the principle of national representation, there should have been a Jewish deputy in the Parliament of the Azerbaijan Democratic Republic. The council determined the identity of this deputy. The chairman of the council, M.A.Gukhman, was also a member of the Azerbaijani parliament.

== See also ==
- Azerbaijani National Council
- History of the Jews in Azerbaijan
