= Synagogue of the Ashkenazi Jews in Baku =

Synagogue in Baku, Azerbaijan

Synagogue of the Ashkenazi and georgian Jews in Baku
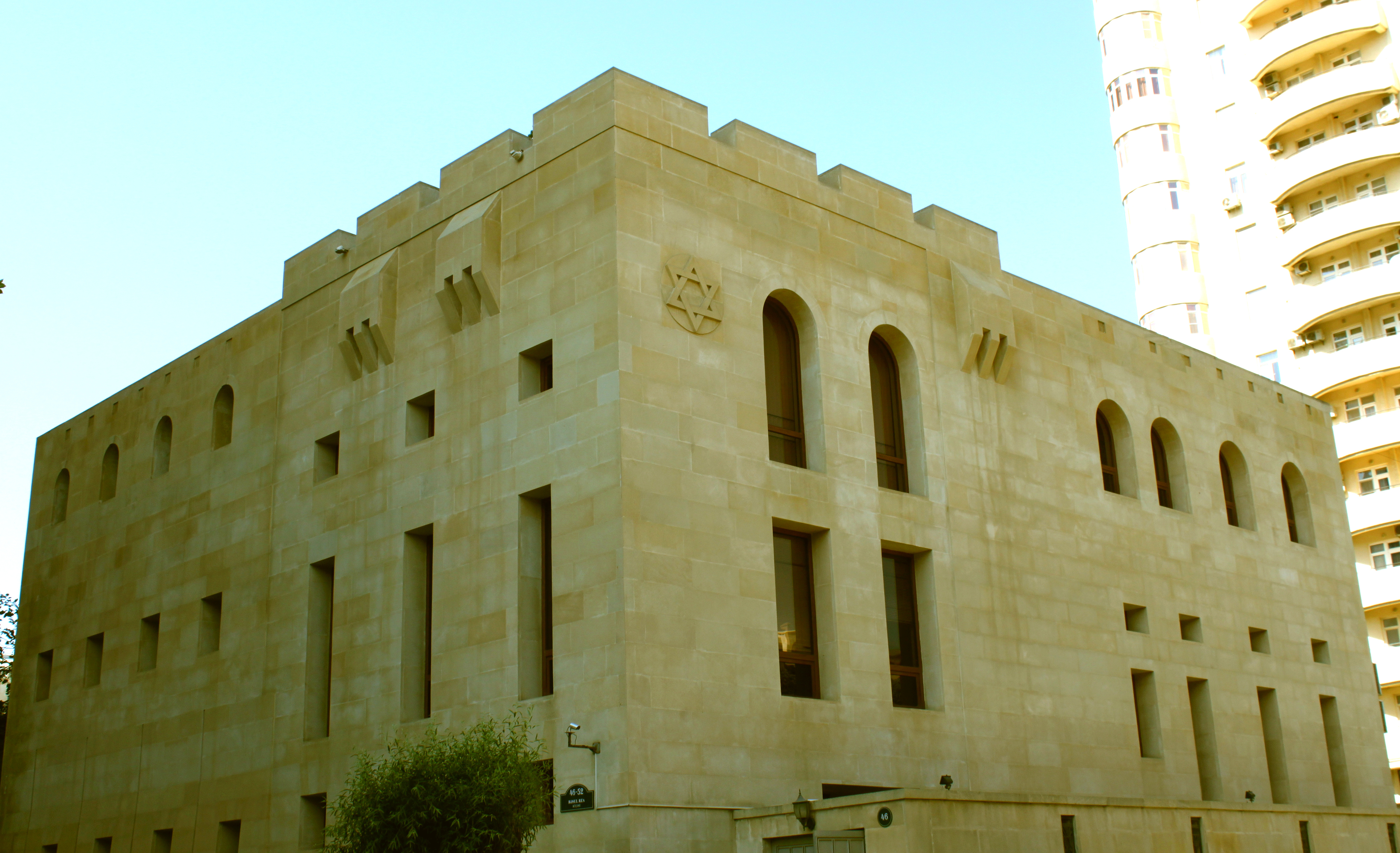

- Location in Azerbaijan

Religion
- Affiliation: Judaism
- Rite: Nusach Ashkenaz
- Ecclesiastical or organizational status: Synagogue
- Status: Active

Location
- Location: 171 Dilara Aliyeva Street, Baku
- Country: Azerbaijan
- Interactive map of Synagogue of the Ashkenazi and georgian Jews in Baku
- Coordinates: 40°22′32″N 49°50′16″E

Architecture
- Architect: Alexander Harber (2003)
- Type: Synagogue architecture
- Style: Jerusalem architecture
- Completed: 1946 (Korganov); 2003 (Dilara Aliyeva)
- Materials: White stone

Synagogue of the Ashkenazi Jews in Baku is a synagogue, located at 171 Dilara Aliyeva Street, in Baku, Azerbaijan. The synagogue caters for Ashkenazi and Georgian Jews.

== History ==
In 1946, a building of former depot of the civil defense on the corner of Korganov (now Rasul Rza) and Pervomayskaya (now Dilara Aliyeva) Streets in a semi-basement place was allocated for the present synagogue. The building was repaired and re-equipped for needs of communities together with a community of Georgian Jews of Azerbaijan. Two praying halls were built there: a big one for the Ashkenazi Jews and a small one for Georgian Jews. Means were collected in the result of voluntary donations donated by Azerbaijani Jews. In 2002, it was decided to build a new building for the synagogue. Opening of the new synagogue was held on March 9, 2003.

At present, Rabbi Shneor Segal, leader of Alliance of Rabbis in Islamic States is the Chief Rabbi of the synagogue and the Ashkenazi community.
