= Ohr Avner Chabad Day School (Volgograd) =

Chabad school

Ohr Avner Chabad Day School (or Jewish Day School Ohr Avner) is a Jewish day school in Volgograd, Russia, and supported by the Ohr Avner Foundation. It opened in 2000 with 55 students, occupying premises on the second floor of a municipal school. In 2004 it moved to a new building leased from the city administration, and in 2005 it has some 155 students.

The school follows the state education system but with particular emphasis on Jewish traditions and Jewish history, Hebrew, English and computer science. Graduates receive state high school diplomas.

The Levavot Shirim Choir is sponsored by the Day School, and performs in regional festivals.
