= History of the Jews in Azerbaijan =

Azerbaijani Jews יהדות אזרבייג'ן Azərbaycan yəhudiləri
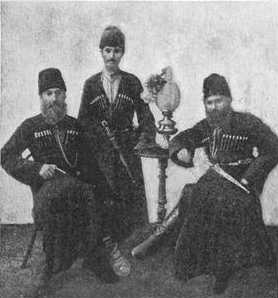

Total population
- 5,094 (2019 census data)

Languages
- Hebrew (in Israel), Azerbaijani, Judeo-Tat, Russian

Religion
- Judaism

Related ethnic groups
- Mountain Jews, Ashkenazi Jews, Georgian Jews

The history of the Jews in Azerbaijan dates back many centuries. Today, Jews in Azerbaijan mainly consist of three distinct groups: Mountain Jews, the most sizable and most ancient group; Ashkenazi Jews, who settled in the area during the late 19th – early 20th centuries, and during World War II; and Georgian Jews who settled mainly in Baku during the early part of the 20th century.

== Distribution ==
Historically, Jews in Azerbaijan have been represented by various subgroups, mainly Mountain Jews, Ashkenazi Jews and Georgian Jews. Azerbaijan at one point was or still is home to smaller communities of Krymchaks, Kurdish Jews and Bukharian Jews, as well Gerim (converts) and non-Jewish Judaistic groups like Subbotniks. In those days, Jews used to live in and around the city of Shamakhi (mainly in the village of Mücü), but the community has been non-existent since the early 1920s. In 2002, the total number of Jewish residents in Azerbaijan was 10,000 people with about 5,500 of them being Mountain Jews. A few more thousand descend from mixed families. In 2010, the total Jewish population in Azerbaijan was 6,400. Jews mainly reside in the cities of Baku, Ganja, Sumqayit, Quba, Oğuz, Goychay and the town of Qırmızı Qəsəbə, the only town in the world where Mountain Jews constitute the majority (and the only fully Jewish town outside of Israel).

== History ==
Archaeological excavations carried out in 1990 resulted in the discovery of the remains of the 7th-century Jewish settlement near Baku, and of a synagogue 25 kilometres to the southeast of Quba. The first religious meeting-house in Baku was built in 1832, and was reorganized into a synagogue in 1896; more synagogues were built in Baku and its suburbs in the late 19th century. The first choir synagogue in Baku opened in 1910.

From the late 19th century, Baku became one of the centres of the Zionist movement in the Russian Empire. The first Hovevei Zion was established here in 1891, followed by the first Zionist organization in 1899. The movement remained strong in the short-lived Democratic Republic of Azerbaijan (1918–1920) marked with the establishment of the Jewish Popular University in 1919, periodicals printed in Yiddish, Hebrew, Judæo-Tat and Russian, and a number of schools, social clubs, benevolent societies and cultural organizations.

After Sovietization, all Zionism-related activities including those of cultural nature that were carried out in Hebrew were banned. In the early 1920s a few hundred Mountain Jewish families from Azerbaijan and Dagestan left for Israel and settled in Tel-Aviv. The next aliyah did not take place until the 1970s, after the ban on Jewish immigration to Israel was lifted (see: Refusenik (Soviet Union)). Between 1972 and 1978 around 3,000 people left Azerbaijan for Israel. 1970 was the demographic peak for Azerbaijani Jews after World War II; according to the census, 41,288 Jews resided in Azerbaijan that year.

Most of the Azerbaijani Jewish population fled amid rising antisemitism and violence against Jews during the Soviet dissolution and independence of Azerbaijan. The majority of Jewish refugees from Azerbaijan emigrated to Israel or the United States. Israeli PM Yitzhak Shamir expressed hope that the Azerbaijani Jewish refugees could be settled in occupied West Bank. However, Israeli diplomat Miron Gordon, who oversaw issuing visas, welcomed Azerbaijani Jews regardless of whether they settled in Israel or the occupied territories. Gordon stated that of all the collapsing Soviet republics, the Jews in Azerbaijan faced the greatest threat of violence, and thus their immigration was prioritized by the Israeli Consulate.

In a 1992 survey of antisemitism in the former Soviet Union, which compared results of a similar survey in 1990, Azerbaijan and Uzbekistan displayed the largest surge in antisemitism. The causes were primarily attributed to Islamic nationalism and envy of Jews stereotyped as having wealth and privilege.

Many Jewish émigrés from Azerbaijan settled in Tel-Aviv and Haifa. There are relatively large communities of Mountain Jewish expatriates from Azerbaijan in New York City and Toronto.

A new Jewish synagogue, which became one of the biggest synagogues in Europe opened in Baku on 9 March 2003. There is also a Jewish school, operating in Azerbaijan since 2003. Currently, there are seven functioning synagogues in Azerbaijan: three in Baku, two in Quba and two in Oghuz. Some of them were constructed with government financial support. In January 2020, The Association of Mountain Jews opened a new community center in Moscow's Sokolniki Park.

== Mountain Jews ==
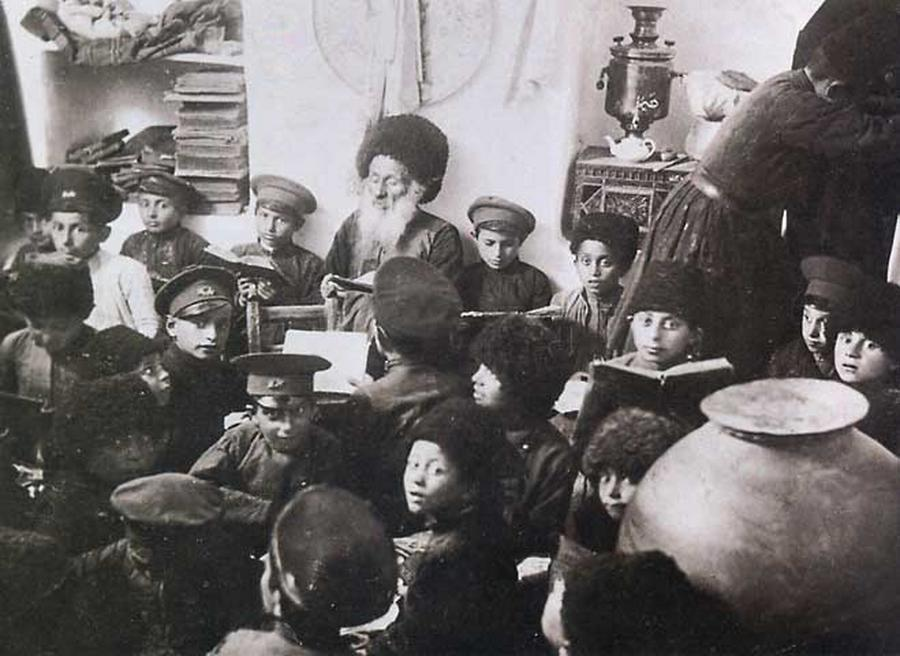
A class held at a Jewish school in Quba (early 1920s)

Mountain Jews are believed to have moved north making way to mass migration of Oguz Turks into the region. Their increase in number was supported by a constant flow of Jews from Iran. In the late Middle Ages Jews from Gilan founded a settlement in Oguz. Throughout the medieval epoch Mountain Jews were establishing cultural and economic ties with other Jewish communities of the Mediterranean. Agriculture and fabric trade was their main occupation until Sovietization. Some families practiced polygamy. In 1730, Huseyn Ali, the ruler of the Quba Khanate (then newly separated from the Safavid Empire), issued a decree according to which Jews could own property in the khanate.

According to the 1926 Soviet census, there were 7,500 Mountain Jews in Azerbaijan (roughly 25% of the country's entire Jewish population). The exact numbers of the late Soviet period are unknown, since many were counted or preferred to be counted as Tats mostly due to the antisemitic attitude of the Soviet government. The theory of common origins of Tats and Mountain Jews (previously referred to as Judæo-Tats) has been vehemently dismissed by a number of researchers.

Mountain Jews currently dominate the entire Jewish Diaspora of Azerbaijan. They speak a distinct dialect of the Tat language called Juhuri or Judæo-Tat. The majority speaks more than one language, the second and/or third one most often being Azeri or Russian.

== Ashkenazi Jews ==
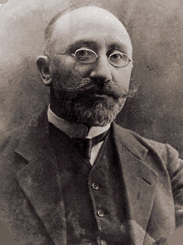
Dr. Yevsey Gindes, Minister of Health of the Azerbaijan Democratic Republic

1811 is the year when the first Ashkenazi Jews settled in Baku, but their mass immigration to what is now Azerbaijan did not start until the 1870s. Their immigration was relatively steady leading them to outnumber the local Mountain Jewish community by 1910. They settled mostly in the booming oil-rich city of Baku. The Caspian-Black Sea Company, one of the leading oil companies in the Russian Empire, was established in Baku by the wealthy Rothschild family of German Jewish origin. Ashkenazi Jews continued immigrating to Azerbaijan until the late 1940s, with a number of them being World War II evacuees from Russia, Ukraine and Belarus who chose to stay in their country of refuge.

Ashkenazi Jews were particularly active in Azerbaijani politics. Dr. Yevsey Gindes, a Kyiv native, served as Minister of Health of the Democratic Republic of Azerbaijan (1918–1920). Along with that, 6 of the 26 Baku Commissars were Ashkenazi Jewish. In 1912 around one third of Baku's registered lawyers and physicians were Ashkenazi Jewish as well.

The post-1972 aliyah largely affected this subgroup of Azerbaijani Jews, as among all they were more exposed to emigration. This resulted in the decline of their number, making Mountain Jews the largest Jewish group of Azerbaijan by the mid-1990s. Today there are about 500 Ashkenazi Jews living in the country.

Similar to many immigrant communities of the Czarist and Soviet eras in Azerbaijan, Ashkenazi Jews appear to be linguistically Russified. The majority of Ashkenazi Jews speak Russian as their first language with Azeri being spoken as the second. The number of Yiddish-speakers is unknown.

Rabbi Shneor Segal serves as the Chief Rabbi of the Ashkenazi community since 2010. He is a member of the Alliance of Rabbis in Islamic States and the top Chabad emissary to Baku.

== Other Jewish subgroups ==
It is not clear whether local Jewish communities had established ties with Georgian Jews before the Czarist epoch, however by the 1910s the Georgian Jewish diaspora in Baku already accounted for its own educational club. Today there are a few hundreds of Georgian Jews living in Azerbaijan.

In 1827 first groups of Judæo-Aramaic-speaking Kurdish Jews started settling in Azerbaijan. In 1919–1939 a synagogue for Kurdish Jews functioned in Baku. After Sovietization the attitude of the Stalinist Soviet government towards them was somewhat unfavourable, and in 1951 all Kurdish Jews were deported from the Caucasus.

Krymchaks, who nowadays number only 2,500 people worldwide, consequently remained in quite low numbers in Azerbaijan throughout the 20th century. There were only 41 of them in the country in 1989. Bukharian Jews numbered 88 persons.

== Gerim and Subbotniks ==
Gerim and Subbotniks were ethnic Russians from various parts of Russia who converted to Judaism primarily in the 1820s. In 1839–1841 the Czarist government expelled these communities to the newly conquered South Caucasus, mainly to what is now Azerbaijan. Upon arriving here, they founded several settlements around Jalilabad (then called Astrakhan-Bazar), of which the largest one was Privolnoye, Azerbaijan. It later became the largest Judaistic Russian settlement in Russia. By the late Soviet epoch the overall number of Gerim and Subbotniks in Azerbaijan was 5,000. There were only around 200 of them left in 1997 (when the region was visited by a research group from Saint Petersburg) with many planning to move to Russia and leaving virtually no chance for further preservation of this unique community.

== Life of the community ==
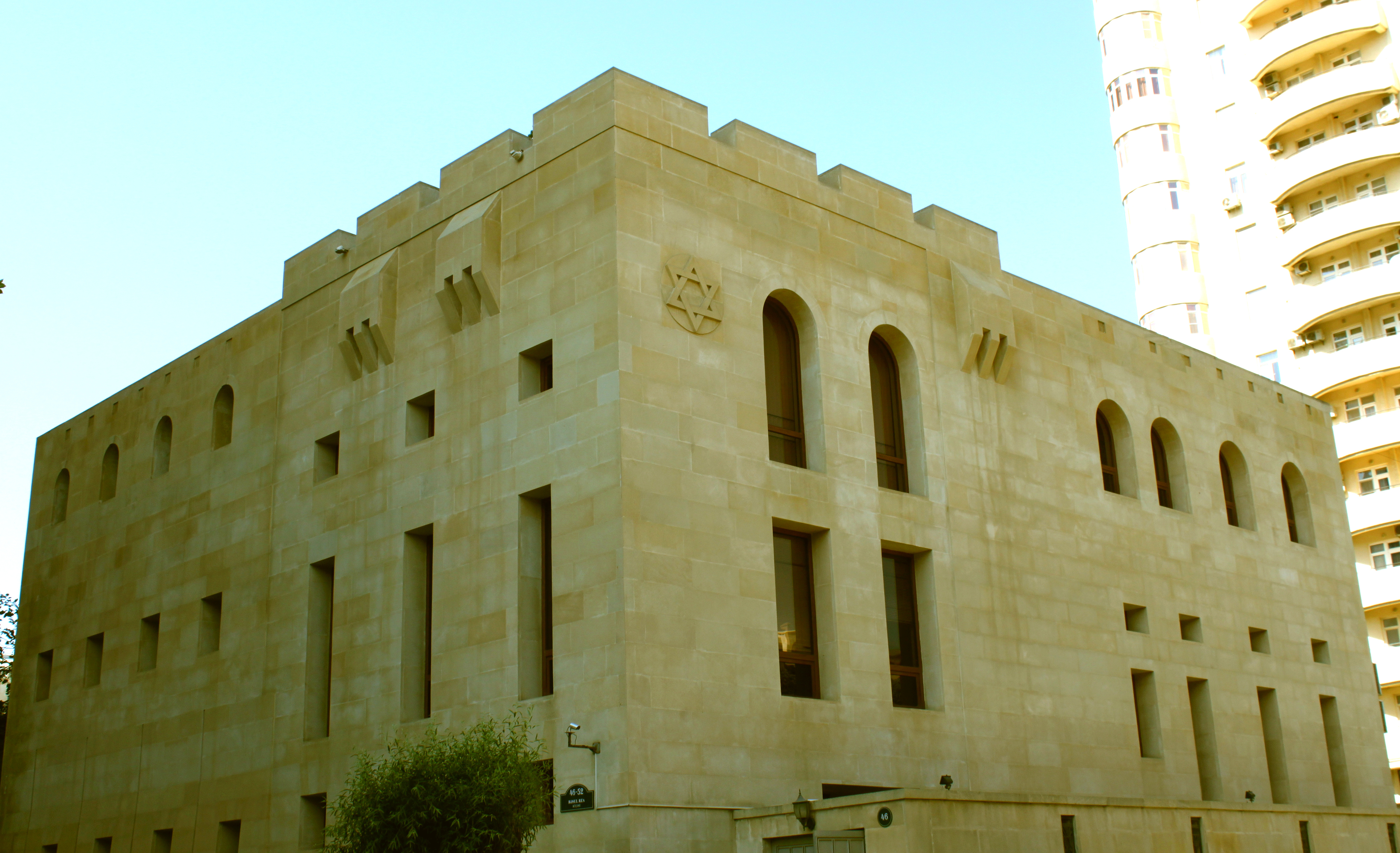
Synagogue of the Ashkenazi Jews in Baku

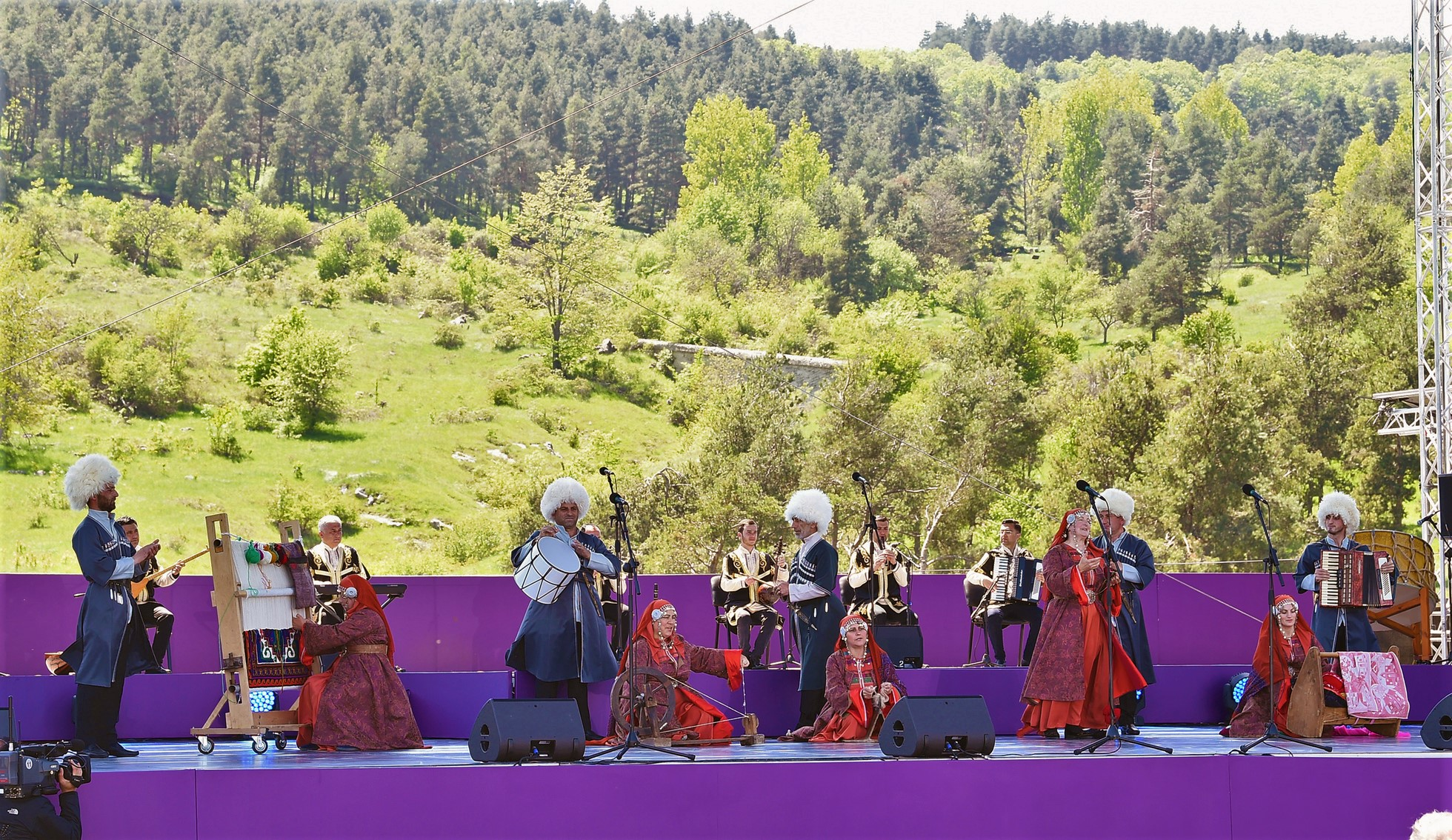
Azerbaijani Jew dance group. Khari Bulbul Music Festival

In the Soviet era, Jews in Azerbaijan displayed high rates of marriage outside their community. In 1989, 48% of Ashkenazi Jews and 18% of Mountain Jews were married to non-Jews.

Beginning in the 1960s, Azerbaijan's Jewish community experienced cultural revival. Jewish samizdat publications started being printed. Many cultural and Zionist organizations were reestablished in Baku and Sumqayit since 1987, and the first legal Hebrew courses in the Soviet Union were opened in Baku.

Education in Jewish languages was discontinued by the Kremlin in the 1930s and the 1940s, and teaching in Yiddish and Juhuri was replaced by that in Russian. After the fall of the Soviet Union, a yeshiva opened in Baku in 1994 and an Ohr Avner Chabad Day School was established in 1999. In 1994, Hebrew was studied at one state university and offered as a course choice in two secondary schools. On 31 May 2007, a groundbreaking ceremony for the construction of the Ohr Avner Chabad Centre for Jewish Studies took place in Baku. The centre is intended to include a day school, a kindergarten, residence halls, a scientific centre, a library, etc.

According to the Report on Global Anti-Semitism released by the USA Bureau of Democracy, Human Rights, and Labor on 5 January 2005, "Cases of prejudice and discrimination against Jews in the country were very limited, and in the few instances of anti-Semitic activity the Government has been quick to respond. The Government does not condone or tolerate persecution of Jews by any party". Jews do not suffer from discrimination, and the country is remarkably free from antisemitism.

In 2005 Yevda Abramov, himself a Jew, was elected to the National Assembly of Azerbaijan as an MP representing the Rural Guba riding.

As of 2017, there are seven synagogues in Azerbaijan: three in Baku (one for each community, the Ashkenazi, Mountain and Georgian; the second one being the largest in the Caucasus), two in Qırmızı Qəsəbə near Quba, and two in Oğuz.

A delegation of the World Jewish Congress visited Azerbaijan in September 2016 where during the talks with the Azeri President Ilham Aliyev emphasis was put on "Excellent relations with Jewish community and Israel".

Azerbaijan was also visited by John Shapiro, executive director of the American Jewish Committee, in January 2017, shortly after the visit of Benjamin Netanyahu to Baku. During the interview, Shapiro said that "the delegation met with the Jewish community in Azerbaijan and saw they are very happy and feel very comfortable living in the country".

In 2020, the Azerbaijan Jewish Media Center was established in Sumgayit.

== Historical demographics ==
Historical Azerbaijani Jewish population
Year	Pop.	±%
1886	10,357	—
1897	8,430	−18.6%
1926	59,768	+609.0%
1939	41,245	−31.0%
1959	46,091	+11.7%
1970	49,057	+6.4%
1979	44,345	−9.6%
1989	41,072	−7.4%
1999	8,916	−78.3%
2009	9,084	+1.9%
2019	5,094	−43.9%
Source: The Jewish population data includes Mountain Jews, Georgian Jews, Bukharan Jews (or Central Asian Jews), Krymchaks (all per the 1959 Soviet census), and Tats.

Azerbaijan's Jewish population significantly decreased between 1926 and 1939, but then didn't change much between 1939 and 1989 (it increased a little until 1970, and then decreased a little until 1989). Since 1989 and the fall of Communism, Azerbaijan's Jewish population has significantly decreased. Most of the Jews in Azerbaijan left and moved to other countries between 1989 and 2002, with most of them moving to Israel.

== Famous Azerbaijani Jews ==
- Yevda Abramov, Member of the National Assembly of Azerbaijan and Deputy chairman of Azerbaijani National Assembly's Committee on Human Rights, representing a part of Azerbaijani Jewish community.
- Albert Agarunov, Starshina of the Azerbaijani Army who died during the First Nagorno-Karabakh War, National Hero of Azerbaijan.
- Valery Belenky, artistic gymnast, he won the team gold and all around bronze with the Unified Team in the 1992 Olympics in Barcelona.
- Max Black, British-American philosopher, who was a leading influential figure in analytic philosophy in the first half of the twentieth century.
- Misha Black, British architect and designer.
- Bella Davidovich, American pianist.
- Larisa Dolina, Russian (former Soviet) jazz and pop singer and an actress.
- Dov Gazit, chief-commander of the IAF (Israeli Air Force) Technical School in Haifa, while serving in Africa, he acquired a lion cub, which became the first lion in Dr. Aharon Shulov Jerusalem Biblical Zoo.
- Yevsey Gindes, statesman and pediatrician who served as the Minister of Healthcare of Azerbaijan Democratic Republic, and was member of Azerbaijani National Council and later Parliament of Azerbaijan.
- Lena Glaz, chess player, Israeli Woman International Master (WIM, 1985). She is a winner the Israeli Women's Chess Championship (1980).
- Solomon Grobshtein, One of the founders and organizers of the Azerbaijani oil industry.
- Yuli Gusman, film director and actor. He is the founder and CEO of the Nika Award.
- Lala Hasanova, science fiction writer.
- Zarakh Iliev, billionaire property developer.
- Gavriil Ilizarov, Soviet physician, known for inventing the Ilizarov apparatus for lengthening limb bones and for his eponymous surgery.
- Telman Ismailov, Russian-Turkish entrepreneur and businessman
- Garry Kasparov, Russian (formerly Soviet) chess Grandmaster, former World Chess Champion, writer, and political activist, considered by many to be the greatest chess player of all time.
- Mirza Khazar, author, political analyst, anchorman, radio journalist, publisher, and translator.
- Mirra Komarovsky, American pioneer in the sociology of gender.
- Lev Landau, physicist who made fundamental contributions to many areas of theoretical physics, he received the 1962 Nobel Prize.
- Ella Leya, Azerbaijani-American composer, singer, and writer.
- Yagutil Mishiev, writer, author. The distinguished Teacher of the Republic of Dagestan and the Russian Federation.
- Lev Nussimbaum, writer and journalist
- God Nisanov, property developer, philanthropist and Vice President of the World Jewish Congress.
- Teimour Radjabov Azerbaijani chess grandmaster, his father Boris Sheynin was a Jew.
- Vladimir Abramovich Rokhlin, mathematician
- Yosef Shagal, politician and former journalist, since 2012 he is the ambassador of Israel to Belarus.
- Zechariah Sitchin, author
- Emil Sutovsky, chess Grandmaster and the president of the Association of Chess Professionals.
- Boris Vannikov, Soviet government and military official, a three-star General.
- Lotfi A. Zadeh, mathematician, electrical engineer, computer scientist, creator of "fuzzy logic" artificial intelligence researcher and professor emeritus of computer science at the University of California, Berkeley.
- Tatiana Zatulovskaya, chess player, Woman Grandmaster, and the 1993 Senior Women's World Chess Champion.
- Yakov Zevin, Communist activist, one of the Bolshevik Party leaders in Azerbaijan during the Russian Revolution.

== See also ==
- Azerbaijan–Israel relations
- Jewish National Council (Azerbaijan)
- Judaism by country
- Ohr Avner Chabad Day School (Baku)
- Qırmızı Qəsəbə, the only completely Jewish town outside of Israel and The United States
- Religion in Azerbaijan
- Synagogues in Azerbaijan
- Quba mass grave
