= Leviev =

Leviev (Bulgarian or Russian: Левиев) is a Slavic masculine surname, its feminine counterpart is Levieva. It is a Russification of the Jewish surname "Levi". It may refer to

- Lev Avnerovich Leviev (born 1956), Bukharian Jewish businessman
- Lev Binzumovich Leviev (born 1984), Russian–Israeli Internet entrepreneur and investor
- Simon Leviev (born 1990), Israeli conman
- Margarita Levieva (born 1980), Russian-American actress
- Milcho Leviev (1937–2019), Bulgarian Jewish composer, arranger and jazz performer
- Yoan Leviev (1934–1994), Bulgarian artist
