= Ohr Avner Chabad Day School (Baku) =

Chabad school

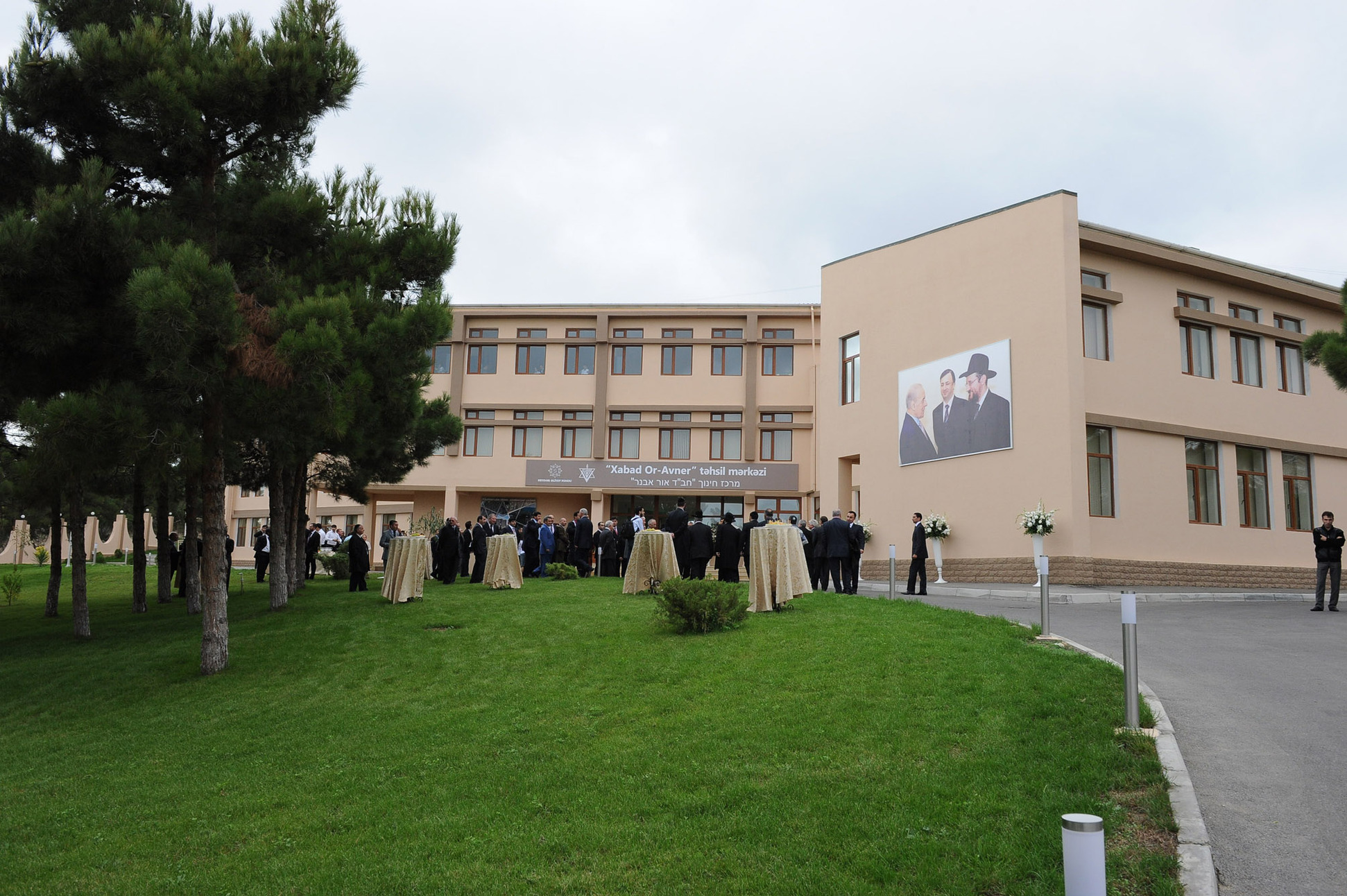
Ohr Avner Chabad Day School

Ohr Avner Chabad Day School (also known as Chabad Ohr Avner) is an educational complex founded by Baku religious community of Jews.

The school was registered for a teaching license on April 25, 2003.

As a part of Ohr Avner Chabad strategy, a special attention is paid to development of spiritual and intellectual studies of every member of the community for further involvement in social infrastructure of Azerbaijan.

As of 2010, 400 students were educated at the center.

During his visit to Azerbaijan in 2016, Israeli Prime Minister Benjamin Netanyahu attended the school, met with the local Jewish community and gave a speech before students.

== See also ==
- History of the Jews in Azerbaijan
- Jews of Azerbaijan
- Mountain Jews
- Qırmızı Qəsəbə, the primary settlement of Azerbaijan's population of Mountain Jews.
