= Dilara Aliyeva =

Azerbaijani philologist (1929–1991)

- Dilarə Əliyeva
- Born: December 14, 1929; Tbilisi
- Died: April 19, 1991 (aged 61); Qakh
- Resting place: Alley of Honor
- Education: Baku State University
- Occupations: Philologist, translator and women's rights activist

Dilara Alakbar qizi Aliyeva (Azerbaijani: Dilarə Əliyeva; 14 December 1929 – 19 April 1991) was an Azerbaijani philologist, translator, Women's rights activist and Member of The Supreme Council of Azerbaijan from 1990–1991.

== Early life and education ==
Dilara Aliyeva was born on December 14, 1929, in Tbilisi, Georgia to the family of a blacksmith. She received secondary education in the local Azeri-language school. She studied Oriental studies at Baku State University. After receiving her B.A., she was admitted to a graduate program at the Nizami Institute of Language and Literature of the National Academy of Sciences of Azerbaijan from which she switched to the Rustaveli Institute of Literature of the Georgian Academy of Sciences. She worked on a dissertation on Reflection of Azerbaijani-Georgian literary relations in the literature of the XIX century and defended it in 1954.

== Career ==
She later worked in several positions at the Nizami Institute, where she studied the literary heritage of the medieval poet Nizami and the historical interactions and comparisons between Azeri and Georgian literature. Aliyeva became a senior researcher at the Institute and then the head of the Department of Ancient and Medieval Literature. She was also a senior researcher in the Department of Literary Relations and The Department of Legal Studies. She was a member of the Writers' Union of Azerbaijan from 1960. In 1988, she received her Ph.D. in philology and joined the Azerbaijan Popular Front, where she soon became one of its executives.

== Contribution ==
Dilara Aliyeva founded the Azerbaijan Association for the Protection of Women's Rights.

== Death ==
She died on 19 April 1991 in a car crash (in which the philologist Aydin Mammadov was also killed) and was buried in Baku. A street in Baku and the association founded by Dilara Aliyeva was named after her.

== Works ==
Original publications in Azerbaijani:

- Ürəkbir, diləkbir. Baku: Yazıçı, 1981, 217 pages.
- "M. F. Akhundov and His Connections with Georgian Literature." — "Proceedings of the Unified Scientific Session of the USSR Academy of Sciences and the Academies of Sciences of the Transcaucasian Republics on Social Sciences." Stenographic Report. — Baku: Academy of Sciences of the Azerbaijan SSR, 1957, pp. 687–690.
- "From the History of Azerbaijani-Georgian Literary Relations." — Baku: Academy of Sciences of the Azerbaijan SSR, 1958. 177 pages.
- "Azerbaijani Classical Writers on Georgia and Tbilisi." — "Zarya Vostoka" (Dawn of the East), 1958, No. 244, October 19.
- "Glory to the Brotherhood of Nations." [From the History of Azerbaijani-Georgian Literary Relations]. — "Literature Georgia" 1974, No. 5, pp. 82–86.
- "Nizami and Georgian Literature" — Baku: Elm, 1988. 212 pages.

== Translations ==
Aliyeva was also the author of several translations into Azerbaijani:

- Qardaşlar (hekayələr). (Brothers (stories)) Baku: Azərnəşr, 1972, 122 pages.
- Bir gecənin sevinci (hekayələr). (The joy of one night (stories)) Baku: Gənclik, 1977, 82 pages.
- Arçil Sulakauri. Aşağı-yuxarı (povest və hekayələr). (Archil Sulakauri, Up and down (narratives and stories)) Baku: 1978, 185 pages.
- Şota Rustaveli. Pələng dərisi geymiş pəhləvan. (Shota Rustaveli, The Knight in the Panther's Skin) Baku: Elm, 1978, 201 pages.
- Mixail Cavaxişvili. Torpaq çəkir. (Mikheil Javakhishvili, The ground draws) Baku: Yazıçı, 1980, 248 pages. (şərikli).
- İlya Çavçavadze. Dilənçinin hekayəti. (Ilia Chavchavadze, The story of the beggar) Baku: Yazıçı, 1987, 151 pages.
- Kür Xəzərə qovuşur (gürcü ədəbiyyatından seçmələr). (The Kura joins the Caspian (selections from Georgian literature)) Baku: Yazıçı, 1988, 383 pages. (şərikli).
