= Ohr Avner Foundation =

Philanthropic educational foundation founded by Lev Leviev

- קרן אור אבנר וחנה

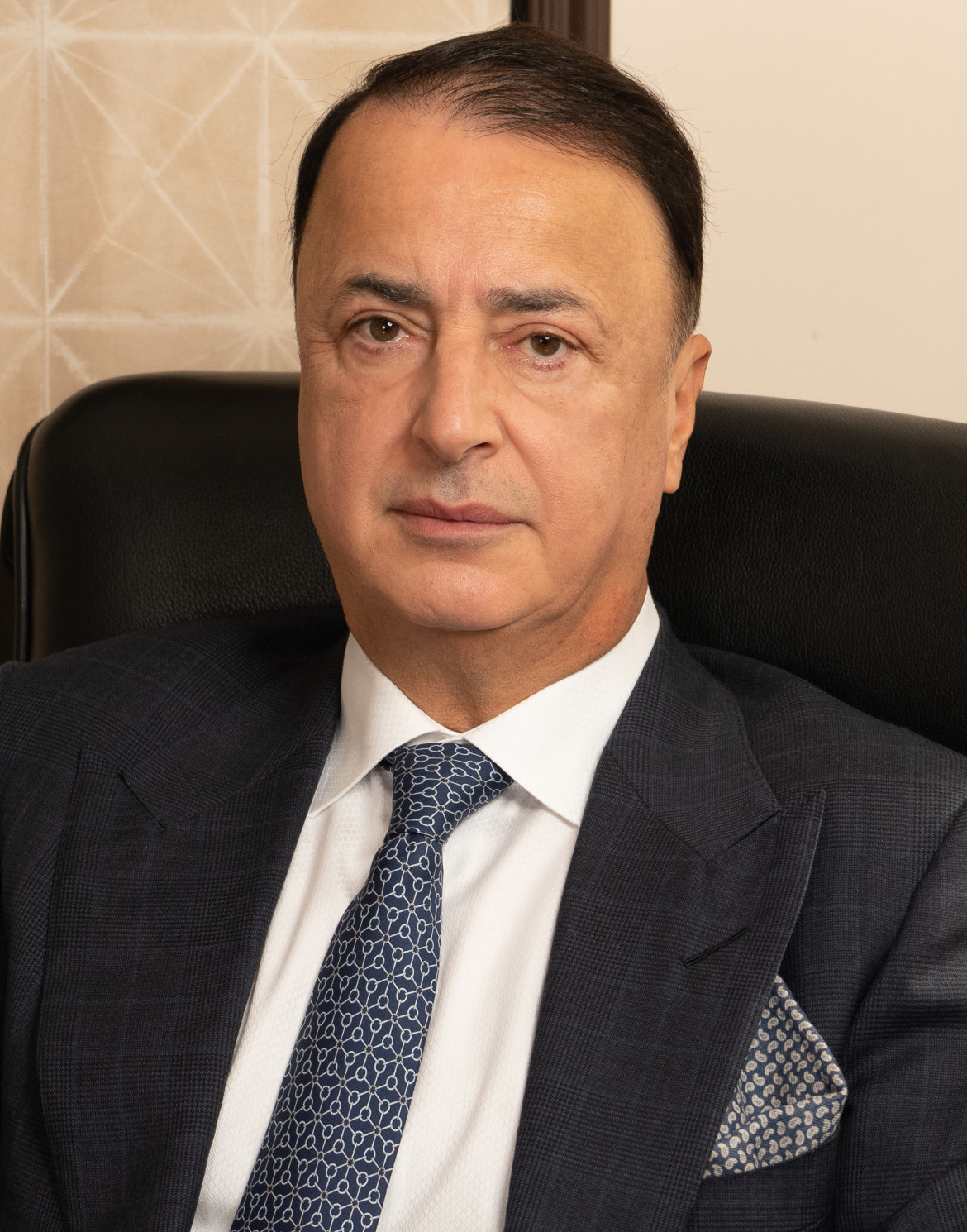
- Founder Lev Leviev
- Named after: Rabbi Avner Leviev
- Formation: 1992; 34 years ago
- Founder: Lev Leviev
- Location: Israel
- Key people: Rabbi Yehuda Blau (CEO, Israel); Rabbi Zalman Zvulonov (CEO, USA); Rabbi David Mondshine (CEO, FSU)

Ohr Avner Foundation (formally the Ohr Avner and Chana Foundation; קרן אור אבנר וחנה) is an international Jewish educational organization and philanthropic foundation founded in 1992 by Israeli-Uzbek businessman and philanthropist Lev Leviev. The foundation was named in memory of Leviev's father, Rabbi Avner Leviev (and later also in memory of his mother, Chana). Affiliated with the Chabad-Lubavitch movement, the organization establishes, develops, and funds formal and informal educational networks, community centers, synagogues, and welfare projects across Israel, the United States, and the former Soviet Union.

== History ==
The foundation was established in 1992 by diamond magnate and philanthropist Lev Leviev following the dissolution of the Soviet Union. The organization was named in memory of Leviev's father, Rabbi Avner Leviev, a prominent leader of the Bukharian Jewish community in Samarkand, Uzbekistan, who was known for his dedication to preserving Jewish traditions and underground education during the Soviet era. Following the passing of Leviev's mother, Chana, her name was also incorporated into the foundation's full formal title (the Ohr Avner and Chana Foundation).

The initiative to establish an extensive educational and communal support foundation was undertaken with the personal guidance and blessing of the Lubavitcher Rebbe, Rabbi Menachem Mendel Schneerson. Leviev sought to revitalize Jewish identity and religious education across the post-Soviet republics after decades of communist repression.

While the foundation initially concentrated its philanthropic efforts on opening Jewish day schools, youth camps, and communal aid across Russia and the Commonwealth of Independent States (CIS), it gradually broadened its global scope in the late 1990s and 2000s. It expanded significantly to Israel—funding large-scale immigrant absorption, vocational campuses, school networks, and heritage curricula—and subsequently to the United States, building educational and communal institutions for the growing Bukharian and Russian-speaking Jewish diaspora.

== Activities in Israel ==
In Israel, operations are organized under the registered non-profit Ohr Avner (אור אבנר (ע"ר)), directed by CEO Rabbi Yehuda Blau. The organization focuses on widespread educational support, specialized youth village training, community welfare, and curricular integration.

Key initiatives and projects include:

- Nationwide Educational Network: The foundation supports and operates dozens of educational institutions across Israel, encompassing early childhood day-care centers, kindergartens, primary day schools, and secondary schools serving diverse student populations.
- Kfar Sitrin Youth Village (Or Avner Sitrin): The foundation's primary campus in northern Israel near Mount Carmel, located at Kfar Sitrin. The village features a technological yeshiva high school, professional vocational tracks in engineering and technology, a post-secondary engineering college (Practical Engineer certification), and residential dormitories, heavily integrating youth from immigrant backgrounds and students participating in the Naale program.
- Community Welfare and Social Support: Funding humanitarian relief drives, seasonal holiday financial assistance, and food distribution programs for underprivileged families, alongside community programs for immigrants from Central Asia and the former Soviet Union.
- Past Curriculum Initiatives (Zman Masa): In the past, the organization developed wide-scale identity programs integrated within state schools, most notably Zman Masa (זמן מסע), an educational flagship project that organized structured heritage journeys, workshops, and immersive pedagogical experiences focused on Jewish identity.

== Activities in the United States ==
In the United States, the foundation's operations are headed by CEO Rabbi Zalman Zvulonov, primarily serving the Bukharian Jewish and Russian-speaking Jewish communities in New York, concentrated in Queens.

The foundation established and operates:

- Jewish Institute of Queens (JIQ): A flagship educational campus in Queens providing comprehensive Jewish and general studies across early childhood, elementary, and middle school departments.
- Secondary Institutions: The JIQ Boys High School and the Ohr Chana High School for Girls.
- Bukharian Jewish Community Center (BJCC): A prominent community hub housing multiple synagogues, daily and Sabbath prayer services, youth leagues, adult education classes, and community assistance initiatives.
- Youth Programs: Operation of Camp Ohr Avner and seasonal recreational day camps for community youth.

== Activities in the Former Soviet Union ==
The foundation was established in 1992 to assist in rebuilding Jewish communal and religious infrastructure across the Commonwealth of Independent States (CIS) following the dissolution of the Soviet Union. Regional operations have been managed locally by Director Rabbi David Mondshine in cooperation with Chief Rabbi Berel Lazar and regional Jewish communities.

Its network across Russia, Ukraine, Azerbaijan, and Central Asia has included:

- Operating a network of Jewish day schools, high schools, and preschools providing general academics alongside Jewish studies.
- Establishing pedagogical support frameworks, including teacher training programs, resource centers, and summer camps for youth.
- Subsidizing social welfare initiatives, including meals programs for students, seasonal food packages, and conducting public Passover Seders and holiday gatherings in regional towns.

== See also ==
- Jewish education
- Kfar Sitrin
- Lev Leviev
- Bukharian Jews
