= Yevsey Gindes =

Azerbaijani politician (1872–1954)

Yevsey Gindes Евсей Гиндес
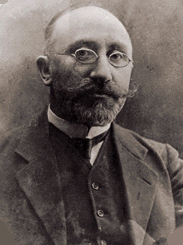

Minister of Healthcare and Social Security of Azerbaijan Democratic Republic (ADR)
- In office 26 December 1918 – 14 March 1919
- President: Fatali Khan Khoyski; Prime Minister, (Chairman of Azerbaijani Parliament)
- Preceded by: Khudadat Rafibeyli
- Succeeded by: Abraham Dastakov

Personal details
- Born: 17 October 1872 Kiev, Ukraine
- Died: 5 September 1954 (aged 81) Baku, Azerbaijan

Yevsey Yakovlevich Gindes (Azerbaijani: Yevsey Yakovleviç Gindes, Russian: Евсей Яковлевич Гиндес; 1872–1954), was an Azerbaijani statesman and pediatrician of Jewish origin who served as the Minister of Healthcare of Azerbaijan Democratic Republic, and was member of Azerbaijani National Council and later Parliament of Azerbaijan. Gindes is considered the founder of modern pediatrics science in Azerbaijan.

== Early years ==
Gindes was born on 17 October 1872 in Kiev, Ukraine. He graduated from Medical Department of Kiev State University in 1897 and immediately started working at Chernov clinic, where he was the director of the Children's Infections department for eight years. At the same time, he conducted research in Kiev Bacteriology Institute and published seven scientific works on children's diseases. In 1905, following the competition of the Congress of Baku Oil workers, he was selected as finalist to lead the Caucasian Factory Hospital in Baku. The hospital he then directed was the Black City Hospital of Baku. In 1907 he founded the first nursery and kindergarten of Baku for the families with low income and established the Azerbaijani branch of the All Russian League for Fighting Tuberculosis, League of Child Protection, etc. In 1913, he was reportedly fired for not charging people for medical care. The same year, he founded Baku Society of Pediatricians which he chaired himself until the organization was incorporated into a branch of the Baku University.

== Political career ==
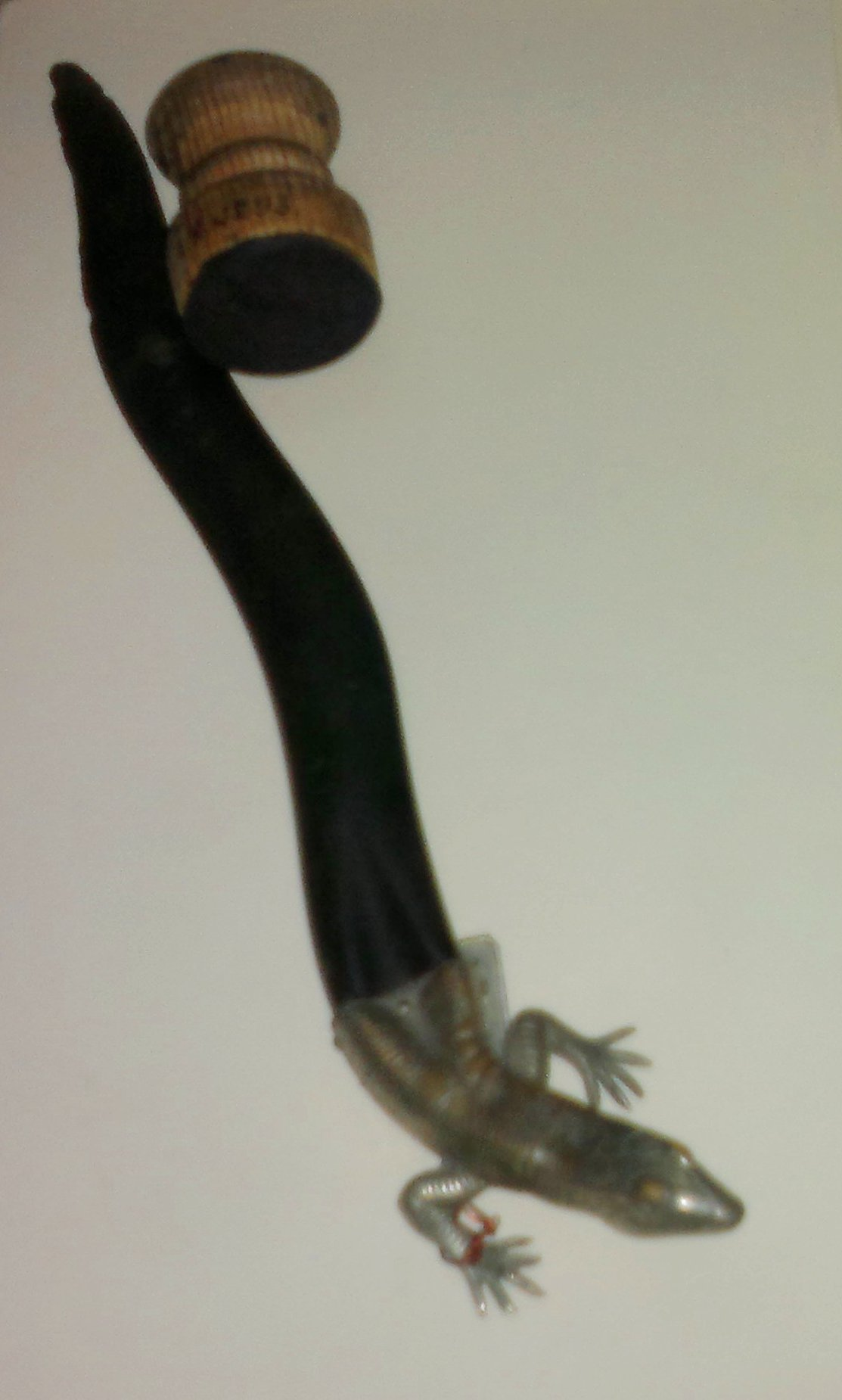
Stamp and knife for cutting paper of Yevsey Gindes. Museum of History of Azerbaijan

With the establishment of Azerbaijan Democratic Republic on 28 May 1918, Gindes participated in formation of the healthcare sector of the country and was appointed the Minister of Healthcare and Social Security of Azerbaijan Democratic Republic in the third cabinet led by Fatali Khan Khoyski on 26 December 1918. In early 1918, he also founded the Children's hospital in Bayil which he directed until 1922. The same year, he was appointed the director of a new hospital in northern part of Baku called Shemakhinka. That is where he conducts administrative reforms and transforms the hospital into Pediatrics Institute, later to become Institute of Maternity and Childcare.

Gindes died in Baku from natural causes on 5 September 1954. The hospital which he had built in 1917 in Sabunchi district of Baku bears his name today.

== See also ==
- Azerbaijani National Council
- Cabinets of Azerbaijan Democratic Republic (1918-1920)
