= Rad (village) =

Rad (village) Rad
- Municipality
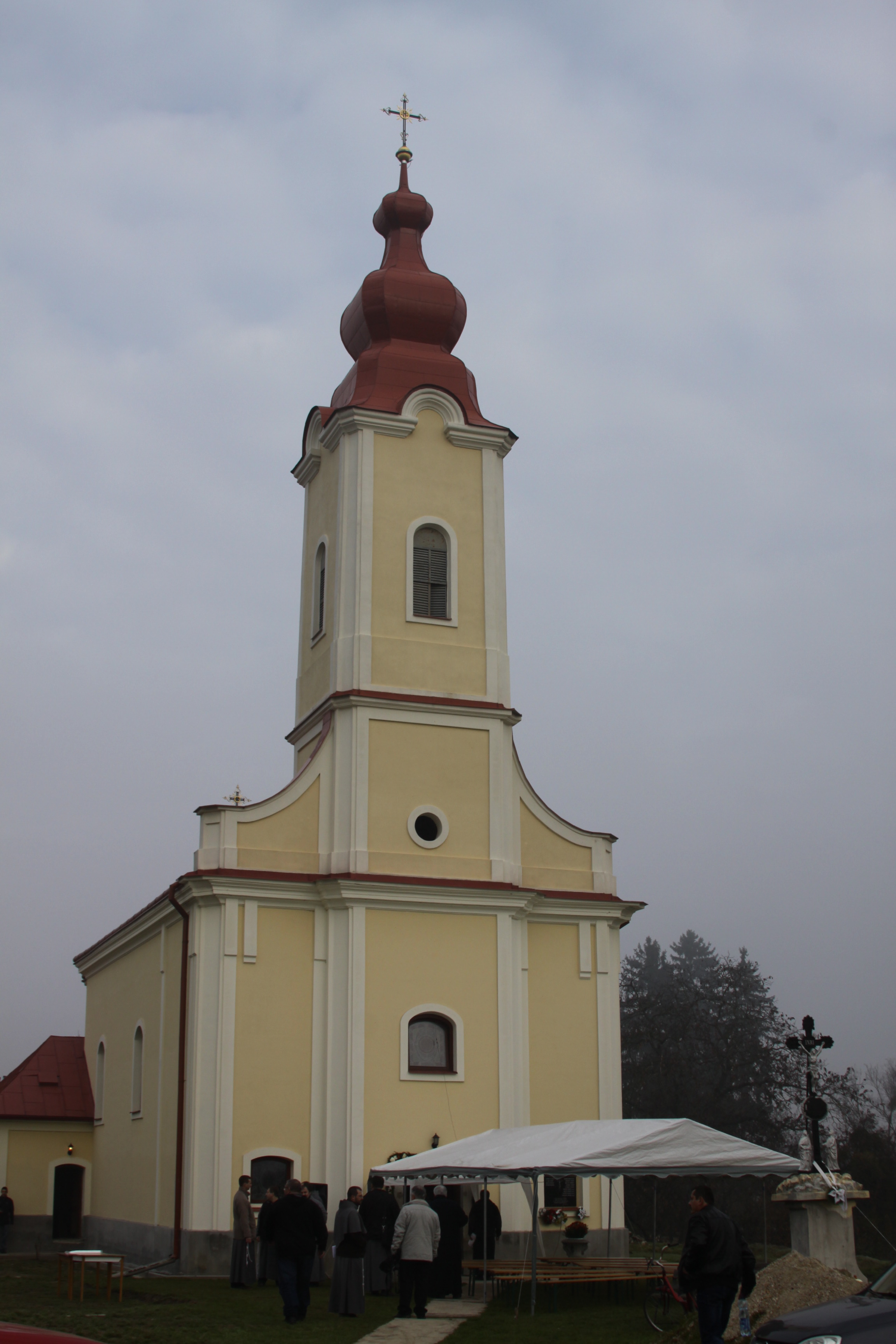
- A church in Rad.

- Flag

- Location of Rad (village) in the Košice Region Location of Rad (village) in Slovakia
- Coordinates: 48.47°N 21.87°E
- Country: Slovakia
- Region: Košice Region
- District: Trebišov District
- First mentioned: 1418

Government
  - Mayor: Mária Mozsárov (Hungarian Alliance)

Area
  - Total: 6.78 km^{2} (2.62 sq mi)
- Elevation: 100 m (330 ft)

Population (2025)
  - Total: 480
- Time zone: UTC+1 (CET)
  - Summer (DST): UTC+2 (CEST)
- Postal code: 763 7
- Area code: +421 56
- Vehicle registration plate (until 2022): TV
- Website: www.obecrad.sk

Rad (Hungarian: Rad) is a village and municipality in the Trebišov District in the Košice Region of eastern Slovakia.

== Geography ==
The municipality lies at an altitude of 100 metres (330 ft) and covers an area of 6.78 km^{2} (2.62 sq mi) (2025).

== Population ==
Population statistic (10 years)
| Year | 1995 | 2005 | 2015 | 2025 |
|---|---|---|---|---|
| Count | 518 | 589 | 543 | 480 |
| Difference | | +13.70% | −7.80% | −11.60% |

Population statistic
| Year | 2024 | 2025 |
|---|---|---|
| Count | 479 | 480 |
| Difference | | +0.20% |

It has a population of 480 people (31 December 2025).

=== Ethnicity ===
Census 2021 (1+ %)
| Ethnicity | Number | Fraction |
|---|---|---|
| Hungarian | 337 | 67.67% |
| Slovak | 143 | 28.71% |
| Not found out | 32 | 6.42% |
| Rusyn | 19 | 3.81% |
| Romani | 9 | 1.8% |
| Total | 498 | |

In year 2021 was 498 people by ethnicity 337 as Hungarian, 143 as Slovak, 32 as Not found out, 19 as Rusyn, 9 as Romani and 2 as Czech.

Note on population: The difference values of population numbers in the table "Population statistic" and in the sections "Ethnicity" & "Religion" is caused by the use of various statistical methods.

=== Religion ===
Census 2021 (1+ %)
| Religion | Number | Fraction |
|---|---|---|
| Roman Catholic Church | 258 | 51.81% |
| Greek Catholic Church | 108 | 21.69% |
| None | 57 | 11.45% |
| Calvinist Church | 37 | 7.43% |
| Not found out | 22 | 4.42% |
| Jehovah's Witnesses | 13 | 2.61% |
| Total | 498 | |

In year 2021 was 498 people by religion 258 from Roman Catholic Church, 108 from Greek Catholic Church, 57 from None, 37 from Calvinist Church, 22 from Not found out, 13 from Jehovah's Witnesses and 3 from Eastern Orthodox Church.
