= Council of Europe Parliamentary Assembly Resolution 2085 (2016) =

Resolution on the conflict in Nagorno-Karabakh

Council of Europe Parliamentary Assembly (PACE) Resolution 2085 (2016) of 26 January 2016 is a resolution in which PACE expressed its concern about the ongoing artificial humanitarian situation in Azerbaijan because of the water crisis deliberately created by Armenia in the aftermath of the Nagorno-Karabakh conflict. The resolution is entitled "Inhabitants of frontier regions of Azerbaijan are deliberately deprived of water". The document makes specific references to the Helsinki Rules on the Uses of the Waters of International Rivers and Berlin Rules on Water Resources, emphasising the importance of ensuring the right to use water and its obligatory nature for states. PACE also recalls the statement of 20 May 2014 by the OSCE Minsk Group Co-Chairs.

The PACE Resolution No. 2085 notes that the current situation of the Sarsang Reservoir, located in the territory of Azerbaijan occupied by Armenia, could possibly result in a new humanitarian crisis and requests the Armenian authorities "to cease using water resources as tools of political influence or an instrument of pressure". Moreover, the non-cooperation of the delegation of the Armenian parliament and other authorized individuals during the preparation of the report on the issue is strongly condemned by the Assembly in the document.

== Background ==
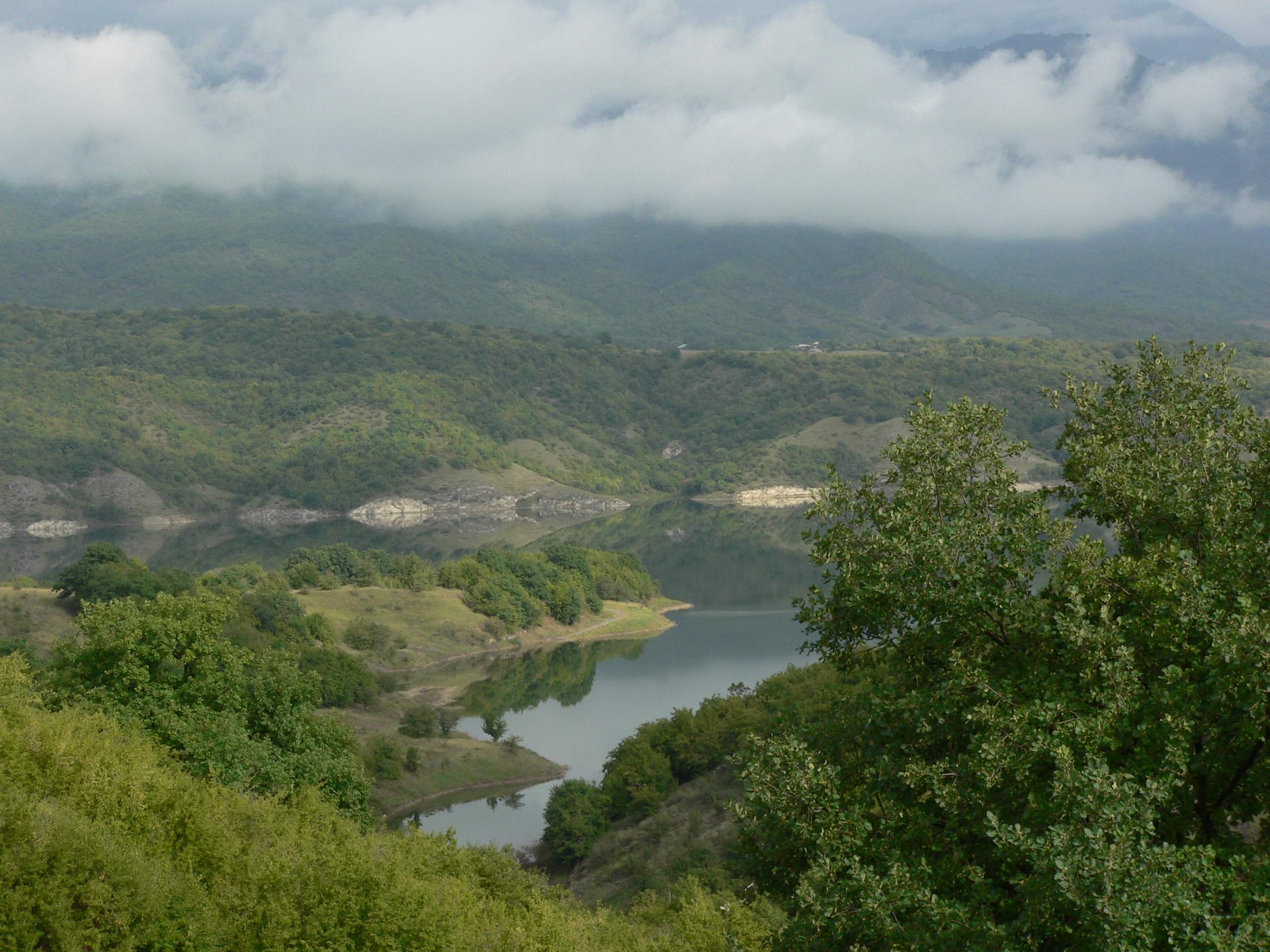
Sarsang Reservoir (2009)

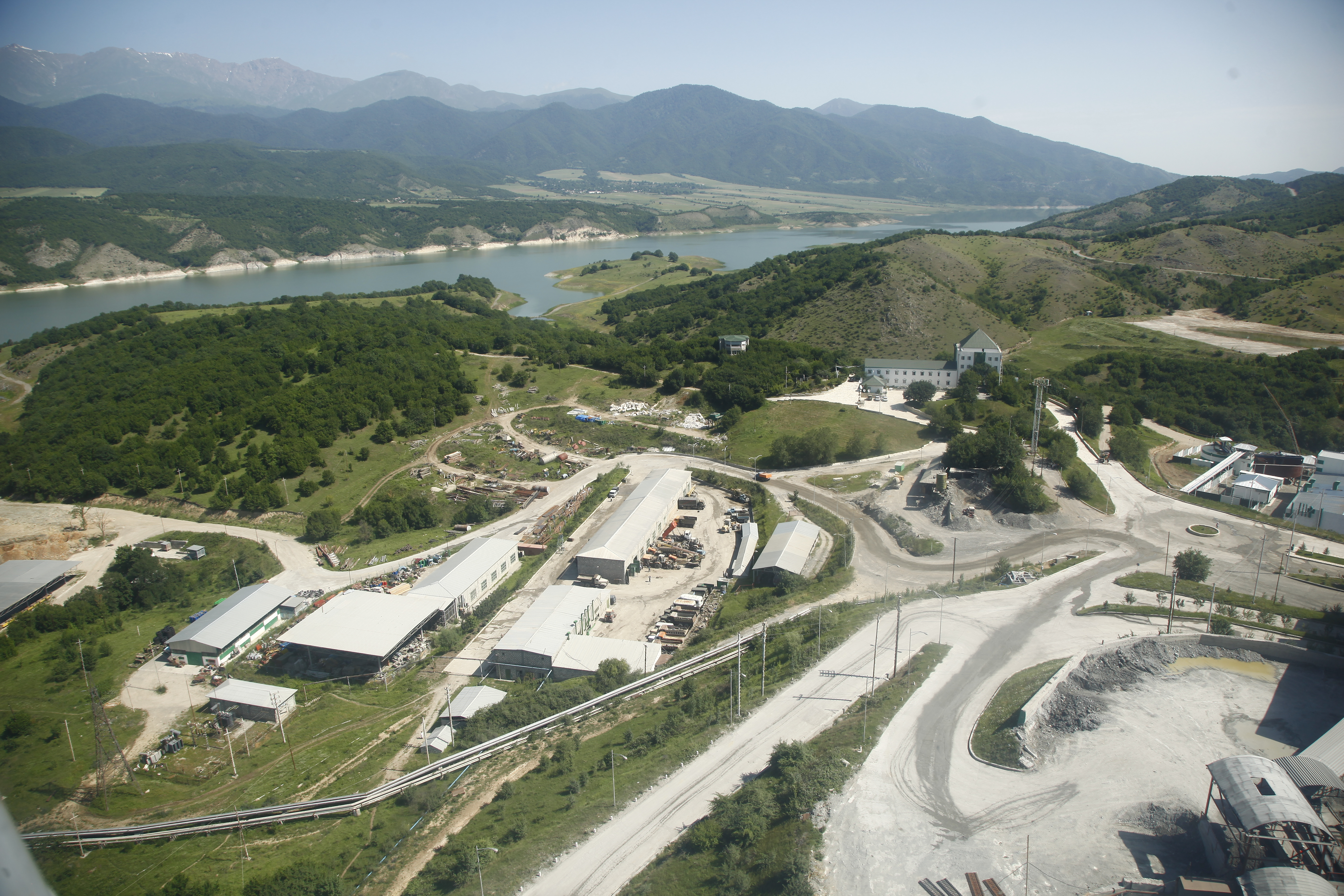
Copper mine in Heyvali (2012)

At the end of the 1980s, the magnitude of the conflict between Armenia and Azerbaijan triggered a large-scale war. This culminated in the occupation of Nagorno-Karabakh and other adjacent areas of Azerbaijan by the Armenian forces. Sarsang Reservoir was one of the strategically important areas captured by Armenians during the clashes. This purpose-built dam and hydroelectric power station, with electric capacity of 50 megawatts, on the Tartar River were constructed in 1976–1977 when Heydar Aliyev was the First Secretary of the Communist Party of Azerbaijan. Consequently, drinking and irrigation water was provided for roughly one hundred twenty thousand hectares of fertile land in six regions, including Tartar, Barda, Yevlakh, Aghjabadi, Aghdam and Goranboy. The outbreak of the war also affected the Sarsang Reservoir, with the highest dam in Azerbaijan and the largest body of water in the Karabakh Economic Region, which has a total water capacity of 575 million m³. At the beginning of February 1993, the Baku radio broadcast that the Armenian forces had made significant gains into the southern part of the reservoir. Towards the end of the month, the Armenians took complete control of the body of water, along with the power plant, and celebrated this operation as an "incomparable victory", blocking the Tartar–Kalbajar road for the Azerbaijanis.

On 12 May 1994, the parties signed a Russian-brokered ceasefire agreement ending the First Nagorno-Karabakh War. However, the loss of the Sarsang Reservoir had far-reaching consequences for the Azerbaijanis living in close proximity; in autumn and winter, water was released by the Armenian authorities from Sarsang without any warning, causing artificial floods in the frontline regions of Azerbaijan. In contrast, during the spring-summer months, water flow was decreased, resulting in irrigation water shortage and droughts, particularly in the villages of Tartar. In the wake of the war, the forcibly displaced people mainly settled in the frontline, which also increased the demand for water. On the other hand, lack of maintenance and related repair activities was one of the major factors that led to environmental, humanitarian and safety concerns for the people of the region. Often the toxic waste from copper and gold mines, operated by Vallex Group company in the village of Heyvali, located near the reservoir, was dumped into local rivers without proper waste handling schemes, resulting in depletion of the fisheries. The chemical water pollution was so serious that it caused widespread gastroenteritis and skin infections among the nearby population. The impossibility of using the reservoir's water also resulted in an increase in saline soils and a decrease in productivity in the districts settled by Azerbaijanis. However, effective negotiations on the water management had not been reached between the parties to the conflict.

Starting in May 2013, the Association for the Development of Civil Society in Azerbaijan (AVCIYA) launched a campaign called "Sarsang SOS: Prevention of Humanitarian Crisis" to draw attention to the environmentally harmful effects of these problems. On 16–19 May 2014, during a visit to the conflict region, the Co-Chairs of the OSCE Minsk Group visited the reservoir and discussed the situation with the current administration. In their statement, the Co-Chairs expressed their hope that the parties would find a viable solution to the joint management issue of water resources for the welfare of the region. Soon after, in September, Armenia's "ArmWaterProject Company Ltd." company presented a project to the so-called Nagorno Karabakh Republic on the construction of a water reservoir in Karabakh for irrigation purposes. Finally, in 2015, Elkhan Suleymanov, the president of AVCIYA, parliamentarian, member of national delegation in the Assembly, proposed to PACE to prepare a draft resolution on the Sarsang Reservoir.

== History ==
On 12 December 2015, the member of PACE representing Bosnia and Herzegovina, Milica Marković, delivered a report on the preparation of the draft resolution. Unlike the adopted resolution, the text of the draft referred to the UN Water Convention of 1992, which Armenia has not ratified.

While preparing the report, Marković stated that she made a fact-finding visit only twice, both to Azerbaijan, in December 2014 and August 2015. The rapporteur emphasised that, despite her official and personal appeal to the Armenian delegation, her visit to Armenia did not take place as her request was not answered appropriately.

As a result of the analysis of satellite images, it was found out that the irrigation canal was seriously damaged in two parts during the war, and the use of the canal in this condition without repair works continues to pose a formidable challenge to about 400,000 people. Also, the massive use of artesian wells instead of reservoirs after the war was found to not fully meet the demand for drinking water. According to Marković's report, despite the large volume of water in the canals in the winter months, Azerbaijanis continue to use artesian and tank water even during that period due to concerns about the contamination of Sarsang water with hazardous waste and heavy minerals; which in turn creates additional costs and more importantly is dangerous to public health.

Speaking against the draft resolution, the representative of Armenia noted that the rapporteur takes a "one-sided approach" and that they are deeply concerned about it. However, on 26 January 2016, the resolution was adopted by a recorded vote of 98 votes in favour to 71 against, with 40 abstentions.

== Text of resolution ==
The resolution consists of 9 points. In paragraph II, the Assembly reaffirms that it is unacceptable to deliberately deprive innocent citizens of water in order to harm them, stating that water is an "asset of strategic importance". Paragraphs III-IV provide that the occupation of Azerbaijani territories by Armenia has created "an artificial environmental crisis" for the Azerbaijanis living in the Lower Karabakh Valley, and this activity should be considered "environmental aggression" and "a hostile act" by one member state against another. Further emphasis is added to the threatening fact that the reservoir has not been repaired for more than 20 years.

Taking into account the urgent nature of the current situation, PACE makes two important demands in the following provisions: the immediate withdrawal of the Armenian Armed Forces from the region and the cessation of the use of water resources by the Armenian authorities as a means to the benefit of only one of the parties to the conflict. Under the resolution, the fulfillment of the first requirement could enable an on-site investigation with the participation of independent engineers and hydrologists, global management of the water basins in the area and international monitoring of the condition of the irrigation canals in the region, as well as the Sarsang and Madagiz dams.

Finally, the Assembly "calls on all sides concerned to step up their efforts to co-operate closely in the joint management of the resources of the Sarsang water reservoir."

== Aftermath ==
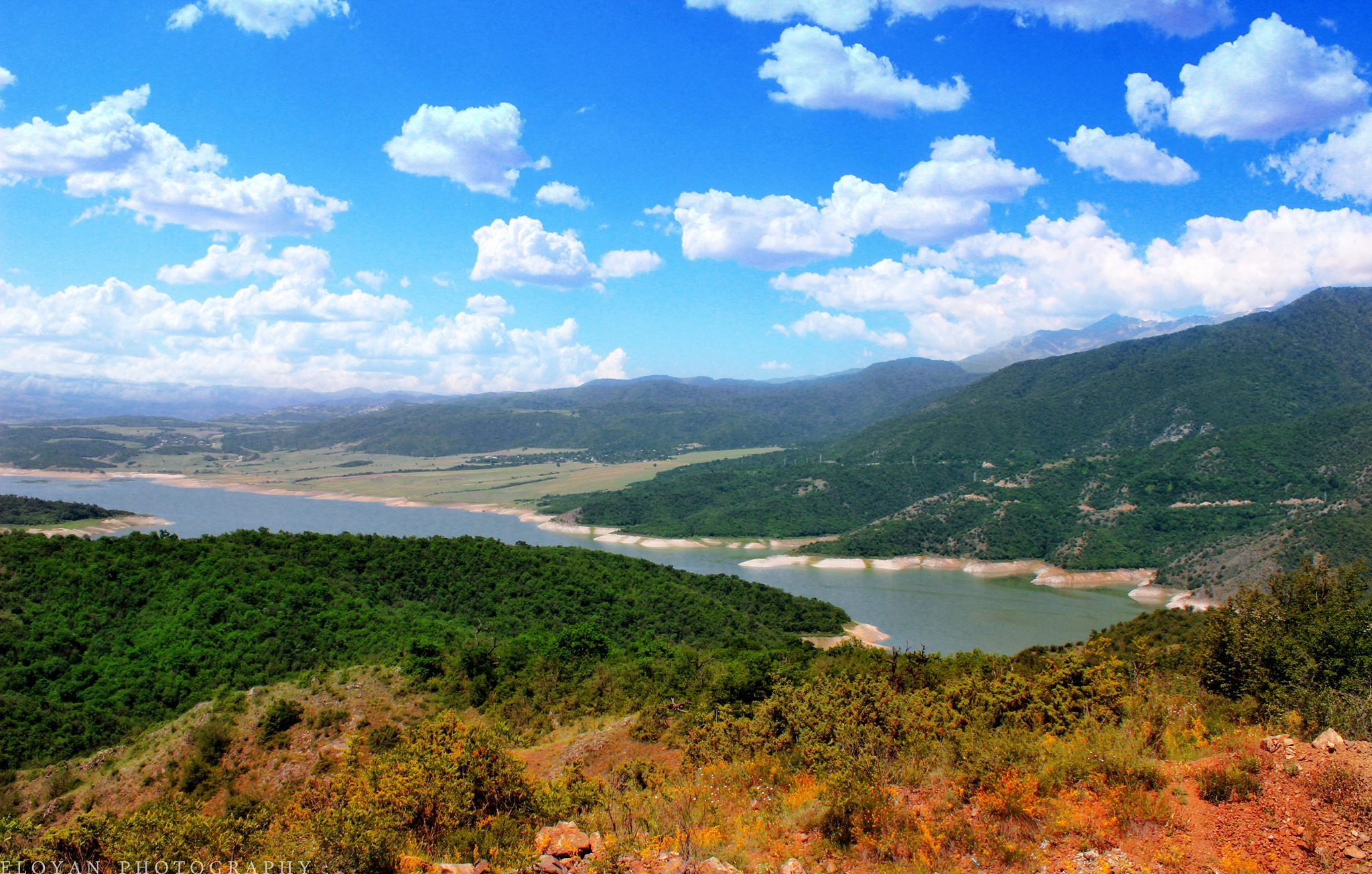
Sarsang Reservoir (2019)

Four days before the adoption of the resolution, the Co-Chairs of the OSCE Minsk Group made a statement to the press, emphasising that the group "remains the only accepted format for negotiations" and urged the PACE members not to take steps that "could undermine the Minsk Group’s mandate." Notwithstanding the adoption of the resolution, the Armenian government denounced this document as a propaganda trick, insisting that the reservoir meets international standards. In 2018, the news appeared in the Armenian press regarding the foreign investment worth 100 million dollars for the construction of a new canal in the Sarsang Reservoir. ICESCO condemned this step of Armenia, which could cause floods and droughts in other areas of Azerbaijan, and qualified the corresponding actions as "exploiting Azerbaijan’s natural resources".

During the Second Nagorno-Karabakh War, on 3 October 2020, the Azerbaijani forces took control of the Sugovushan Reservoir. Sarsang Reservoir was under the temporary control of Russian peacekeepers after the tripartite ceasefire agreement, signed on 9 November 2020, which ended the war. In 2022, the Azerbaijani Army conducted an operation called "Revenge", as a result of which Mount Buzlug was liberated. This success consolidated Azerbaijan's position in terms of the visual observation of the Sarsang Reservoir. A few weeks after this operation, on 23 August, the staff of Azerbaijan Amelioration and Water Farm Company, together with the Armenian exploiters, inspected the reservoir based on mutual agreement and discussed the distribution of water and the restoration of water supply to the districts located in the Lower Karabakh Valley. Although the parties developed a constructive framework on the issue after this meeting, in December, Azerbaijan's "Ecofront" public organization disseminated information about the installation of 3 water collection devices by Armenians in the upper tributary of Turagaychay, as a result of which the flow of the river was diverted to Sarsang and the water volume in Sugovushan was reduced. The following year, in the information released by the Ministry of Foreign Affairs of Azerbaijan, it was reported that during the occupation, Armenia constructed at least 37 additional hydroelectric plants without permission. Based on this, on 27 February 2023, Azerbaijan lodged an interstate arbitration claim against Armenia under the Energy Charter Treaty, demanding financial compensation for contravention of Azerbaijan's sovereign rights to energy resources, including but not limited to Sarsang Hydro Power Plant, during almost 30 years of occupation by the latter.

== See also ==
- Sarsang Reservoir
- Sarsang Hydro Power Plant
