= Water Museum (Bangladesh) =

Museum in Bangladesh

- Established: 29 December 2014
- Location: Kalapara Upazila, Patuakhali District
- Coordinates: 21.9441°N 90.1726°E

The Water Museum (Bengali: পানি জাদুঘর) is located in Kalapara Upazila, in the Patuakhali District of Bangladesh, and was established by the NGO ActionAid on December 29, 2014. Its aim is to showcase the river-centric livelihoods and culture of the people of Bangladesh.

== Collection ==
This museum contains various information, including the history of the 800 rivers of Bangladesh, including water samples from 87 trans-boundary rivers, in addition to pictures of rivers, the history of river water, and the adverse effects on the environment due to climate change. There are also various examples of fishing equipment from rural Bengal, records of songs about rivers, and rural arts. There are utensils made of bronze and clay.

There is also discussion of the history of 57 international rivers that share the same borders with Bangladesh, which are currently recognised as trans-boundary rivers under international law. While there are 150 rivers that cross the Bangladeshi border, only 57 are recognised, and Bangladesh, Myanmar, and India are yet to ratify the UN Watercourses Convention approved by the UN General Assembly in 1997. ActionAid proposed a list of demands to help preserve Bangladesh's international waterways and river related heritage, which are known as the "Kuakata Declaration". The museum contains a number of infographics on the declaration and its proposed benefits, and shows maps of Bangladesh's river network.

They also hold a library of river-related research, books, and documentaries.
