= Nagorno-Karabakh =

Geopolitical region in Azerbaijan

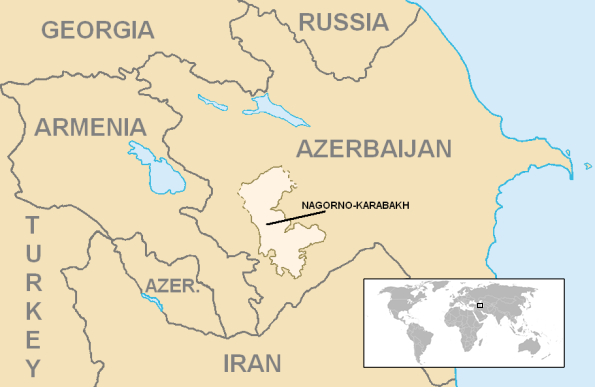
- Location and extent of the former Nagorno-Karabakh Autonomous Oblast (lighter color)

Area
  - Total: 4,400 km^{2} (1,700 sq mi)
  - Water (%): negligible

Population
  - 2013 estimate: 146,573
  - 2010 census: 141,400
  - Density: 29/km^{2} (75.1/sq mi)
- Time zone: UTC+4

Nagorno-Karabakh (/nəˌɡɔːrnoʊ kərəˈbɑːk/, nə-GOR-noh kər-ə-BAHK; lit. 'Upper Karabakh') is a region located within the territory of present-day Azerbaijan, covering the southeastern stretch of the Lesser Caucasus mountain range. Part of the greater region of Karabakh, it spans the area between Lower Karabakh and Syunik. Its terrain mostly consists of mountains and forestland.

Most of Nagorno-Karabakh was governed by ethnic Armenians under the breakaway Republic of Artsakh – also known as the Nagorno-Karabakh Republic (NKR) – from the end of the first Nagorno-Karabakh War between Armenia and Azerbaijan in 1994 to the announcement of the dissolution of the republic in September 2023. Representatives from the two sides held numerous inconclusive peace talks mediated by the OSCE Minsk Group regarding the region's disputed status, with its majority-Armenian population over time variously advocating either for Artsakh's independence from both states or for its integration into Armenia.

The region is usually equated with the administrative borders of the former Nagorno-Karabakh Autonomous Oblast (NKAO), comprising 4,400 km^{2} (1,700 sq mi); however, the region's historical extent encompasses approximately 8,223 km^{2} (3,175 sq mi).

On 27 September 2020, the Second Nagorno-Karabakh War broke out with an Azerbaijani offensive in Nagorno-Karabakh and the surrounding territories. Azerbaijan made significant gains during the war, regaining all of the occupied territories surrounding Nagorno-Karabakh and capturing one-third of Nagorno-Karabakh, including Shusha and Hadrut. The war ended on 10 November 2020 when a trilateral ceasefire agreement was signed between Azerbaijan, Armenia, and Russia, under which all the remaining occupied territories surrounding Nagorno-Karabakh were formally returned to Azerbaijani control. The Republic of Artsakh became an isolated rump state connected with Armenia only by the narrow Lachin corridor, which was controlled by Russia.

On 19 September 2023, after a blockade lasting several months, Azerbaijan launched a fresh large-scale military offensive in Nagorno-Karabakh. The Artsakh forces collapsed rapidly, resulting in an Azerbaijani victory, the dissolution of the Republic of Artsakh, the forced mass removal of almost the entire Armenian population from the region, and the entry of Azerbaijani security forces into the former Artsakh capital of Stepanakert, known as Khankendi by Azerbaijan. On 1 January 2024, the Republic of Artsakh was formally dissolved, marking the end of a millennia-old Armenian presence in Nagorno-Karabakh. Various political analysts, along with residents of Nagorno-Karabakh, accused Azerbaijan of committing ethnic cleansing.

== Etymology ==
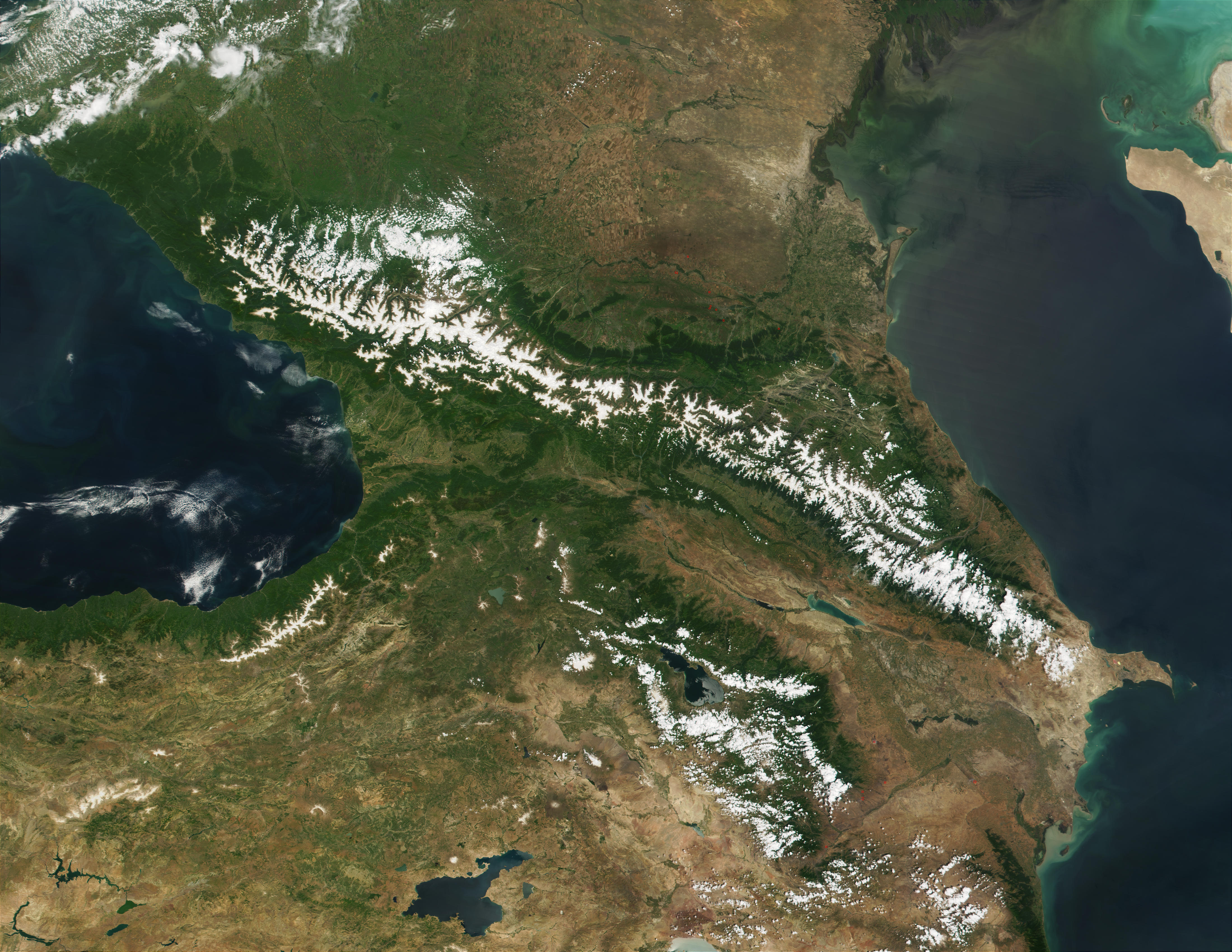
June 2001 NASA photograph of the snow-covered Lesser Caucasus to the south of the Greater Caucasus. Around the year 1800, the Karabakh Khanate was based in the southeast corner of the Lesser Caucasus. It extended east into the lowlands, hence the name Nagorno- or "Highland-" Karabakh for the western part.

The prefix Nagorno- derives from the Russian attributive adjective nagorny (нагорный), which means "highland". The Azerbaijani names of the region include the similar adjectives dağlıq (mountainous) or yuxarı (upper). Such words are not used in the Armenian name, but appeared in the region's official name during the Soviet era as Nagorno-Karabakh Autonomous Oblast. Other languages apply their own wording for mountainous, upper, or highland; for example, the official name used for the Nagorno-Karabakh Republic in French is Haut-Karabakh, meaning "Upper Karabakh".

The names for the region in the various local languages all translate to "mountainous Karabakh", or "mountainous black garden":

- Armenian: Լեռնային Ղարաբաղ, transliterated Leṙnayin Ġarabaġ, pronounced [lɛrnɑˈjin ʁɑɾɑˈbɑʁ]
- Azerbaijani: Dağlıq Qarabağ, Дағлыг Гарабағ, lit. 'mountainous Karabakh', pronounced [dɑɣˈlɯɣ ɡɑˈɾɑbɑɣ]
  or Yuxarı Qarabağ, Јухары Гарабағ, lit. 'upper Karabakh', pronounced [juxɑˈɾɯ ɡɑˈɾɑbɑɣ]
- Russian: Нагорный Карабах, transliterated Nagorny Karabakh, pronounced [nɐˈɡornɨj kərɐˈbax]

Armenians call Nagorno-Karabakh Artsakh (Armenian: Արցախ) Urartian inscriptions (9th–7th centuries BC) use the name Urtekhini for the region. Ancient Greek sources called the area Orkhistene.

== History ==
=== Antiquity and Early Middle Ages ===
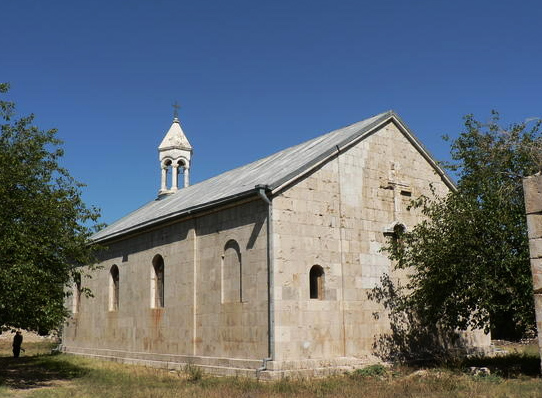
The Amaras Monastery, founded in the 4th century by St Gregory the Illuminator. In the 5th century, Mesrop Mashtots, inventor of the Armenian alphabet, established at Amaras the first school to use his script.

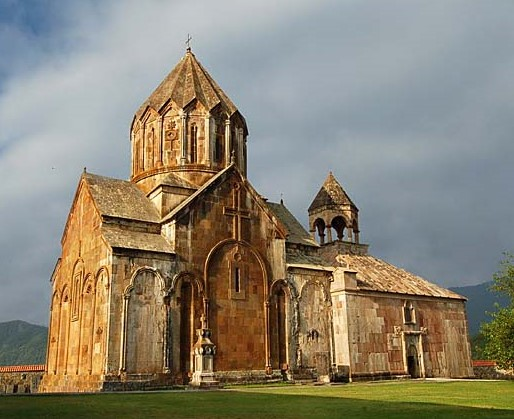
The monastery at Gandzasar was commissioned by the House of Khachen and completed in 1238

Nagorno-Karabakh falls within the lands occupied by peoples known to modern archaeologists as the Kura-Araxes culture who lived between the two rivers Kura and Araxes.

The ancient population of the region consisted of various autochthonous local and migrant tribes who were mostly non-Indo-Europeans. According to the prevailing western theory, these natives intermarried with Armenians who came to the region after its inclusion into Armenia in the 2nd (or possibly earlier, the 4th) century BC. Other scholars suggest that the Armenians settled in the region as early as the 7th century BC.

Around 180 BC, Artsakh became one of the 15 provinces of the Armenian Kingdom and remained so until the 4th century. While formally having the status of a province (nahang), Artsakh possibly formed a principality on its own – like Armenia's province of Syunik. Other theories suggest that Artsakh was a royal land, belonging directly to the king of Armenia. King Tigran the Great of Armenia (who ruled from 95 to 55 BC) founded in Artsakh one of four cities named Tigranakert after himself. The ruins of the ancient Tigranakert, located 50 km (30 mi) north-east of Stepanakert, are being studied by a group of international scholars.

In 387 AD, after the partition of Armenia between the Roman Empire and Sassanid Persia, two Armenian provinces – Artsakh and Utik – became part of the Sassanid satrapy of Caucasian Albania, which in turn came under strong Armenian religious and cultural influence. At the time the population of Artsakh and Utik consisted of Armenians and several Armenized tribes.

Armenian culture and civilization flourished in the early medieval Nagorno-Karabakh. In the 5th century, the first-ever Armenian school was opened on the territory of modern Nagorno-Karabakh at Amaras Monastery through the efforts of St. Mesrop Mashtots, the inventor of the Armenian alphabet. St. Mesrop was very active in preaching the Gospel in Artsakh and Utik. Overall, Mesrop Mashtots made three trips to Artsakh and Utik, ultimately reaching pagan territories at the foothills of the Greater Caucasus. The 7th-century Armenian linguist and grammarian Stephanos Syunetsi stated in his work that Armenians of Artsakh had their own dialect, and encouraged his readers to learn it.

=== High Middle Ages ===
Around the mid 7th century, the region was conquered by the invading Muslim Arabs through the Muslim conquest of Persia. Subsequently, it was ruled by local governors endorsed by the Caliphate. According to some sources, in 821 the Armenian prince Sahl Smbatian revolted in Artsakh and established the House of Khachen, which ruled Artsakh as a principality until the early 19th century. According to other sources, Sahl Smbatian "was of the Zamirhakan family of kings", and in the year 837–838 he acquired sovereignty over Armenia, Georgia, and Albania. The name "Khachen" originated from Armenian word khach, which means "cross". By 1000 the House of Khachen proclaimed the Kingdom of Artsakh with John Senecherib as its first ruler. Initially Dizak in southern Artsakh also formed a kingdom ruled by the ancient House of Aranshahik, descended from the earliest Kings of Caucasian Albania. In 1261, after the daughter of the last king of Dizak married the king of Artsakh, Armenian prince Hasan Jalal Dola, the two states merged into one Armenian Principality of Khachen. Subsequently, Artsakh continued to exist as a de facto independent principality.

=== Late Middle Ages ===
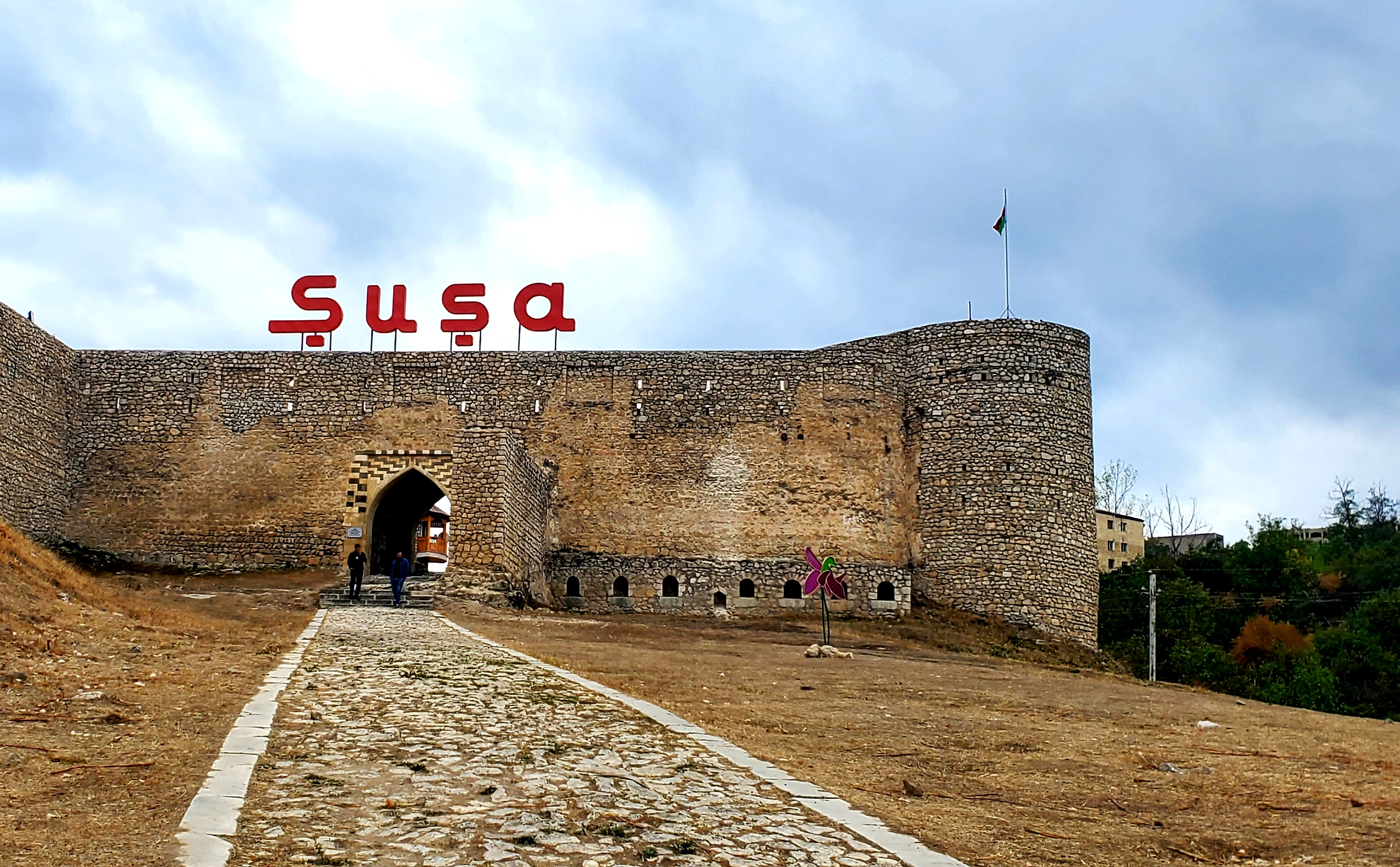
The Shusha fortress, built by the Karabakh Khanate ruler Panah Ali Khan in the 18th century

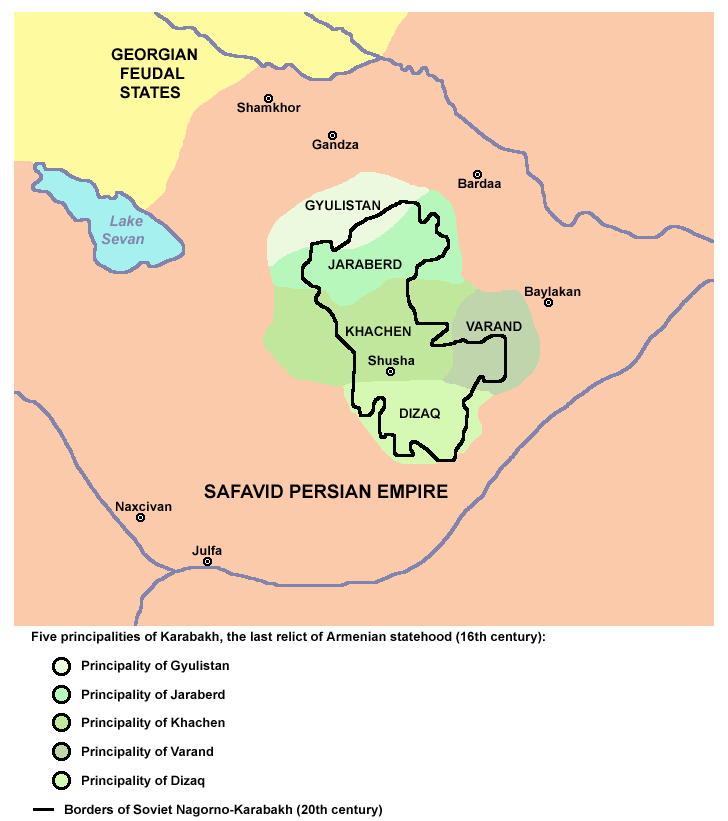
The semi-independent Five Principalities (Armenian: Խամսայի Մելիքություններ) of Karabakh (Gyulistan, Jraberd, Khachen, Varanda, and Dizak), widely considered to be the last relic of Armenian statehood (15th–19th century).

In the 15th century, the territory of Karabakh was part of the states ruled subsequently by the Kara Koyunlu and Ak Koyunlu Turkic tribal confederations. According to Abu Bakr Tihrani, during the period of Jahan Shah (1438–1468), the ruler of Kara Koyunlu, Piri bey Karamanli held the governorship of Karabakh. However, according to Robert H. Hewsen, the Turkoman lord Jahan Shah (1437–1467) assigned the governorship of upper Karabakh to local Armenian princes, allowing a native Armenian leadership to emerge consisting of five noble families led by princes who held the titles of meliks. These dynasties represented the branches of the earlier House of Khachen and were the descendants of the medieval kings of Artsakh. Their lands were often referred to as the Country of Khamsa ('five' in Arabic). In a Charter (2 June 1799) of the Emperor Paul I titled "About their admission to Russian suzerainty, land allocation, rights and privileges", it was noted that the Christian heritage of the Karabakh region and all their people were admitted to the Russian suzerainty. However, according to Robert Hewsen, the Russian Empire recognised the sovereign status of the five princes in their domains by the charter of Emperor Paul I dated 2 June 1799.

The Armenian meliks were granted supreme command over neighbouring Armenian principalities and Muslim khans in the Caucasus by the Iranian king Nader Shah, in return for the meliks' victories over the invading Ottoman Turks in the 1720s. These five principalities in Karabakh were ruled by Armenian families who had received the title Melik (prince) and were the following:

- Principality of Gulistan – under the leadership of the Melik-Beglarian family
- Principality of Jraberd – under the leadership of the Melik-Israelian family
- Principality of Khachen – under the leadership of the Hasan-Jalalian family
- Principality of Varanda – under the leadership of the Melik-Shahnazarian family
- Principality of Dizak – under the leadership of the Melik-Avanian family

From 1501 to 1736, during the existence of the Safavid Empire, the province of Karabakh was governed by the Ziyadoghlu Qajar dynasty, until Nader Shah took over Karabakh from their rule. The Armenian meliks maintained full control over the region until the mid-18th century. In the early 18th century, Iran's Nader Shah took Karabakh out of control of the Ganja khans in punishment for their support of the Safavids, and placed it under his own control In the mid-18th century, as internal conflicts between the meliks led to their weakening, the Karabakh Khanate was formed. The Karabakh khanate, one of the largest khanates under Iranian suzerainty, was headed by Panah-Ali khan Javanshir. For the reinforcement of the power of Karabakh khanate, Khan of Karabakh, Panah-Ali khan Javanshir, built up "the fortress of Panahabad (today Shusha)" in 1751. During that time, Otuziki, Javanshir, Kebirli, and other Turkic tribes constituted the majority of the overall population.

=== Modern era ===
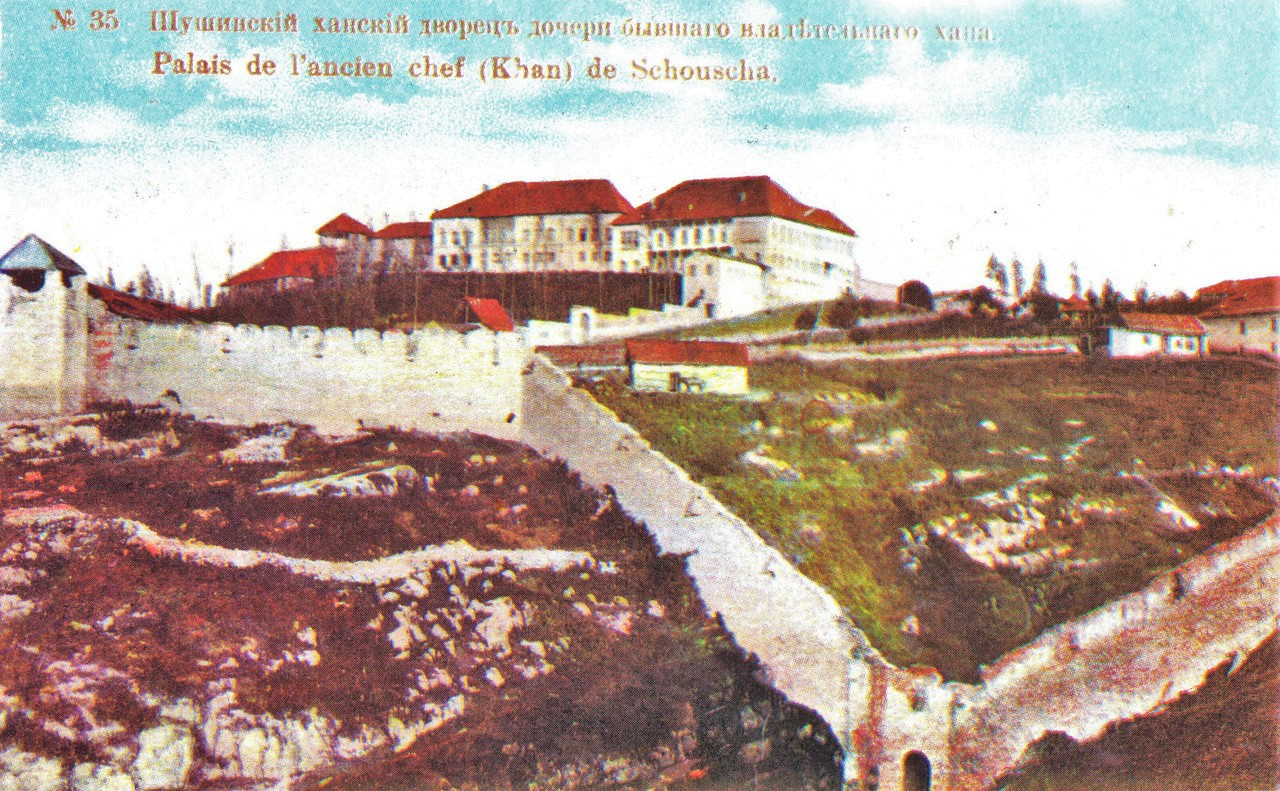
Palace of the former ruler (khan) of Shusha. Taken from a postcard from the late 19th–early 20th century.

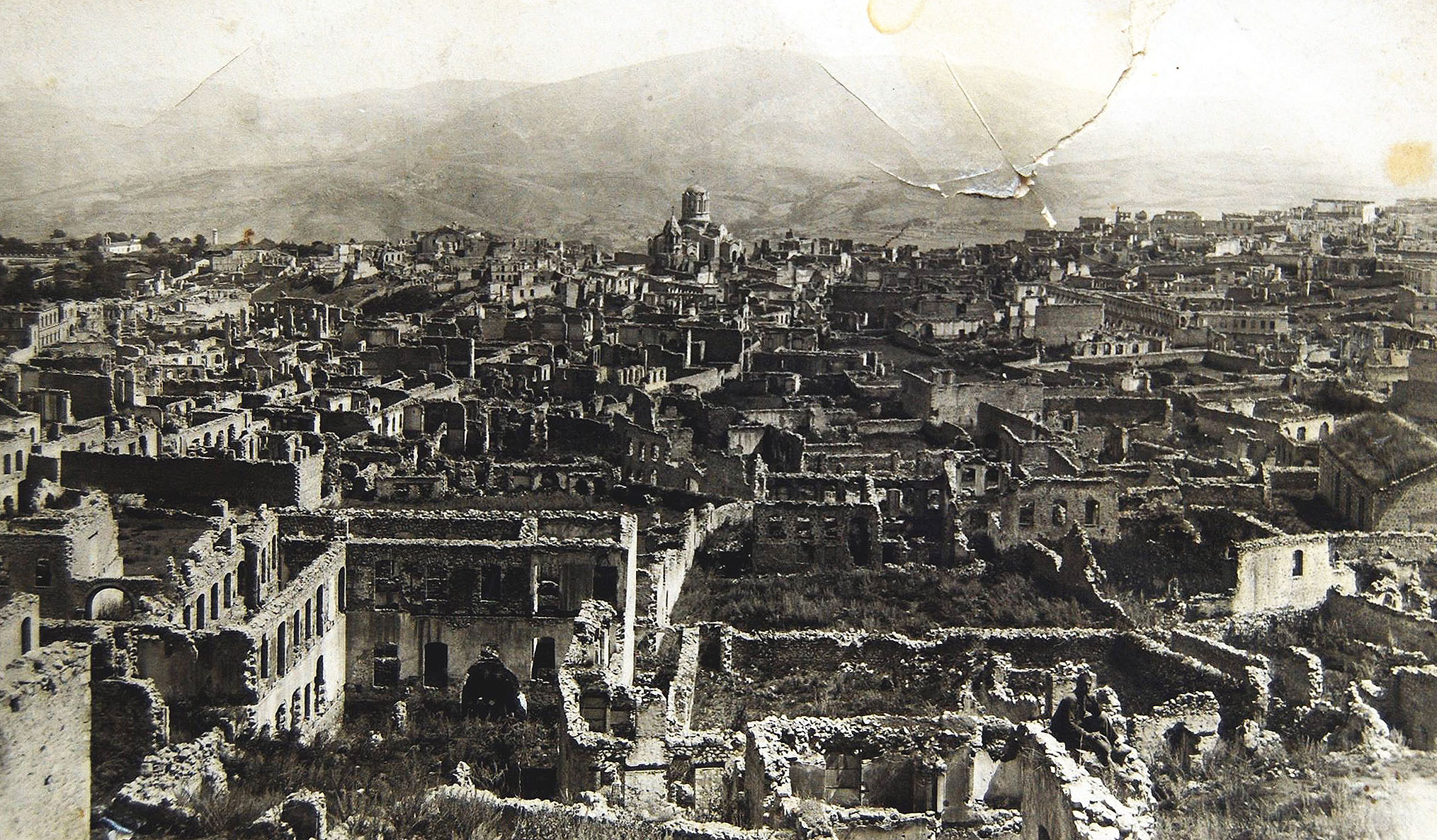
Aftermath of the Shusha massacre: Armenian half of Shusha destroyed by Azerbaijani armed forces in 1920, with the defiled Armenian Cathedral of the Holy Savior in the background.

Karabakh (including modern-day Nagorno-Karabakh), became a protectorate of the Russian Empire by the Kurekchay Treaty, signed between Ibrahim Khalil Khan of Karabakh and general Pavel Tsitsianov on behalf of Tsar Alexander I in 1805, according to which the Russian monarch recognized Ibrahim Khalil Khan and his descendants as the sole hereditary rulers of the region. However, its new status was only confirmed following the outcome of the Russo-Persian War (1804-1813), when through the loss in the war, Persia formally ceded Karabakh to the Russian Empire per the Treaty of Gulistan (1813), before the rest of Transcaucasia was incorporated into the Empire in 1828 by the Treaty of Turkmenchay, which came as an outcome of the Russo-Persian War (1826-1828).

In 1822, 9 years after it passed from Iranian to Russian control, the Karabakh Khanate was dissolved and the area became part of the Elizavetpol Governorate within the Russian Empire. In 1823 the five districts corresponding roughly to modern-day Nagorno-Karabakh were 90.8% Armenian-populated.

=== Soviet era ===
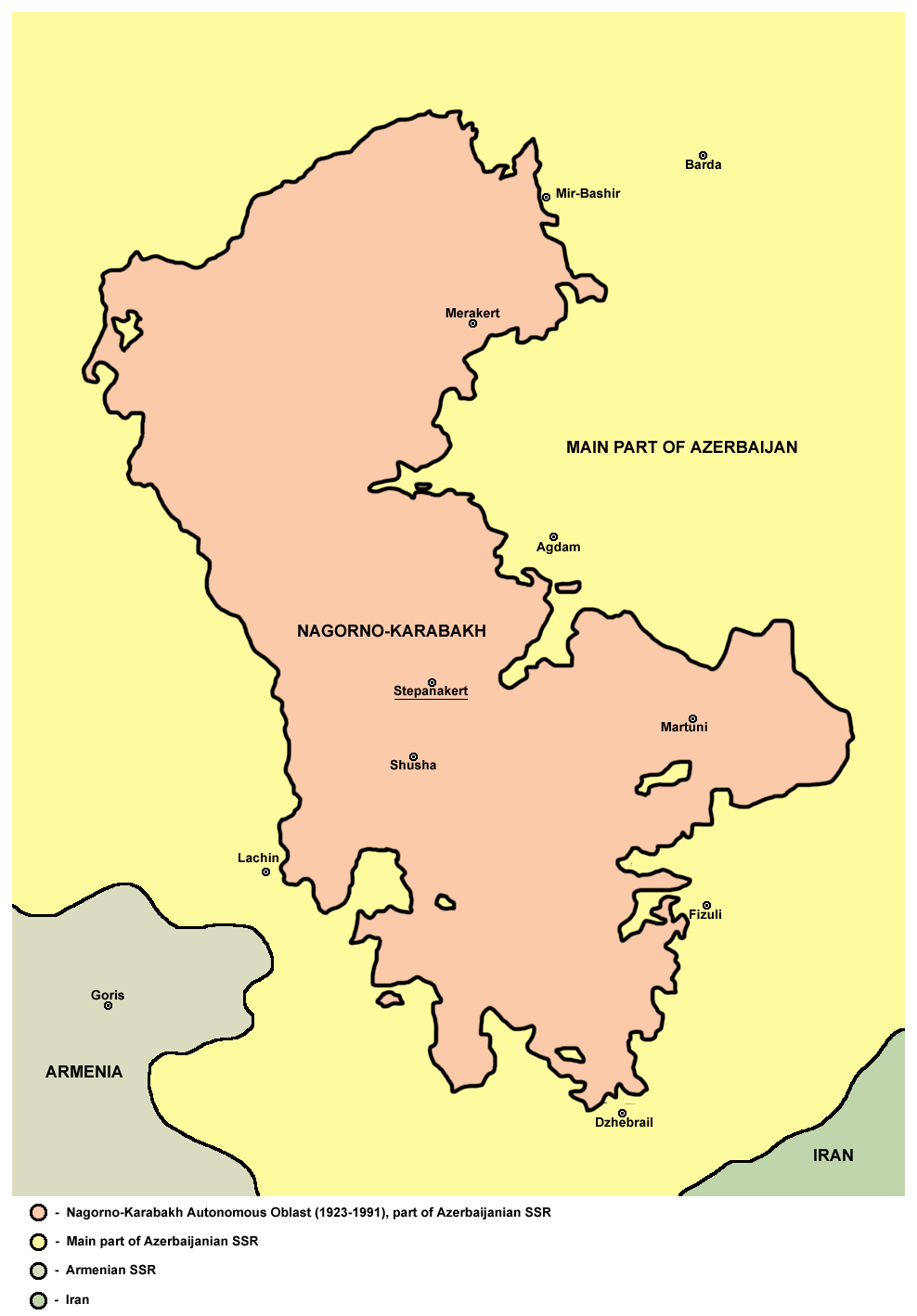
Nagorno-Karabakh Autonomous Oblast in the Soviet era.

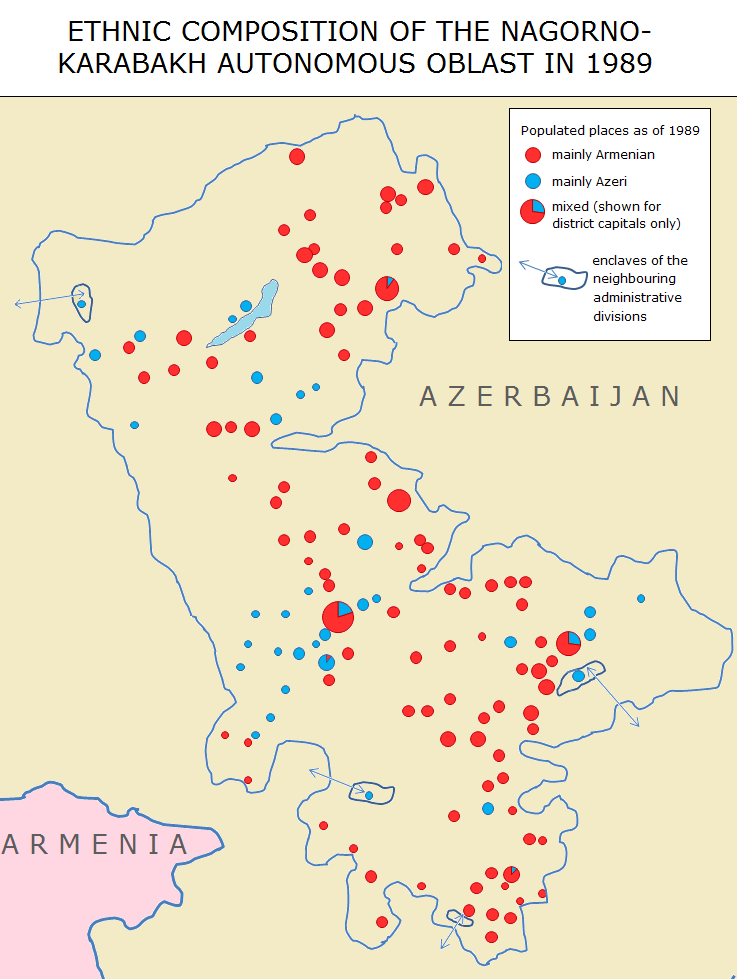
Ethnic make-up of Nagorno-Karabakh in the late Soviet era.

After the October Revolution, Karabakh became part of the Transcaucasian Democratic Federative Republic, but this soon dissolved into separate Armenian, Azerbaijani, and Georgian states. Over the next two years (1918–1920), there were a series of short wars between Armenia and Azerbaijan over several regions, including Nagorno-Karabakh. Between 1918 and 1920, Nagorno-Karabakh's de jure affiliation with Armenia or Azerbaijan was disputed and not adjudicated by the League of Nations.

In July 1918, the First Armenian Assembly of Nagorno-Karabakh declared the region self-governing and created a National Council and government. Later, Ottoman Army troops entered Karabakh, meeting armed resistance by Armenians.

After the defeat of the Ottoman Empire in World War I, British Army troops occupied Karabakh. The British command provisionally affirmed Khosrov bey Sultanov (appointed by the Azerbaijani government) as the governor-general of Karabakh and Zangezur, pending a final decision by the Paris Peace Conference. The decision was opposed by Karabakh Armenians. In February 1920, the Karabakh National Council preliminarily agreed to Azerbaijani jurisdiction, while Armenians elsewhere in Karabakh continued guerrilla fighting, never accepting the agreement. The agreement itself was soon annulled by the Ninth Karabagh Assembly, which declared union with Armenia in April.

In April 1920, while the Azerbaijani army was locked in Karabakh fighting local Armenian forces, Azerbaijan was taken over by Bolsheviks. On 10 August 1920, Armenia signed a preliminary agreement with the Bolsheviks, agreeing to a temporary Bolshevik occupation of these areas until final settlement would be reached. In 1921, Armenia and Georgia were also taken over by the Bolsheviks. After the Sovietization of Armenia and Azerbaijan, the Kavbiuro (Caucasian Bureau of the Central Committee of the Russian Communist Party (Bolshevik)) decided that Karabakh would remain within Azerbaijan SSR with broad regional autonomy, with the administrative centre in the city of Shusha (the administrative centre was later moved to Stepanakert). The oblast's borders were drawn to include Armenian villages and to exclude as much as possible Azerbaijani villages. The resulting district ensured an Armenian majority.

With the Soviet Union firmly in control of the region, the conflict over the region died down for several decades until the beginning of the dissolution of the Soviet Union in the late 1980s and early 1990s, when the question of Nagorno-Karabakh re-emerged. Accusing the Azerbaijani SSR government of conducting forced Azerification of the region, the majority Armenian population, with ideological and material support from the Armenian SSR, started a movement to have the autonomous oblast transferred to the Armenian SSR. In August 1987, Karabakh Armenians sent a petition for union with Armenia with tens of thousands of signatures to Moscow.

=== War and secession ===
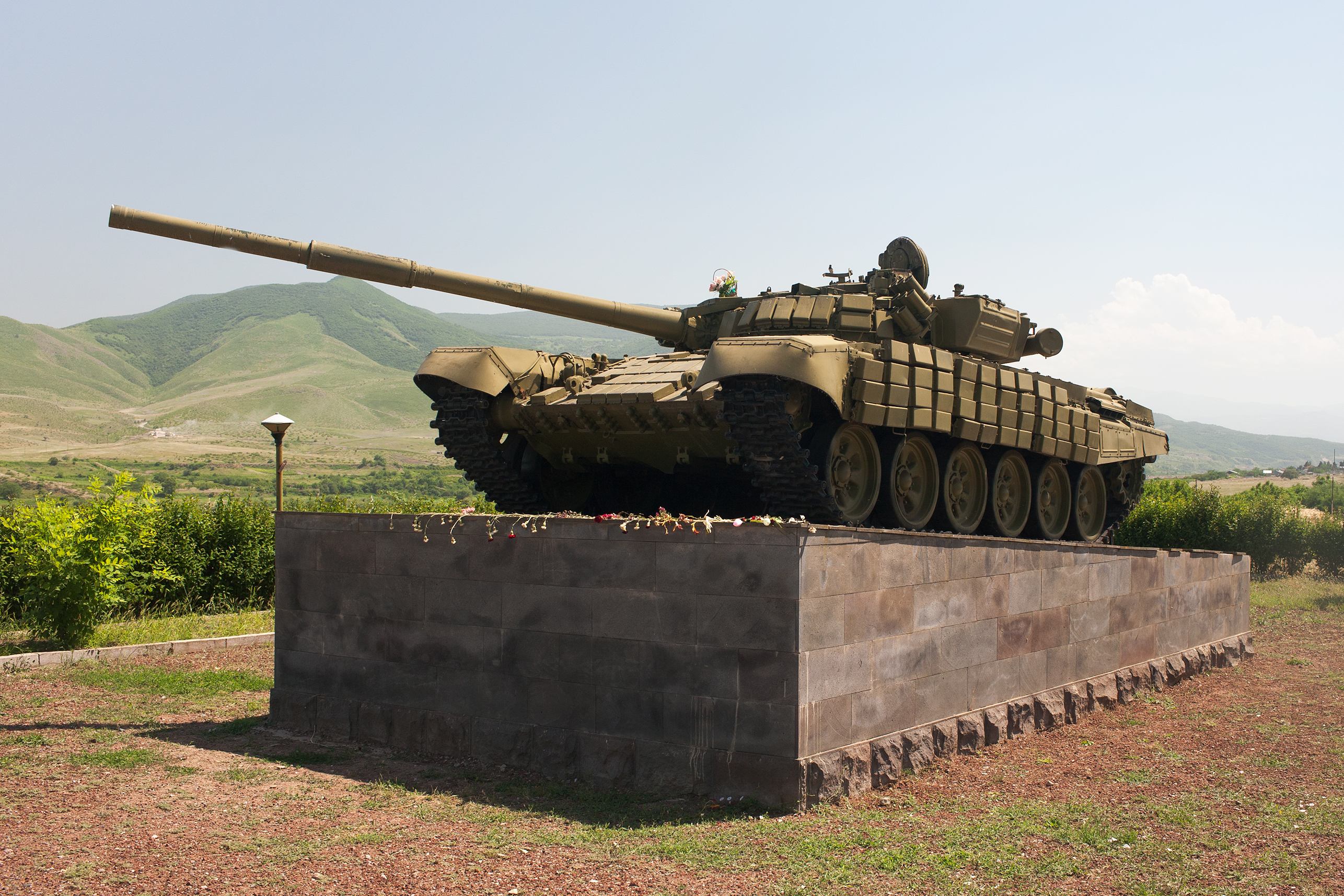
A restored Armenian T-72, knocked out of commission while attacking Azeri positions in Askeran District, serves as a war memorial on the outskirts of Stepanakert.

On 13 February 1988, Karabakh Armenians began demonstrating in Stepanakert, in favour of unification with the Armenian republic. Six days later they were joined by mass marches in Yerevan. On 20 February, the Soviet of People's Deputies in Karabakh voted 110 to 17 to request the transfer of the region to Armenia. This unprecedented action by a regional Soviet brought out tens of thousands of demonstrations both in Stepanakert and Yerevan, but Moscow rejected the Armenians' demands. The confrontation between the Azeris and the police near Askeran degenerated into the Askeran clash, which left two Azeris dead, one of them allegedly killed by an Azeri police officer. Fifty Armenian villagers and an unknown number of Azeris and police officers were injured. Large numbers of refugees left Armenia and Azerbaijan as violence began against the minority populations of the respective republics. On 7 July 1988, the European Parliament passed a resolution that condemned the violence employed against Armenian demonstrators in Azerbaijan, and supported the demand of the Armenians for reunification with the Soviet Republic of Armenia.

On 29 November 1989, direct rule in Nagorno-Karabakh was ended and the region was returned to Azerbaijani administration. The Soviet policy backfired, however, when a joint session of the Armenian Supreme Soviet and the National Council, the legislative body of Nagorno-Karabakh, proclaimed the unification of Nagorno-Karabakh with Armenia. On 26 November 1991 Azerbaijan abolished the status of Nagorno-Karabakh Autonomous Oblast, rearranging the administrative division and bringing the territory under direct control of Azerbaijan.

On 10 December 1991, in a referendum boycotted by local Azerbaijanis, Armenians in Nagorno-Karabakh approved the creation of an independent state. A Soviet proposal for enhanced autonomy for Nagorno-Karabakh within Azerbaijan satisfied neither side and a full-scale war subsequently erupted between Azerbaijan and Nagorno-Karabakh, with the latter receiving support from Armenia. According to Armenia's former president, Levon Ter-Petrossian, the Karabakh leadership approach was maximalist and "they thought they could get more."

The struggle over Nagorno-Karabakh escalated after both Armenia and Azerbaijan attained independence from the Soviet Union in 1991. In the post-Soviet power vacuum, military action between Azerbaijan and Armenia was heavily influenced by the Russian military. Furthermore, both the Armenian and Azerbaijani military employed a large number of mercenaries from Ukraine and Russia. Between fifteen and twenty-five hundred Afghan mujahideen, along with fighters from Chechnya, participated in the fighting on Azerbaijan's side. Russia provided Armenia with heavy artillery and tanks. Many survivors from the Azerbaijani side found shelter in 12 emergency camps set up in other parts of Azerbaijan to cope with the growing number of internally displaced people due to the first Nagorno-Karabakh war.

By the end of 1993, the conflict had caused about 30,000 casualties and created hundreds of thousands of refugees on both sides. By May 1994, the Armenians were in control of 14% of the territory of Azerbaijan. At that stage, for the first time during the conflict, the Azerbaijani government recognized Nagorno-Karabakh as a third party in the war and started direct negotiations with the Karabakh authorities. As a result, a ceasefire was reached on 12 May 1994 through Russian mediation.

=== Post-1994 ceasefire ===
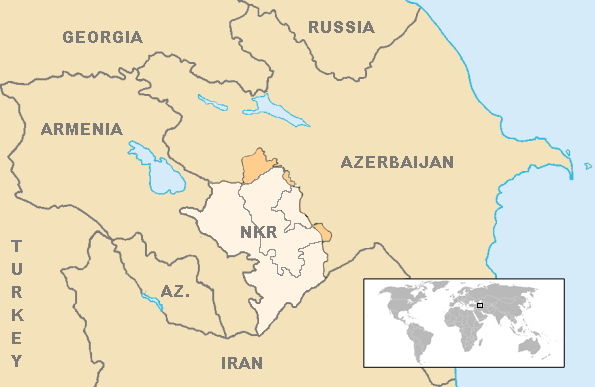
The final borders of the conflict after the Bishkek Protocol. Armenian forces of Nagorno-Karabakh controlled almost 9% of Azerbaijan's territory outside the former Nagorno-Karabakh Autonomous Oblast, while Azerbaijani forces control Shahumian and the eastern parts of Martakert and Martuni.

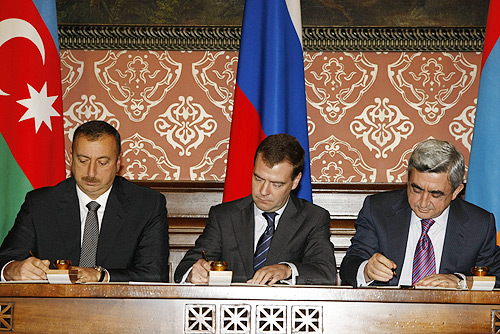
Ilham Aliyev, Dmitry Medvedev and Serzh Sargsyan in Moscow on 2 November 2008

Despite the ceasefire, fatalities due to armed conflicts between Armenian and Azerbaijani soldiers continued. On 25 January 2005, the Parliamentary Assembly of the Council of Europe (PACE) adopted PACE Resolution 1416, which condemned ethnic cleansing against Azerbaijanis. On 15–17 May 2007 the 34th session of the Council of Ministers of Foreign Affairs of the Organization of Islamic Conference adopted resolution No. 7/34-P, considering the occupation of Azerbaijani territory as the aggression of Armenia against Azerbaijan and recognizing the actions against Azerbaijani civilians as a crime against humanity, and condemning the destruction of archaeological, cultural and religious monuments in the occupied territories. The 11th session of the summit of the Organization of the Islamic Conference held on 13–14 March 2008 in Dakar adopted resolution No. 10/11-P (IS). In the resolution, OIC member states condemned the occupation of Azerbaijani lands by Armenian forces and Armenian aggression against Azerbaijan, ethnic cleansing against the Azeri population, and charged Armenia with the "destruction of cultural monuments in the occupied Azerbaijani territories". On 14 March of the same year the UN General Assembly adopted Resolution No. 62/243 which "demands the immediate, complete and unconditional withdrawal of all Armenian forces from all occupied territories of the Republic of Azerbaijan". On 18–20 May 2010, the 37th session of the Council of Ministers of Foreign Affairs of the Organization of Islamic Conference in Dushanbe adopted another resolution condemning the aggression of Armenia against Azerbaijan, recognizing the actions against Azerbaijani civilians as a crime against humanity and condemning the destruction of archaeological, cultural, and religious monuments in occupied territories. On 20 May of the same year, the European Parliament in Strasbourg adopted the resolution on "The need for an EU Strategy for the South Caucasus" on the basis of the report by Evgeni Kirilov, the Bulgarian member of the Parliament. The resolution states in particular that "the occupied Azerbaijani regions around Nagorno-Karabakh must be cleared as soon as possible". On 26 January 2016, the Parliamentary Assembly of the Council of Europe (PACE) adopted Resolution 2085, which deplored the fact that the occupation by Armenia of Nagorno-Karabakh and other adjacent areas of Azerbaijan creates humanitarian and environmental problems for the citizens of Azerbaijan, condemned ethnic cleansing against Azerbaijanis and Assembly requested immediate withdrawal of Armenian armed forces from the region concerned.

Several world leaders have met with the presidents of Armenia and Azerbaijan over the years, but efforts to maintain the ceasefire have failed.

On 2 April 2016 Azerbaijani and Armenian forces again clashed in the region. The Armenian Defense Ministry alleged that Azerbaijan launched an offensive to seize territory in the region. At least 30 soldiers were killed during the fighting and a Mil Mi-24 helicopter and tank were also destroyed, with 12 of the fallen soldiers belonging to the Azerbaijani forces and the other 18 belonging to the Armenian forces, as well as an additional 35 Armenian soldiers reportedly wounded.

=== 2020 war and ceasefire agreement ===
On 27 September 2020, a new war erupted in Nagorno-Karabakh and the surrounding territories. The United Nations strongly condemned the conflict and called on both sides to deescalate tensions and resume meaningful negotiations without delay.

The war ended on 10 November 2020, when a trilateral ceasefire agreement was signed among Azerbaijan, Armenia, and Russia. According to the ceasefire agreement, Azerbaijan regained all of the occupied territories surrounding Nagorno-Karabakh and capturing one-third of Nagorno-Karabakh proper, including Shusha and Hadrut.

=== Blockade (2022–2023) ===
In December 2022, Azerbaijanis claiming to be environmental activists blocked the Lachin corridor, the sole road connecting Nagorno-Karabakh to Armenia and the outside world. On 23 April 2023, Azerbaijani forces installed a checkpoint on the Lachin corridor. The blockade led to a humanitarian crisis for the population in Artsakh and imports of essential goods were blocked, as well as humanitarian convoys of the Red Cross and the Russian peacekeepers, trapping the 120,000 residents of the region. Limited traffic had been conducted by Russian peacekeepers and the International Committee of the Red Cross to transport patients in need of medical care and provide humanitarian supplies. However, starting on 15 June 2023, Azerbaijan intensified the blockade, blocking all passage of food, fuel, and medicine from the Red Cross and the Russian peacekeepers through the Lachin corridor. On 19 September, Azerbaijan launched a military operation.

=== Azerbaijani offensive (2023) ===
On 19 September 2023, Azerbaijan launched a military offensive on Nagorno-Karabakh. One day after the offensive started, on 20 September, an agreement on establishing a complete cessation of hostilities in Nagorno-Karabakh was reached at the mediation of the Russian peacekeeping command in Nagorno-Karabakh. Azerbaijan held a meeting with representatives of the Artsakh Armenian community on 21 September in Yevlakh to start the process of re-integrating the region into Azerbaijan. Ceasefire violations by Azerbaijan were nonetheless reported by both Artsakh and local residents in Stepanakert on 21 September. In the aftermath of the offensive, an exodus of Armenians from the region started. On 28 September 2023, the Republic of Artsakh agreed to dissolve itself by 1 January 2024.

== Geography ==
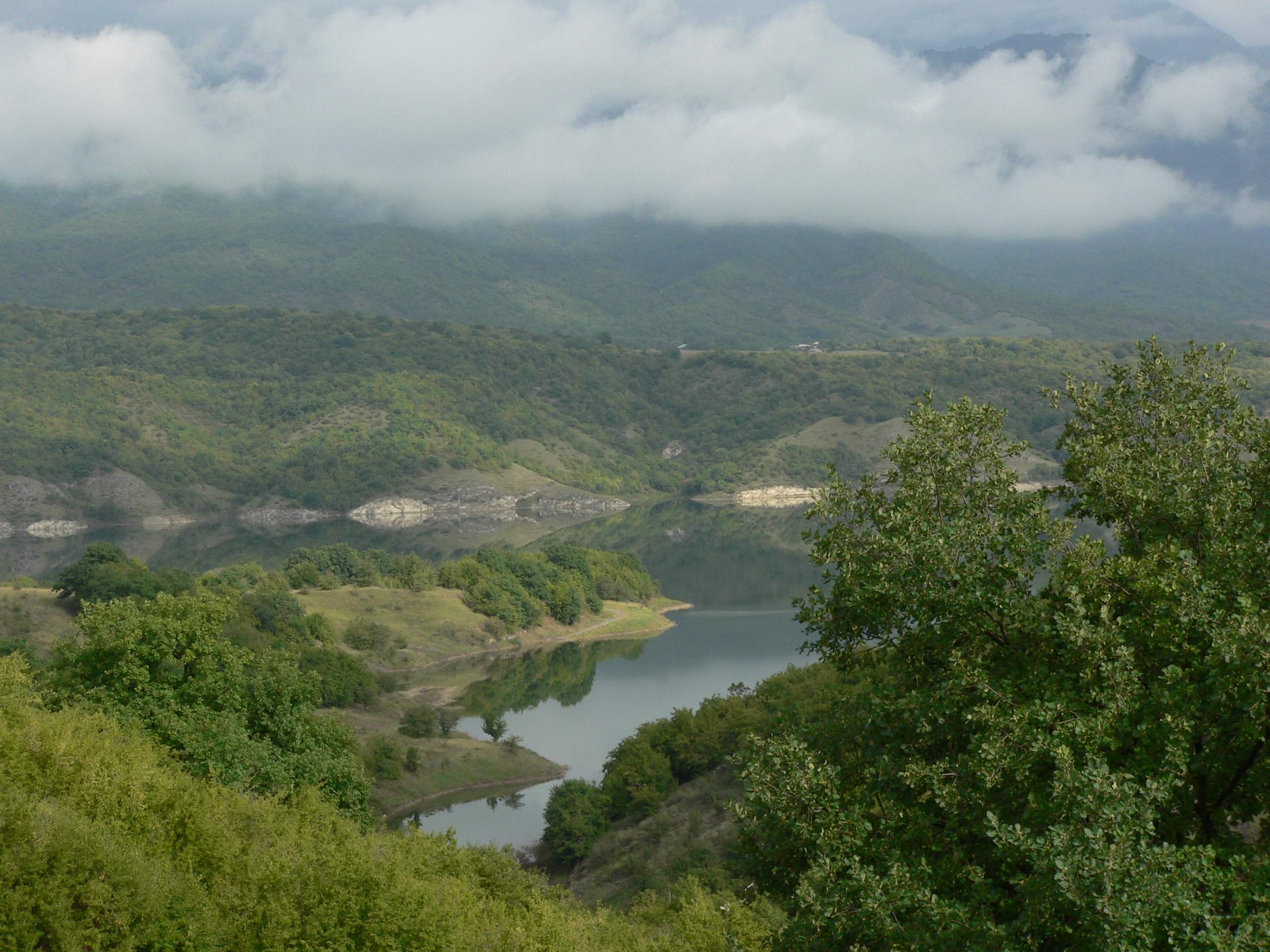
The Sarsang Reservoir

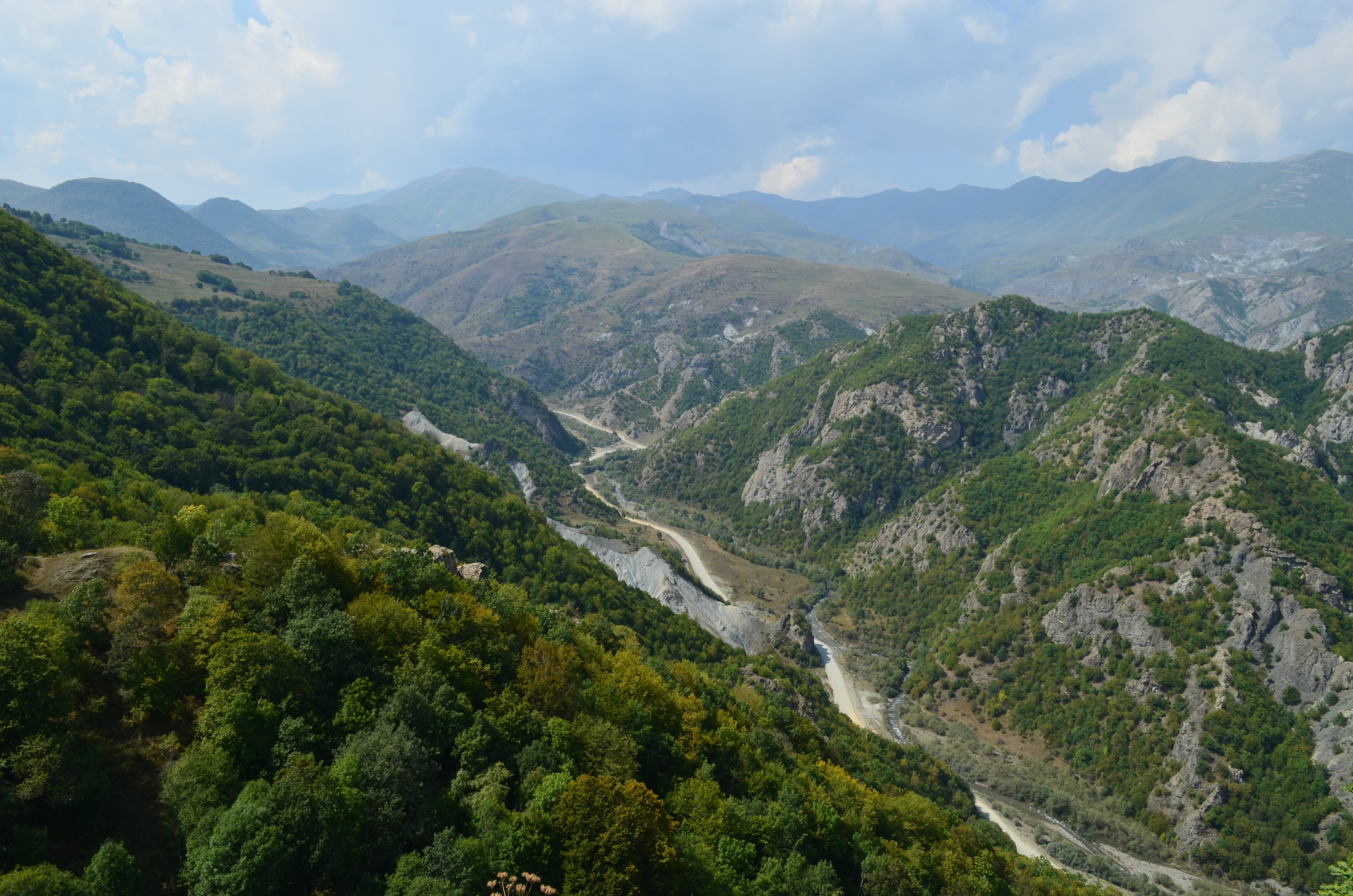
A view of the forested mountains of Nagorno-Karabakh

Nagorno-Karabakh has a total area of 4,400 square kilometres (1,699 sq mi). Approximately half of Nagorno-Karabakh terrain is over 950 metres (3,120 ft) above sea level. The borders of Nagorno-Karabakh resemble a kidney bean with the indentation on the east side. It has tall mountain ridges along the northern edge and along the west and mountainous south. The part near the indentation of the kidney bean itself is a relatively flat valley, with the two edges of the bean, the districts of Martakert and Martuni, having flatlands as well. Other flatter valleys exist around the Sarsang reservoir, Hadrut, and the south. The entire region lies, on average, 1,100 metres (3,600 ft) above sea level. Notable peaks include the border mountain Murovdag and the Great Kirs mountain chain in the junction of Shusha and Hadrut districts. The territory of modern Nagorno-Karabakh forms a portion of the historic region of Karabakh, which lies between the rivers Kura and Araxes, and the modern Armenia-Azerbaijan border. Nagorno-Karabakh in its modern borders is part of the larger region of Upper Karabakh.

Nagorno-Karabakh does not directly border Armenia but is connected to the latter through the Lachin corridor, a mountain pass under the control of the Russian peacekeeping forces in Nagorno-Karabakh.

The major cities of the region are Stepanakert, which once served as the capital of the unrecognised Nagorno-Karabakh Republic, and Shusha, which lies partially in ruins. Vineyards, orchards, and mulberry groves for silkworms are developed in the valleys.

== Environment ==
Nagorno-Karabakh's environment vary from steppe on the Kura lowland through dense forests of oak, hornbeam, and beech on the lower mountain slopes to birchwood and alpine meadows higher up. The region possesses numerous mineral springs and deposits of zinc, coal, lead, gold, marble, and limestone.

== Demographics ==
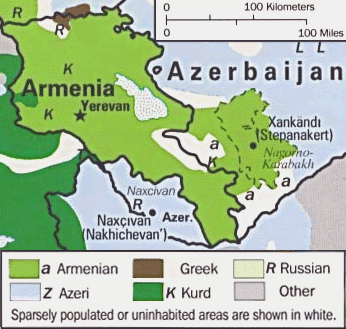
Ethnic groups of the region in 1995, after the deportations of Armenians and Azerbaijanis. (See entire map)

=== Antiquity – 1918 ===
Historically, the inhabitants of Nagorno-Karabakh — then part of the province of Artsakh — were confirmed by Ancient Greek and Roman sources "long before our era" to be Armenian. In the early 15th century, German traveller Johann Schiltberger after visiting the region stated that "although the Muslims had taken possession of Karabagh, there were still Armenian villages in the region". Historian Victor Schnirelmann writes that "In the mid-18th century, … Turkic tribes … gained access to the highland territories [of Karabakh] and began to settle in Shusha … by the end of the 18th century, a substantial number of its former Armenian inhabitants had left Nagorny Karabagh. Just at the turn of the 19th century, the Turkic population significantly outnumbered the local Armenians, but this only lasted … [until the] end of the 1820s, [when] the Armenians began to come back to Karabagh, and they accounted for the majority of its population by the mid-19th century". Edmund Herzig and Marina Kurkchiyan present an alternative view that "Armenians had already been a majority in some areas such as mountainous Karabagh", compared to the Yerevan province which had "regained an Armenian majority for the first time in several hundred years."

According to an 1823 Russian survey published in Tiflis (present-day Tbilisi) in 1866, Armenians made up 97 percent of the population in the five districts (mahals) of Nagorno-Karabakh, thus proving, contrary to claims in Azerbaijani historiography, that Armenians formed an overwhelming majority of Nagorno-Karabakh prior to 1828. Historian George Bournoutian writes that Russian statistics from 1810 show that Armenians made up 21 percent of the Karabakh region's population; In 1823, the Armenian population of Karabakh had increased by 30 percent "after the return of those who had fled the region", and by 1832, the Armenian population had increased to one-third of Karabakh. Moreover, the "one-third" of the population of Karabakh composed of Armenians resided in one-third of the territory of Karabakh, the mountainous territory (i.e. Nagorno-Karabakh), where they "constituted an overwhelming majority of the population."

=== 1918–1920 ===
According to Armenian sources, the "historical Nagorno-Karabakh" region had a population of 300,000–330,000 in 1918–1920, rising to 700,000–800,000 by 1988. As a result of "Turkish-Azerbaijani aggression", the region's population declined by 20 percent in 1918–1920. In this period, Azerbaijani forces carried out massacres against Armenians in Ghaibalishen, Jamilli, Karkijahan, and Pahlul (600–700 dead), Stepanakert (several hundred dead), and Shusha (several hundred to 12,000 dead). As a result of the Shusha massacre, 5,000–6,000 Armenians were displaced to the regions of Varanda and Dizak. By 11 April 1920, some thirty villages in Nagorno-Karabakh had been "devastated" by Azerbaijani forces as a result of the uprising, leaving 25,000 homeless (including nearly 6,000 refugees from Shusha).

=== 1921–1987 ===
1923 statistics indicate that the NKAO was 94.8 percent Armenian, numbering 149,600, whilst the Azerbaijani population numbered 7,700. Historian Cory Welt writes of a "discrepancy" of the Armenian population jumping by over 25,000 individuals between the 1921 and 1923 censuses, also pointing out that the Armenian population declined to 111,700 in 1926, thus indicating an "unexplained drop" of 38,000 individuals. In the 1920s, the NKAO had a population of 131,500 people, 94.4 percent (124,136) of whom were ethnic Armenians and only 5.6 percent (7,364) of whom were ethnic Azerbaijanis. In 1933, Nagorno-Karabakh had a population of 147,308, 10,751 (7.3 percent) of whom were urban dwellers, and 136,557 (92.7 percent) of whom were rural residents. On 1 January 1973, the oblast had a population of 153,000.

==== Discrimination and stagnation ====
Whilst the region was a part of the Azerbaijan SSR, the Armenian share of the population dropped from 94.7 to 76.9 percent, whilst the Azerbaijani share of the population quadrupled from 5.1 to 21.5 percent as a result of "migratory influx" — indicative of the socio-economic difficulties local Armenians experienced under Soviet Azerbaijani leadership which led them to emigrate from Karabakh. Emeritus professor of law M. Cherif Bassiouni writes of the stagnation of the Armenian population "due to the discriminatory policies of Azerbaijani authorities that compelled Armenians to emigrate"; also adding that 600,000 Armenians from Karabakh reside in Armenia and the countries of the CIS. According to historian Deon Geldenhuys, "[t]his was due to Baku's deliberate promotion of Azerbaijani settlement in Karabagh as part of a policy of 'cultural de-Armenization' of the region"; further adding that Azerbaijan "neglected the economic needs of the territory". Stuart J. Kaufman, a professor of political science and international relations, writes of the difficulties of Karabakh Armenians:

… Armenian-language education was not easily available, Armenian history was not taught at all, and those who went to Armenia for training were discriminated against in competing for jobs in the province, … Underinvestment in the region—also blamed on Baku—meant less economic development and poor infrastructure even by Soviet standards, and therefore fewer jobs overall, especially for Armenians. Cultural ties with Armenia were strangled in red tape in Baku, and a decision to make Armenian-language television available in the region was left unimplemented. One result of these policies was a continuing exodus of Armenians from Karabagh in search of greener pastures.

=== 1988–present ===
Following the Sumgait pogrom and the exodus of Azerbaijanis from Armenia, Azerbaijanis in Stepanakert and Armenians in Shusha were expelled in September 1988. As local Armenian forces gained possession of Nagorno-Karabakh and surrounding districts (amounting to 14 percent of the internationally recognised territory of Azerbaijan) during the First Nagorno-Karabakh war, hundreds of thousands of Azerbaijanis were expelled from their lands. During the Second Nagorno-Karabakh War, Azerbaijan regained control over the surrounding districts and southern parts of the former NKAO, thus displacing approximately 70,000 Armenians. In September 2023, Azerbaijan launched an offensive and retook control of Nagorno-Karabakh, ultimately causing the expulsion of ethnic Armenians from the region, who composed 99% of the remaining population.

Historical ethnic composition of the Nagorno-Karabakh Autonomous Oblast in 1921–1989
Ethnic group	1921		1923		1925		1926		1939		1959		1970		1979		1989	
Ethnic group	Number	%	Number	%	Number	%	Number	%	Number	%	Number	%	Number	%	Number	%	Number	%
Armenians	122,426	94.73	149,600	94.8	142,470	90.28	111,694	89.24	132,800	88.04	110,053	84.39	121,068	80.54	123,076	75.89	145,450	76.92
Azerbaijanis (Note: Until 1936, Azerbaijanis were known as "Tatars" or "Turkish-Tatars".)	6,550	5.07	7,700	4.9	15,261	9.67	12,592	10.06	14,053	9.32	17,995	13.80	27,179	18.08	37,264	22.98	40,688	21.52
Russians	267	0.21	500	0.3	46	0.03	596	0.48	3,174	2.10	1,790	1.37	1,310	0.87	1,265	0.78	1,922	1.02
Ukrainians	267	0.21	500	0.3	30	0.02	35	0.03	436	0.29	238	0.18	193	0.13	140	0.09	416	0.22
Belarusians	267	0.21	500	0.3	30	0.02	12	0.01	11	0.01	32	0.02	35	0.02	37	0.02	79	0.04
Greeks	267	0.21	500	0.3	30	0.02	68	0.05	74	0.05	67	0.05	33	0.02	56	0.03	72	0.04
Tatars	267	0.21	500	0.3	30	0.02	6	0.00	29	0.02	36	0.03	25	0.02	41	0.03	64	0.03
Georgians	267	0.21	500	0.3	30	0.02	5	0.00	25	0.02	16	0.01	22	0.01	17	0.01	57	0.03
Others	267	0.21	500	0.3	30	0.02	151	0.12	235	0.16	179	0.14	448	0.30	285	0.18	337	0.18
Total	129,243 (Note: With the city of Shusha included, the NKAO's total population was 138,466, the adjusted ethnic composition is as follows: Armenians – 122,715 (88.62%); Azerbaijanis – 15,444 (11.15%); Others – 307 (0.22%))	100.00	157,800	100.0	157,807	100.00	125,159	100.00	150,837	100.00	130,406	100.00	150,313	100.00	162,181	100.00	189,085	100.00

== Transport ==
=== Air ===
Location	ICAO	DAFIF	IATA	Airport name	Coordinates
Stepanakert	UBBS	UB13		Stepanakert Airport	39°54′05″N 46°47′13″E

In the post-Soviet era, Stepanakert Airport, the region's only airport, has not seen scheduled flights.

=== Rail ===
During the rule of the Soviet Union, the Yevlakh–Aghdam–Stepanakert railway line connected the Nagorno-Karabakh Autonomous Region with the main part of Azerbaijan. In 1993, After the Nagorno-Karabakh war and the abandonment of Aghdam, the line's service was cut back to service only between Yevlax and Kətəlparaq, without any section in Nagorno-Karabakh. Services were restored in August 2025. The former line between Kətəlparaq and Stepanakert has been almost completely destroyed.

In land controlled by the former Republic of Artsakh, the (Tbilisi–Gyumri–)Yerevan–Nakhchivan–Horadiz–Shirvan(–Baku) main railway was also dismantled between Ordubad and Horadiz, as well as a branch-line from Mincivan to the Armenian city of Kapan. Currently, the Azerbaijani trains only travel to Horadiz. The railway at the Nakhchivan Autonomous Republic still operates, but it is separated from the main Azerbaijani lines, and only has a connection to Iran. Construction of a new Horadiz-Agbend line began in 2023, with the first section completed in September 2025.

== See also ==
- Timeline of Artsakh history
- Community for Democracy and Rights of Nations
- List of active separatist movements in Europe
- Janapar – the hiking trail across Nagorno-Karabakh
- Outline of Nagorno-Karabakh
- Post-Soviet states
- Yekbûn

== Bibliography ==
- Ali; Ekinciel (1 August 2015). Karabakh Diary (1 ed.). Russia: Sage. ISBN 978-605-9932-19-6. Archived from the original on 2 March 2021.
