= Berlin Rules on Water Resources =

Summary of international freshwater law

The Berlin Rules on Water Resources is a document adopted by the International Law Association (ILA) to summarize international law customarily applied in modern times to freshwater resources, whether within a nation or crossing international boundaries. Adopted on August 21, 2004, in Berlin, the document supersedes the ILA's earlier "The Helsinki Rules on the Uses of the Waters of International Rivers", which was limited in its scope to international drainage basins and aquifers connected to them.

== Background ==
In 1966, the ILA adopted "The Helsinki Rules on the Uses of the Waters of International Rivers", an unenforceable guideline governing the usage of rivers and connected groundwaters that crossed national boundaries. As the guideline did not address other aquifers, various other guidelines were subsequently drafted and adopted by other organizations to replace or supplement them, including the United Nations' "Convention on the Law of Non-Navigational Uses of International Watercourses" and the ILA's own "Rules on International Groundwaters." However, these documents were restricted to addressing international waters. In 1996, the ILA appointed Joseph Dellapenna to produce a compilation of water related laws, following the production of which in 1997 it decided to create a comprehensive document, addressing all freshwater resources as well as issues affecting the climate that impacts them.

== Provisions ==
The document requires that nations take appropriate steps to sustain and manage water resources, in conjunction with other resources, and minimize environmental harm. In addition to setting out various regulations for nations to follow with respect to water within their boundaries and water they may share, it regulates behavior in wartime, including damage to water installations such as dams and dikes. Nations are not permitted to take action that may result in a shortage of life-sustaining water for civilians, unless a nation being invaded is compelled by military emergency to disable its own water supply, or that may cause undue ecological damage. Poisoning water necessary for survival is in all cases forbidden.

Where water resources are internationally shared, it regulates equitable use with reasonable consideration of such factors as past customary usages of the resource and balancing variant needs and demands of all bordering nations. It mandates that the first consideration in weighing needs is satisfying the requirements of human beings for water to sustain life. It requires that nations sharing water make reasonable efforts not to cause harm to one another by the ways in which the water is used. It permits free navigation by all nations sharing a water system, although it allows reasonable restriction by a nation of water navigation within its jurisdiction for security. Nations are expected to work together as needed to sustain shared water resources.

The document requires a reasonable openness to the international community of information related to water resources and their usage, particularly in those cases where nations sharing a water resource may be impacted. Except in cases of emergency, usage that may significantly impact others should be discussed in advance with all interested nations, with disagreements resolved by appeal as necessary to international governing committees.

Regardless of the location of water, and whether or not a water resource is shared, it asserts the right of every individual to equally access water to sustain life without discrimination, even in times of war. It requires states to enable their citizens to participate in decisions affecting water access by providing reasonable information about the water resource and plans impacting it. It also mandates the compensation of those who are displaced in the interests of securing water preservation. It requires that nations be mindful of the environmental factors that affect water resources and preserve them appropriately, such as by preventing water pollution and preserving native ecosystems, even if they are occupying foreign territory during a time of war. It requires appropriate measures to address flooding and drought, both in communicating quickly about these to nations sharing a water resource and in working to eliminate or prevent harm to a water resource and the population dependent on it.

The Berlin Rules on Water Resources provides that nations must enforce its provisions through local legislation and also submit to international review as necessary to ensure that they are compliant.
