= Drmbon =

Place in Nagorno-Karabakh

Drmbon / Heyvaly Դրմբոն / Heyvalı
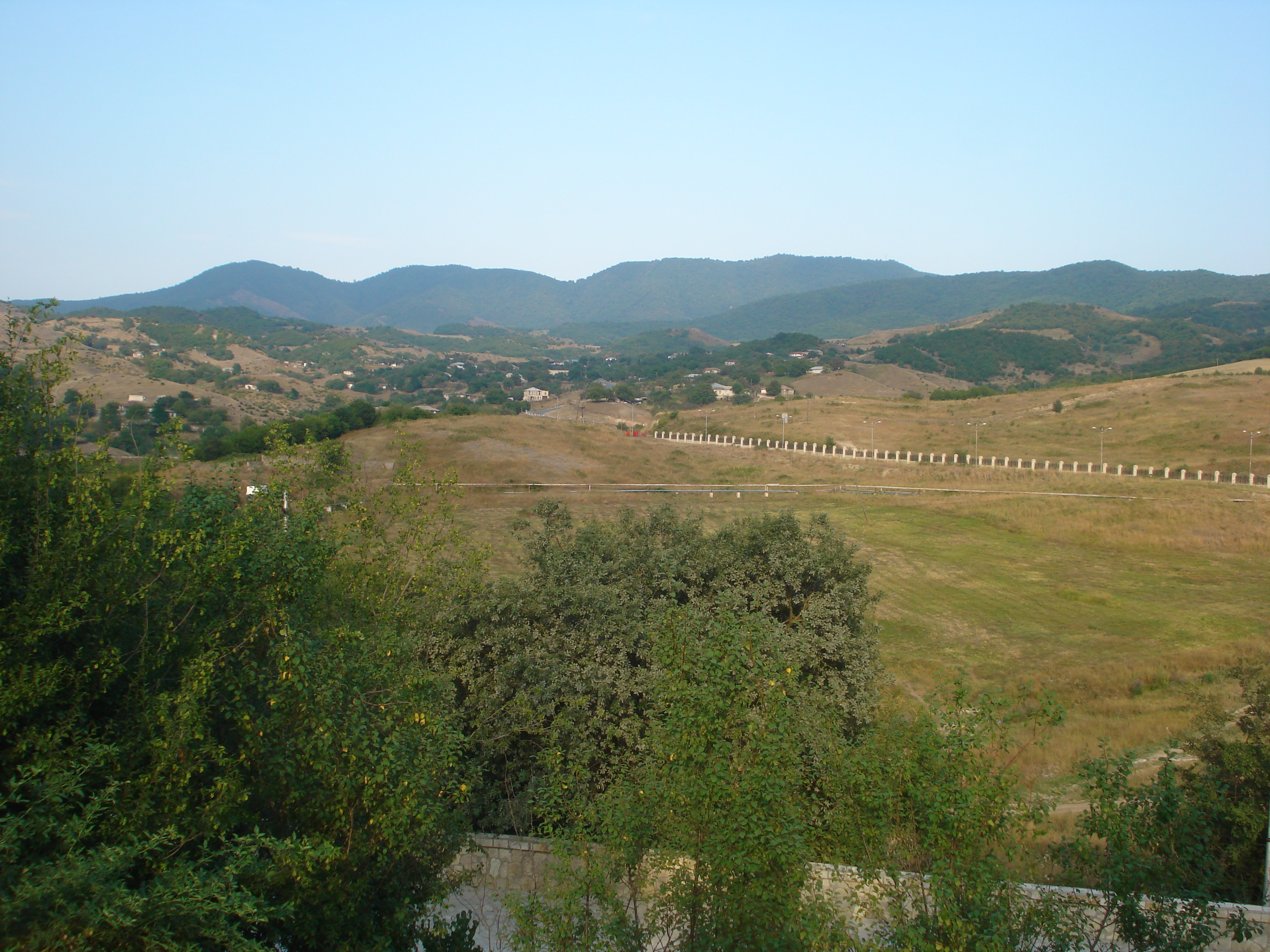

- Location within Azerbaijan Location within East Zangezur Economic Region
- Coordinates: 40°08′57″N 46°36′52″E
- Country: Azerbaijan
  - District: Aghdara

Population (2015)
  - Total: 583
- Time zone: UTC+4 (AZT)

Drmbon (Armenian: Դրմբոն) or Heyvaly (Azerbaijani: Heyvalı) is a village in the Aghdara District of Azerbaijan, in the region of Nagorno-Karabakh. Until 2023 it was controlled by the breakaway Republic of Artsakh. The village had an ethnic Armenian-majority population until the expulsion of the Armenian population of Nagorno-Karabakh by Azerbaijan following the 2023 Azerbaijani offensive in Nagorno-Karabakh.

== History ==
During the Soviet period, the village was part of the Mardakert District of the Nagorno-Karabakh Autonomous Oblast.

== Historical heritage sites ==
Historical heritage sites in and around the village include khachkars from between the 11th and 13th centuries, a 12th/13th-century chapel, and an 18th/19th-century cemetery.

== Economy and culture ==
The population is mainly engaged in mining, agriculture, and animal husbandry. As of 2015, the village has a municipal building, a school, nine shops, and a medical centre.

== Demographics ==
The village had 645 inhabitants in 2005, and 583 inhabitants in 2015.

As of January 2026 the 19 Azerbaijani families, totaling 74 individuals, have been resettled in the Heyvalı village by Azerbaijan.

== Gallery ==
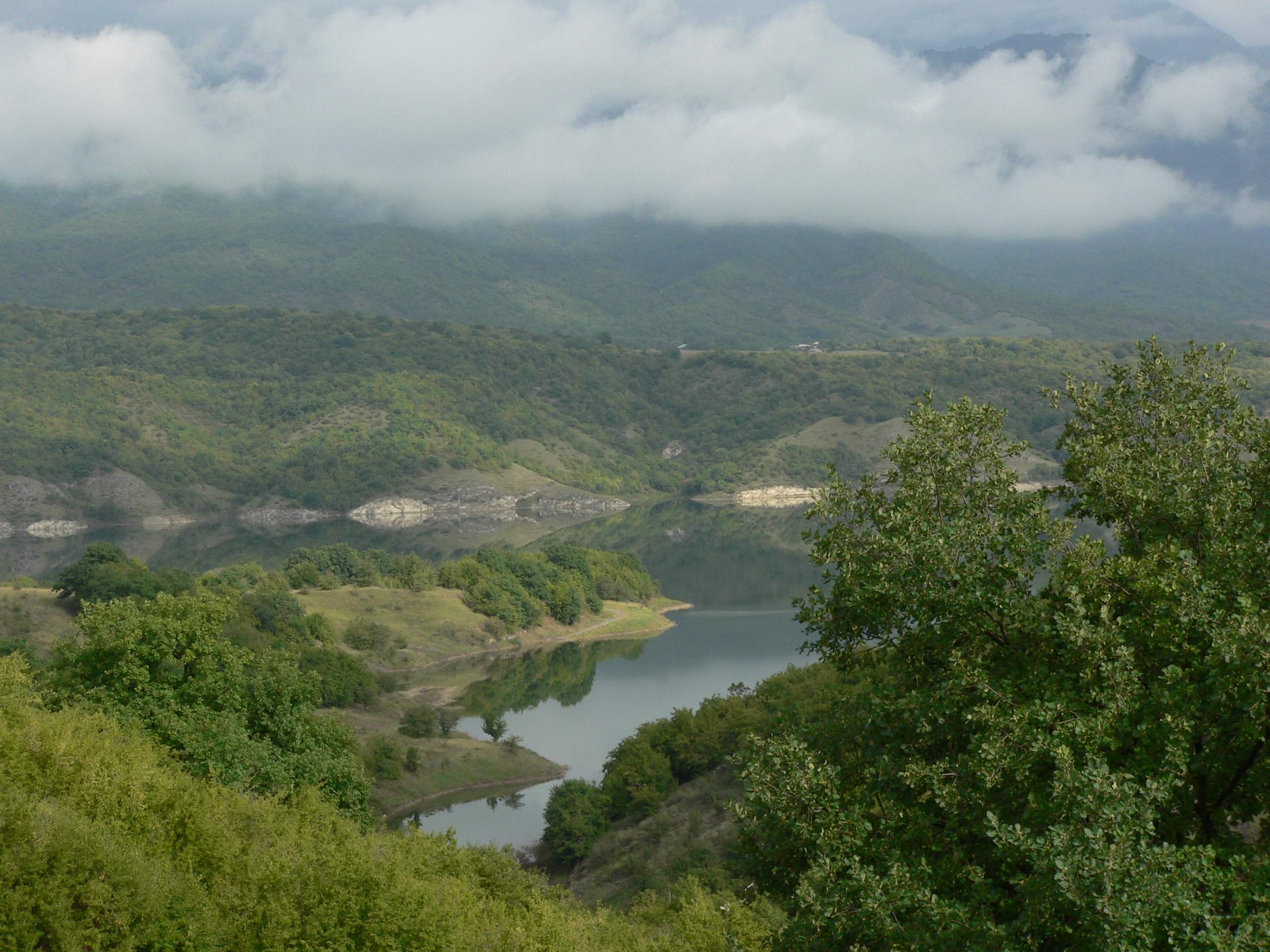
Sarsang reservoir

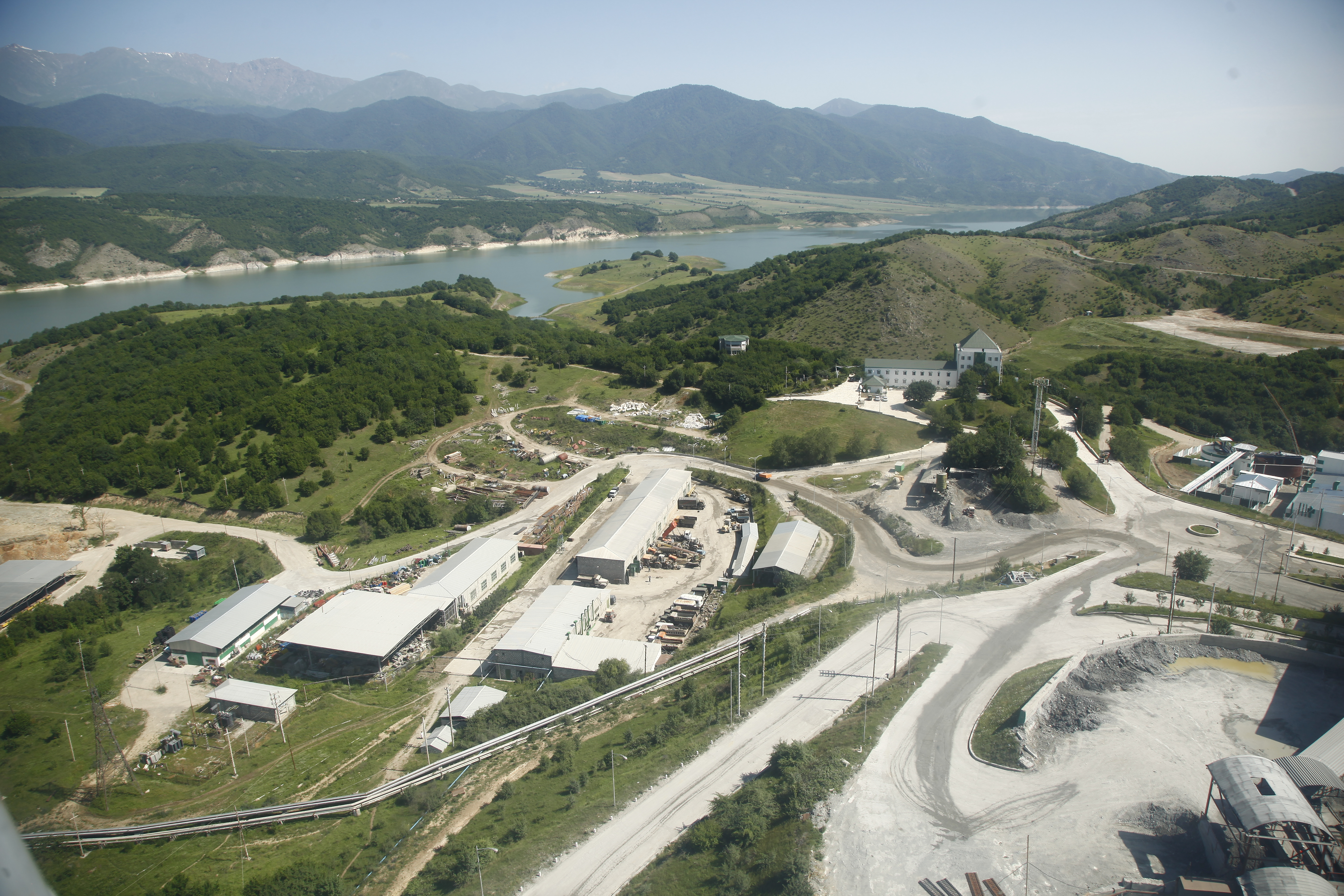
Drmbon mine

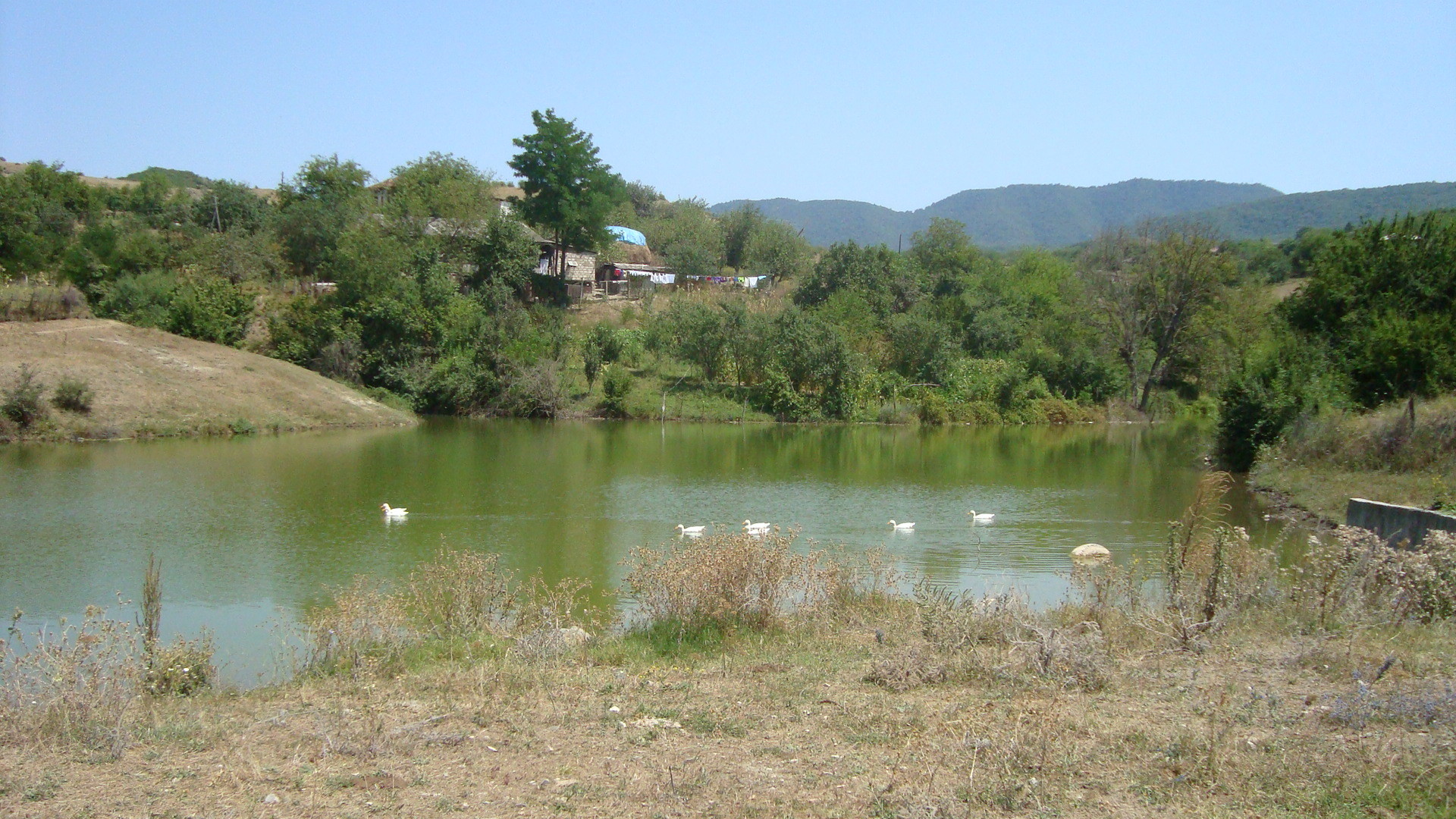
Lake in Drmbon

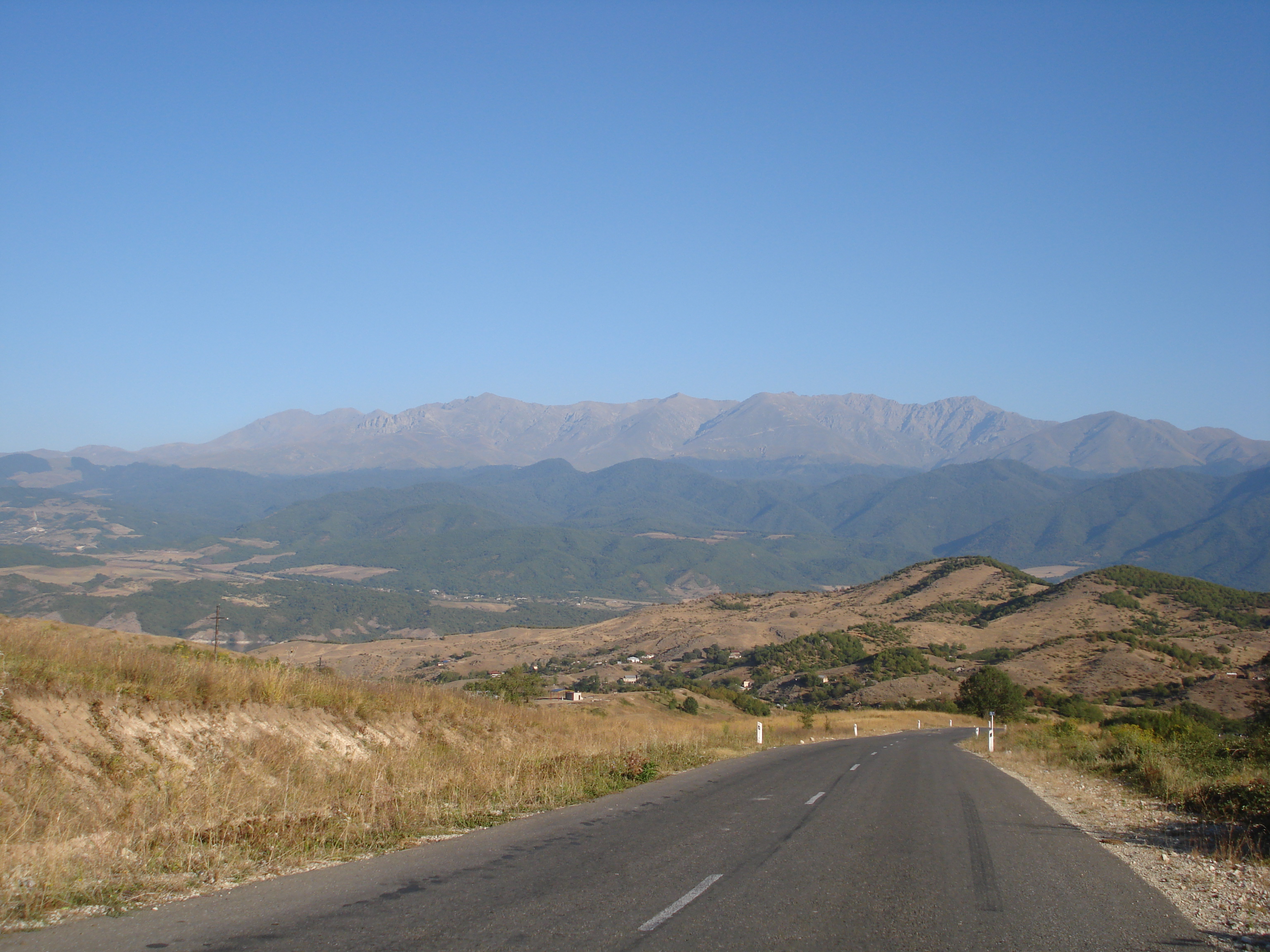
On the road towards the village
