= The Helsinki Rules on the Uses of the Waters of International Rivers =

Guideline for international rivers and water use

The Helsinki Rules on the Uses of the Waters of International Rivers is an international guideline regulating how rivers and their connected groundwaters that cross national boundaries may be used, adopted by the International Law Association (ILA) in Helsinki, Finland in August 1966. In spite of its adoption by the ILA, there is no mechanism in place that enforces the rules. Notwithstanding the guideline's lack of formal status, its work on rules governing international rivers was pioneering. It led to the creation of the United Nations' Convention on the Law of Non-Navigational Uses of International Watercourses. In 2004, it was superseded by the Berlin Rules on Water Resources.

== Provisions ==
Applicable to all drainage basins that cross national boundaries, except where other agreement between bordering nations exists, the Helsinki Rules assert the rights of all bordering nations to an equitable share in the water resources, with reasonable consideration of such factors as past customary usages of the resource and balancing variant needs and demands of the bordering nations. It also mandates protection of the resource by bordering nations with respect to water pollution in Chapter 3 (Articles IX to XI) and sets forth recommendations for resolving disputes over usage of such watercourses.

The Helsinki rules consist of 37 articles spread over 6 chapters.

Chapter 2, Article 4 states: "Each basin State is entitled, within its territory, to a reasonable and equitable share in the beneficial uses of the waters of an international drainage basin".

In determining what is reasonable and equitable share, all relevant factors are to be considered together and a conclusion reached on the basis of the whole. The list provided in Article 5 (2) is produced in full below:

1. The geography of the basin, including in particular the extent of the drainage area in the territory of each basin State

2. The hydrology of the basin, including in particular the contribution of water by each basin State

3. The climate affecting the basin

4. The past utilization of the waters of the basin, including in particular existing utilization

5. The economic and social needs of each basin State

6. The population dependent on the waters of the basin in each basin State

7. The comparative costs of alternative means of satisfying the economic and social needs of each basin State

8. The availability of other resources

9. The avoidance of unnecessary waste in the utilization of waters of the basin

10. The practicability of compensation to one or more of the co-basin States as a means of adjusting conflicts among uses

11. The degree to which the needs of a basin State may be satisfied, without causing substantial injury to a co-basin State

Article 6 precludes inherent preference of any use over others. Article 7 prohibits denial of reasonable use to a basin state on the basis of future uses of other states.

Article 8 relates to "existing reasonable uses".

Section 8 (1) states: "An existing reasonable use may continue in operation unless the factors justifying its continuance are outweighed by other factors leading to the conclusion that it be modified or terminated so as to accommodate a competing incompatible use".

Section 8 (2) defines the entry & exit criterion of an existing use.

Section 8 (3) prohibits a use that is incompatible with an already existing reasonable use at the time of becoming operational from being treated as an existing use.

== Limitations ==
Although "an important set of draft rules," according to Stephen McCaffrey of the McGeorge School of Law, the Helsinki Rules do not address independent aquifers, but only those connected to a river. Accordingly, the United Nations decided in 1970 to create a more inclusive set of guidelines, which after more than twenty years of investigation by the International Law Commission resulted in the adopting of the Convention on the Law of Non-Navigational Uses of International Watercourses in 1997. The ILA itself addressed this limitation in adopting the Rules on International Groundwaters, also known as the Seoul Rules, in Seoul, Korea in 1986 and the Berlin Rules on Water Resources in 2004, which superseded this guideline.

== See also ==
- Water right
- Water law
- UN Rules
- Interstate River Water Disputes Act, India
