= Sarsang Reservoir =

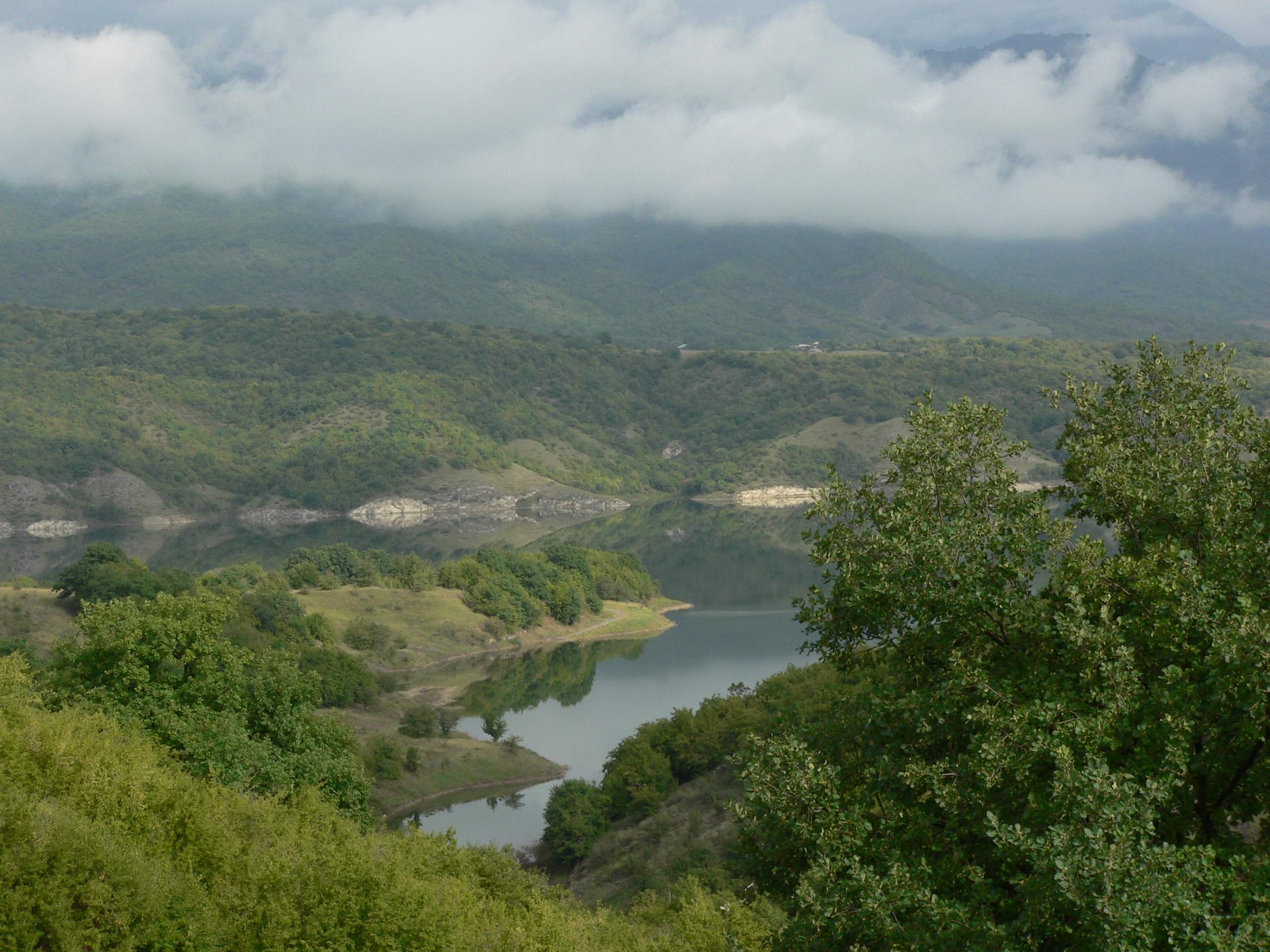

- Location within Azerbaijan
- Location: Tartar & Kalbajar, Azerbaijan
- Coordinates: 40°10′53.05″N 46°37′1.44″E
- Type: reservoir
- Primary inflows: Tartar river
- Primary outflows: Tartar river
- Built: 1976
- Surface area: 14.2 km^{2} (5.5 sq mi)
- Water volume: 560 million cubic metres (450,000 acre⋅ft)

The Sarsang Reservoir (Azerbaijani: Sərsəng su anbarı, Armenian: Սարսանգի ջրամբար, romanized: Sarsangi jrambar) is a reservoir located in the Tartar and Kalbajar districts of Azerbaijan. The reservoir was formed by the construction of a dam on the Tartar River. The overall volume of the reservoir is 575 million m^{3}.

== Overview ==
Sarsang Reservoir was built on the Tartar River by the Soviet authorities in 1976. At that time, the district was part of Mardakert District (NKAO). The area of the reservoir is 14.2 km^{2} (5.5 sq mi). The height of the dam at the reservoir is 125 m (410 ft). The reservoir has the tallest dam out of all dams in Azerbaijan. When it opened, the reservoir provided irrigation water for 100,000 ha (250,000 acres) in the districts of Tartar, Agdam, Barda, Goranboy, Yevlakh and Aghjabadi. The Sarsang Hydro Power Plant has a generation capacity of 50 megawatts.

In November 1992, in the midst of the First Nagorno-Karabakh War, the region of Mardakert came under effective Armenian control. The power plant, then operated by Artsakh HEK OJSC, was the source of 40-60% of Artsakh's electricity consumption. Local authorities expressed hopes for the reservoir to be made a major tourism site.

== Environmental concerns ==
Azerbaijan maintained that the Sarsang Reservoir, due to poor maintenance, poses a threat to nearly 400,000 people living in the Karabakh lowlands which remained under Azerbaijani control. The country has taken measures to minimise potential damage that water evacuation could cause. In addition, the exploitation of the reservoir by the Armenian side deprived farmers in seven Azerbaijani villages in the Tartar District from accessing water regularly.

In 2014, Bosnian member of the Parliamentary Assembly of the Council of Europe (PACE) Milica Marković prepared a report, outlining environmental risks brought upon by the lack of regular maintenance of the dam, as well as a possibility of the frontier regions of Azerbaijan being deprived of water supply as a result of intensive farming, industrial activities, climate change and consumer habits, but also policy mistakes on the part of the Nagorno-Karabakh authorities. On 26 January 2016, PACE (of which both Armenia and Azerbaijan are members) adopted Resolution 2085, whereby it deplored "the fact that the occupation by Armenia of Nagorno-Karabakh and other adjacent areas of Azerbaijan creates similar humanitarian and environmental problems for the citizens of Azerbaijan living in the Lower Karabakh valley" and requested the immediate withdrawal of Armenian armed forces from the region in order to allow independent engineers access to carry out an on-the-spot survey. The Assembly also recommended that the Armenian side stopped using water resources as tools of political influence or an instrument of pressure, benefiting only one of the parties to the conflict.

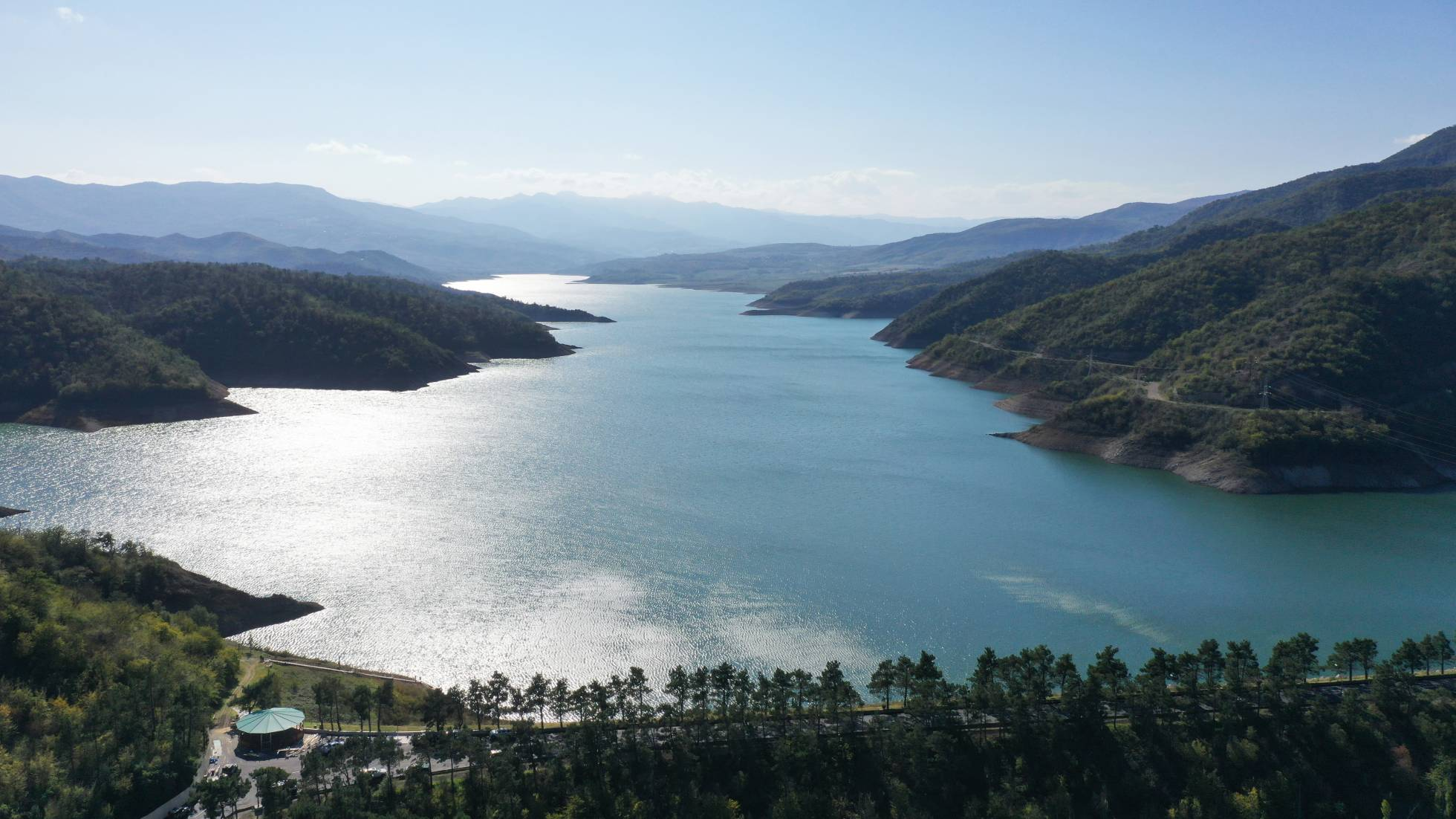
Sarsang reservoir October 2023

In June 2016, the White House formally responded to a petition signed by over 330,000 people regarding the status of Nagorno-Karabakh and the dangers posed by the Sarsang Reservoir. In response, the Obama administration expressed its support of the PACE Resolution 2085 and said it would welcome a meeting between technical experts to discuss water management and dam inspections at the reservoir.
