= Azerbaijan Amelioration and Water Farm Company =

Azerbaijan Amelioration and Water Farm Open Joint Stock Company (Azerbaijani: Azərbaycan Meliorasiya və Su Təsərrüfatı Açıq Səhmdar Cəmiyyəti) is a public company providing public services in the field of water management, carries out the activities related to the development of water supply and distribution.

== History ==
Centralized management of water supplies was first created under the People's Commissariat of the Azerbaijan SSR in 1920. In 1925, the Department was established under the Supreme Economic Council of the Azerbaijan SSR, and it was called "Azvodkhoz".

In 1941, it was renamed to “National Commissariat of Water Industry of Azerbaijan” and in 1966, the Ministry of Amelioration and Water Farm of the Azerbaijan SSR was established.

On October 23, 2004, the centralized water management was established under the Ministry of Agriculture of the Republic of Azerbaijan.

According to a decree of the President, the public entity named “Azerbaijan Amelioration and Water Farm” was created on February 23, 2006. According to the decree, the water supply of Azerbaijan is managed by this entity in cooperation with other government structures.

== Objectives ==
The main task of Azerbaijan Amelioration and Water Farm is to effectively manage and distribute water supplies to various sectors between sectors, monitor efficient use, take the measures against flood or in case of some problems, provide the technical development in the water management area.

== Structure ==
Azerbaijan Amelioration and Water Company consists of following departments: The Department of Irrigation Systems' Operation; Department of Melioration, Water Resources and Water Consumer Associations; Department of Mechanization, Industrialization and "Melioservice"; Department of Science, Design, Construction and External Relations; Department of Economics, Finance and Internal Audit; Department of work and economic affairs with documents, applications of citizens; Information, management system development sector; Human Resources department; Supply Sector department; Water Reservoir and Hydraulic Maintenance Sector department.
