= Convention on the Law of the Non-Navigational Uses of International Watercourses =

UN treaty on the use of transboundary rivers and groundwater

The Convention on the Law of Non-Navigational Uses of International Watercourses, commonly referred to as the UN Watercourses Convention, is an international treaty, adopted by the United Nations on 21 May 1997, pertaining to the uses and conservation of all waters that cross international boundaries, including both surface and groundwater. "Mindful of increasing demands for water and the impact of human behavior", the UN drafted the document to help conserve and manage water resources for present and future generations. From the time of its drafting, the Convention took more than 17 years to enter into force on 17 August 2014. With the treaty having been ratified by just 36 states, the majority of countries, especially the key ones, remain outside its scope. The convention, however, is regarded as an important step in establishing international law governing water.

In northern hemisphere autumn of 2008, the UN began reviewing a law proposed by the International Law Commission to serve similar purpose to the unratified document, but was considering adopting the proposal as guideline rather than immediately attempting to draft it into law.

== Background ==
The International Law Commission (ILC) was requested by the United Nations in 1970 to prepare viable international guidelines for water use comparable to The Helsinki Rules on the Uses of the Waters of International Rivers, which had been approved by the International Law Association in 1966 but which failed to address aquifers that were not connected to a drainage basin. After the ILC completed its project in 1994, the UN Sixth Committee drafted the Convention on the Law of Non-Navigational Uses of International Watercourses based on their proposal. The General Assembly adopted the document on 21 May 1997 with only three dissenting in a vote of 106.

== Provisions ==
The document sought to impose upon UN member states an obligation to consider the impact of their actions on other states with an interest in a water resource and to equitably share the resource, mindful of variant factors such as population size and availability of other resources.

Each member state that shares in a resource is required to provide information to other sharing states about the condition of the watercourse and about their planned uses for it, allowing sufficient time for other sharing states to study the use and object if the use is perceived to be harmful. The document permits a state with urgent need to immediately utilize a watercourse, providing that it notifies sharing states both of the use and the urgency. In the event that a use is perceived to be harmful, it requires member states to negotiate a mutually acceptable solution, appealing for arbitration as necessary to uninvolved states or international organizations such as the International Court of Justice.

The treaty also requires states to take reasonable steps to control damage, such as caused by pollution or the introduction of species not native to the watercourse, and imposes an obligation on states that damage a shared water resource to take steps to remedy the damage or to compensate sharing states for the loss. It includes provisions for managing natural damage to waterways, such as caused by drought or erosion, and mandated that sharing states notify others immediately of emergency conditions related to the watercourse that may affect them, such as flooding or waterborne diseases.

== Article 7 controversy ==
Article 7 of the document, entitled, "Obligation not to cause significant harm," requires that member states "in utilizing an international watercourse in their territories ... take all appropriate measures to prevent the causing of significant harm to other watercourse states" and compensate sharing states for any such harm. According to Stephen McCaffrey of the McGeorge School of Law, this is "the most controversial provision" of the Convention, with conflict stemming from the fact that a state may have legitimate uses for a watercourse in its nation that can negatively impact other nations. He offers the following example:

Suppose ... upstream State A has not significantly developed its water resources because of its mountainous terrain. The topography of the downstream states on the watercourse, B and C, is flatter, and they have used the watercourse extensively for irrigation for centuries, if not millennia. State A now wishes to develop its water resources for hydroelectric and agricultural purposes. States B and C cry foul, on the ground that this would significantly harm their established uses.

McCaffrey indicates that controversy here stemmed from the UN's adaptation of text by the ILC with the intention of strengthening the obligation to do no harm, as the ILC's language more heavily emphasized the "equitable utilization", or balance of the various needs of the states.
