= Sarsang Hydro Power Plant =

Hydroelectric power station in Tartar, Azerbaijan

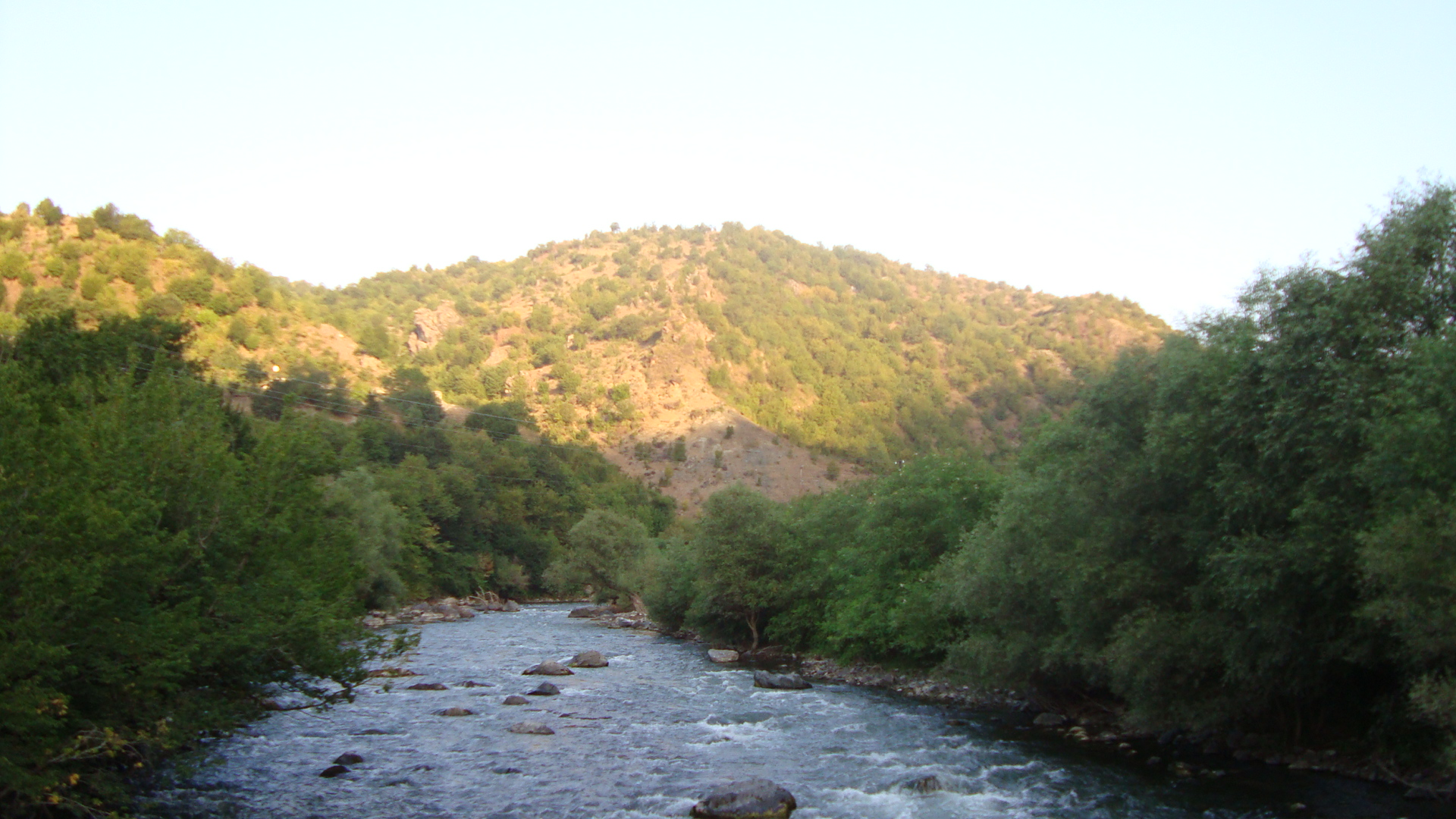
- Country: Azerbaijan
- Location: Tartar
- Coordinates: 40.2076°N 46.6507°E
- Status: Operational

Thermal power station
- Primary fuel: Hydropower

Power generation
- Nameplate capacity: 50 MW (67,000 hp)

The Sarsang Hydro Power Plant is a hydroelectricity plant located in Tartar District of Azerbaijan. The power plant has an installed electric capacity of 50 megawatts (67,000 hp) on Sarsang reservoir, and previously provided 40-60% of the electricity consumed in the Republic of Artsakh before 2023. In 1990, the station generated 81.9 million kWh.

== See also ==
- List of power stations in Azerbaijan
