= Joseph Dellapenna =

American legal scholar

Joseph William Dellapenna (born December 28, 1942) was a Professor of Law at Villanova University School of Law. He was born in Detroit.

== Academic Background ==
Professor Dellapenna holds a B.B.A. earned at the University of Michigan in 1965, a J.D. cum laude from the Detroit College of Law earned in 1968, an LL.M. in Public International & Comparative Law from George Washington University completed in 1969 and an LL.M. in environmental law from Columbia University completed in 1974. Dellapenna has been admitted to practice as an attorney in Michigan and also for cases before the United States Supreme Court.

== Abortion ==
Professor Dellapenna's book Dispelling the Myths of Abortion History (Carolina Academic Press, 2006) was cited extensively in Justice Samuel Alito's majority opinion in Dobbs v. Jackson Women's Health Organization, which overruled Roe v. Wade. A revised edition was issued in 2023, in which Dellapenna acknowledged his role in overturning Roe.

== Water Law ==
He represented the Connecticut Water Works Association in City of Waterbury v. Town of Washington, 260 Conn. 506, 802 A.2d 1102 (2002).

Dellapenna has been Director of the Model Water Code Project of the American Society of Civil Engineers since 1996 and served as Rapporteur of the Water Resources Committee of the International Law Association from 1996 to 2004.

== International and Comparative Law ==
Dellapenna was co-counsel for the family of Raoul Wallenberg in a case brought by Wallenberg's half-brother, Guy von Dardel. Von Dardel v. U.S.S.R., 623 F. Supp. 246 (D.D.C. 1985). Although the judgment subsequently was vacated, 736 F. Supp. 1 (D.D.C. 1990), the Soviet government then opened its records to the family regarding Wallenberg's fate, resulting in a report jointly released by the Swedish and Russian governments in 2000 confirming Wallenberg's murder in 1947.

== Honors ==
Dellapenna was awarded the Raoul Wallenberg Medal by the Raoul Wallenberg Foundation for his work on litigation seeking to determine what became of Wallenberg.
