= Stephen McCaffrey =

American legal academic (born 1945)

Stephen Conolley McCaffrey (born 1945) is an American legal academic.

McCaffrey earned his bachelor's degree from the University of Colorado Boulder in 1967, followed by a Juris Doctor at the University of California, Berkeley in 1971, and a Dr. Jur. from the University of Cologne in 1974. He was a professor at the Southwestern University School of Law between 1974 and 1977, when he joined the McGeorge School of Law at the University of the Pacific. He was appointed Carol Olson Endowed Professor of International Law, and in 2000, became a distinguished professor of law. McCaffrey won the Stockholm Water Prize in 2017, and, the next year, received the Distinguished Elisabeth Haub Award for Environmental Law and Diplomacy from Pace University's Elisabeth Haub School of Law.
