= Velvelechay (river) =

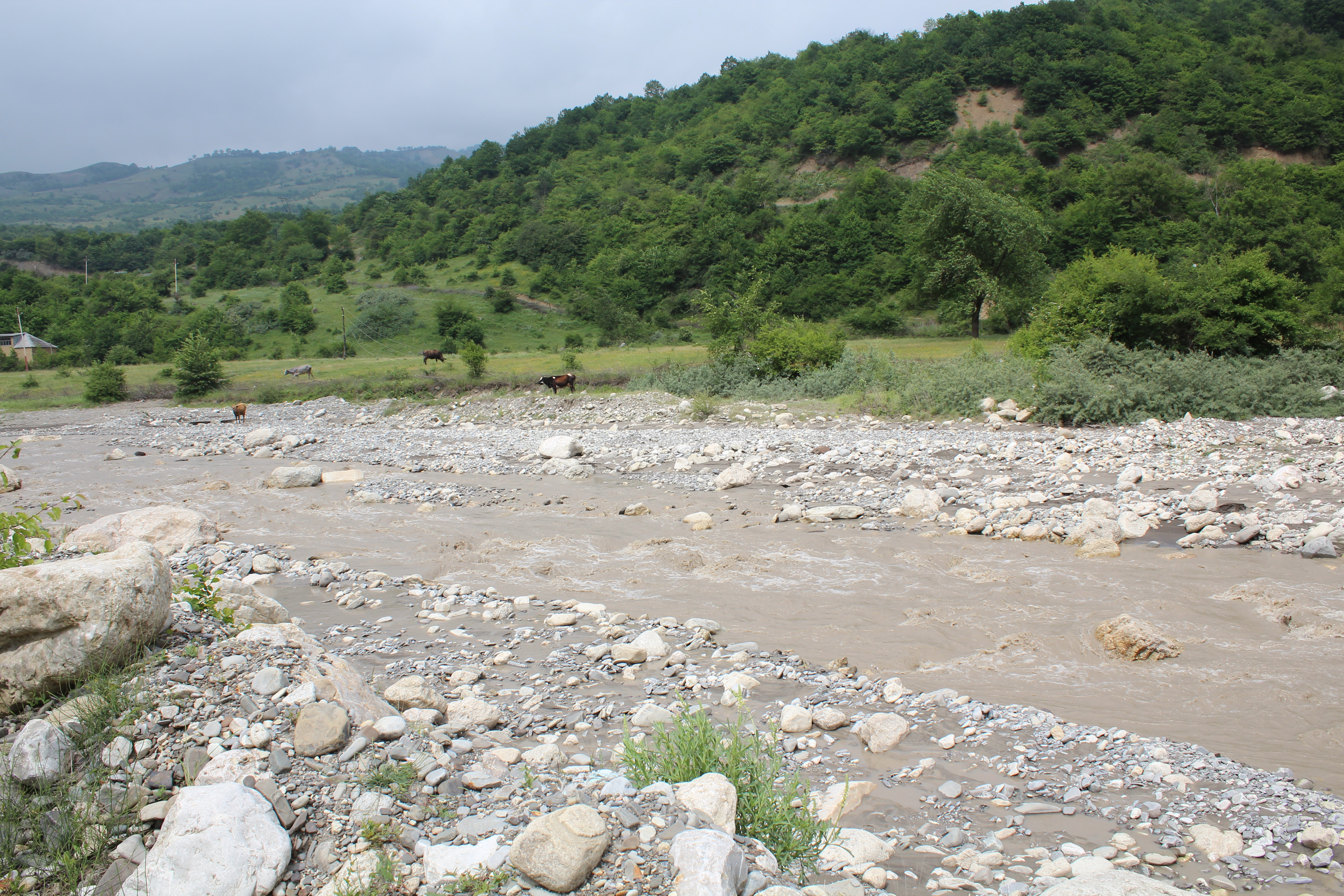
- Native name: Azerbaijani: Vəlvələçay

Physical characteristics
- Mouth: Caspian Sea
  - coordinates: 41°22′56″N 49°03′36″E
- Length: 90 km (56 mi)

Velvelechay (Azerbaijani: Vəlvələçay; from Arabic velvele, 'big noise', 'shout', 'turmoil', and Azerbaijani çay, 'river') is a river in Azerbaijan, flowing through the territories of the Guba and Khachmaz districts. It originates from the Mount Babadagh, at an altitude of about 3500 m above the sea level and flows into the Caspian Sea near the village of Chaygaragashli. The river is full of water with an unstable regime.

Velvelechay flows through such villages as Talysh, Yerfi, Nohurduzu, Afurja, Tengealty, Velvele, Chilegir. Within the upper part of the river basin is the Tengin gorge with its steep rocky shores.

The locals call the river "Babachay", which is presumably related to the location of the source of the river, Mount Babadagh. In the river basin, there are lakes of landslide origin, which include lakes like Atudzh, Yerfi, etc.

In 1933, V. A. Dolitsky noted paleogene deposits near the Velvelechay river. It is a source of replenishment of water reserves in the Takhtakorpu reservoir.

== See also ==
- Gashgachay
