= Çiləgir =

Çiləgir may refer to:

- Çılğır, Azerbaijan
- Çiləgir, Khachmaz, Azerbaijan
- Çiləgir, Qusar, Azerbaijan
