= Knaravan =

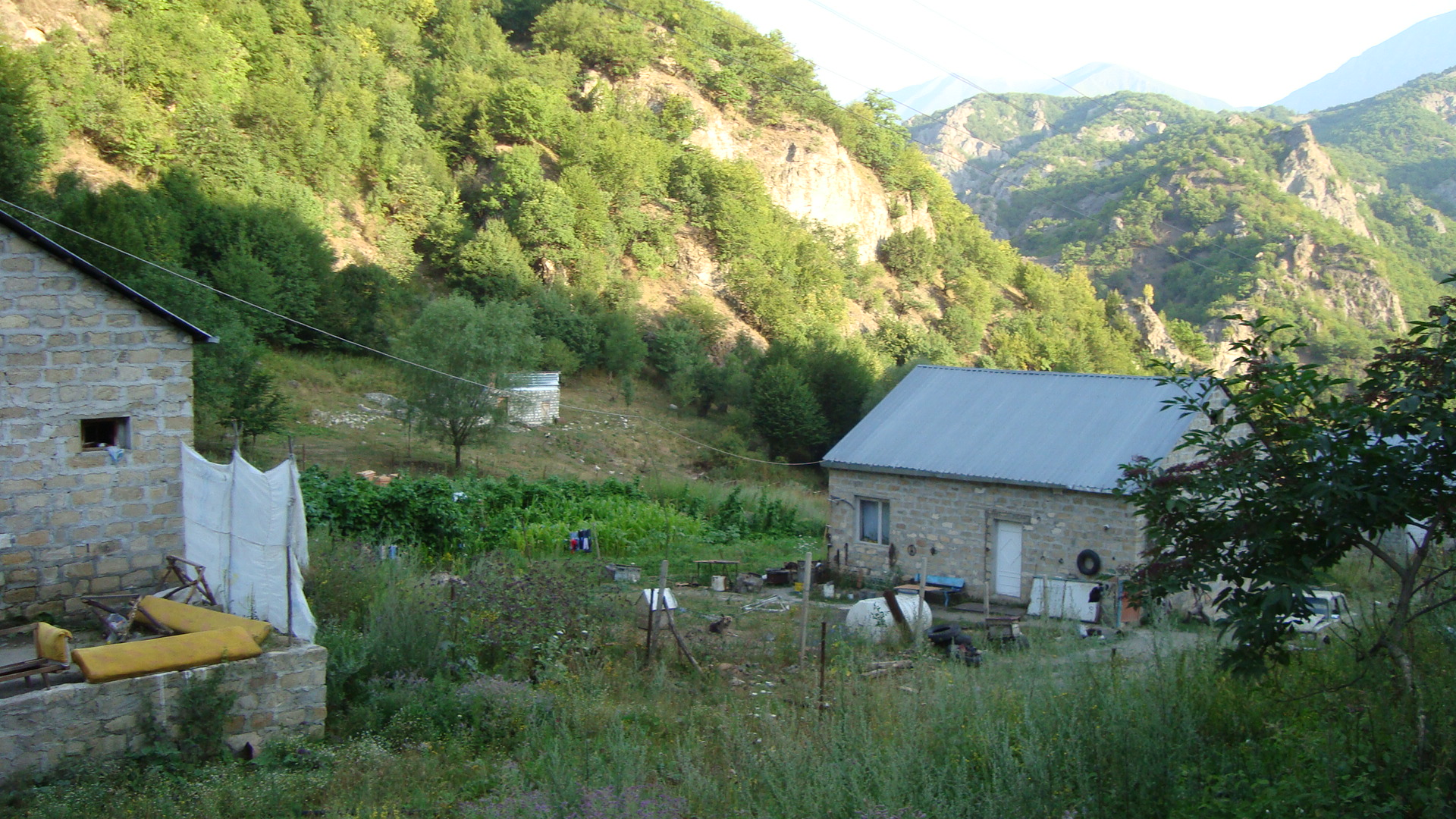
- Knaravan in 2010

- Location within Azerbaijan Location within East Zangezur Economic Region
- Coordinates: 40°13′33″N 46°08′23″E
- Country: Azerbaijan
- Rayon: Kalbajar
- Established: 2004

Population (2015)
  - Total: 76
- Time zone: UTC+4 (AZT, AMT)
  - Summer (DST): UTC+5 (AZT)

Knaravan (Armenian: Քնարավան) is a ghost village in the Kalbajar District of Azerbaijan. From its inception in 2004 until 2020, it was controlled by the Nagorno-Karabakh Republic. It was located in the gorge of the Levçay, a tributary of the Tartar south of the Murovdağ ridge, at the foot of Mount Qorovul.

== History ==
The village was founded in 2004 by the Yerkir charitable foundation with money from Armenian American Karapet Harutyunyan on the territory of Azerbaijan, which came under the control of Armenian troops in 1993 during the First Nagorno-Karabakh War. It was named in honor of Harutyunyan's deceased wife, Knar Harutyunyan. From 2002 to 2010, 3 million US dollars were invested in rural infrastructure. Knaravan consisted of 18 cottage houses and a school. The village was inhabited by immigrants that came from Artashat, Vedi, Gavar and Yerevan.

According to the administrative-territorial division of the unrecognized Republic of Artsakh, which controlled the area from April 1993 to November 2020, it was located in the Shahumyan Province. Nearby Knaravan is the ruined fortress of Handaberd.

In 2020, during the Second Nagorno-Karabakh War, Knaravan was shelled, during which a local resident was wounded. Under the terms of the ceasefire agreement, Armenian troops were withdrawn from the area and the territory on which the village is located returned to Azerbaijani control on 25 November 2020. Residents left the village en masse at the same time, but not before they had destroyed what was impossible to take with them so that the enemy would not get it. In one day telephone poles were knocked down, all houses, a school and abandoned property were burned.

== Demographics ==
The village had 76 inhabitants in 2015.
