= Nokhur (disambiguation) =

Nohur refers to name of a settlement in Turkmenistan.

Nohur may also refer to:

- Nohurlar, Shabran District, Azerbaijan
- Nohurdüzü, Quba District, Azerbaijan
