= Lev, Azerbaijan =

Lev
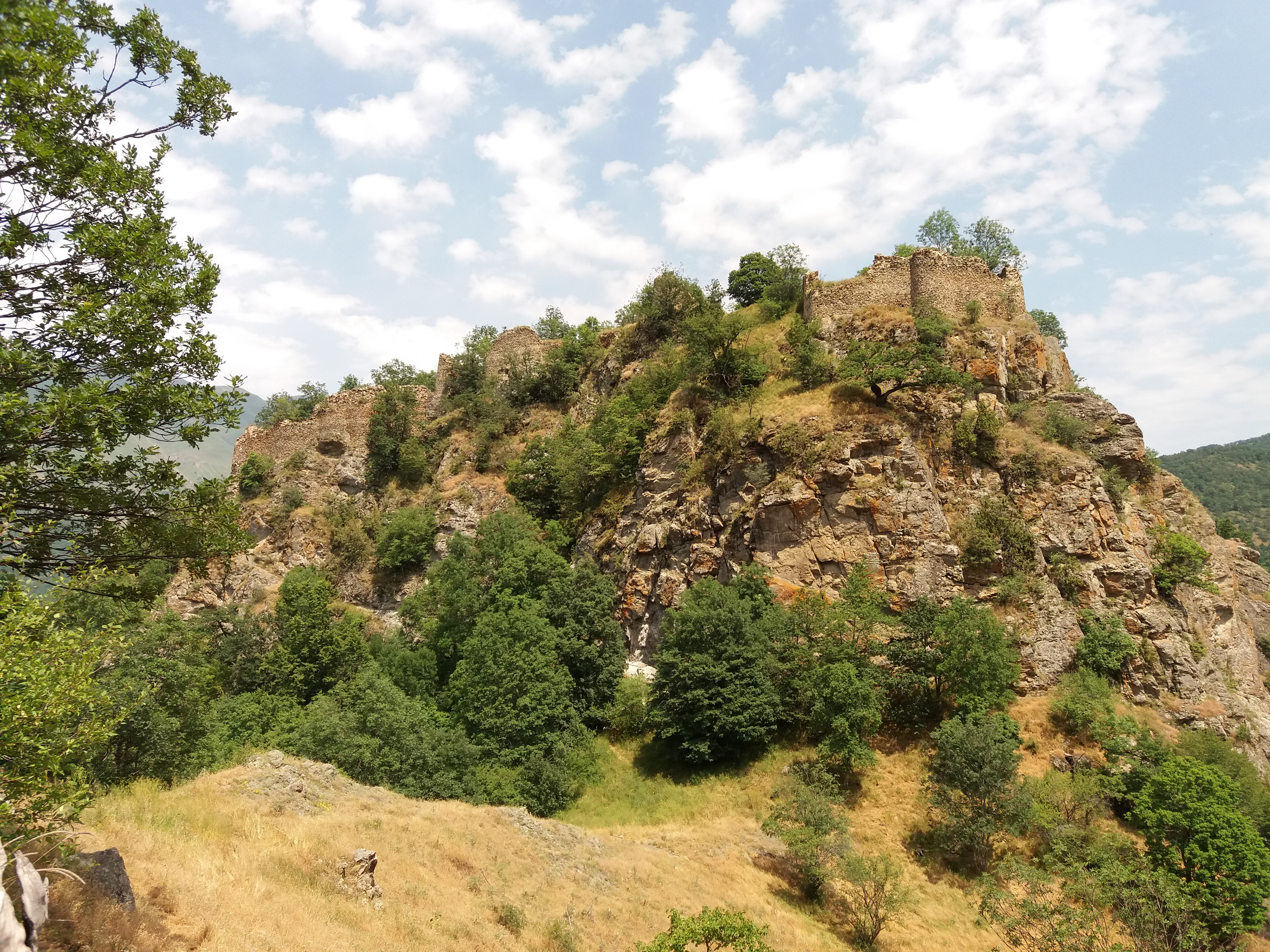
- Handaberd Fortress (Lev castle)

- Location within Azerbaijan Location within East Zangezur Economic Region
- Coordinates: 40°15′37″N 46°06′20″E
- Country: Azerbaijan
- Rayon: Kalbajar
- Time zone: UTC+4 (AZT, AMT)
  - Summer (DST): UTC+5 (AZT)

Lev (Azerbaijani and Kurdish: Lev; Armenian: Լեւոնի Գիւղ, romanized: Lewoni Giwġ, lit. 'Levon's Village') is a village in the Kalbajar District of Azerbaijan. The medieval Armenian Handaberd fortress and monastery are located near the village.

== History ==
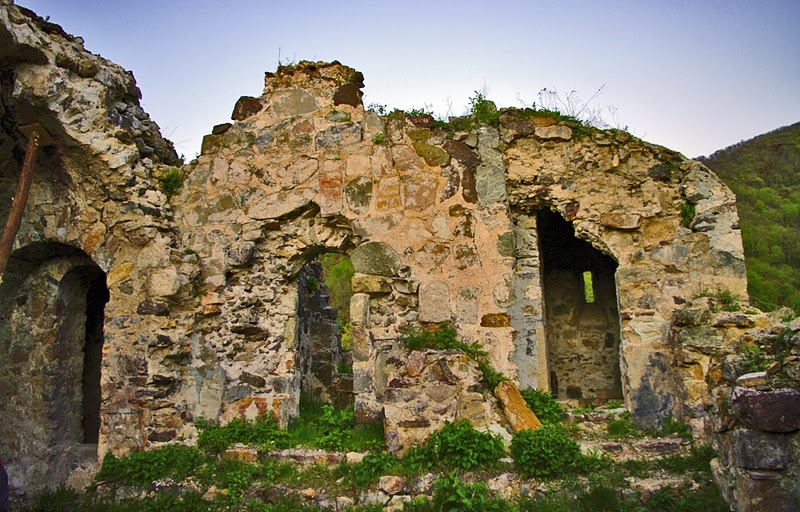
Armenian monastery near Lev

According to medieval Armenian sources, Lev has been an Armenian settlement since the Middle Ages. The historical settlement of Lev was located on the southern slope of the left bank of the Lev river. Lev was mentioned in 1763, in the list of the monastic residences of Dadivank. It served as a monastic residence until 1913. Makar Barkhudaryan, an Apostolic bishop and ethnographer from Shusha, mentions the monastery in Lev during his 19th century travels. The Armenian monastery of the village survived until 1913, when it was destroyed by Soviet authorities.

There is a 9th-century Armenian fortress called Handaberd (Lev castle) located near the village. It was built by Atrnerseh I, ruler of the Armenian Principality of Khachen, who resided there. It served as Atrnerseh's residence as well as a prison for prisoners sentenced to death. According to the inscription on one of the khachkars kept at Dadivank, from 1142 to 1182 Handaberd belonged to Hasan I Vakhtangyan, prince of Upper Khachen. Some time after the initial construction under Atrnerseh, the fortress was significantly expanded. Around 1250, the fortress is mentioned in the history written by the Armenian historian Kirakos Gandzaketsi.
