= Ağdabançay =

Location
- Country: Azerbaijan
- Region: Caucasus
- District: Kalbajar
- City: Kalbajar

Physical characteristics
- Source: Lesser Caucasus
  - location: Near Getavan, Kalbajar District, Azerbaijan
  - elevation: 881 m (2,890 ft)
- Mouth: Tartarchay
  - location: Getavan, Kalbajar, Azerbaijan
  - coordinates: 40°07′52″N 46°27′40″E
- Length: 19 km (12 mi)

Basin features
- Progression: Tartar→ Kura→ Caspian Sea

The Ağdabançay is one of the tributaries of the Tartarchay located in Karabakh region of Republic of Azerbaijan.

== Overview ==
The Ağdabançay, a left tributary of the Tartarchay, is a 19 km (12 mi) long river flowing from an altitude of 881 m (2,890 ft) in central Kalbajar District into the Tartarchay which then proceeds west through Tartar and Barda districts, flowing into Kura River in the latter district.

== See also ==
- Rivers and lakes in Azerbaijan
- Tartarchay
- Levçay
- Turağayçay
- Qarqar River
