= Mount Kichik Kirs =

Mountain in Azerbaijan

Kichik Kirs
- Location within Caucasus Mountains Location within Azerbaijan

Highest point
- Elevation: 2,346 m (7,697 ft)
- Coordinates: 39°40′29″N 46°43′39″E

Naming
- Native name: Kiçik Kirs dağı (Azerbaijani)

Geography
- Country: Azerbaijan

Mount Kichik Kirs (Azerbaijani: Kichik Kirs dağı — Mount Little Kirs) is one of the highest peaks in the Karabakh Range of the Lesser Caucasus in the south-east of the Shusha District of Azerbaijan at an altitude of 1,800 metres or 2,346 metres. The map displayed on the "Virtual Qarabağ" website shows the height of Kichik Kirs as 2346 metres.

== Toponymy ==
It is named so because Mount Kichik Kirs is lower in height than Mount Boyuk Kirs (2,725 m) located in this area.
