= Handaberd =

- Հանդաբերդ; Lekh Castle • Lex qalası
- Kalbajar District, Azerbaijan
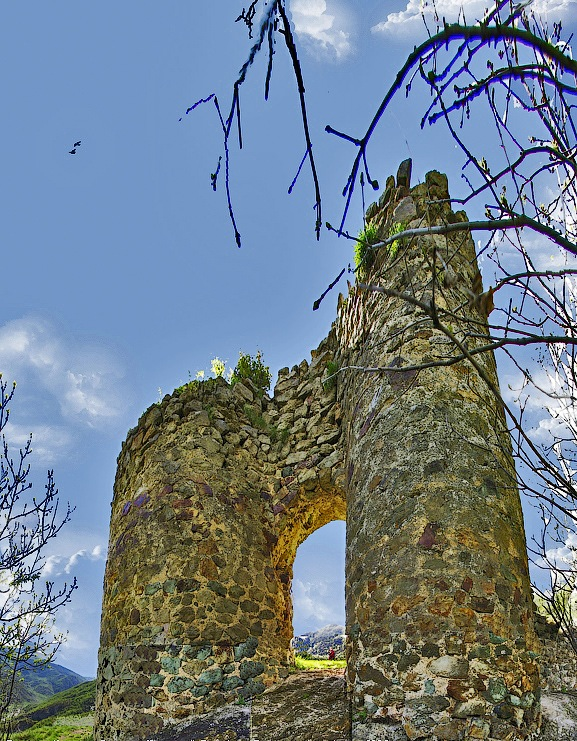
- Gates of Handaberd fortress

Site information
- Type: Castle

Location
- Coordinates: 40°13′37″N 46°08′16″E

Site history
- Built: 9th century
- Built by: Atrnerseh I

Handaberd (Armenian: Հանդաբերդ), also known as Lekh Castle (Azerbaijani: Lex qalası or Löh qalası) or Lev Castle, is a 9th-century fortress located in the Kalbajar District of Azerbaijan, near the villages of Lev and Knaravan, on the right bank of the Levçay River. It was built by Atrnerseh I, ruler of the Armenian Principality of Khachen, who resided there.

== History ==
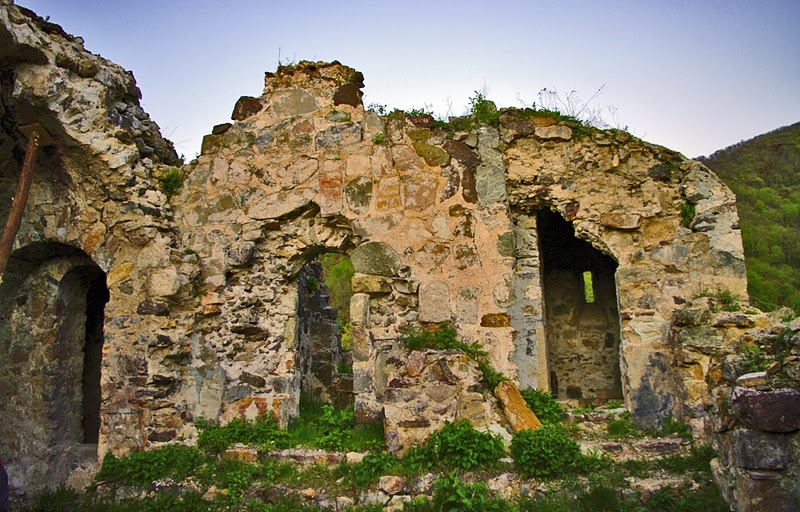
Handaberd monastery

One of several castles in the highlands of Kalbajar, Handaberd was constructed over the Ayrım Gorge, on a high mountain ridge surrounded by thick forest, 600 metres (2,000 ft) from the right bank of the Levçay River flowing by Ganlykend village. Handaberd is first mentioned as "Handu berd" by the 10th century Armenian historian Movses Kaghankatvatsi, who wrote in his work History of the Country of Albania that the fortress was built by Prince Atrnerseh of Khachen in the second quarter of the 9th century. Atrnerseh, a member of a branch of the Siunia dynasty, ruled over an area approximately corresponding to the historical Armenian province of Artsakh. Handaberd was located in the Tsar province (also known as Upper Khachen) of the Principality of Khachen․ It served as Atrnerseh's residence as well as a prison for prisoners sentenced to death.

According to the inscription on one of the khachkars kept at Dadivank, a nearby Armenian monastery, from 1142 to 1182 Handaberd belonged to Hasan I Vakhtangyan, prince of Upper Khachen. Some time after the initial construction under Atrnerseh, the fortress was significantly expanded. Around 1250, the fortress is mentioned in the history written by the Armenian historian Kirakos Gandzaketsi. According to one legend, the fortress was repaired using funds sent by Levon I, King of Cilician Armenia, and called Levonaberd (see variations thereof below) in his honor.

Handaberd's inscriptions were studied by the French orientalist Marie-Félicité Brosset in the mid-19th century. Less than a kilometer to the east of the fortress is a medieval monastery complex bearing the same name, which has also been excavated.

The fortress has historically been referred to by various names and renderings, such as Lev (also the Armenian name for the Levçay River), Levaghala, Levkala, Levonaberd, Lohaberd, Handberd, and Handuberd.

== Features ==
The castle is surrounded by steep rocks and streams from three sides, and looks like a natural rock relief. The only entrance to the castle is from the gates on the north-eastern edge. The internal length of the castle is 90 metres (300 ft), and its width is 35 to 40 metres (115 to 131 ft). The internal castle is in the higher south-western corner. The average thickness of the walls of Handaberd fortress is 1.3 metres (4.3 ft). There are 5-6 water wells 3 to 5 metres (10 to 16 ft) deep that were used for storage, the cooling of food, and as a source of drinking water. Nowadays, the walls are in ruins. Around Handaberd fortress, there are other smaller satellite castles on surrounding mountain peaks such as Pahak or Garavul (both meaning guard) and Jomard castles. Close to the Handaberd fortress there are two caves where archaeologists found items indicating the early presence of human beings.

The castle is designated as a place bearing state historical importance in Azerbaijan.

== Gallery ==
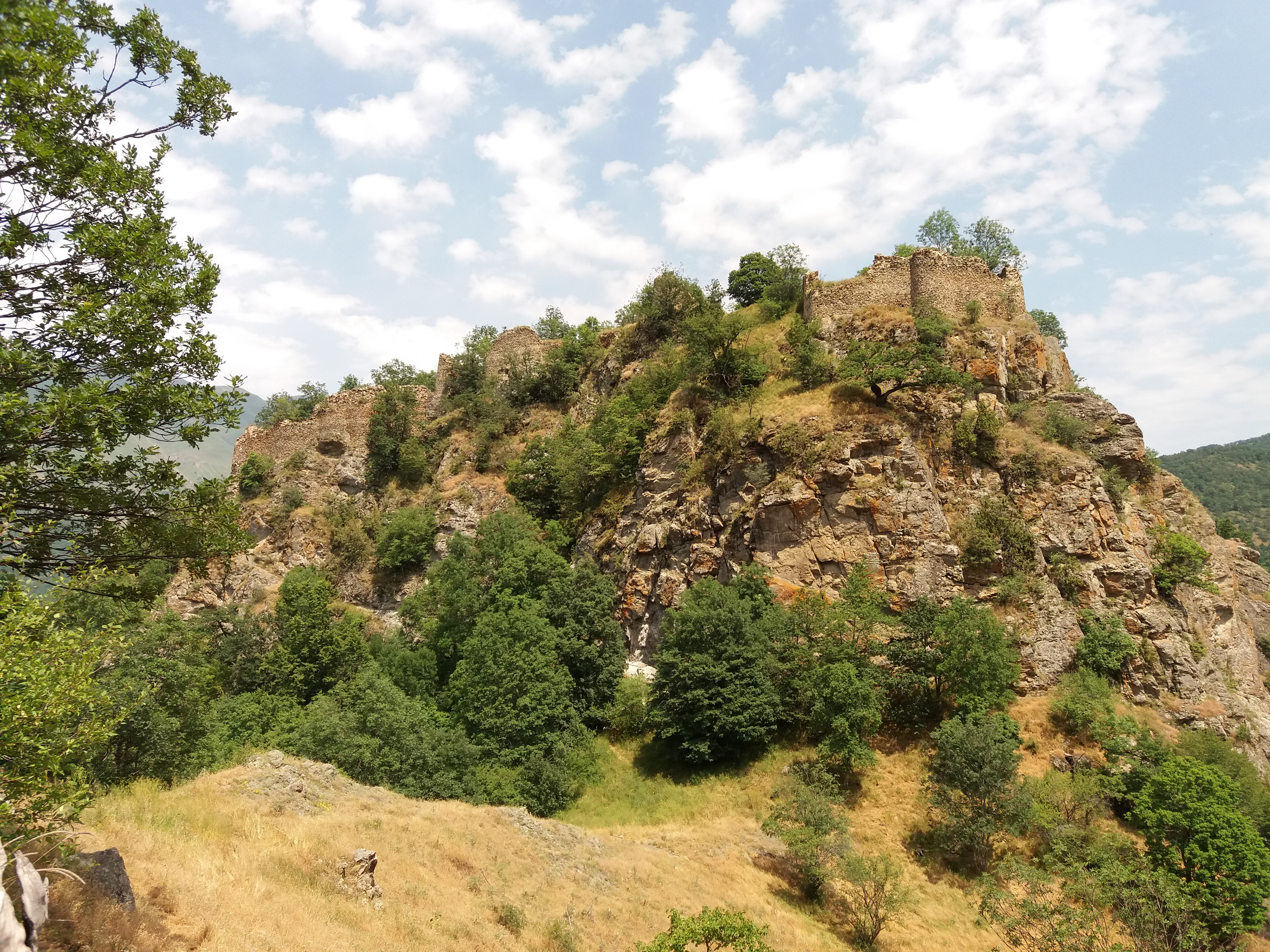
Handaberd fortress

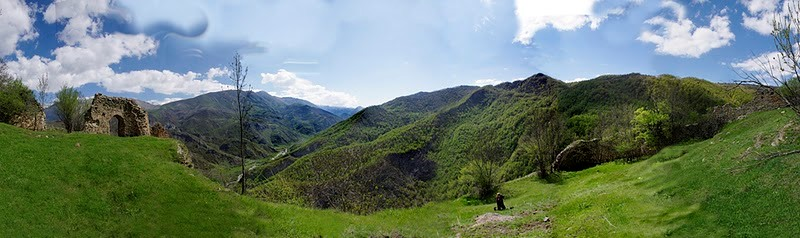
Gates, remains of the walls, view from the courtyard of the fortress

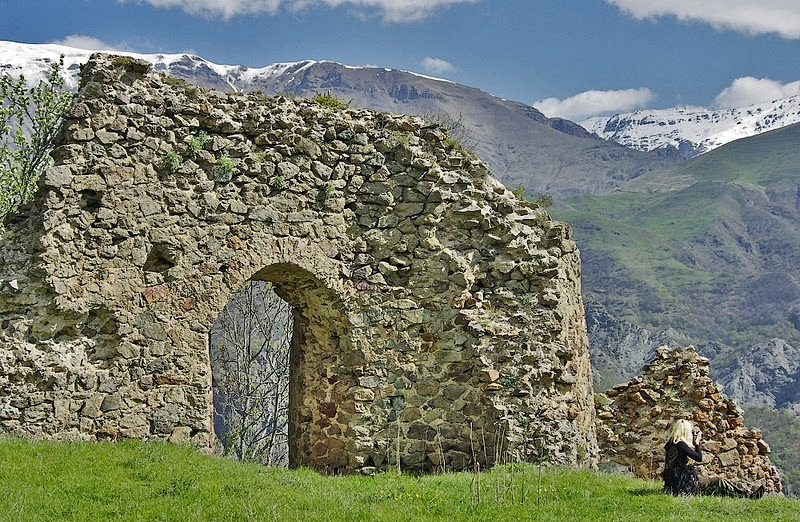
Fortress walls

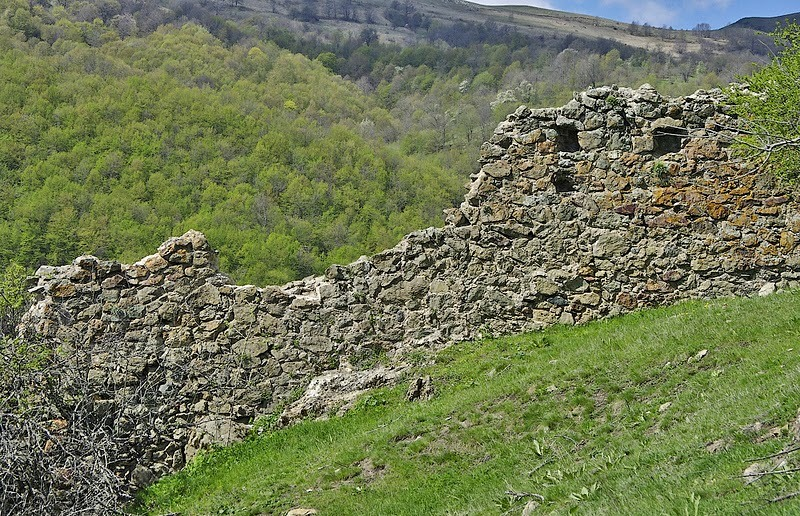
Fortress walls

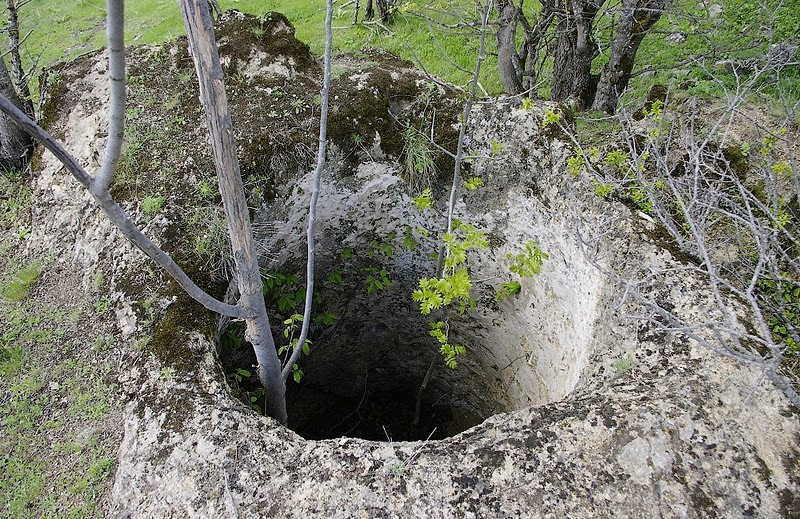
Tonir oven in the fortress

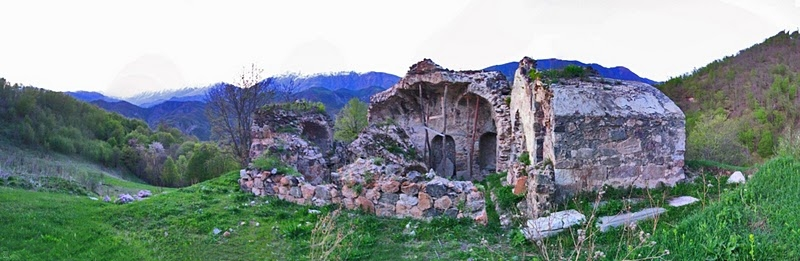
Handaberd monastery

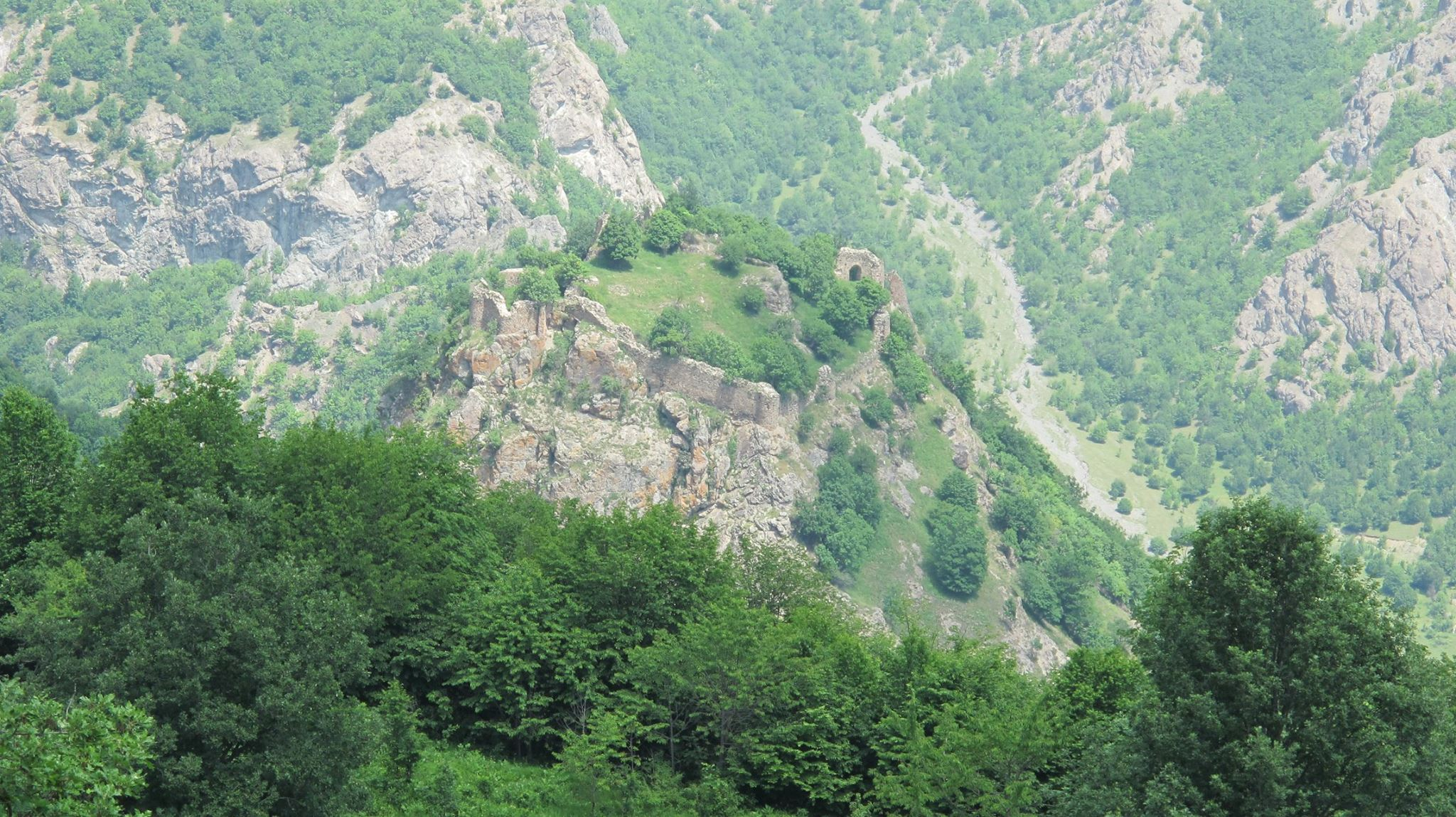
Handaberd fortress

== See also ==
- Kalbajar
- Shusha State Historical and Architectural Reserve
