= ATUC =

ATUC may refer to:

- Aberdeen Trades Union Council, a group of affiliated trade unions in Scotland
- Aden Trade Union Congress, a former trade union in South Yemen
- African Trade Union Confederation, a pan-African trade union federation
- African Trade Union Congress, a former Rhodesian and Zimbabwean trade union federation
- Azerbaijan Trade Unions Confederation, a national trade union centre in Azerbaijan

== See also ==
- Atuc, a village in Azerbaijan
- Atuk, an unfilmed American screenplay
