= Karabakh Range =

Mountain range in Lesser Caucasus

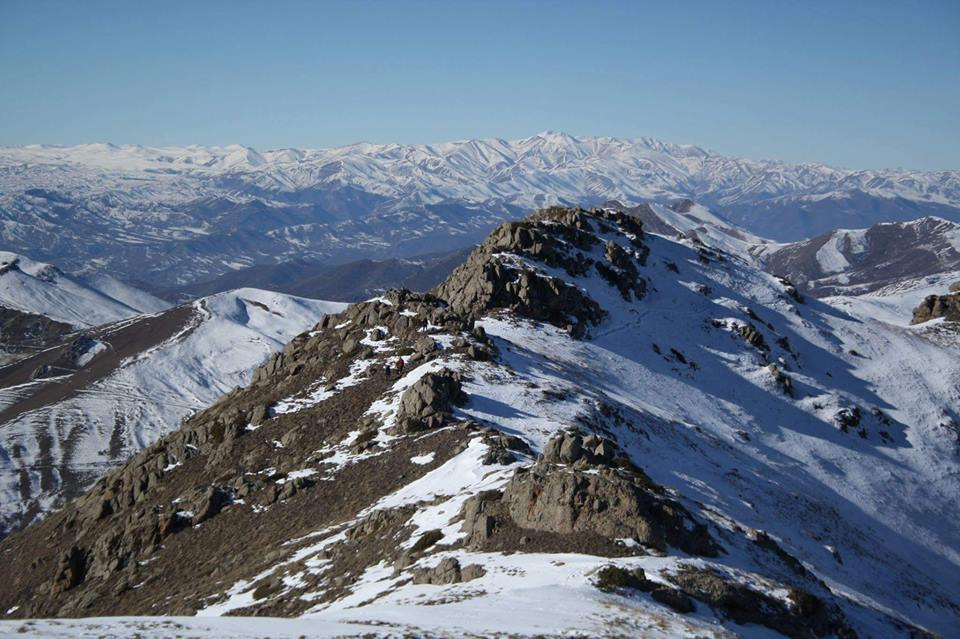
- Highest point in the Karabakh range, Mount Kirs

Highest point
- Peak: Mount Kirs
- Elevation: 2,724 m (8,937 ft)
- Coordinates: 39°42′0″N 46°44′30″E

Naming
- Native name: Qarabağ silsiləsi (Azerbaijani); Արցախի լեռնաշղթա (Armenian)

Geography
- Location within Azerbaijan
- Location: Azerbaijan, formerly Republic of Artsakh
- Range coordinates: 39°35′01″N 46°44′37″E
- Parent range: Lesser Caucasus

The Karabakh Range or Artsakh range is a mountain range of Lesser Caucasus. It stretches in an arc from North to South-East from Tartar river to Aras River. The Hakari River (left tributary of the Aras) separates it from the Karabakh Plateau. The highest point is Mount Kirs (Azerbaijani: Böyük Kirs Dağı, Armenian: Մեծ Քիրս լեռ, lit. 'Great Kirs') (2,725 m).

== Gallery ==
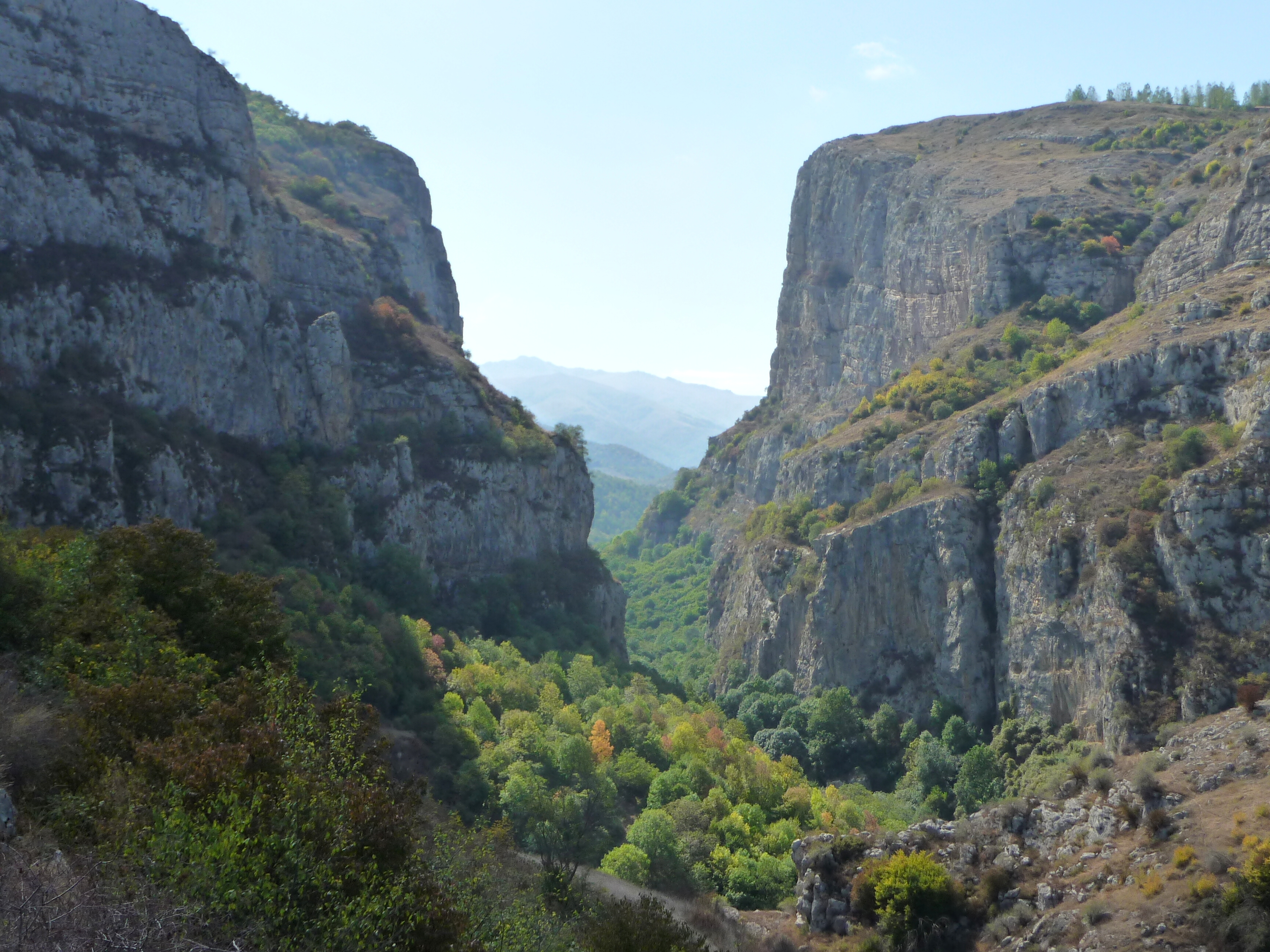
Canyon near Shusha

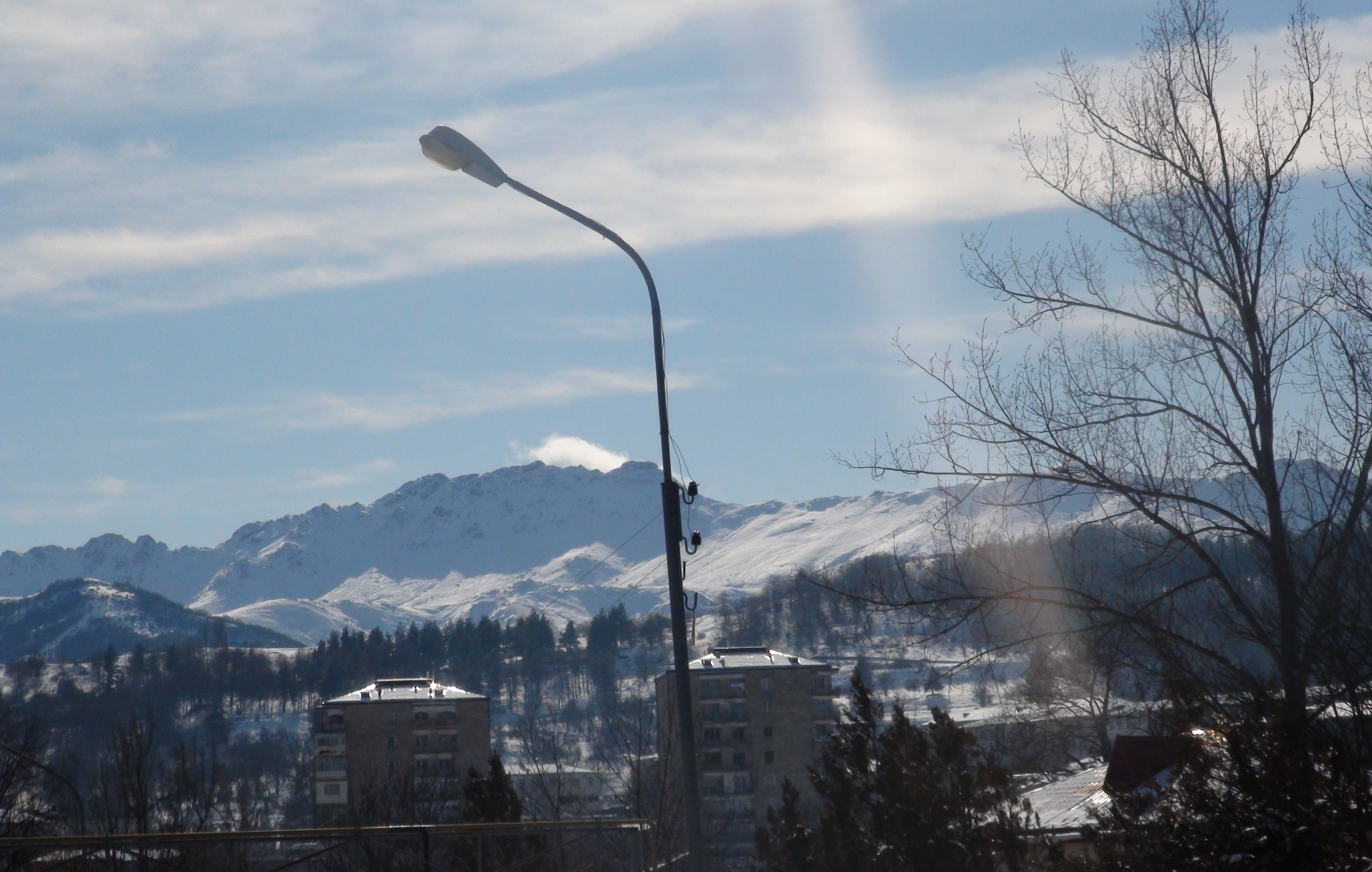
Mount Kirs as seen from Shusha
