= Khachinchay =

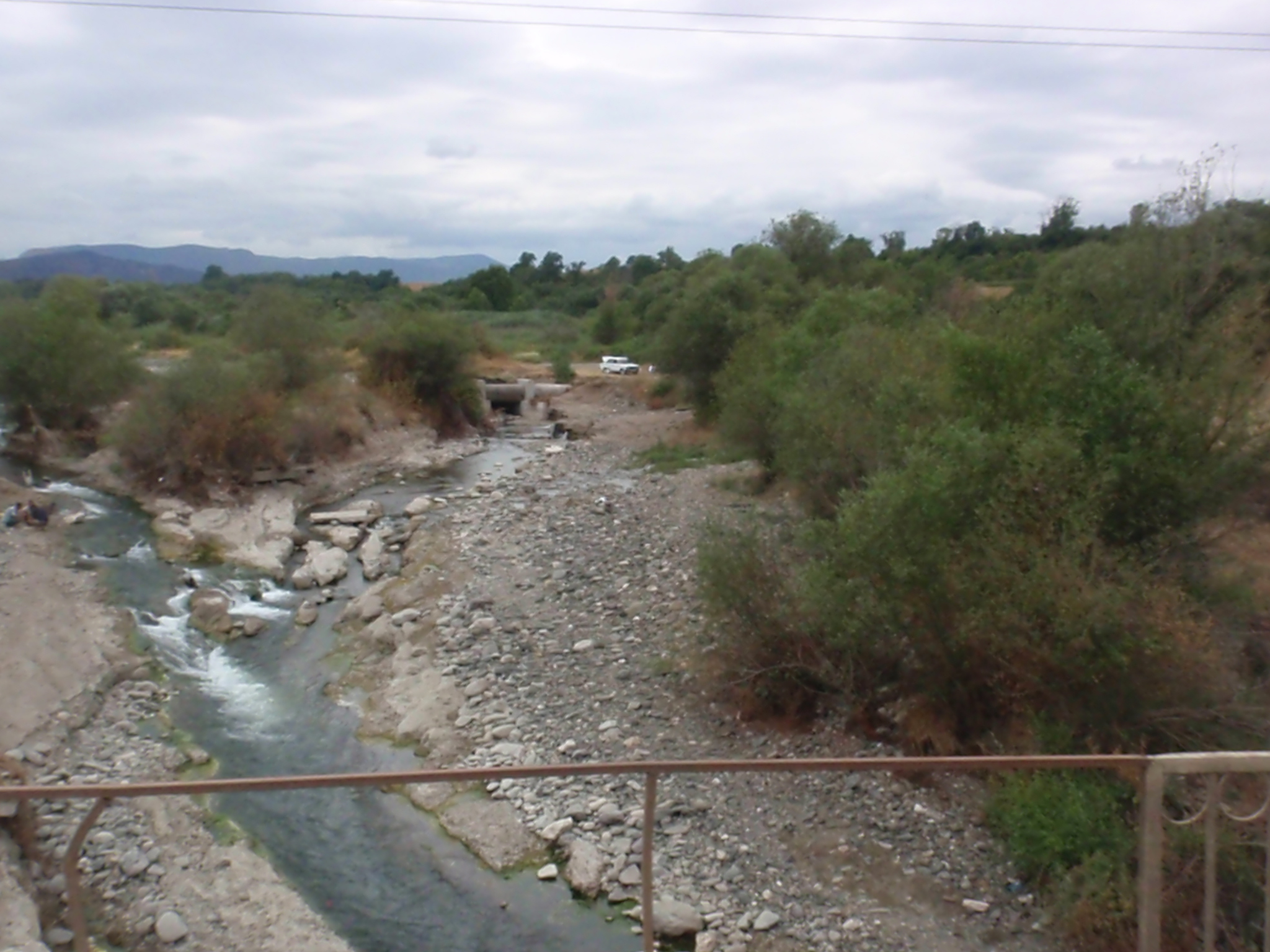
- Khachinchay flowing through Nagorno-Karabakh
- Native name: Xaçınçay (Azerbaijani)

Location
- Country: Azerbaijan
- Region: Caucasus
- District: Kalbajar, Aghdam, Tartar and Barda District

Physical characteristics
- Source: Karabakh Plateau
  - location: Azerbaijan
  - coordinates: 39°59′43″N 46°19′39″E
- Mouth: Kura
  - location: Azerbaijan
  - coordinates: 40°15′23″N 47°27′52″E
- Length: 119 km (74 mi)

Basin features
- Progression: Kura→ Caspian Sea

Khachinchay (Note: Armenian: Խաչեն, Khachen; Azerbaijani: Xaçınçay) is a river in Azerbaijan that passes through the region of Nagorno-Karabakh. It begins in the Karabakh Plateau, in the Kalbajar District and continues through the Aghdam, Tartar and Barda District. It enters the Kura on the right.

Khachinchay is 119 km (74 mi) long. The height difference between the source and the mouth is 2,900 m (9,500 ft).

== See also ==
- Bodies of water of Azerbaijan
