= Ruçuq =

- Location within Azerbaijan
- Coordinates: 41°08′03″N 48°37′28″E
- Country: Azerbaijan
- Rayon: Quba
- Municipality: Afurca
- Time zone: UTC+4 (AZT)
  - Summer (DST): UTC+5 (AZT)

Ruçuq (also, Ruchug, Ruchuk, and Ruchuk’, Gyshlag) is a village in the Quba Rayon of Azerbaijan. The village forms part of the municipality of Afurca.
