= Məncəroba =

- Location within Azerbaijan
- Coordinates: 41°32′28″N 48°47′48″E
- Country: Azerbaijan
- Rayon: Khachmaz
- Municipality: Çılğır
- Time zone: UTC+4 (AZT)
  - Summer (DST): UTC+5 (AZT)

Məncəroba (also, Mənçəroba, Mancharoba, and Mandzharoba) is a village in the Khachmaz Rayon of Azerbaijan. The village forms part of the municipality of Çılğır.
