= Qayadalı =

- Location within Azerbaijan
- Coordinates: 41°07′33″N 48°27′25″E
- Country: Azerbaijan
- Rayon: Quba
- Municipality: Yerfi
- Time zone: UTC+4 (AZT)
  - Summer (DST): UTC+5 (AZT)

Qayadalı (also, Qaya-dalı) is a village in the Quba Rayon of Azerbaijan. The village forms part of the municipality of Yerfi.
