= Gashgachay (river) =

- Native name: Azerbaijani: Qaşqaçay

Physical characteristics
- Length: 33 km (21 mi)
- Basin size: 136 км²

Gashgachay, in the lower reaches of the Durujachay (Azerbaijani: Qaşqaçay) is a river in Azerbaijan, the right tributary of Ayrichay. It flows through the territory of Gakh, and partially of Sheki districts. It has a length of 33 km, and basin area of 136 km^{2}.

== Description ==
The source of Gashgachay is located on the southern slope of the main Caucasian range, at an altitude of 2200 m. The river is fed mainly by underground and rain waters. The water of Ayrichay is used for irrigation. It flows in general in the south-western direction. On the river are established the settlements of Armudlu, Gashgachay, Bilajik, Gazmalar, Baidarly, Onjalli. In the upper reaches of the river there are hornbeam-oak forests.

== Toponym ==
In Azerbaijani, the name of the river means "a river flowing from the edge of the slope".

== See also ==
- Velvelechay
