= Mount Boyuk Kirs =

Mountain in Azerbaijan

Boyuk Kirs
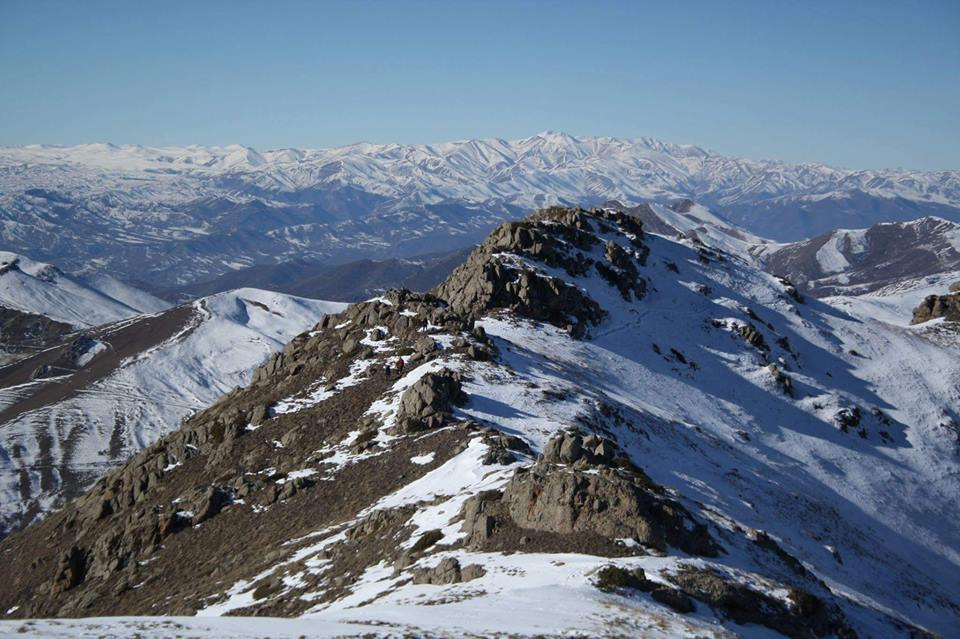

Highest point
- Elevation: 2,725 m (8,940 ft)
- Coordinates: 39°38′51″N 46°44′45″E

Naming
- Native name: Böyük Kirs dağı (Azerbaijani)

Geography
- Location within Caucasus Mountains Location within Azerbaijan
- Country: Azerbaijan

Mount Boyuk Kirs (Azerbaijani: Böyük Kirs dağı — Mount Big Kirs) is one of the highest peaks in the Karabakh Range of the Lesser Caucasus in Azerbaijan at an altitude of 2,725 metres above sea level. Before the 2020 Nagorno-Karabakh War, it was the highest mountain of the breakaway Republic of Arstakh. It forms the border between the Khojavend and Shusha districts of Azerbaijan. The mountain is formed by volcanic rocks dating to the Middle Jurassic.

== Toponymy ==
The mount is named so as to distinguish it from the oronym Kichik Kirs. Kirs is used as a toponymic term meaning "swollen hill, steep mountain".

== Geology ==
The mount is part of the geological Lachyn subzone, which is a narrow Jurassic rock with some Albian-Cenomanian transgressive mantle, over 70 km long, and 2-8 km wide. The subzone is traced from the interfluve of the Pichanis and the Shalva in the northeast, to the left bank of the Araz in the southeast.

== Gallery ==
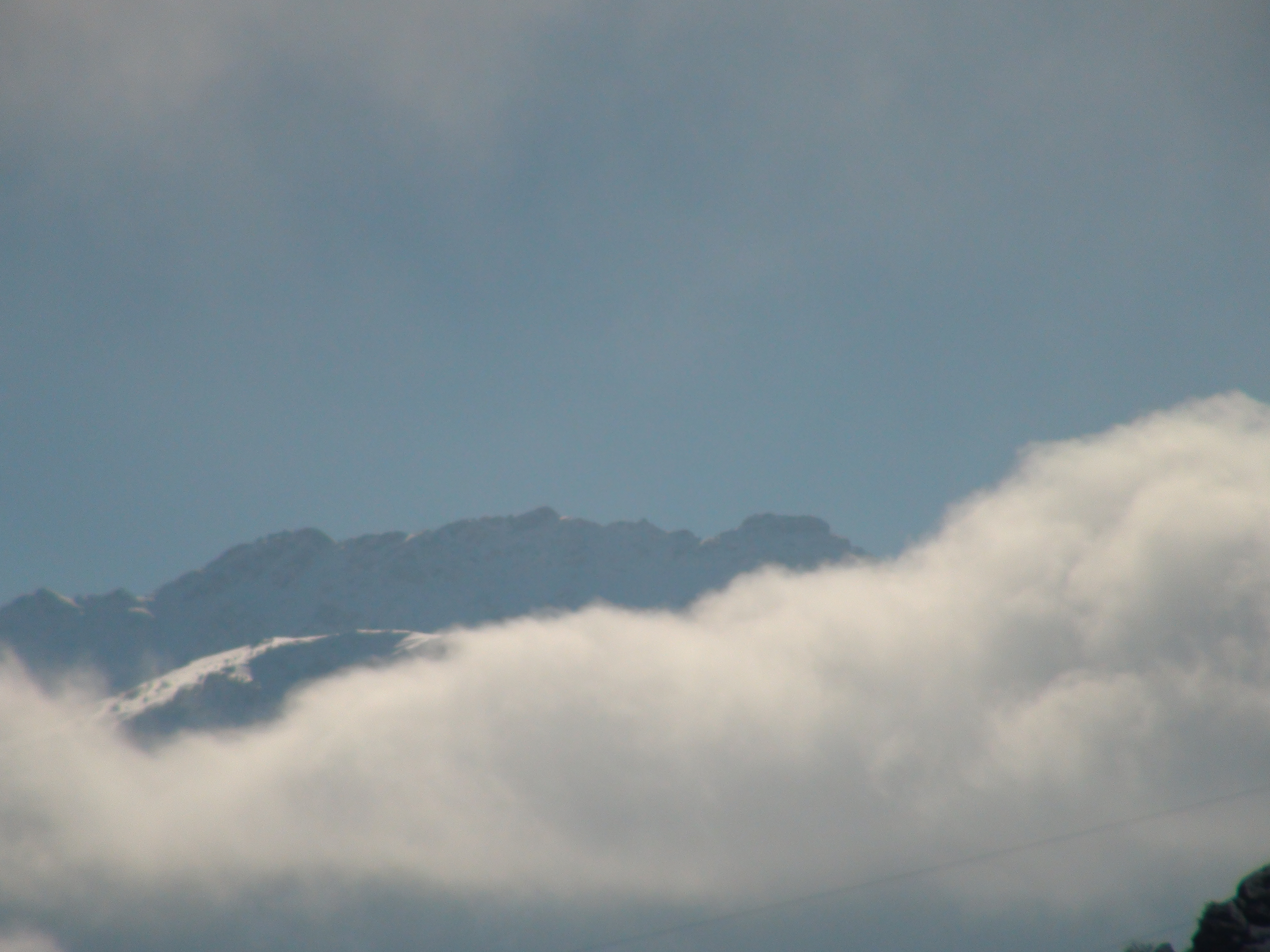
Mount Boyuk Kirs as seen from the Shusha District during winter.

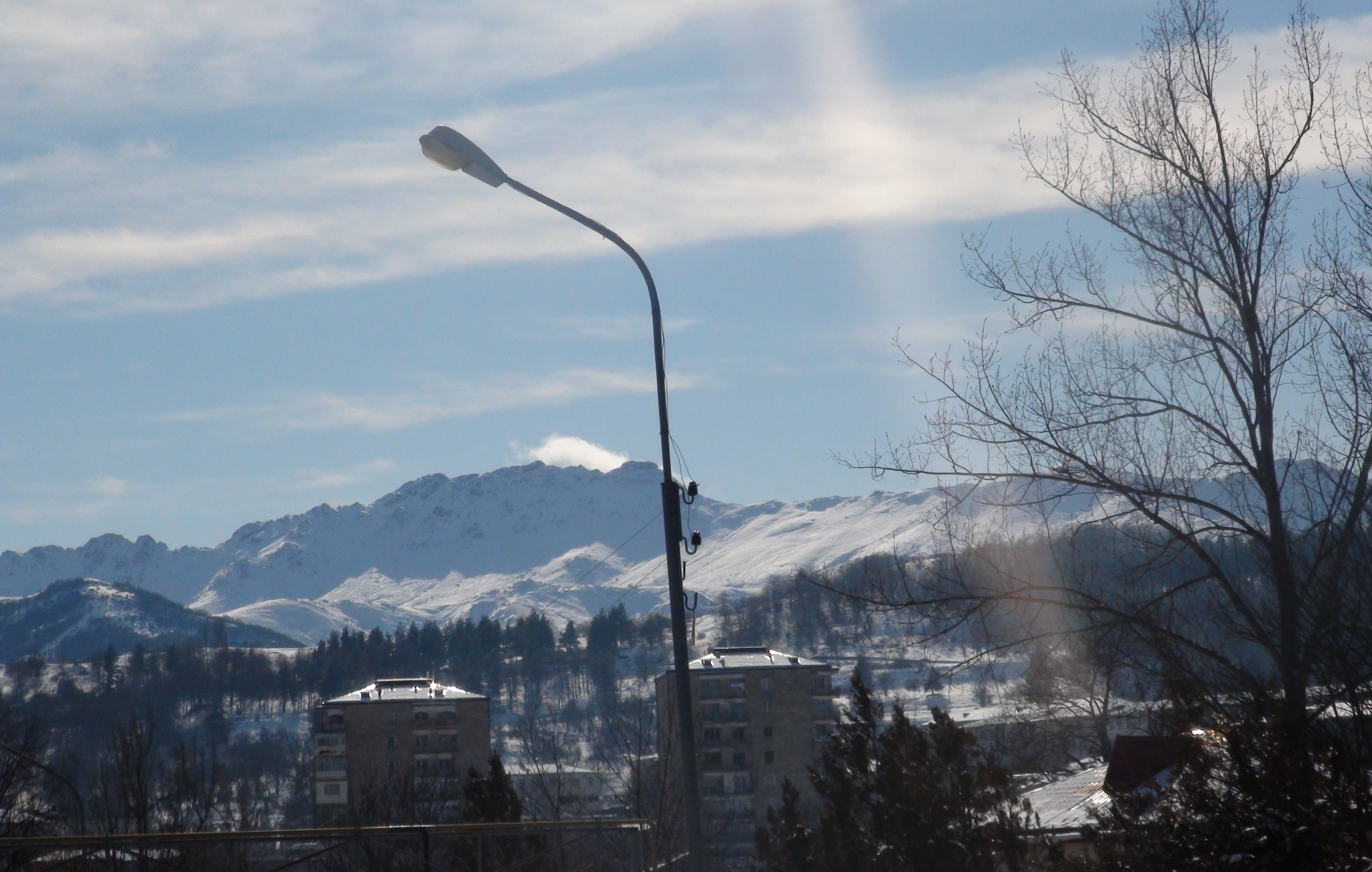
Mount Boyuk Kirs as seen from the city of Shusha

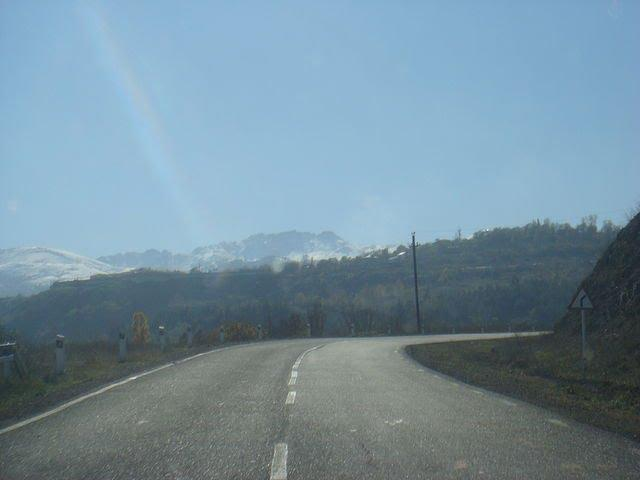
Mount Boyuk Kirs as seen from a road
