= Turağayçay =

Location
- Country: Azerbaijan
- District: Tartar

Physical characteristics
- Source: Lesser Caucasus
  - elevation: 682 m (2,238 ft)
- Mouth: Tartarchay
  - location: downstream of Sarsang Reservoir
  - coordinates: 40°14′30″N 46°39′59″E
  - elevation: 576 m (1,890 ft)
- Length: 35 km (22 mi)
- Discharge
  - location: directly downstream into Tartarchay

Basin features
- Progression: Tartar→ Kura→ Caspian Sea

The Turağayçay is one of the tributaries of Tartarchay located in Tartar District of Azerbaijan.

== Overview ==
The Turağayçay, a left tributary of the Tartarchay, is a 35 km (22 mi) long river flowing from an altitude of 682 m (2,238 ft) in eastern Tartar Rayon into the Tartarchay at an altitude of 576 m (1,890 ft) which then proceeds west through Tartar and Barda districts, flowing into the Kura in the latter district.

== See also ==
- Rivers and lakes in Azerbaijan
- Tartarchay
- Levçay
- Ağdabançay
- Qarqarçay
