= Dərk =

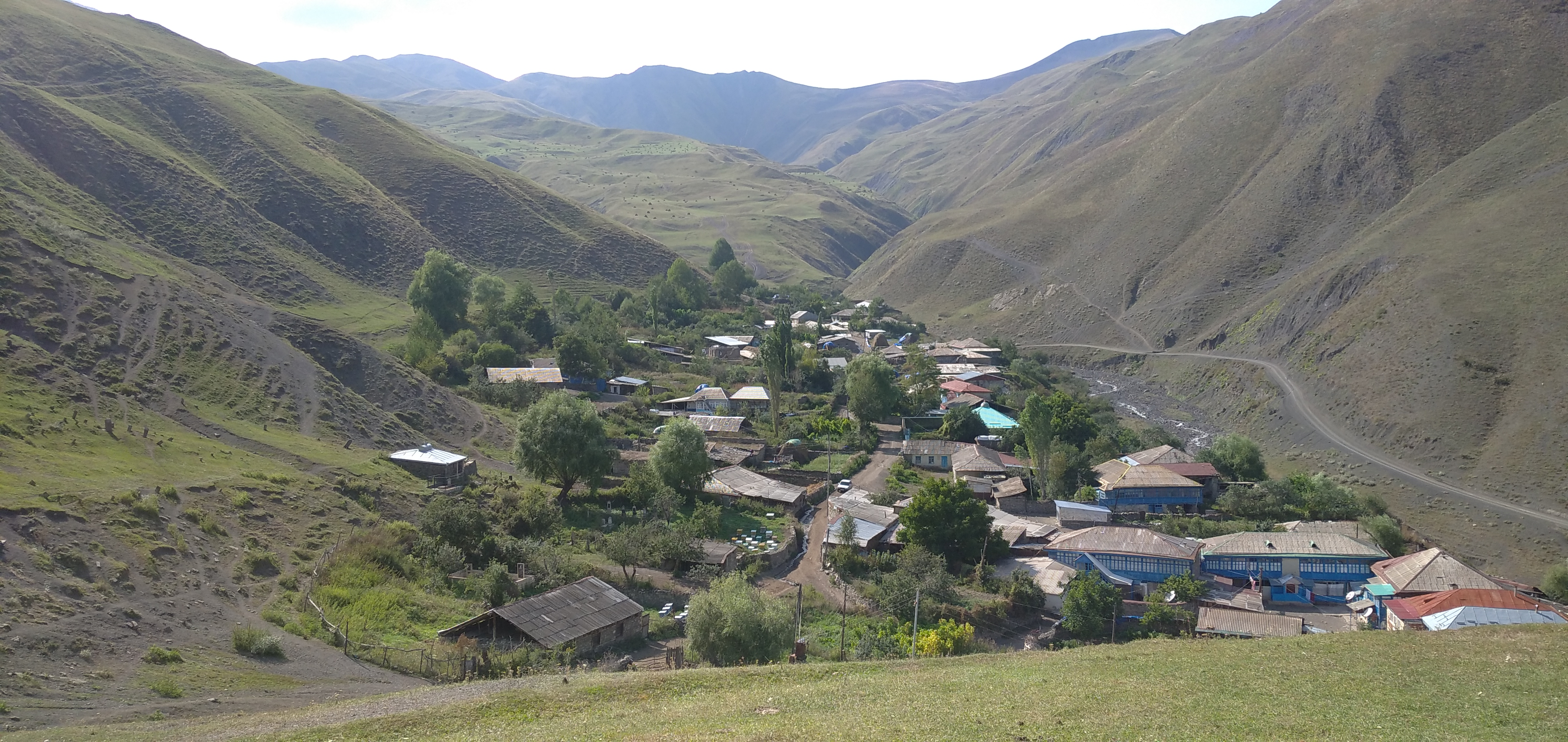

- Location within Azerbaijan
- Coordinates: 41°04′59″N 48°24′58″E
- Country: Azerbaijan
- Rayon: Quba
- Municipality: Yerfi
- Time zone: UTC+4 (AZT)
  - Summer (DST): UTC+5 (AZT)

Dərk (also, Derk) is a village in the Quba Rayon of Azerbaijan. The village forms part of the municipality of Yerfi.
