= Çayqaraqaşlı =

- Municipality
- Location within Azerbaijan
- Coordinates: 41°22′46″N 49°02′14″E
- Country: Azerbaijan
- Rayon: Davachi District

Population
  - Total: 451
- Time zone: UTC+4 (AZT)
  - Summer (DST): UTC+5 (AZT)

Çayqaraqaşlı (also, Çay Qaraqaşlı and Chaykarakashly) is a village and municipality in the Shabran District of Azerbaijan. It has a population of 451.
