= Yerfi =

- Municipality
- Location within Azerbaijan
- Coordinates: 41°06′00″N 48°28′54″E
- Country: Azerbaijan
- Rayon: Quba

Population
  - Total: 915
- Time zone: UTC+4 (AZT)
  - Summer (DST): UTC+5 (AZT)

Yerfi is a village and municipality in the Quba Rayon of Azerbaijan. It has a population of 915. The municipality consists of the villages of Yerfi, Talış, Dərk, Qayadalı, and Nohurdüzü.
