= Çılğır =

- Municipality
- Location within Azerbaijan
- Coordinates: 41°31′50″N 48°46′55″E
- Country: Azerbaijan
- Rayon: Khachmaz

Population
  - Total: 609
- Time zone: UTC+4 (AZT)
  - Summer (DST): UTC+5 (AZT)

Çılğır (also, Çiləqir, Çiləgir, and Chilegir) is a village and municipality in the Khachmaz Rayon of Azerbaijan. It has a population of 609. The municipality consists of the villages of Çılğır and Məncəroba.

== Bibliography ==
- Çılğır (as Çiləgir) at GEOnet Names Server
