= Afurca =

- Municipality
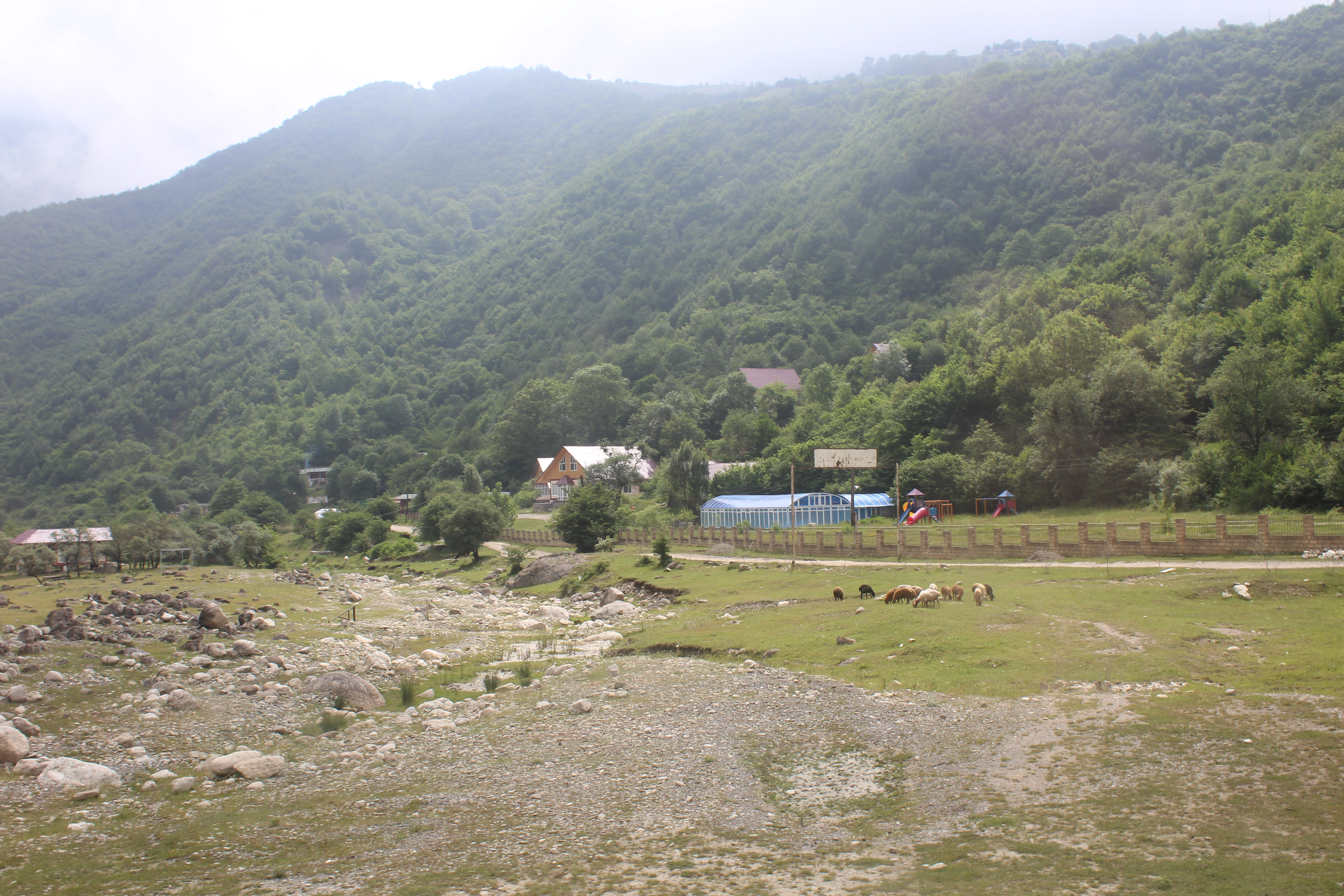

- Location within Azerbaijan
- Coordinates: 41°09′39″N 48°36′56″E
- Country: Azerbaijan
- Rayon: Quba
- Elevation: 970 m (3,180 ft)

Population
  - Total: 819
- Time zone: UTC+4 (AZT)
  - Summer (DST): UTC+5 (AZT)

Afurca (Tat: Afurcə) is a village and municipality in the Quba Rayon of Azerbaijan. It has a population of 819. The municipality consists of the villages of Afurca, Atuc, Ruçuq, and Fırıq.
