= Çiləgir, Khachmaz =

Çiləgir
- Location within Azerbaijan
- Coordinates: 41°22′12″N 48°48′29″E
- Country: Azerbaijan
- Rayon: Khachmaz

Population
  - Total: 1,355
- Time zone: UTC+4 (AZT)
  - Summer (DST): UTC+5 (AZT)

Çiləgir (also, Chilegir and Chilagir) is a village in the Khachmaz Rayon of Azerbaijan. It has a population of 1,355.
