= Vəlvələ =

- Municipality
- Location within Azerbaijan
- Coordinates: 41°20′20″N 48°46′42″E
- Country: Azerbaijan
- Rayon: Quba

Population (2009)
  - Total: 1,482
- Time zone: UTC+4 (AZT)
  - Summer (DST): UTC+5 (AZT)

Vəlvələ (also, Vel’veli) is a village and municipality in the Quba Rayon of Azerbaijan. In 2009, it had a population of 1482.
