= Atuc =

- Location within Azerbaijan
- Coordinates: 41°06′41″N 48°36′50″E
- Country: Azerbaijan
- Rayon: Quba
- Municipality: Afurca

Population (2009)
  - Total: 19
- Time zone: UTC+4 (AZT)
  - Summer (DST): UTC+5 (AZT)

Atuc (also, Atuch) is a village in the Quba Rayon of Azerbaijan. The village forms part of the municipality of Afurca.
