= Tartar (river) =

River in Azerbaijan

Tartarchay Tartar, Թարթառ
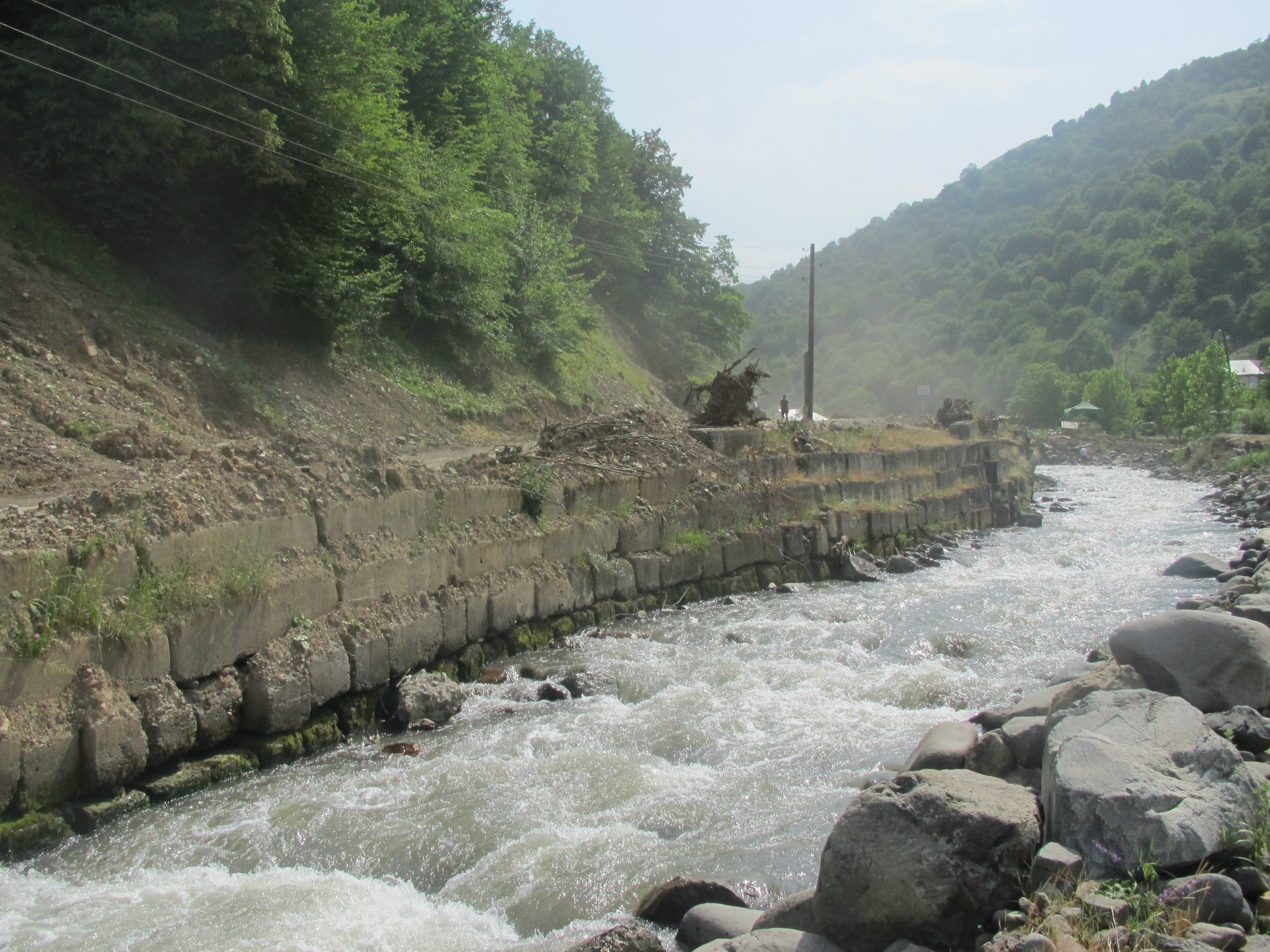
- Native name: Tərtərçay (Azerbaijani)

Location
- Country: Azerbaijan
- Region: Caucasus
- Districts: Kalbajar, Barda, Tartar
- Cities: Kalbajar, Tartar, Barda

Physical characteristics
- Source: Lesser Caucasus
  - location: Near Istisu, Kalbajar District, Azerbaijan
  - coordinates: 39°55′56″N 45°58′6″E
  - elevation: 3,120 m (10,240 ft)
- Mouth: Kura
  - location: Barda, Azerbaijan
  - coordinates: 40°26′49″N 47°18′26″E
- Length: 184 km (114 mi)
- Basin size: 2,650 km^{2} (1,020 sq mi)
- Discharge
  - location: directly downstream into Kura
  - average: 22 m^{3}/s (780 cu ft/s)

Basin features
- Progression: Kura→ Caspian Sea
- Tributaries
  - left: Levçay, Ağdabançay
  - right: Turağayçay

The Tartar (Azerbaijani: Tərtərçay, Armenian: Թարթառ) is one of the tributaries of the Kura river located in Azerbaijan. It passes through the districts of Kalbajar, Barda and Tartar.

== Overview ==
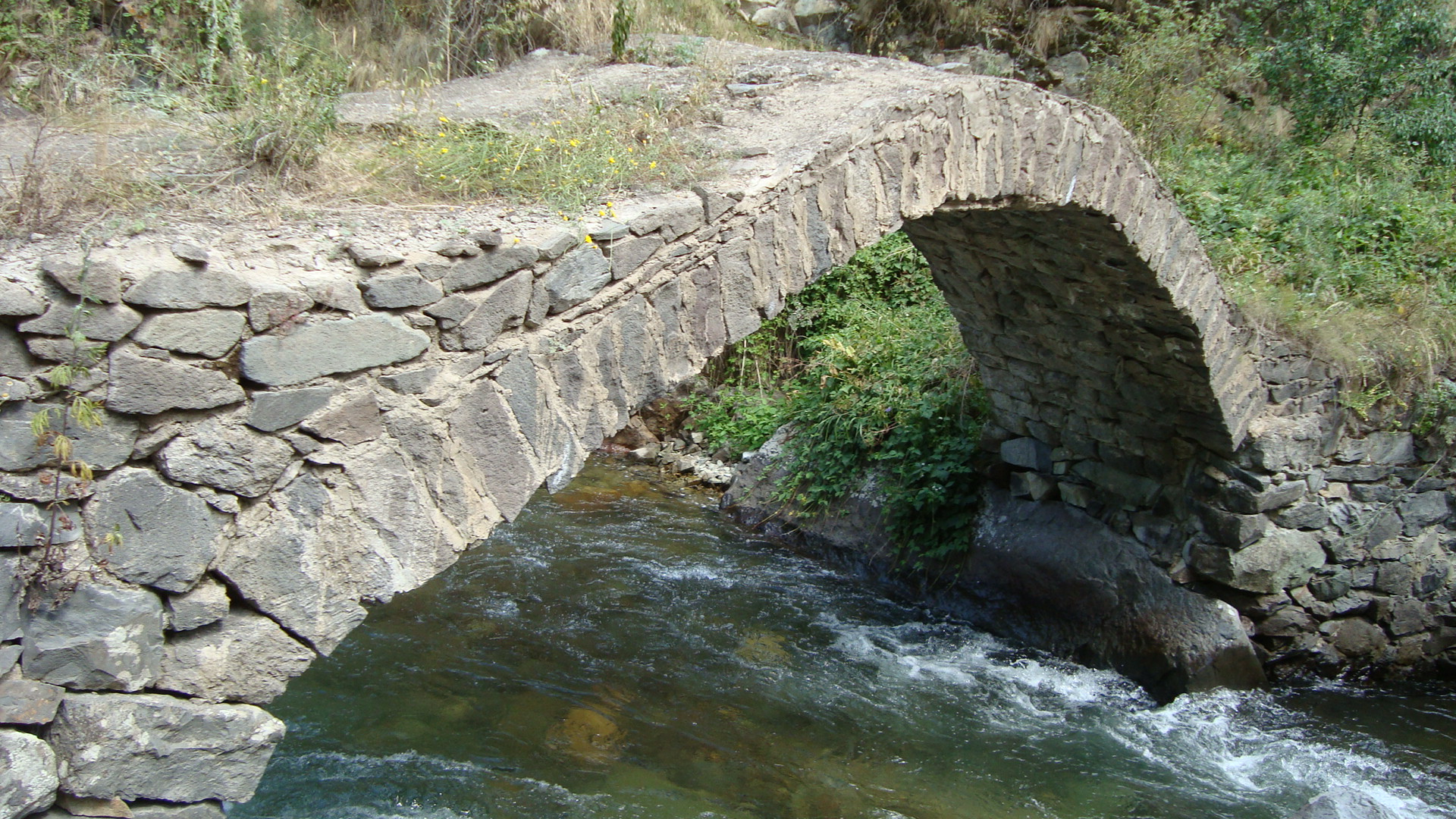
Tartar River

The Tartar is a left tributary of the Kura, the largest river in the Caucasus. The river originates in the area where Qonqur, Alaköz and Mıxtökən mountain ranges meet on the Karabakh Plateau in the vicinity of the hot springs village of Istisu located in Kalbajar Rayon of Azerbaijan. The river originates from mountain springs at 3,120 m (10,240 ft) above sea level. The river flows eastward through the whole Kalbajar District, passing through Kalbajar city, Tartar and Barda districts and through Tartar and Barda cities before discharging into the Kura. The river has two left tributaries: the Levçay (36 km (22 mi)) and the Ağdabançay (19 km (12 mi)), and one right tributary, the Turağayçay (35 km (22 mi)). Sarsang reservoir was built on Tartar river in 1976 for electricity generation and irrigation purposes.

== Statistical information ==
The river is 184 km (114 mi) long, and has a drainage basin of 2,650 km^{2} (1,020 sq mi). The Tartarchay is considered one of the water-rich tributaries of the Kura within Azerbaijani territory. The water volumes are sourced from rainfall (14%), snow (28%) and underground springs (58%). During spring and summer months, the snow melting in the mountains causes floods, making up 65–70% of the annual water flow. In August and September, the water levels decrease. From October until November, the rainfall increases the water levels again. The average annual discharge of the river is 22 m^{3}/s (780 cu ft/s). Average annual flow is 693.8 million m^{3}. The average mineralization of the river is 300–500 mg/L with hydrocarbons and calcium.

== Water uses ==
What was once the famous resort village of Istisu (lit. 'Hot Water' in Azerbaijani), which was occupied and ruined following the First Nagorno-Karabakh War, is located on the lower part of the river. The resort contains both natural drinking mineral water and hot water spring for bathing. Sarsang Hydro Power Plant with capacity of 50 megawatts is operated at the Sarsang reservoir of the river and is the main source of electric energy for the Republic of Artsakh (40–60%).

== See also ==
- Rivers and lakes in Azerbaijan
- Qarqar River
- Terteroba
