= Qarqarçay =

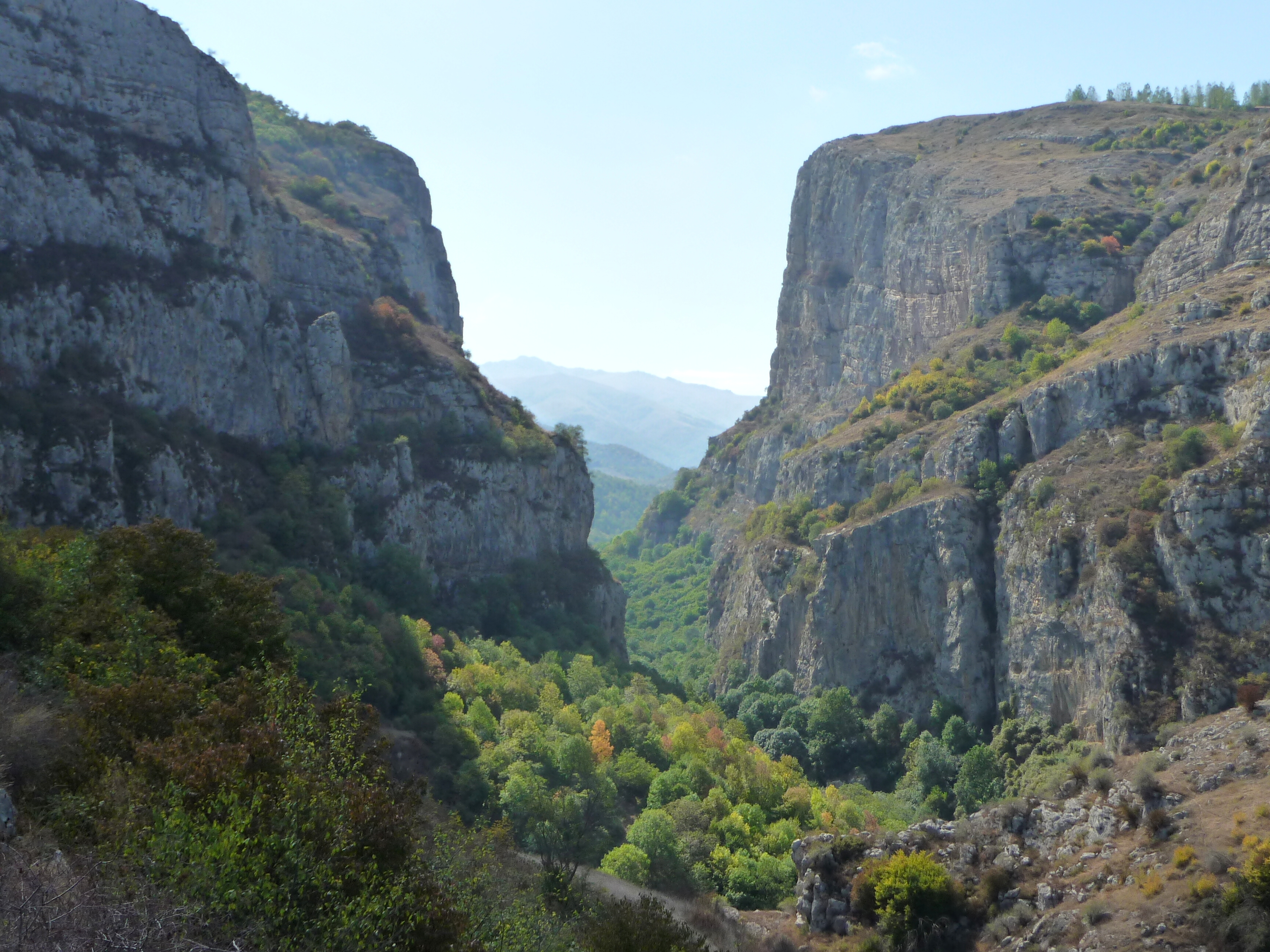
- Canyon of the Qarqarçay

Location
- Country: Azerbaijan

Physical characteristics
- Mouth: Kura
  - coordinates: 40°09′32″N 47°32′06″E
- Length: 115 km (71 mi)
- Basin size: 1,490 km^{2} (580 sq mi)

Basin features
- Progression: Kura→ Caspian Sea

The Qarqarçay (Gargarchay), Qarqar, or Karkar (Armenian: Կարկառ) is a river located in Azerbaijan, in the drainage basin of the Kura. Parts of the river flow through Nagorno Karabakh. Its length is 115 kilometres (71 mi), and the area of the basin 1,490 square kilometres (580 sq mi). The river begins on the Karabakh Plateau at an altitude of 2,080 metres (6,820 ft) and is formed by the confluence of the rivers Zarysly and Khalfali. The main tributaries are the Ballyja, Badara and Daghdaghan. The Qarqar is fed by rain, snow and underground waters.

The Askeran fortress is situated on the banks of the Qarqar.

== Hydronym ==
Qarqarçay, anglicized as Gargarchay, consists of the name Gargar and the Turkic word chay (çay), meaning "river". German scientist Heinrich Hübschmann explains that Karkar (Armenian: Կարկառ) is etymologized from Armenian – meaning “heap of stones”.

== Gallery ==
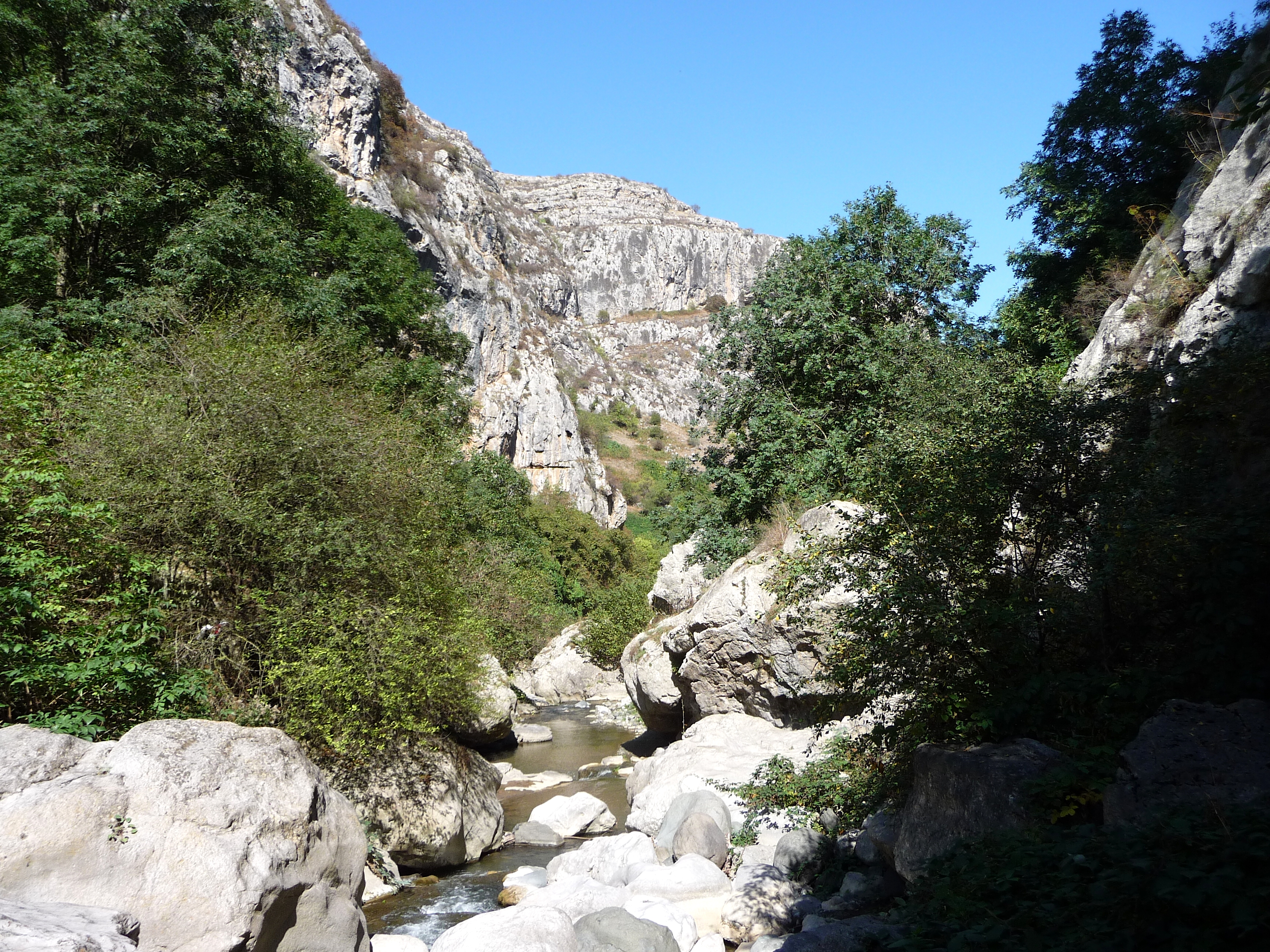
Qarqar river

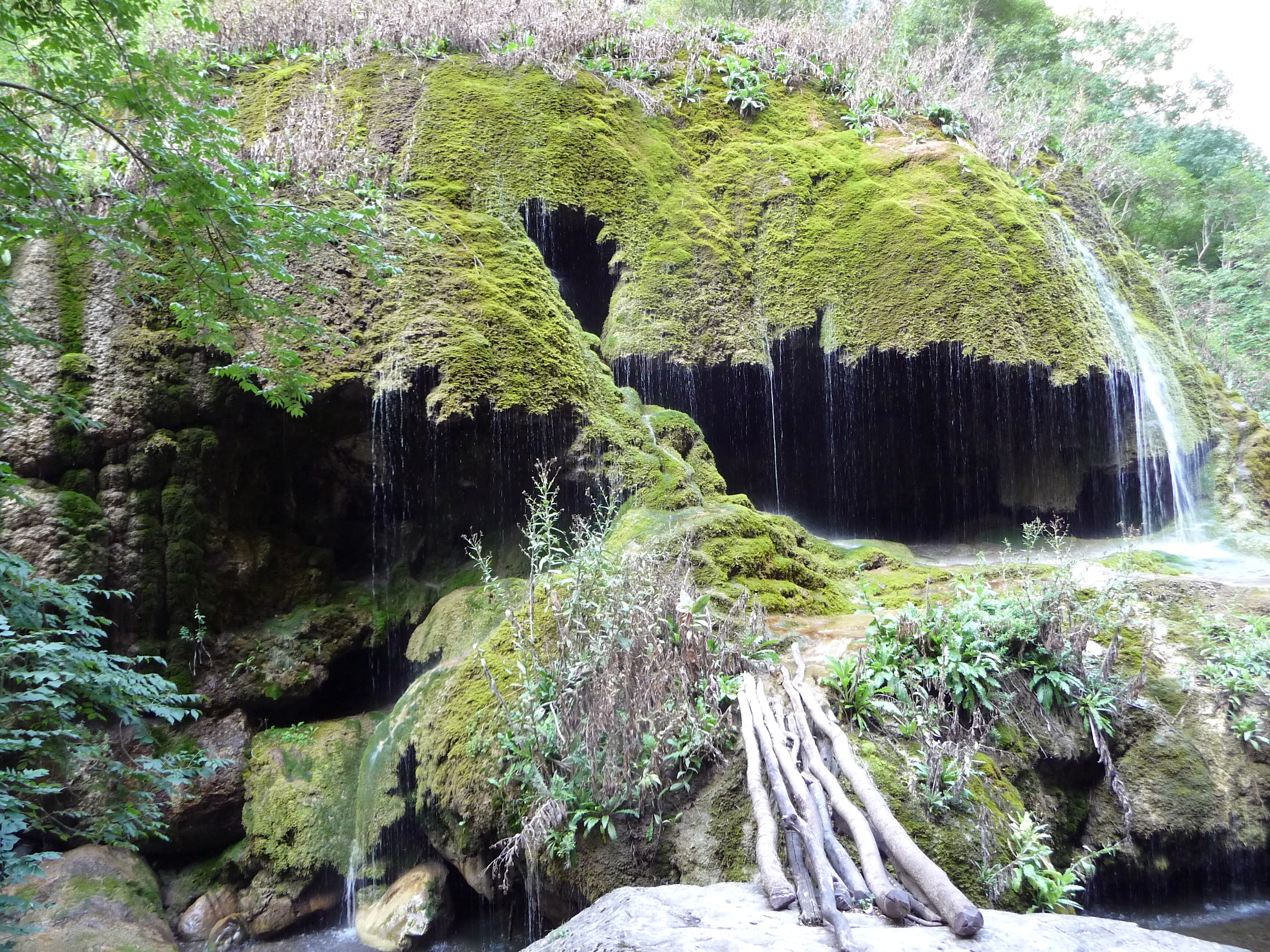
"Zontik" (Umbrella) natural monument

== See also ==
- Rivers and lakes in Azerbaijan
- Tartarchay
