= Levçay =

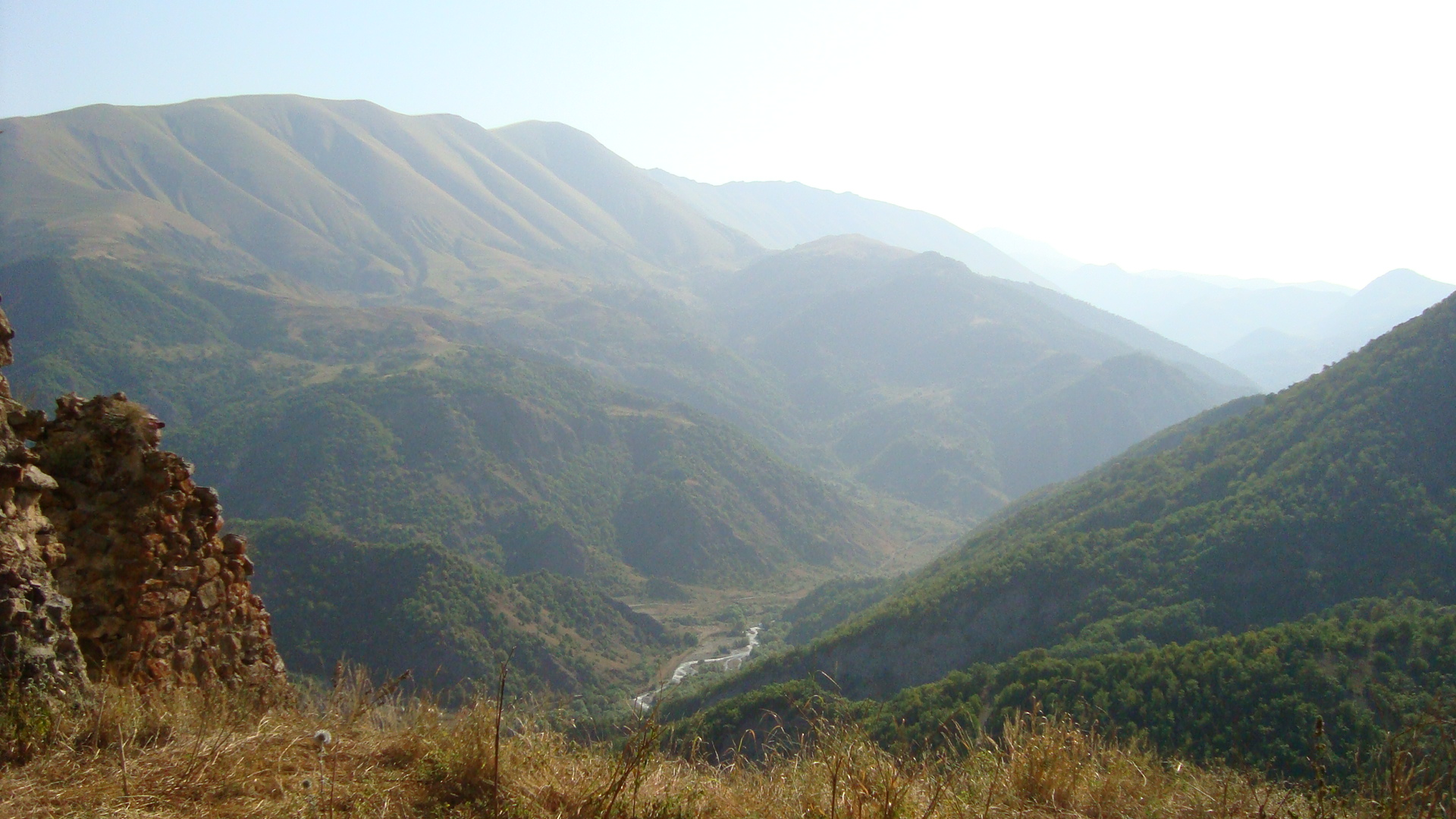
- The Levçay flowing in Kalbajar District

Location
- Country: Azerbaijan
- Region: Caucasus
- District: Kalbajar
- City: Kalbajar

Physical characteristics
- Source: Lesser Caucasus
  - elevation: 1,284 m (4,213 ft)
- Mouth: Tartarchay
  - location: Qamışlı, Kalbajar, Azerbaijan
  - coordinates: 40°10′25″N 46°11′57″E
- Length: 36 km (22 mi)
- Discharge
  - location: directly downstream into Tartarcahy

Basin features
- Progression: Tartar→ Kura→ Caspian Sea

The Levçay is one of the tributaries of Tartarchay River in western Azerbaijan.

== Overview ==
The Levçay is a 36-kilometre (22 mi) long river originating from the Murovdag range and flowing in central Kalbajar District into the Tartarchay as its left tributary. The latter proceeds west through the Tartar and Barda districts and flows into the Kura as a right-bank tributary.

== See also ==
- Rivers and lakes in Azerbaijan
- Ağdabançay
- Turağayçay
- Qarqar River
