= Karabakh Plateau =

Volcanic plateau of the Lesser Caucasus

Coordinates: 39.5840°N 46.1761°E

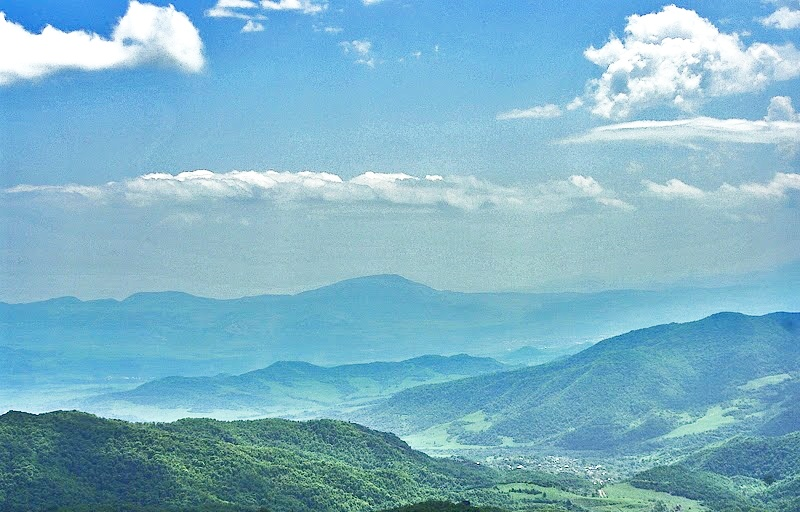
View of Kachaghakaberd

The Karabakh Plateau (Armenian: Ղարաբաղի բարձրավանդակ; Azerbaijani: Qarabağ yaylası) or Syunik Plateau (Armenian: Սյունիքի բարձրավանդակ, romanized: Syuniki bardzravandak) is a volcanic plateau of the Lesser Caucasus, in Armenia and Azerbaijan, in the most eastern point of Armenian Highlands. It extends from the south of the Murovdag/Mrav range towards the East Sevan Range. (The Great Soviet Encyclopedia locates the plateau (Карабахское нагорье) between the Zangezur Mountains and the Karabakh Range.) The Hakari river (Akera, Akari, left tributary of the Aras) separates it form the Karabakh Range. The highest point is Dəlidağ (3616 m). It features a number of extinct volcanoes, the highest being Qızılboğaz (3581 m).
