= Kəbirli =

Kəbirli or Kebirli or Kyabirli may refer to:

- Kəbirli, Aghjabadi, Azerbaijan
- Kəbirli, Beylagan, Azerbaijan
- Kəbirli, Tartar, Azerbaijan
