= Shahbulag Castle =

Castle in Agdam, Azerbaijan

- Şahbulaq qalası قلعه شاهبولاگ
- Agdam District, Azerbaijan
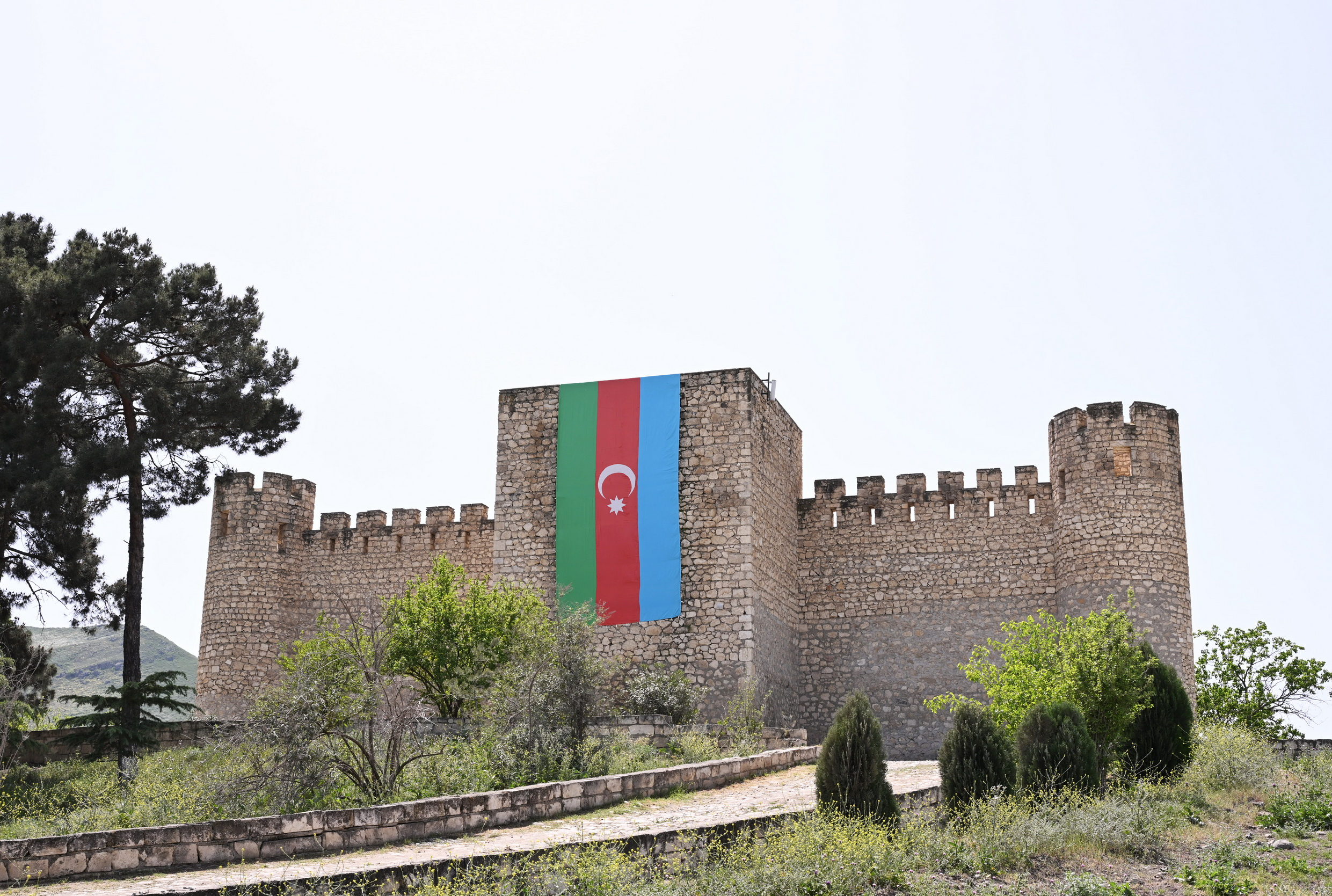

Site information
- Type: Castle

Location
- Coordinates: 40.0655°N 46.9061°E

Site history
- Built: 1752
- Built by: Panah Ali Khan
- Materials: Limestone and dimension stone

Shahbulag Castle (Azerbaijani: Şahbulaq qalası, Persian: قلعه شاهبولاگ; literally "Spring of the Shah") is an 18th-century fortress near Aghdam in Azerbaijan, built by the Karabakh Khan Panah Ali.

== Name and Etymology ==
The castle was named Shahbulag ('Shah's spring', also Shah-Bulaghi) after a nearby spring bearing the same name located around the lower part of the Khachinchay (Khachen) River. Before the construction of the castle, the area around it was known as Tarnagyut, which, according to Armenian archaeologist Hamlet Petrosyan, is a corruption of Tigranakert, the ruined ancient city which lies nearby the castle. Some historians in the late 18th and 19th centuries still called the castle "Tarnakut" or "Tarnavut", such as Abd al-Razzaq Beg Donboli (died 1827/28) and Abbasgulu Bakikhanov (died 1847).

== History ==
Following the assassination of the Iranian shah (king) Nader Shah (r. 1736–1747) in 1747, internal chaos erupted in Iran, particularly in the South Caucasus, where semi-autonomous khanates emerged as a result of the lack of a centralized government. Amongst them was the Karabakh Khanate, established by Panah Ali Khan of the Javanshir tribe. Before Panah Ali Khan had Shahbulag Castle constructed, he fought and defeated the inhabitants of the Melikdom of Khachen, as they were hostile towards him and lived near the area that Shahbulag would be constructed. In 1752, the construction of Shahbulag Castle was complete at the base of a mountain in Tarnavut district. Panah Ali Khan relocated everyone from Bayat Castle to Shahbulag, which brought him within close proximity of the highlands ruled by the five Armenian melikdoms. Following the construction of Panahabad fortress in Shusha, Panah Ali Khan relocated the notables, dignitaries, and tribal leaders there.

In May 1805, Panah Ali Khan's son and successor Ibrahim Khalil Khan signed the Treaty of Kurekchay, which granted Russia full authority over Karabakh's external affairs in exchange for a yearly payment. On July 6, an Iranian force defeated a Russian force at Shahbulag, subsequently taking control over the castle.

=== Castle ===
The complex, which included mosques, houses, baths and a market, was built in 1751–52. During construction, limestone and dimension stone were used. Only the castle itself and the mosque on its northwestern end have survived. The castle has a rectangular architectural design, and its external walls are reinforced with circular and semicylinder towers. The walls and towers contain embrasures and merlons typical for defence structures. The castle walls are 7 metres (23 ft) high, and the towers are 8.5 metres (28 ft) high. The entrance to the castle is in the middle section of the eastern wall. During the reign of the khan, it was protected by two-story tower-like premises. The top floor was intended for the khan, with a stone staircase leading to it from the castle yard. The castle was built from half-hewn whole stones.

=== Mosque ===
The mosque built during the construction of Shahbulag Castle is on the northwestern part of the castle. It includes a small stone prayer hall with a square dome 5.1 metres (17 ft) on one side and a veranda with a facade of 5.1 by 2.5 metres (16.7 by 8.2 ft) that faces east. The veranda beams are based on quadrangular 8-edge pillars. The architecture of Shahbulag is thought to have influenced later architectural designs of buildings in the entire Karabakh region, and especially that of Shusha.

== Current state ==
Today, Shahbulag Castle remains an important historic and cultural remnant of the Karabakh Khanate period. The castle was renovated in early 1980s by Azerbaijan SSR. During the First Nagorno-Karabakh war, the castle and its surroundings were captured by Armenian forces following the Battle of Aghdam. When the castle was under Armenian control, a small museum was operated there, storing artifacts found during excavations at the adjacent archaeological site of Tigranakert.

The castle and the Aghdam District were returned to Azerbaijan on 20 November 2020 per the ceasefire agreement that ended the 2020 Nagorno-Karabakh war. The artifacts from Tigranakert kept at Shahbulag were removed before the area was returned to Azerbaijani control.

== Gallery ==
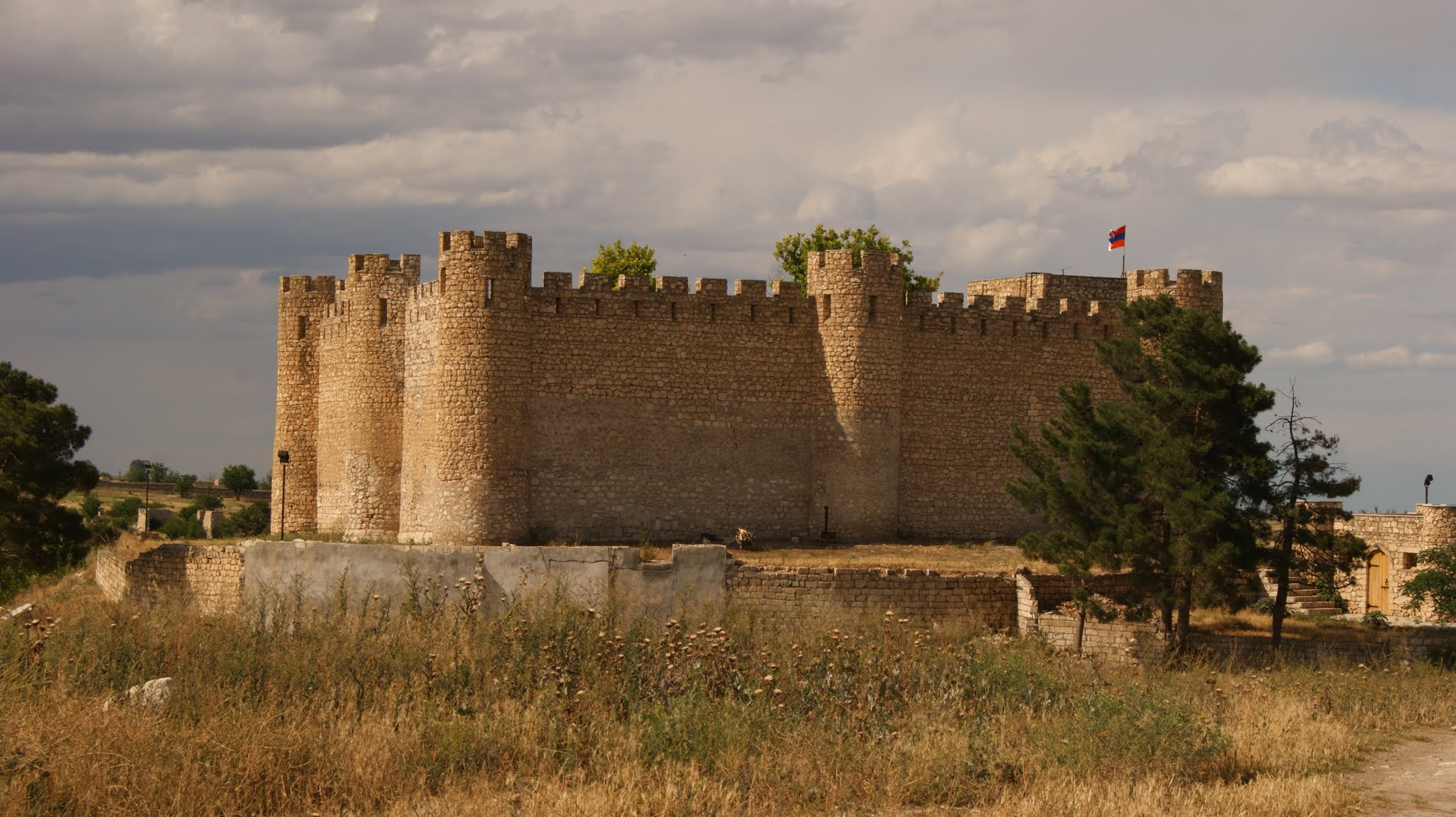

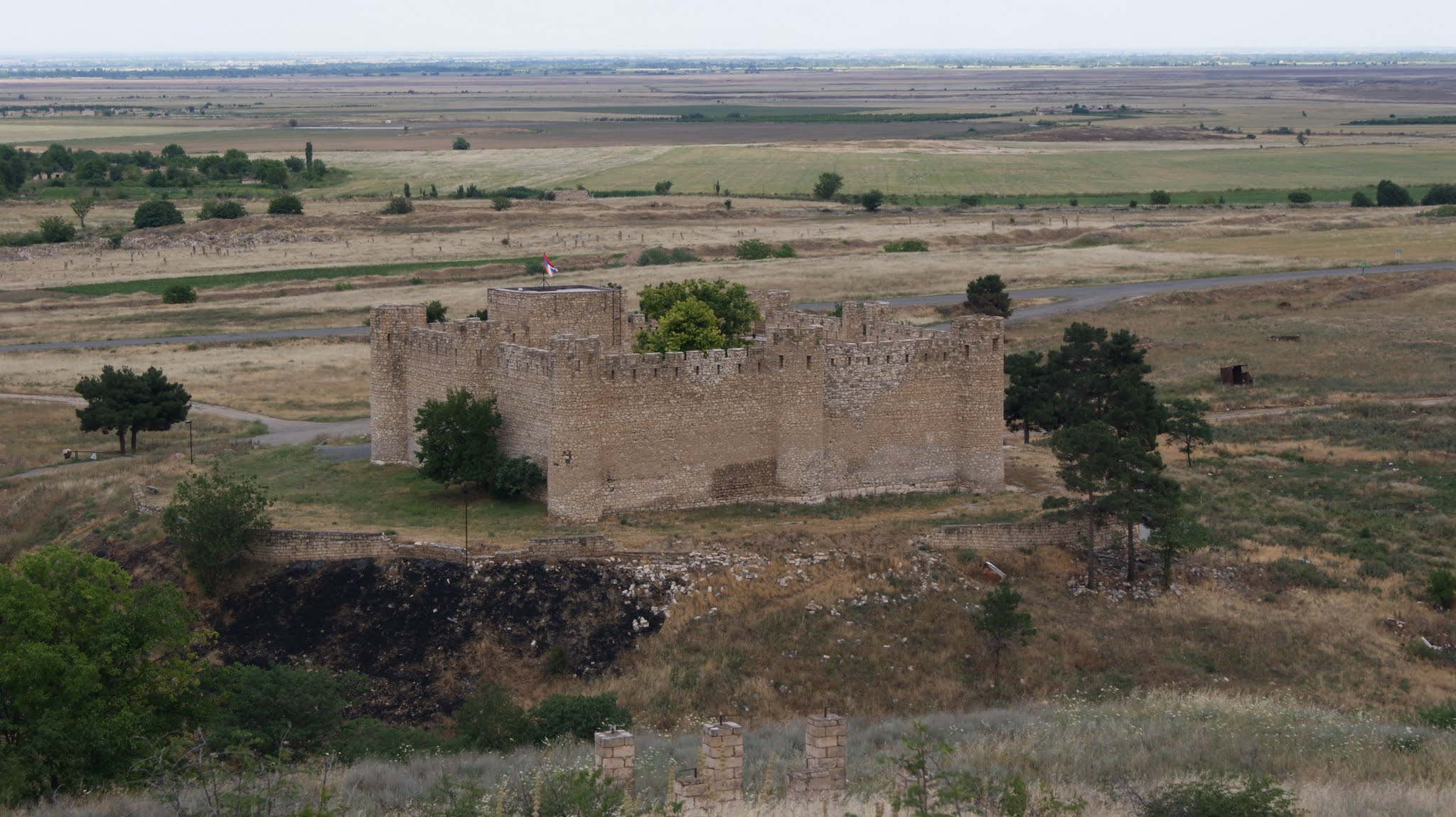

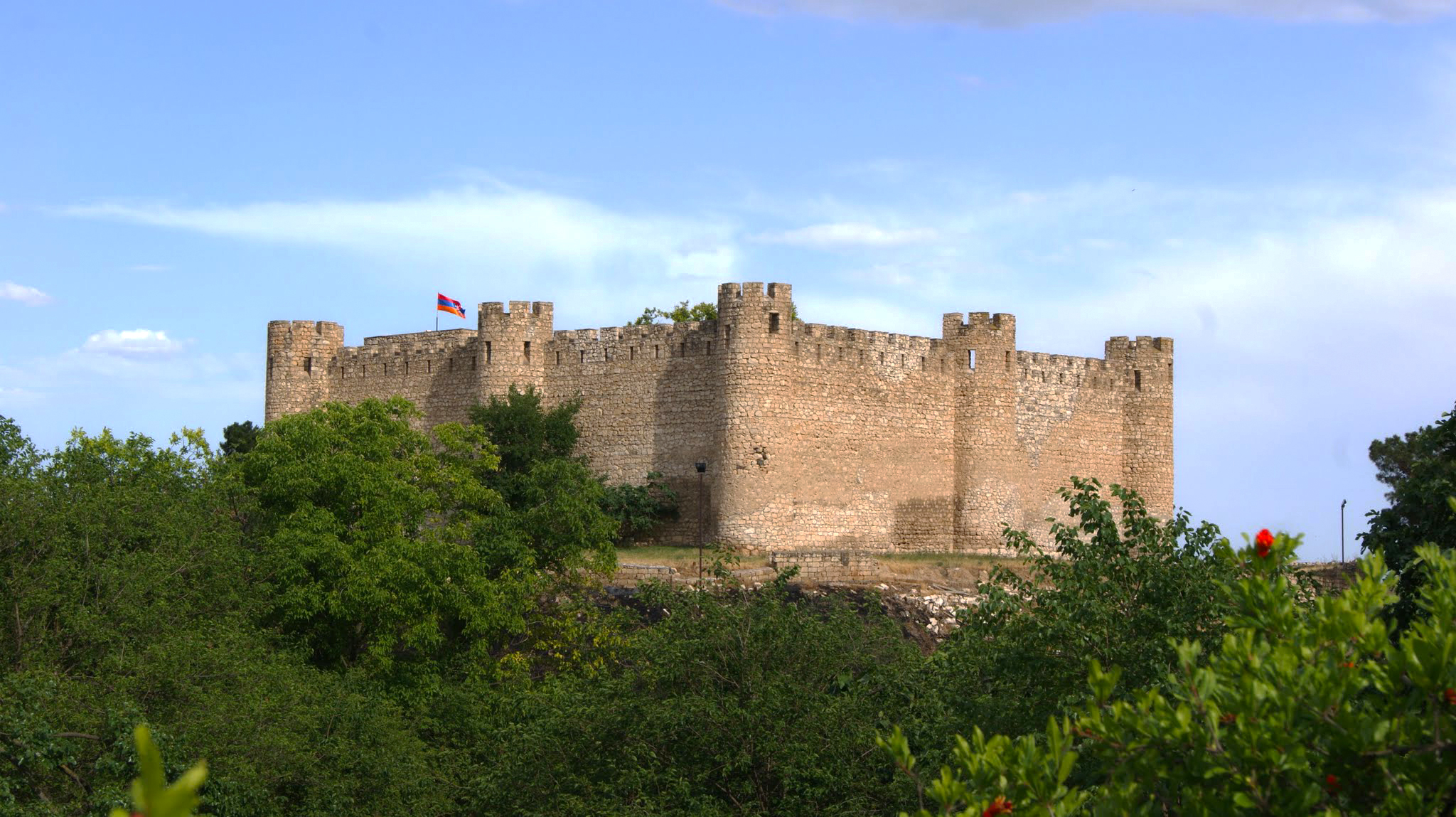

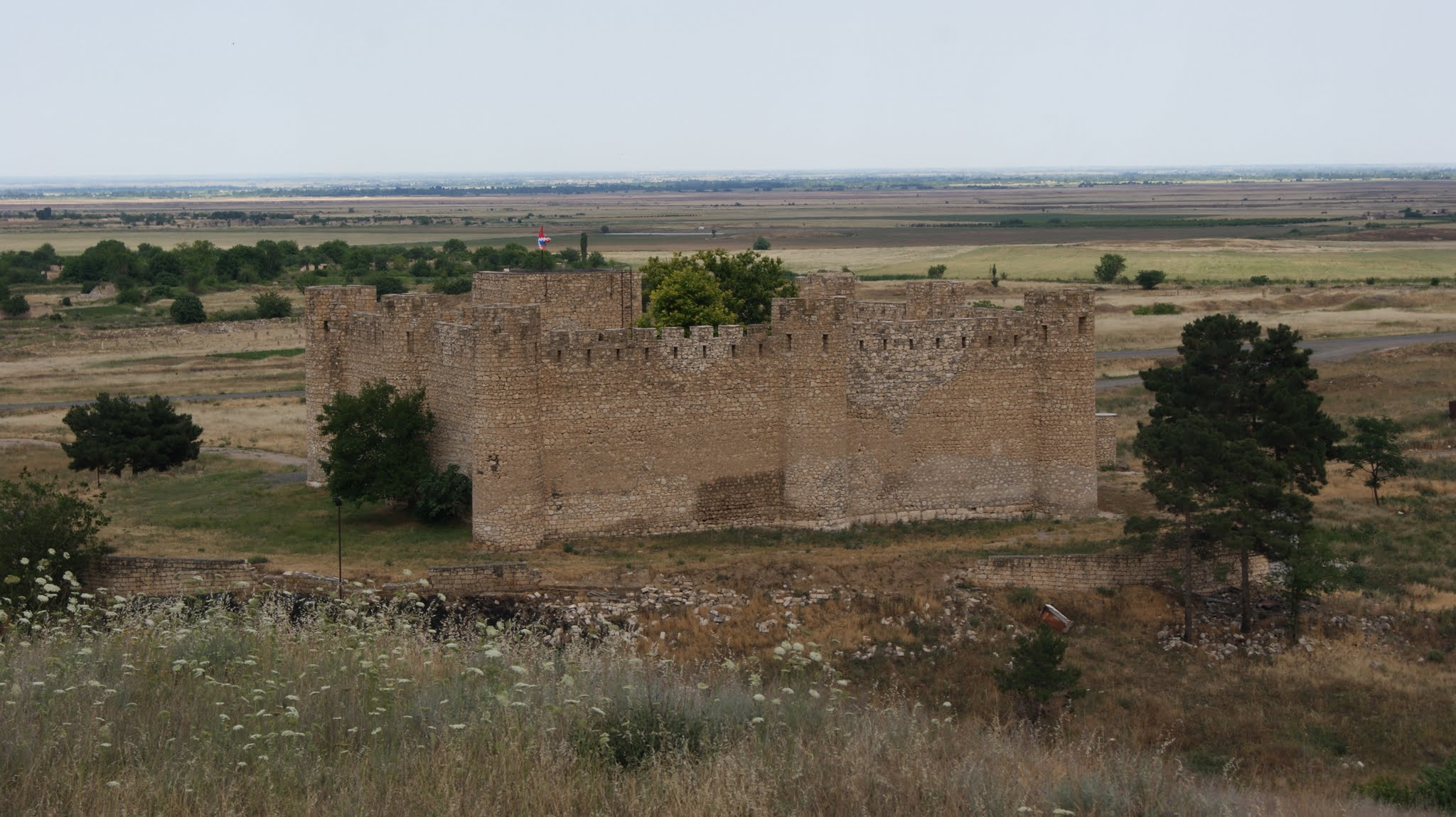

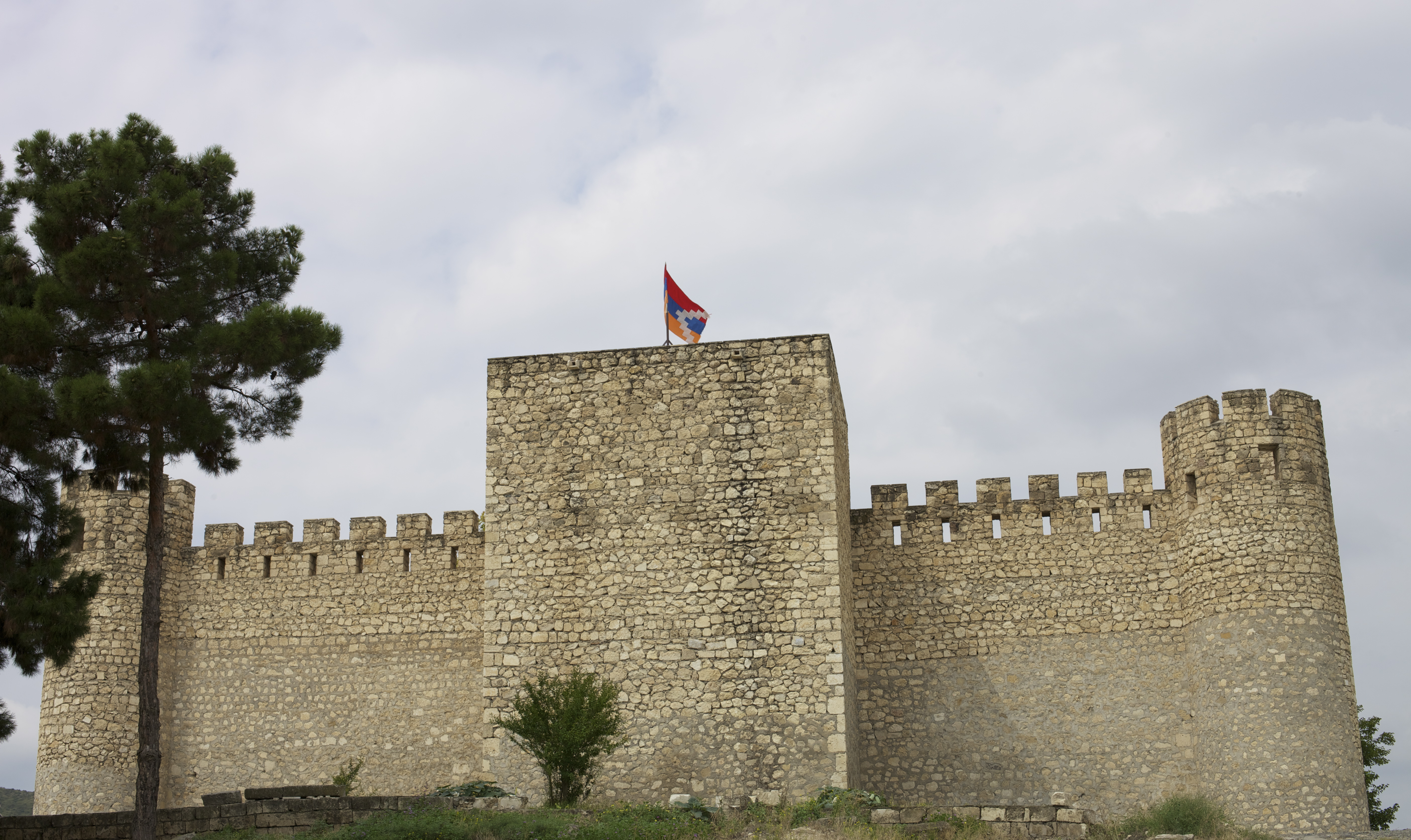

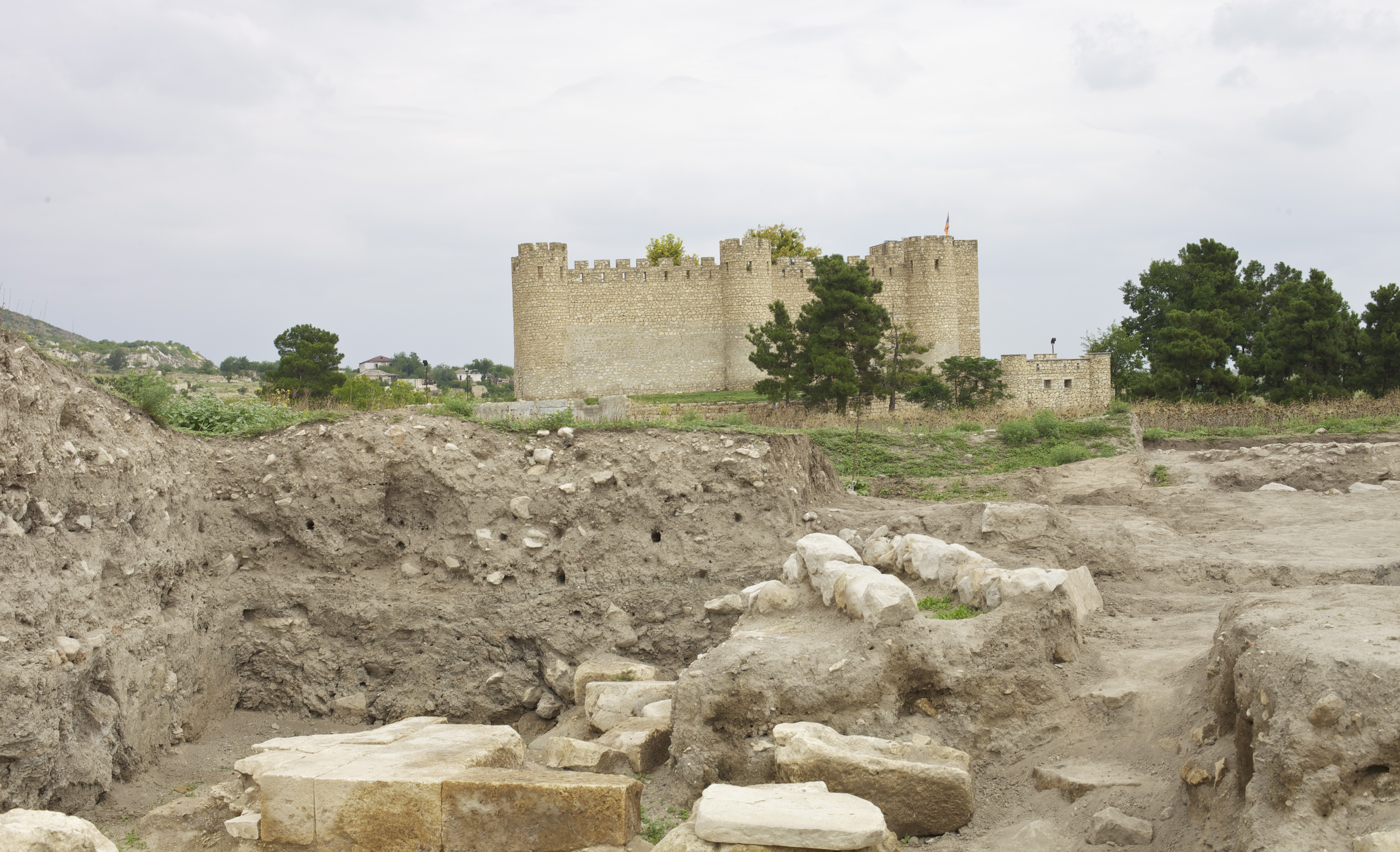

== See also ==
- Bayat Castle
- Lekh Castle

== Sources ==
- Behrooz, Maziar (2023). Iran at War: Interactions with the Modern World and the Struggle with Imperial Russia. I.B. Tauris. ISBN 978-0-7556-3737-9.
- Bournoutian, George (1994). A History of Qarabagh: An Annotated Translation of Mirza Jamal Javanshir Qarabaghi's Tarikh-e Qarabagh. Mazda Publishers. ISBN 978-1-56859-011-0.
- Bournoutian, George (2016). "Prelude to War: The Russian Siege and Storming of the Fortress of Ganjeh, 1803–4". Iranian Studies. 50 (1). Taylor & Francis: 107–124. doi:10.1080/00210862.2016.1159779. S2CID 163302882.
- Bournoutian, George (2021). From the Kur to the Aras: A Military History of Russia's Move into the South Caucasus and the First Russo-Iranian War, 1801–1813. Brill. ISBN 978-90-04-44515-4.
- Davud, Seyyed Ali Al-i (2021). "Ibrāhīm Khalīl Khān Jawānshī". In Fleet, Kate; Krämer, Gudrun; Matringe, Denis; Nawas, John; Rowson, Everett (eds.). Encyclopaedia of Islam (3rd ed.). Brill Online. doi:10.1163/1573-3912_ei3_COM_30552. ISSN 1873-9830.
- Petrosyan, Hamlet L. (2010). "Tigranakert in Artsakh". Tigranes the Great. Yerevan: Union of World Armenian Painters. pp. 380–387. ISBN 978-99941-2-471-8.
