= Bayat Castle =

Castle in Tartar District, Azerbaijan

- Bayat qalası قلعه بیات
- Part of Karabakh Khanate
- Tartar District, Azerbaijan

Site information
- Type: Castle

Location
- Coordinates: 40.27°N 47.01°E

Site history
- Built: 1748
- Built by: Panah Ali Khan
- Materials: hard burned bricks

Bayat Castle (Azerbaijani: Bayat qalası, Persian: قلعه بیات) is in the Kebirli village of the Tartar District of Azerbaijan.

== History ==
After the death of Iranian ruler Nader Shah (r. 1736-1747), several khanates were established on the territory that constitutes the present-day Republic of Azerbaijan and Armenia. One of these was the Karabakh Khanate founded by Panah Ali Khan Javanshir. The first capital of the khanate was the Bayat Castle built in 1748 in Kebirli mahali (province). The castle was named after the Turkic Bayat clan. It included all strategic defense structures such as walls warfare trenches and had a market, bath house and a mosque. It was built with hard burned bricks. When the construction of the castle was finalized Panah Ali Khan moved all of his court to the castle.

The capital was therefore soon moved to the newly constructed Shahbulag Castle located in lowland Karabakh in 1752. Eventually, with an intent to secure the entity from external threats, especially from Iran, Panah Ali Khan moved the capital to its final location, Shusha, a more reliable natural fortress located on a hardly penetratable mountain rock.

== Current state ==
Bayat castle is among the most valuable historic and cultural monuments of Azerbaijan. It is one of the monuments that partially survived after more than two centuries

== See also ==
- Shahbulag Castle
- Shusha
- Shusha State Historical and Architectural Reserve
