= Tigranakert of Artsakh =

Archaeological site in Azerbaijan

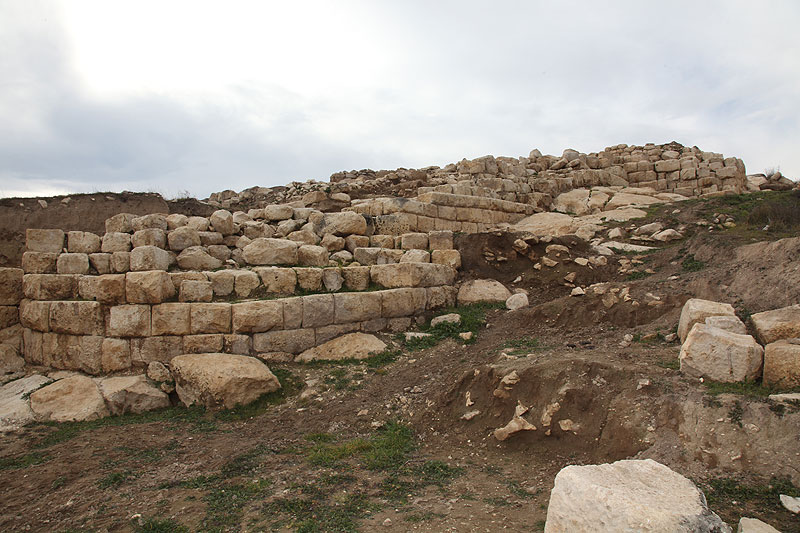
- Fragment of Tigranakert's city wall

- Location within Azerbaijan
- 40°03′55″N 46°54′21″E
- Location: Aghdam District, Azerbaijan

History
- Built: 2nd–1st century B.C.
- Built by: Tigranes the Great or Tigranes I

Site notes
- Excavation dates: 2005–2020

Tigranakert (Armenian: Արցախի Տիգրանակերտ, Arts'akhi Tigranakert), also known as Tigranakert-Artsakh, is a ruined Armenian city dating back to the Hellenistic period, located in the Aghdam District of what is today Azerbaijan.

It is one of several former cities in the Armenian plateau with the same name, named in honor of the Armenian king Tigranes the Great (r. 95–55 B.C.), with the name Artsakh referring to the historical province of Artsakh in the ancient Kingdom of Armenia. However, some scholars, such as Robert Hewsen and Babken Harutyunyan, have posited that this particular Tigranakert may have been founded by Tigranes the Great's father, Tigranes I (r. ca. 123–95 B.C.). It occupies an area of about 50 hectares and is located approximately four kilometers south of the Khachinchay (Khachen) River.

The site was within territory that came under the occupation of Armenian forces after the First Nagorno-Karabakh war and was made part of the self-proclaimed Republic of Artsakh until November 2020 when it was handed over to Azerbaijan as part of the 2020 Nagorno-Karabakh ceasefire agreement. In November 2021, Armenian sources reported that Azerbaijanis have turned a section of Tigranakert into a barbecue restaurant.

== History ==
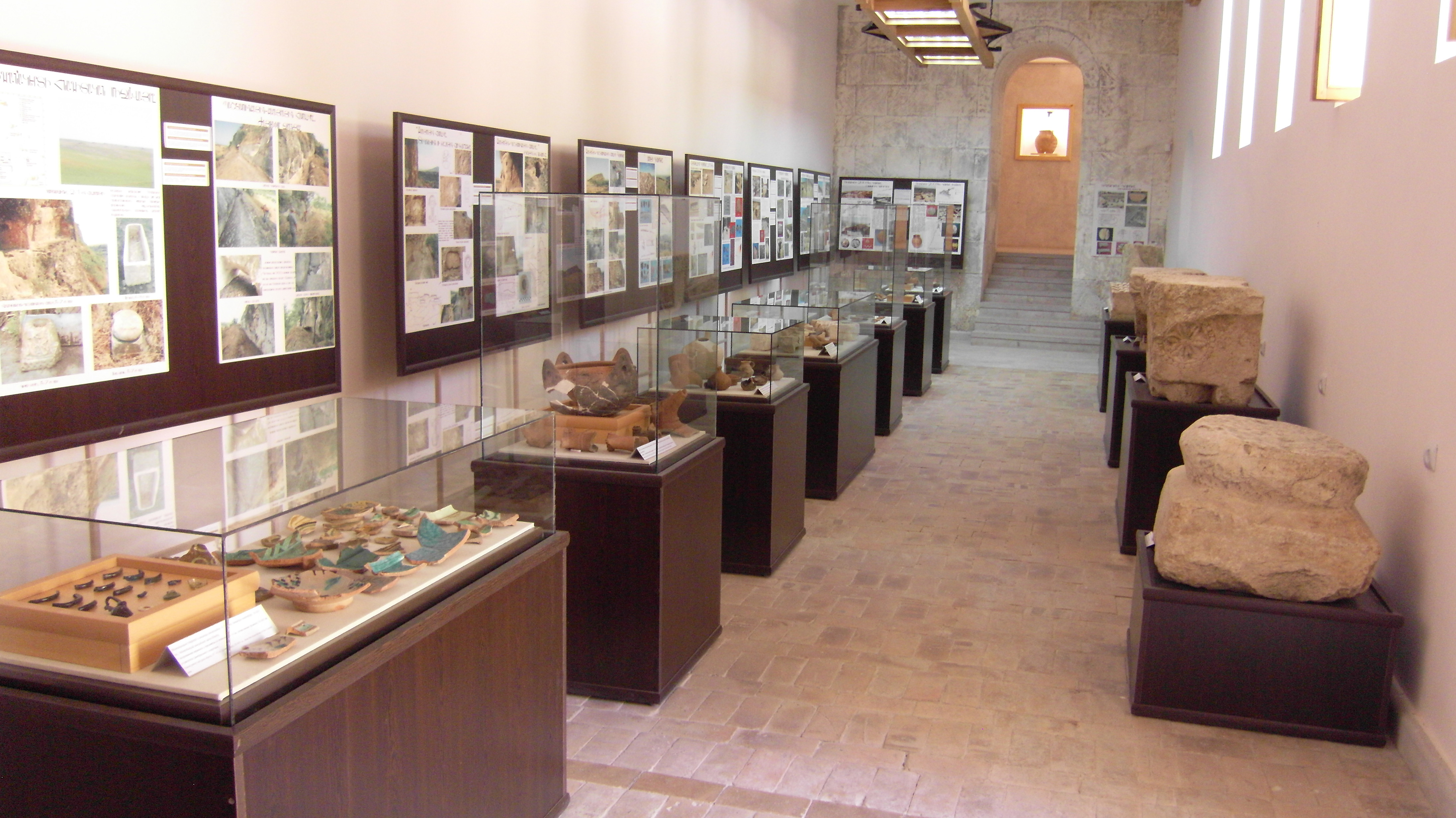
Exhibition hall at the Tigranakert Museum

Primary sources first make mention of Tigranakert in the seventh century, stating that there were actually two such cities with the same name in the province of Utik. Archaeologists and historians have managed to date the founding of the first one to the 120s–80s B.C., during the reign of either King Tigranes I, or his son and successor King Tigranes the Great. Robert Hewsen has questioned the attribution to Tigranes II, as no coins or inscriptions bearing his name have been uncovered yet and the identification of the remains rests on the local name for the site. The ruins of the second Tigranakert have yet to be uncovered, although it is believed to have been located in the district of Gardman. Tigranakert was the site of a battle in the spring of 625 AD, between the Byzantine emperor Heraclius (r. 610–641) and a Sasanian force, which resulted in the defeat of the latter. The site has inscriptions in both Armenian and Greek dating back to the 5th and 7th centuries.

After the demise of the first Tigranakert in the early Middle Ages, the name of the city was preserved and used continuously in local geographic lore as Tngrnakert, Tarnakert, Taraniurt, Tarnagiurt, and Tetrakerte. In the 1740s–50s, Shahbulag Castle was built on the site of Tigranakert by the Turkic warlord Panah Ali. It was de facto under the control of the self-proclaimed Republic of Artsakh as part of its Askeran Province until being handed over to Azerbaijan, along with the rest of the Aghdam District as a part of the 2020 Nagorno-Karabakh ceasefire agreement. According to Hamlet Petrosyan, an Armenian archeologist and historian who headed the archeological expedition at Tigranakert, Azerbaijan shelled Tigranakert several times during the 2020 Nagorno-Karabakh war. In January 2024, it was reported that a facility resembling an internment camp had been built in the immediate vicinity of the archaeological site.

== Excavations ==
Excavations at Tigranakert began in March 2005, when it was first discovered, and until 2020 were ongoing under the directorship of Dr. Hamlet L. Petrosyan of the Armenian Academy of Sciences' Institute of Archaeology and Ethnography. Archaeologists have uncovered two of the main walls of the city, as well as Hellenistic-style towers and an Armenian basilica church dating to the fifth to seventh centuries. In 2008, the excavation team began to face funding issues, although the authorities of the Republic of Artsakh promised to allocate 30 million drams to continue further research. During the excavations of 2008–2010, silver coins of the Parthian monarchs Mithridates IV (r. 57–54 BC) and Orodes II (r. 57–37 BC) were found.

In June 2010, a museum dedicated to the study and preservation of artefacts unearthed from Tigranakert was opened in the adjacent Shahbulag Castle. Some of the artefacts from Tigranakert were removed from the area by Armenian workers before the handover of the Aghdam District to Azerbaijan.

== Gallery ==
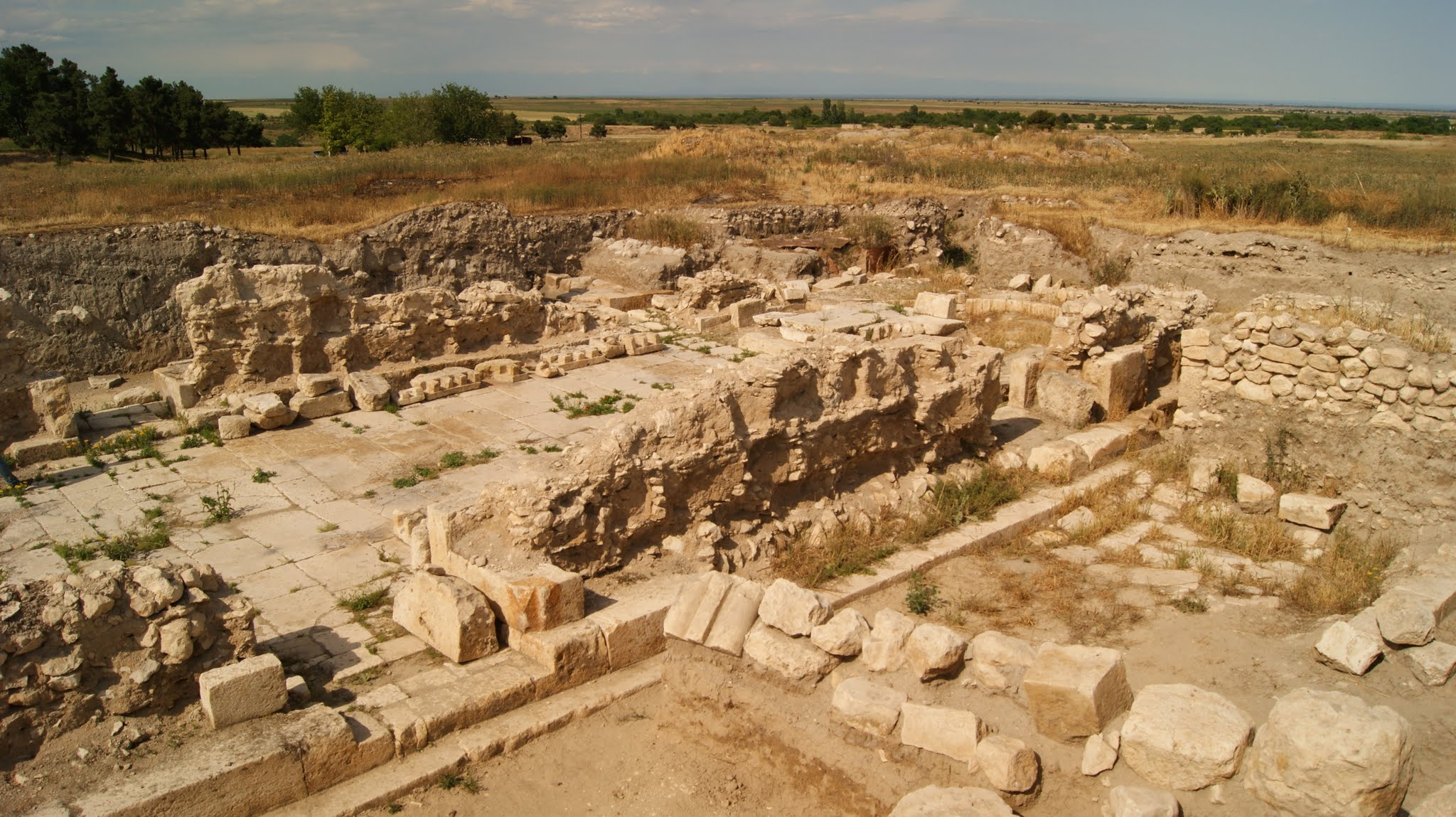

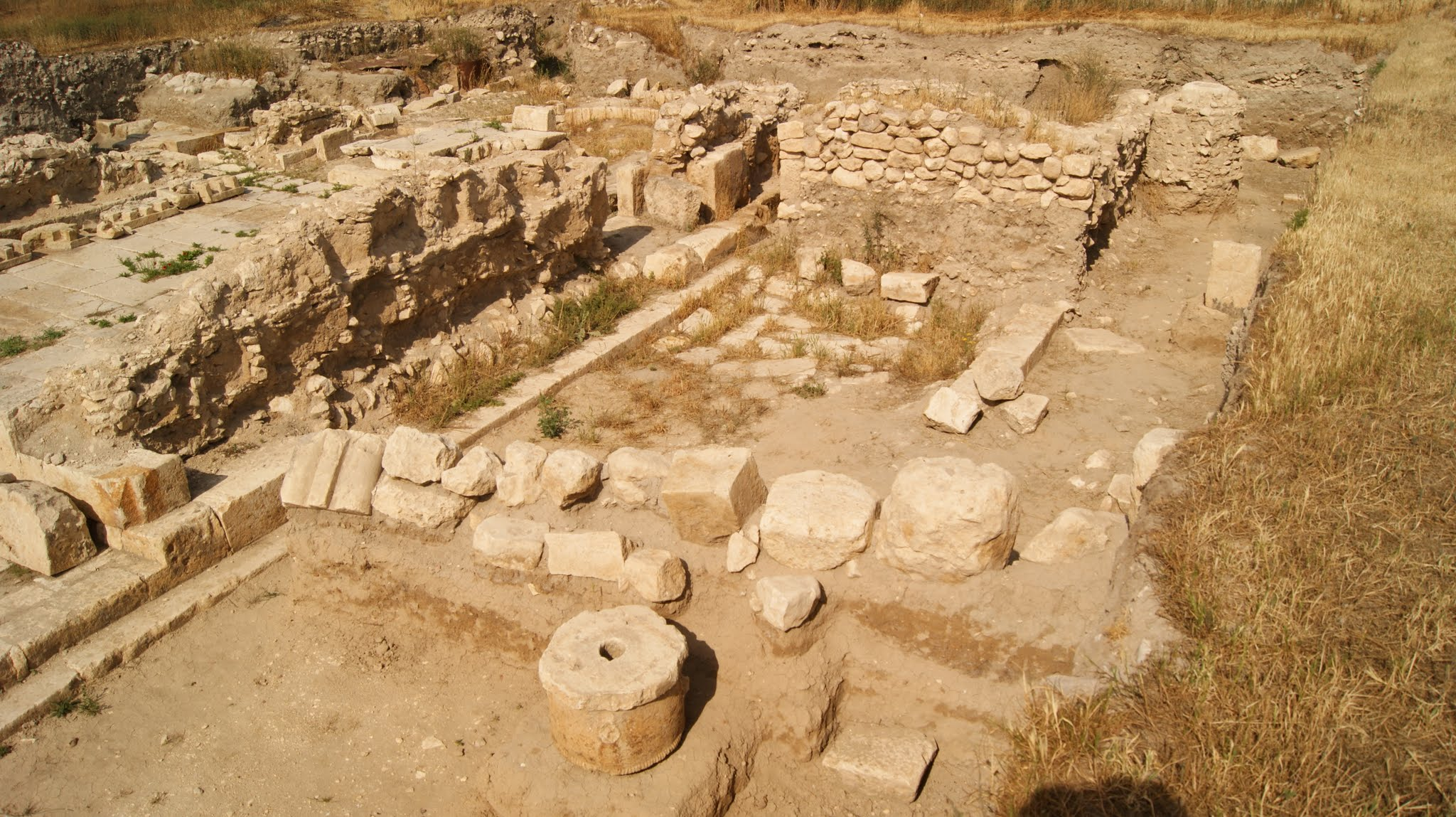

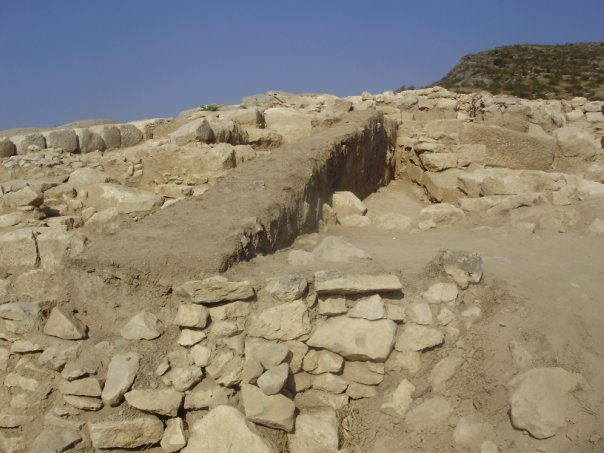
Part of the city defense wall

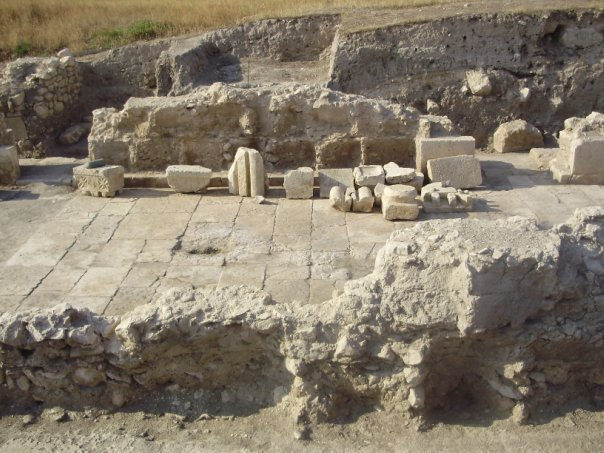
So-called Lower Borough of the city of Tigranakert

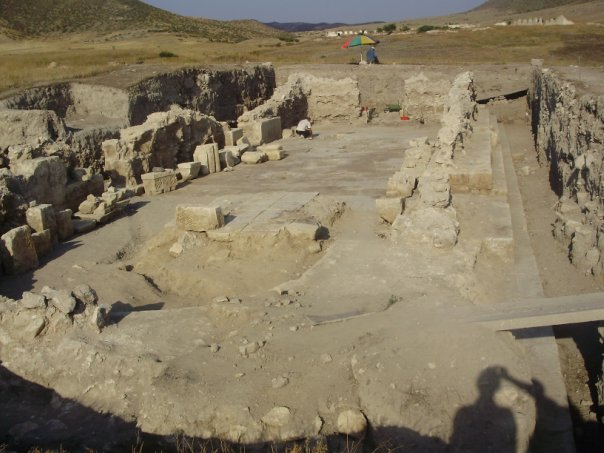
Part of the Lower Borough

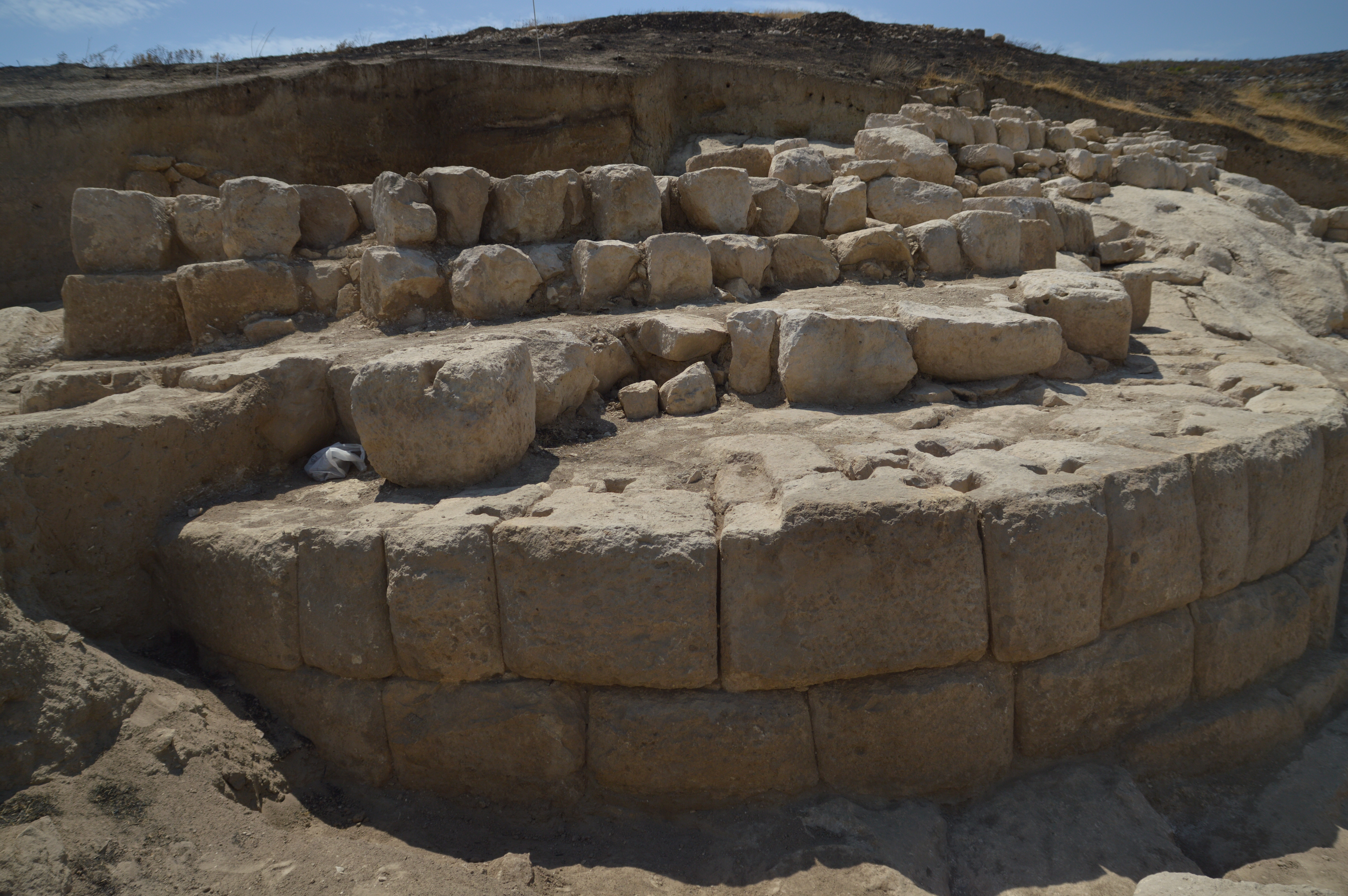
Tigranakert city walls

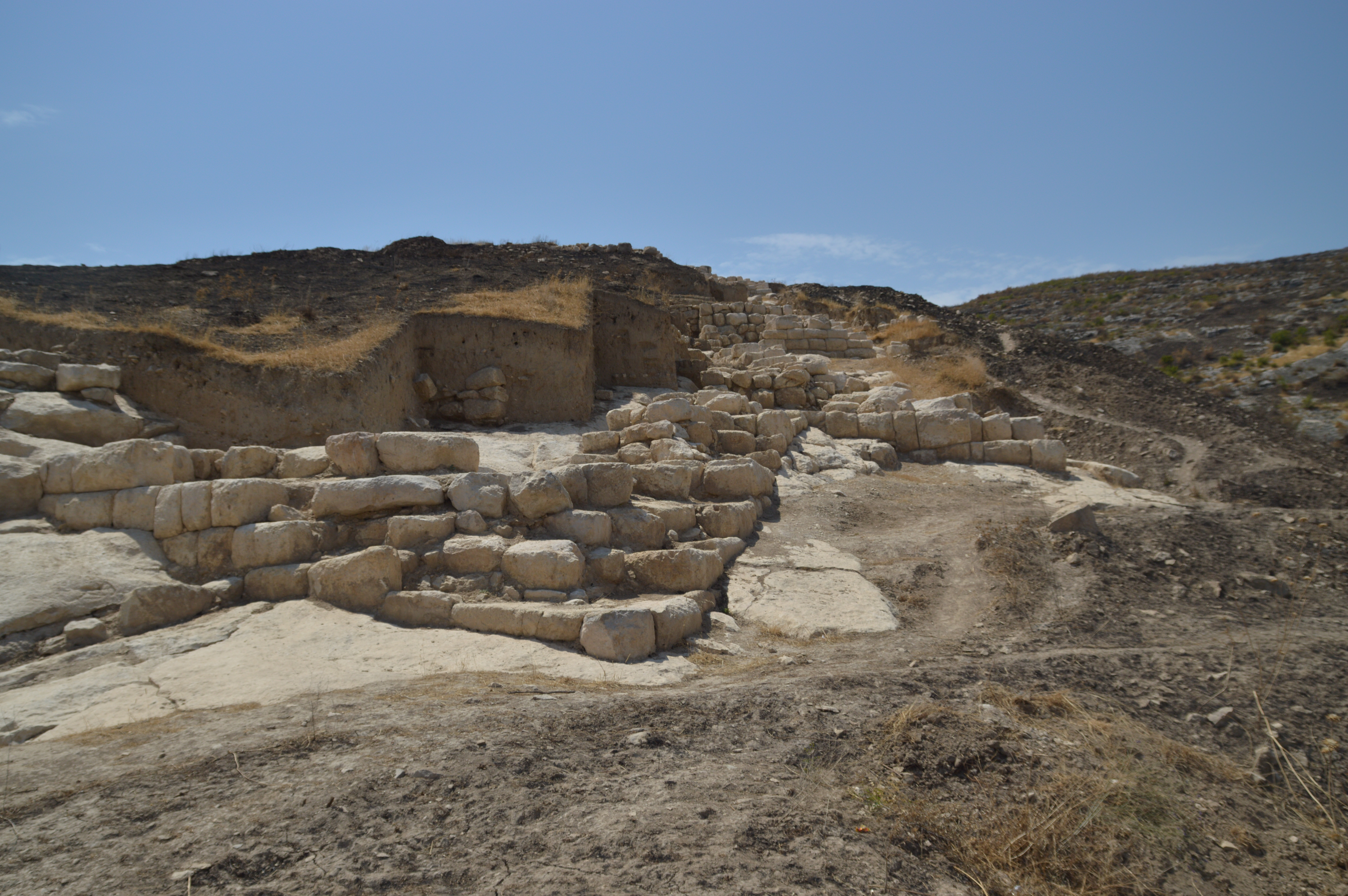
Tigranakert city walls

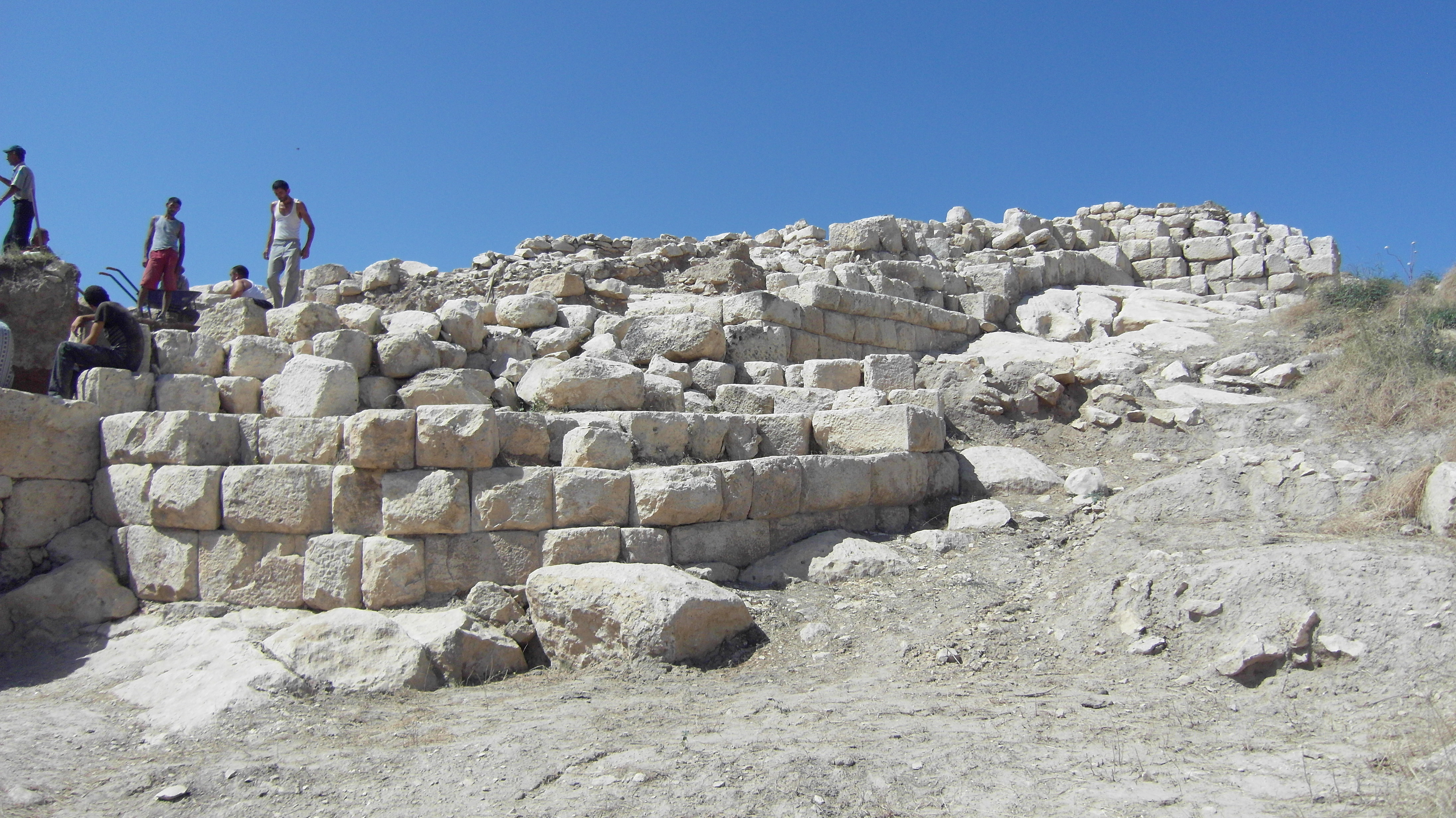
Tigranakert citadel

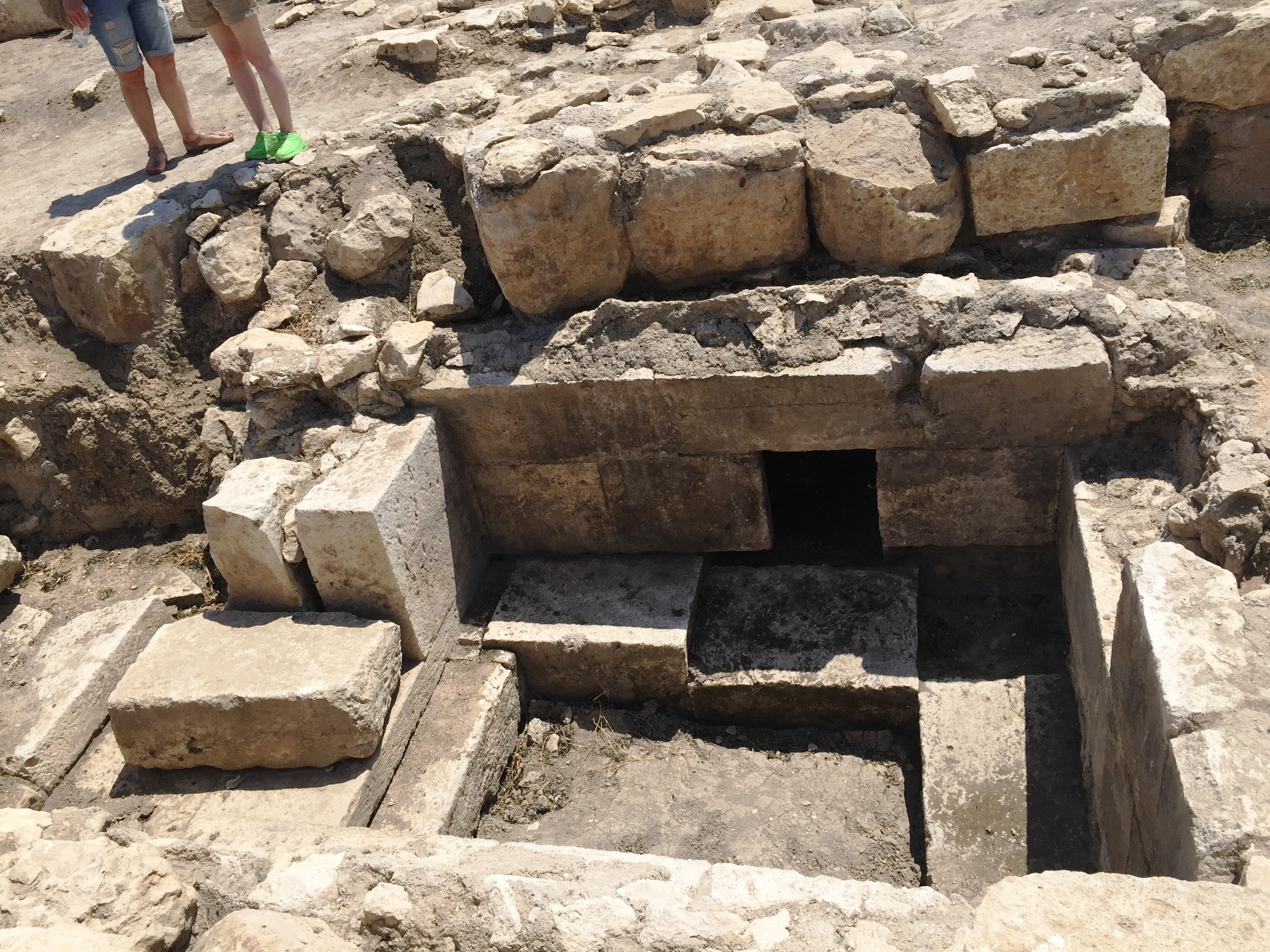

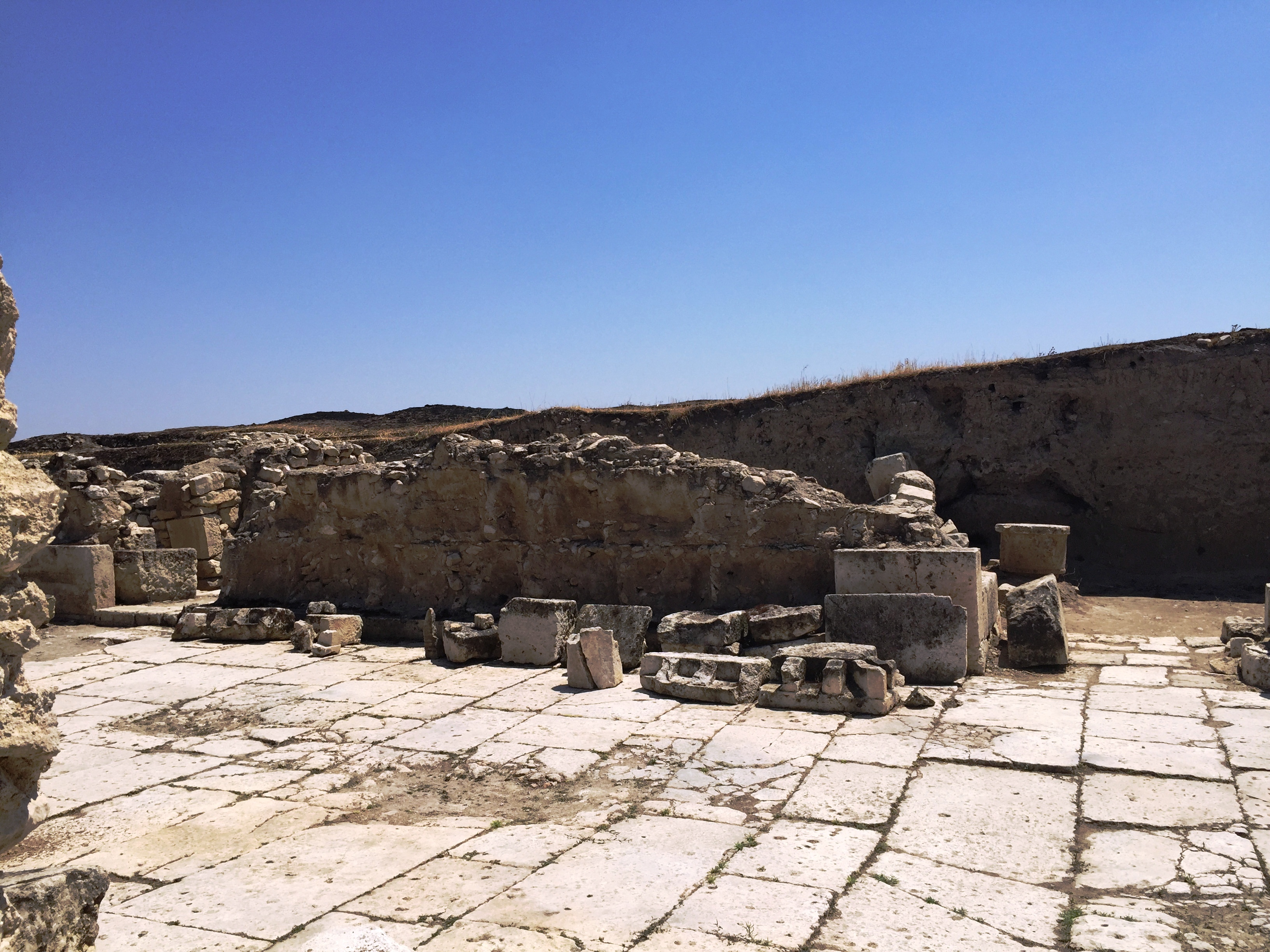

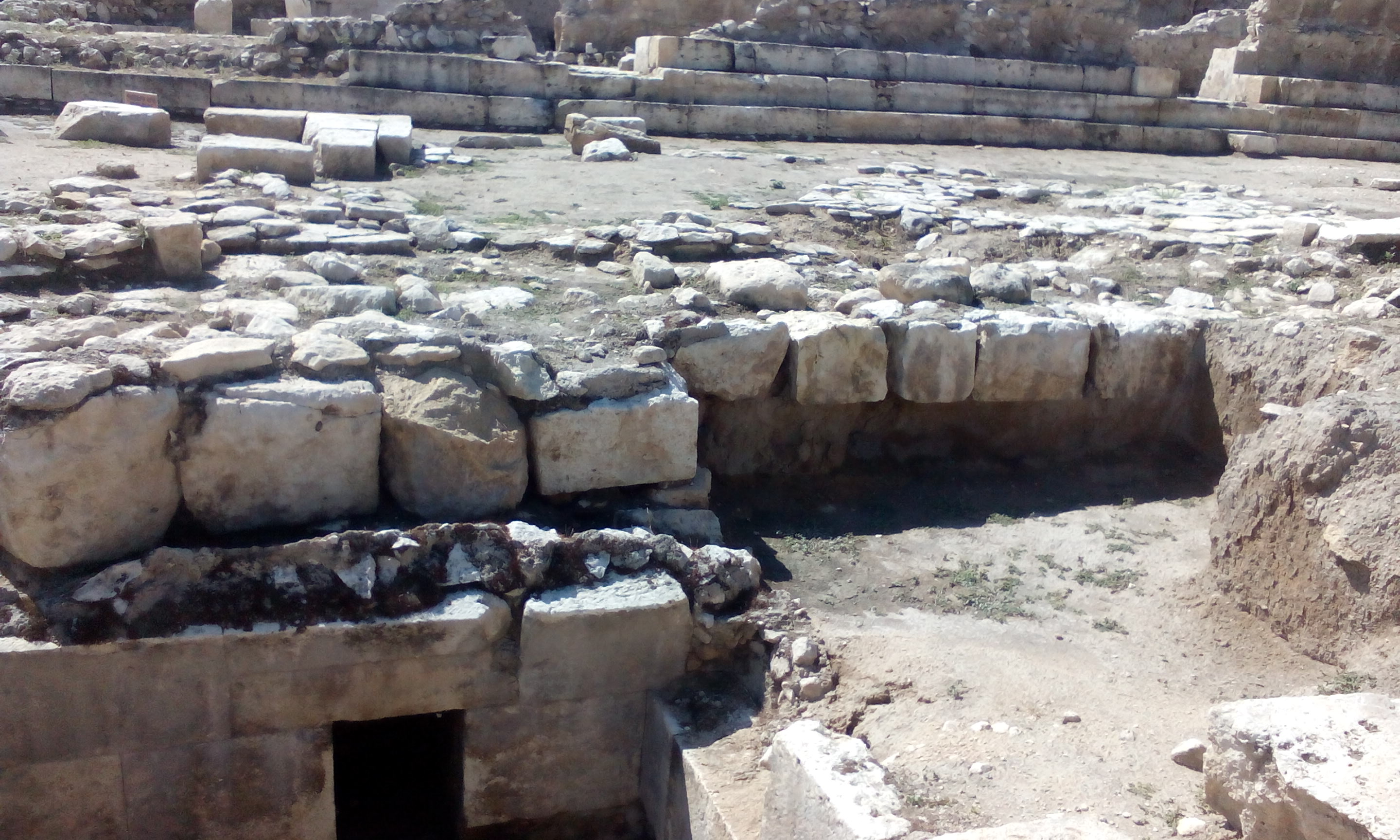

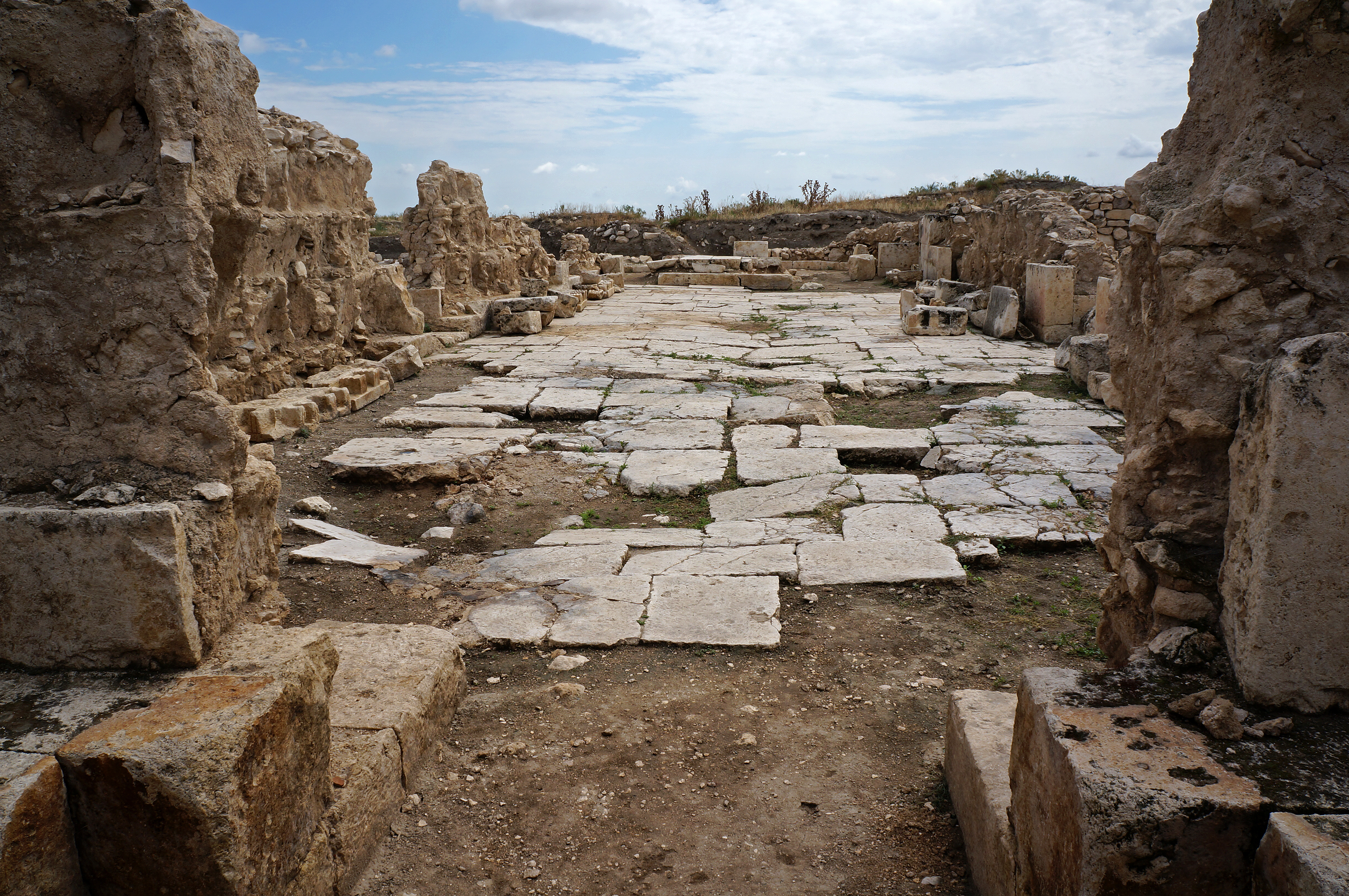

== See also ==
- Tigranocerta
- Tigranakert (Nakhijevan)
- Tigranes the Great

== Sources ==
- Canepa, Matthew P. (2018). "Rival Visions and New Royal Identities in Post-Achaemenid Anatolia and the Caucasus". The Iranian Expanse: Transforming Royal Identity through Architecture, Landscape, and the Built Environment, 550 BCE–642 CE. University of California Press. pp. 95–121. ISBN 9780520964365.
- Petrosyan, Hamlet L. (2010). "Tigranakert in Artsakh". Yerevan: 380–387.
