= Hamlet Petrosyan =

Armenian historian and archaeologist

Hamlet Petrosyan (Armenian: Համլետ Պետրոսյան; born 1955) is an Armenian historian, archaeologist, and anthropologist.

== Biography ==
Petrosyan was born in 1955 in the village of Khnatsakh in what was then Askeran district of the Nagorno-Karabakh Autonomous Oblast. He graduated from the Department of Archaeology of Yerevan State University (YSU) and completed his post-graduate studies at the Institute of Archaeology and Ethnography of the Academy of Sciences of Armenian SSR.

Petrosyan started his career at Armenia's State Museum of Ethnography as chief of the Paleoanthropology Department. Since 1981, he has been a senior research fellow at the Institute of Archaeology and Ethnography of Armenia's Academy of Sciences. Petrosyan was a visiting professor on archaeology and anthropology at his alma mater, YSU, between 1992 and 2006. In 2007 he was named Chair of Cultural Studies at YSU.

Petrosyan has led excavations in Shushi, Handaberd, and most notably, the ancient site of Tigranakert in Artsakh. He has described Tigranakert as “the best-preserved city of the Hellenistic and Armenian civilizations.”

== Publications ==
Patrosyan's English publications include:

- Petrosyan H., Kalantaryan A., Karakhanyan G., Melkonyan H., Armenia in the Cultural Context of East and West. Ceramics and Glass (4th - 14th centuries), Yerevan, 2009
- Petrosyan H., Khachkar: the Origin, Functions, Iconography and Semantics, 2010
- H. L. Petrosyan, N. Sweezy, Armenian Folk Arts, Culture and Identity, Bloomington and Indianapolis, Indiana Univ. Press, 2001, p. 3-22
