= Kyabirli, Aghjabadi =

Kəbirli
- Municipality
- Location within Azerbaijan Location within Karabakh Economic Region
- Coordinates: 40°02′06″N 47°16′08″E
- Country: Azerbaijan
- Rayon: Aghjabadi

Population
  - Total: 1,985
- Time zone: UTC+4 (AZT)
  - Summer (DST): UTC+5 (AZT)

Kəbirli (also known as Kyabirli and Kebirli) is a village and municipality in the Aghjabadi Rayon of Azerbaijan. It has a population of 1,985.
