= Khnatsakh, Nagorno-Karabakh =

Khnatsakh / Khanyurdu Խնածախ / Xanyurdu
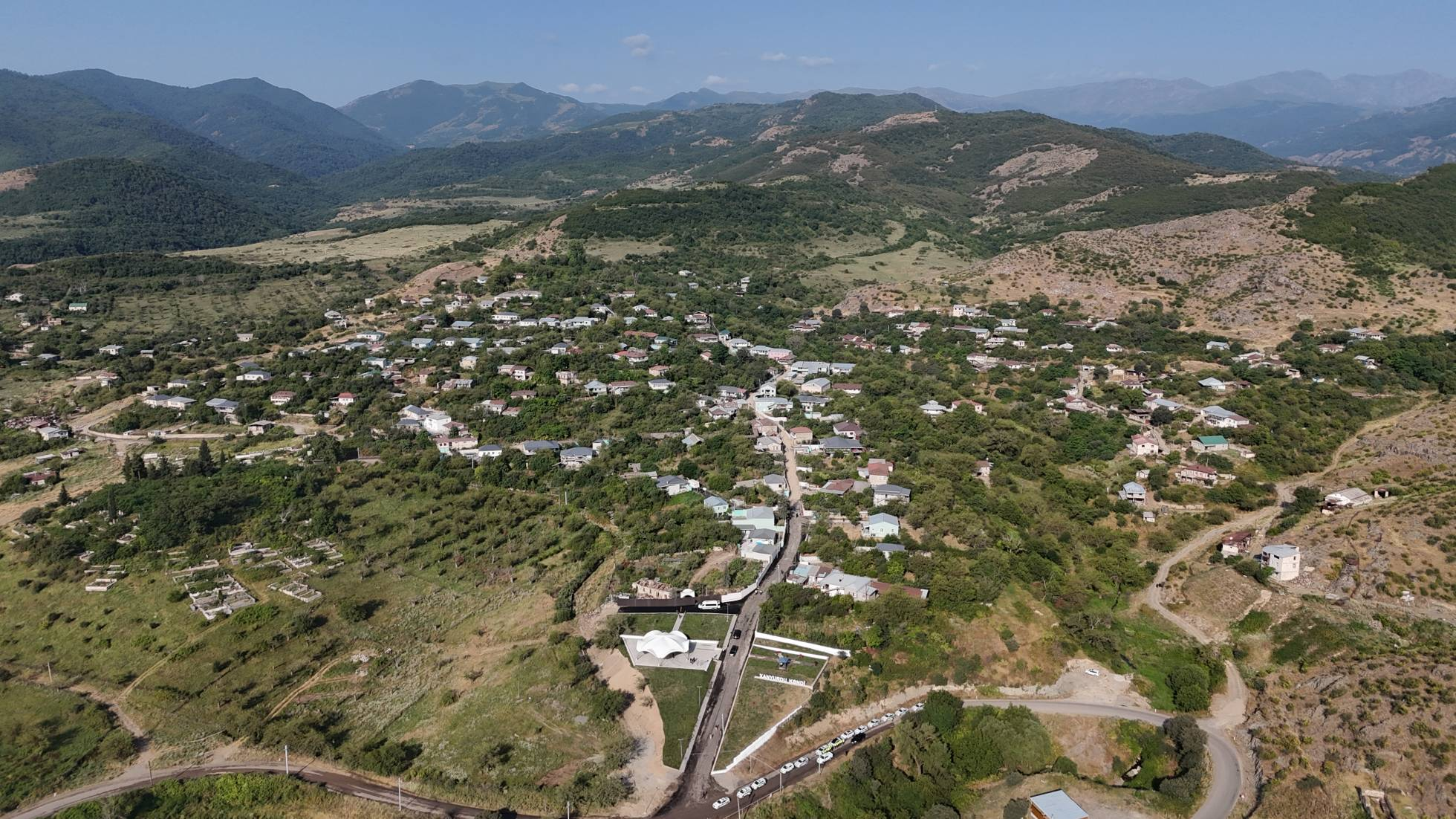

- Location within Azerbaijan Location within Karabakh Economic Region
- Coordinates: 39°50′49″N 46°44′20″E
- Country: Azerbaijan
  - District: Khojaly

Population (2015)
  - Total: 684
- Time zone: UTC+4 (AZT)

Khnatsakh (Armenian: Խնածախ) or Khanyurdu (Azerbaijani: Xanyurdu) is a village in the Khojaly District of Azerbaijan, in the region of Nagorno-Karabakh. Until 2023 it was controlled by the breakaway Republic of Artsakh. The village had an ethnic Armenian-majority population until the expulsion of the Armenian population of Nagorno-Karabakh by Azerbaijan following the 2023 Azerbaijani offensive in Nagorno-Karabakh. The village is located to the immediate north of the city of Stepanakert.

== History ==
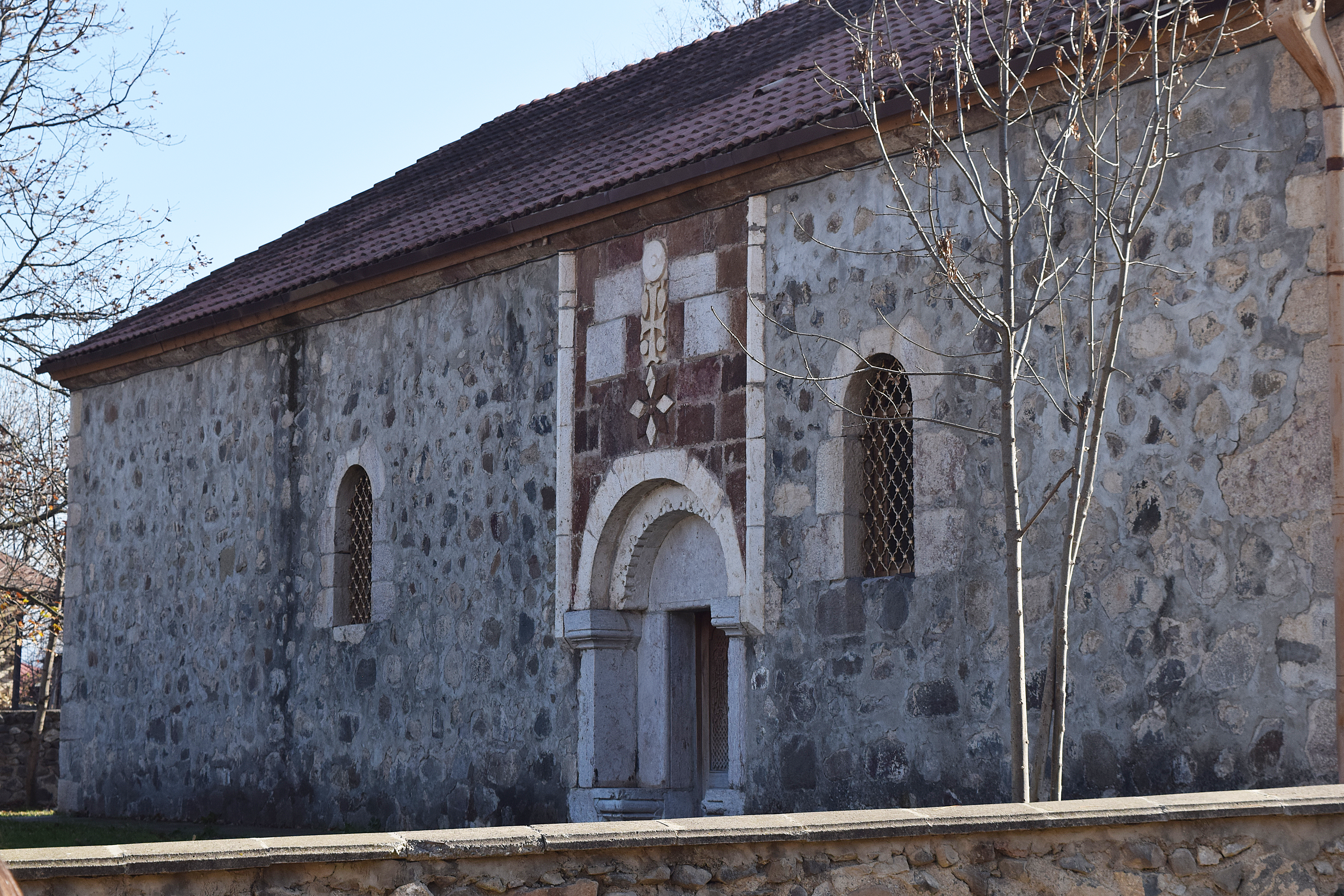
St. Astvatsatsin Church of Khnatsakh

The modern village was founded in 1770 by settlers from the village of Khnatsakh in the Syunik region of Armenia. During the Soviet period, the village was part of the Askeran District of the Nagorno-Karabakh Autonomous Oblast.

== Historical heritage sites ==
Historical heritage sites in and around the village include the 12th/13th-century village of Kghategh (Armenian: Քղատեղ), a 13th-century khachkar, the 17th/18th-century shrine of Parur (Armenian: Պարուր), an 18th/19th-century cemetery, and the 19th-century church of Surb Astvatsatsin (Armenian: Սուրբ Աստվածածին, lit. 'Holy Mother of God').

== Economy and culture ==
The population is mainly engaged in agriculture and animal husbandry, as well as in different state institutions. As of 2015, the village has a municipal building, a house of culture, a secondary school, and a medical centre.

== Demographics ==
The village had 592 inhabitants in 2005, and 684 inhabitants in 2015.

As of January 2026, 129 Azerbaijani families, comprising 455 people, have been resettled in the Khanyurdu village by Azerbaijan.

== Gallery ==
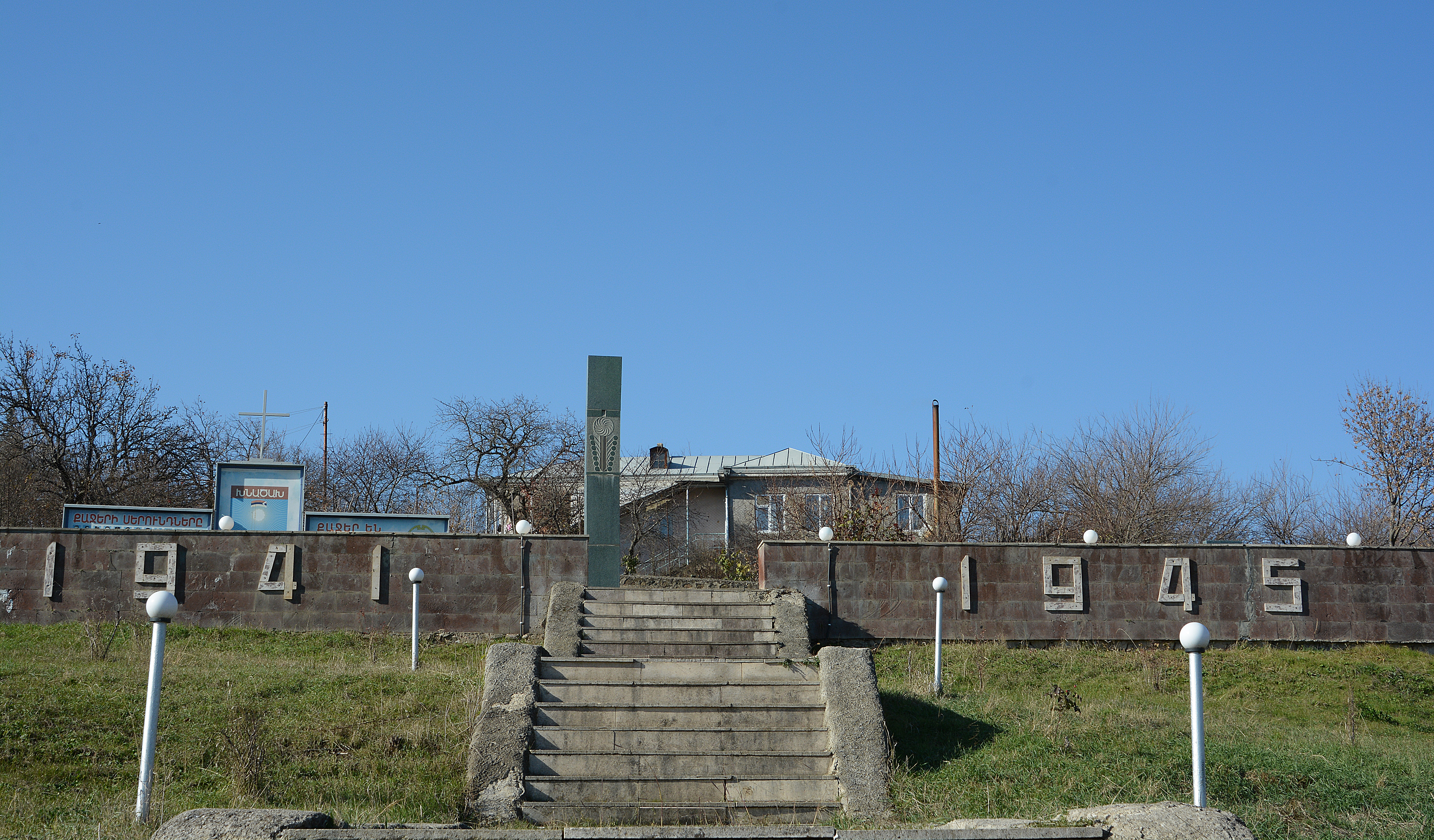
WWII monument

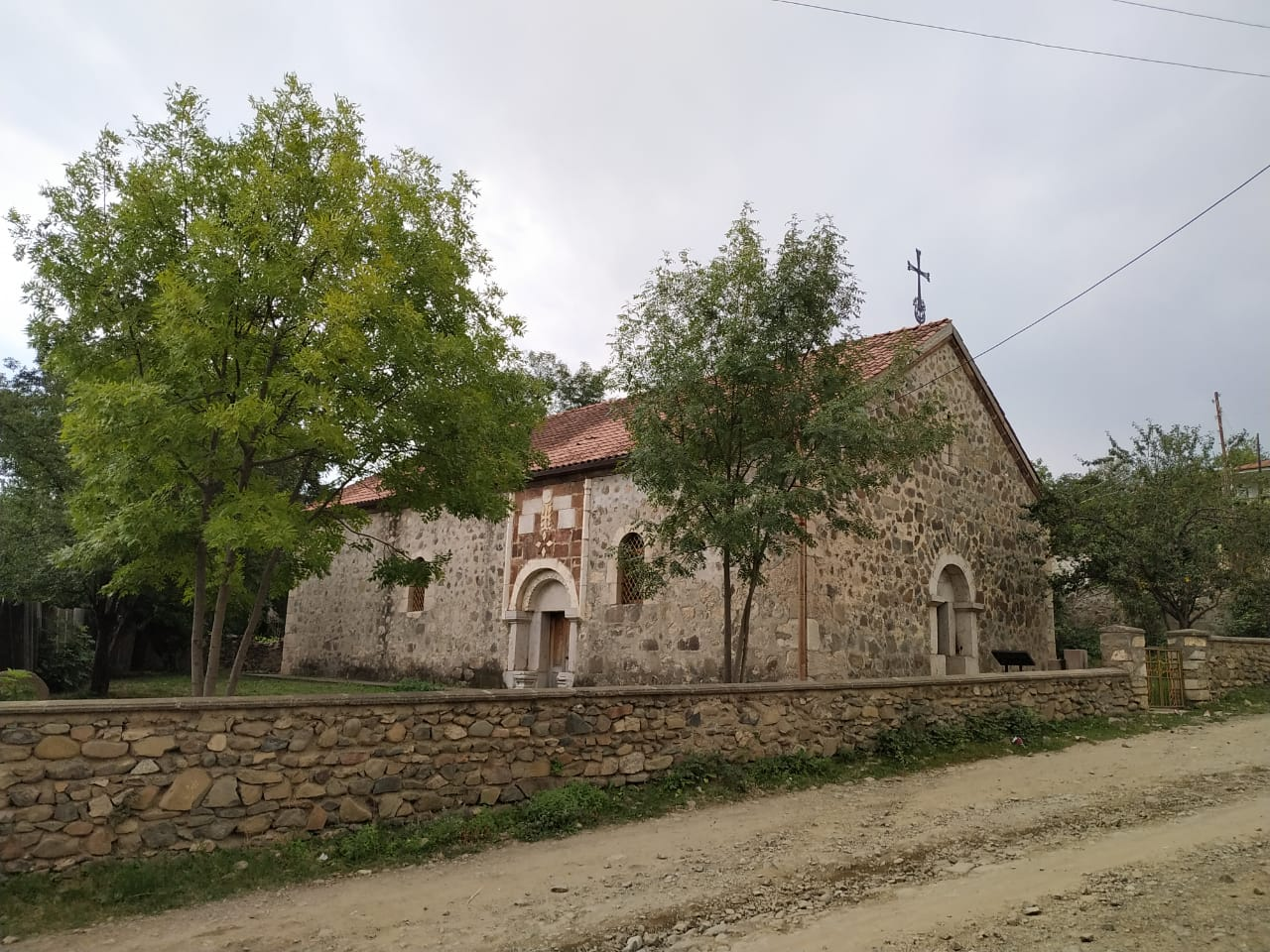
St. Astvatsatsin Church

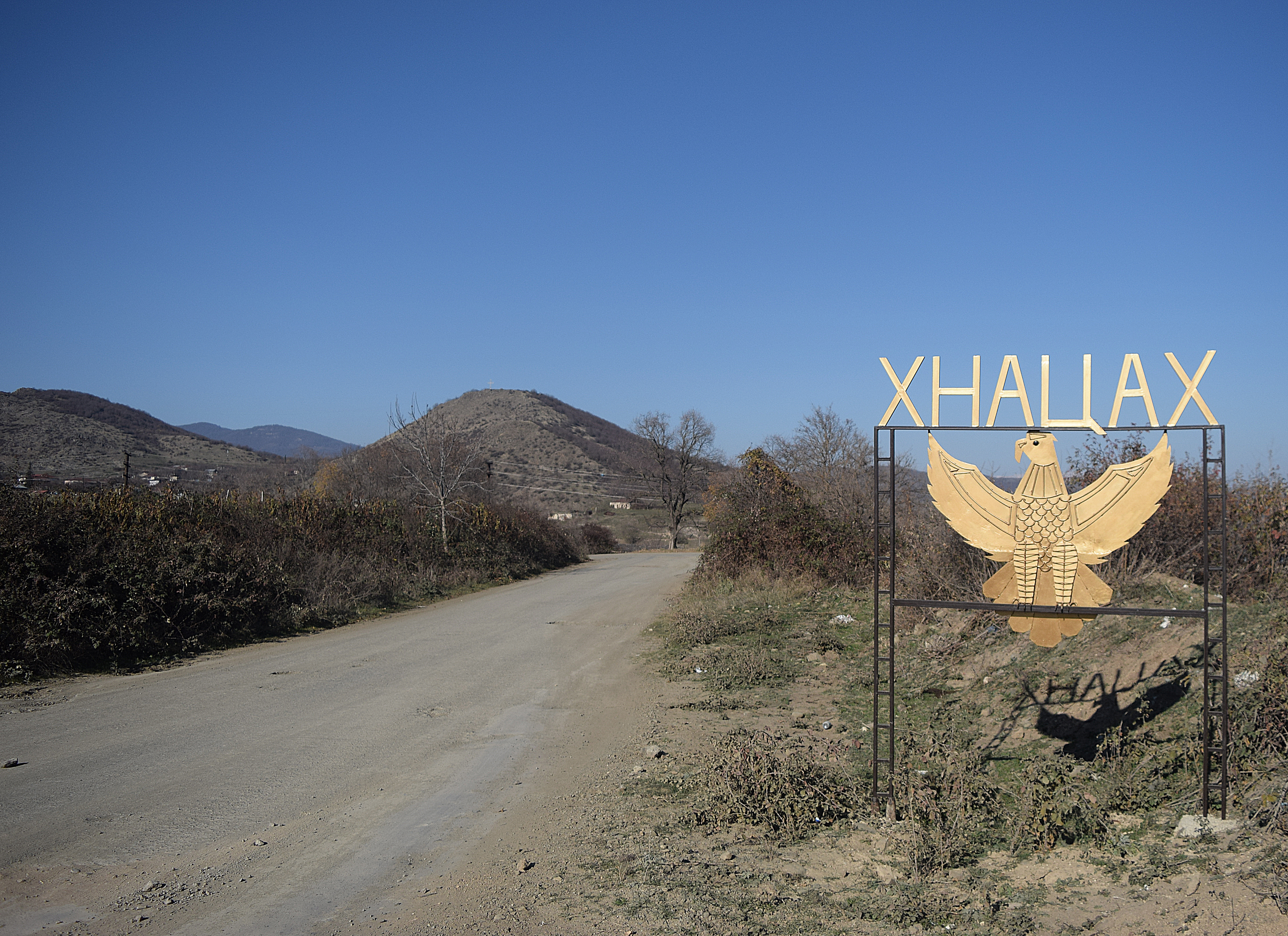
Entrance to the village, sign reading "Khnatsakh" in Cyrillic script

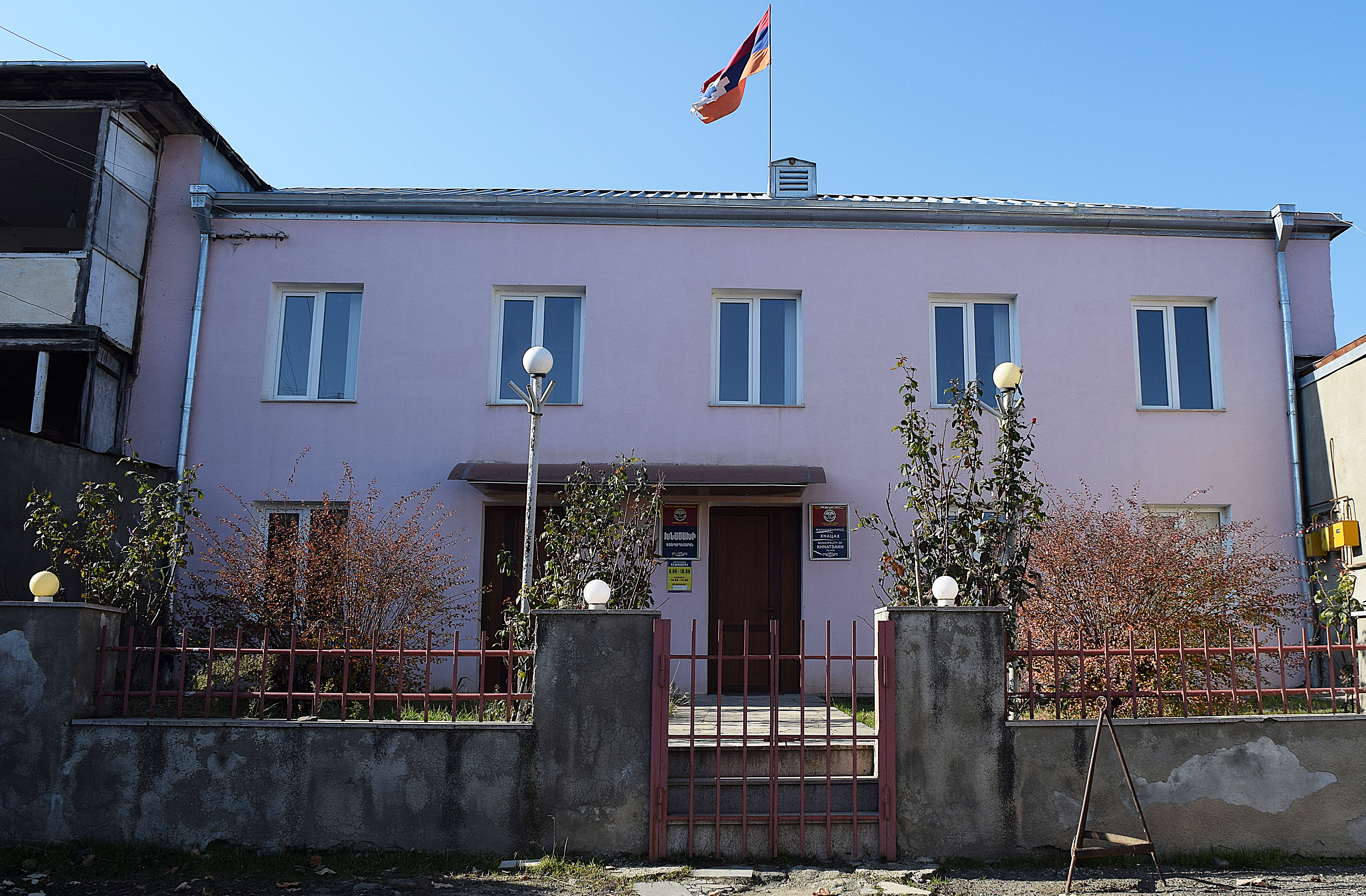
Municipal building

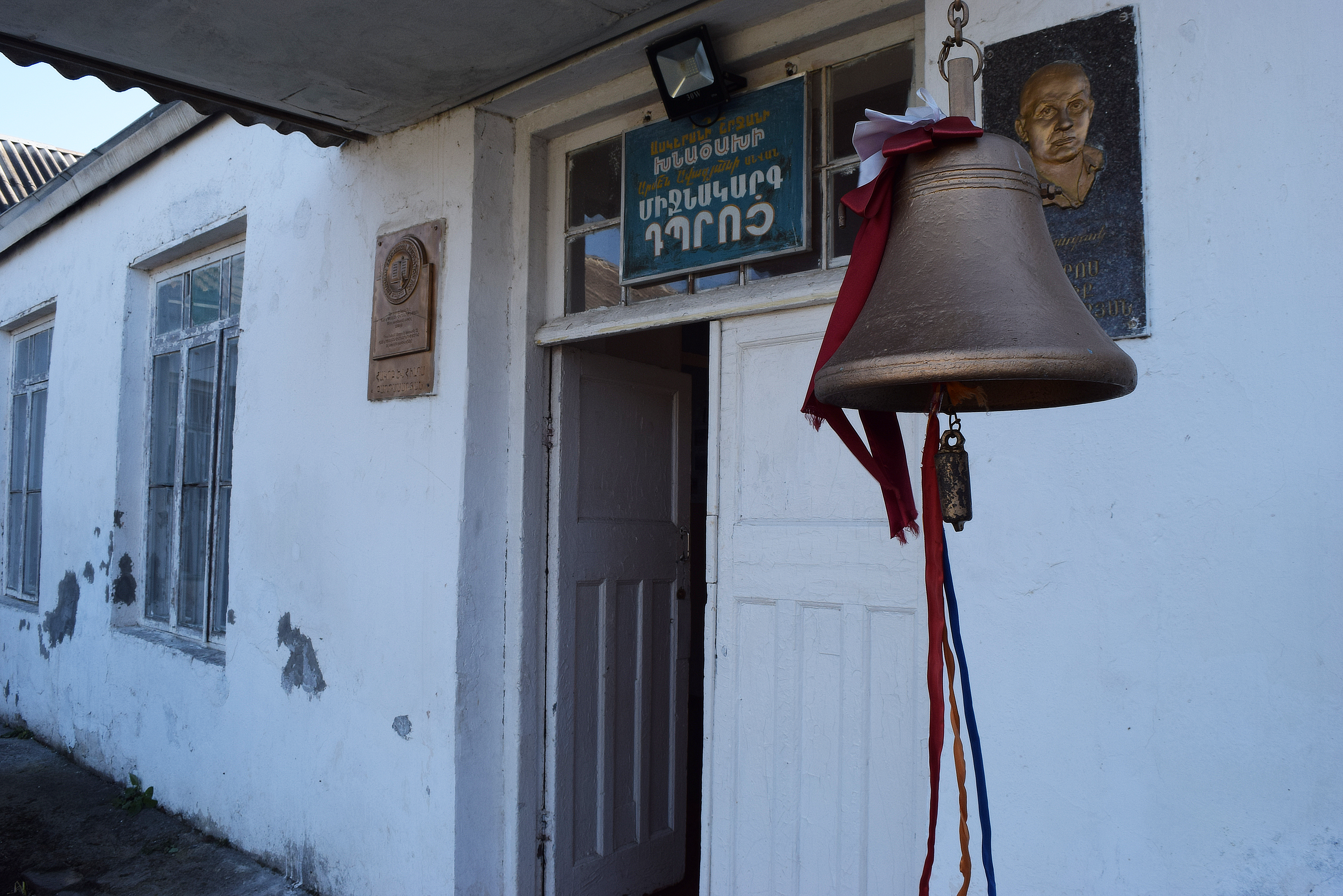
School

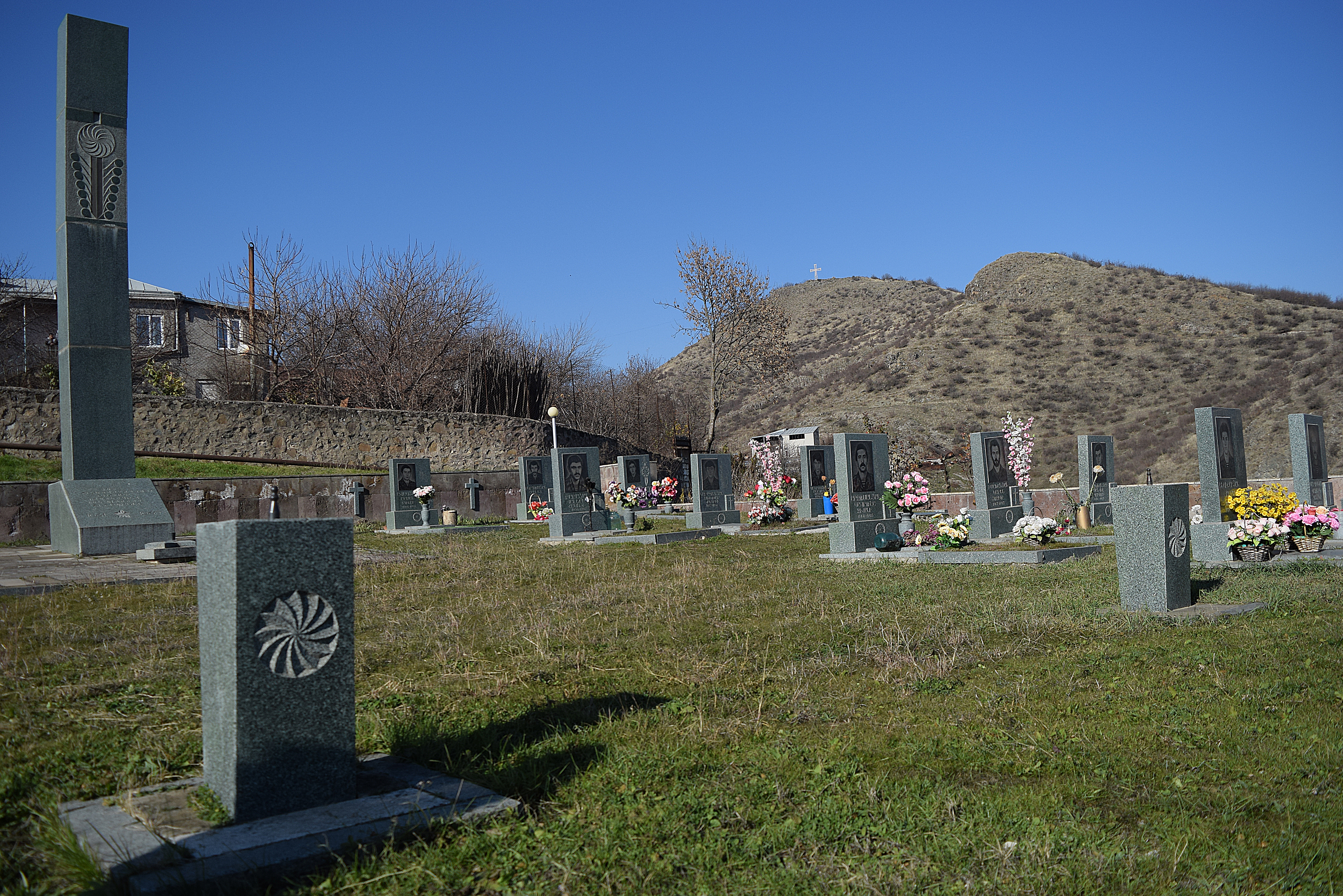
Cemetery
