= Kəbirli, Beylagan =

Kəbirli
- Municipality
- Location within Azerbaijan
- Coordinates: 39°51′07″N 47°31′57″E
- Country: Azerbaijan
- Rayon: Beylagan

Population
  - Total: 4,250
- Time zone: UTC+4 (AZT)
  - Summer (DST): UTC+5 (AZT)

Kəbirli (also, Kebirli) is a village and municipality in the Beylagan Rayon of Azerbaijan. It has a population of 4,250.

== Notable natives ==
- Mukhtar Gasimov — National Hero of Azerbaijan.
