= Kəbirli, Tartar =

Kəbirli
- Municipality
- Location within Azerbaijan Location within Karabakh Economic Region
- Coordinates: 40°27′N 47°01′E
- Country: Azerbaijan
- Rayon: Tartar

Population
  - Total: 702
- Time zone: UTC+4 (AZT)
  - Summer (DST): UTC+5 (AZT)

Kəbirli (also, Kebirli and Kyabirli) is a village and municipality in the Tartar Rayon of Azerbaijan. It has a population of 702.
