= Kyrkhlyar =

Cemetery in Derbent, Russia

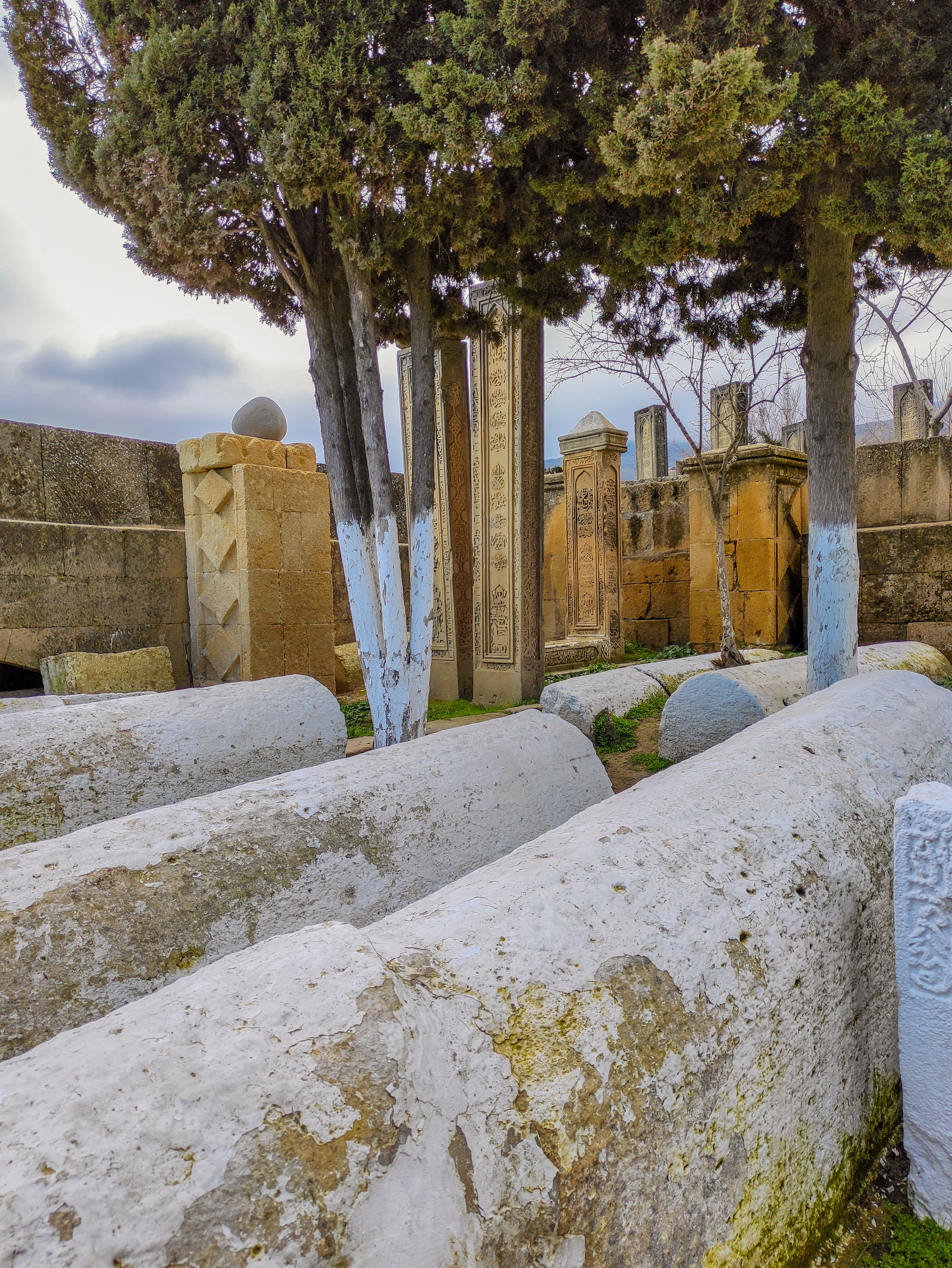
- The Kyrkhlyar cemetery in Derbent, Dagestan
- Interactive map of Kyrkhlyar

Details
- Established: 7th century
- Location: Derbent
- Country: Russia
- Coordinates: 42°03′45″N 48°17′00″E
- Type: Public
- Style: Muslim cemetery

The Kyrkhlyar is an old and revered cemetery in the city of Derbent, a city in the Russian Republic of Dagestan. The oldest active Muslim cemetery in Russia.

== Description ==
It is located less than a kilometer north of the gates of Kyrkhlyar-Kapy. The cemetery is enclosed by a two-meter-high two-tiered fence of well-hewn stones, apparently rebuilt several times. There is an entrance portal on the north side of the fence.

The Kyrkhlyar is part of the northern city cemetery. The cemetery consists of two rectangles adjacent to each other with long sides with large and small compartments. There are 40 ancient chest-shaped tombstones, in the large compartment there are three rows, and the smaller compartment consists of one row. Tombstone sarcophagi up to 3.2 meters (10.4987 ft.) long, 80 centimeters (31.4961 in.) high, 70 centimeters (27.5591 in.) wide and 10-12 centimeters (3.94 in.-4.72 in.) thick. Inside the large compartment there is a small rectangular structure 185 centimeters (72.8346 in.) high. The structure ends with a dome and also has an arched niche for sacrifices.

== History ==
According to medieval Arabic sources and the local historical chronicle "Derbent-name", this burial is associated with the first campaign of the Muslims in the Caucasus led by the sahabi (companion) Salman ibn Rabiah al-Bahili. During the further advance into the Western Turkic Khaganate, part of the Arab army was killed in the battle, and among them 40 companions of the Prophet Muhammad. These 40 companions are buried in the Kyrkhlyar cemetery, from which the name of the cemetery comes. In subsequent centuries, the cemetery was constantly expanded. As a burial place for martyrs (shahid), it became a place of pilgrimage (ziyarat) for Muslims.

== Literature ==
A. Alikberov. Kyrkhlyar. Islam in the territory of the former Russian Empire. Encyclopedic Dictionary. "Eastern Literature" of the Russian Academy of Sciences, 2006. Volume 1. p. 159. ISBN 5020180475.
