= Church of the Holy All-Savior of Derbent =

Church of the Holy All-Savior
- Սուրբ Ամենափրկիչ եկեղեցի (Armenian)
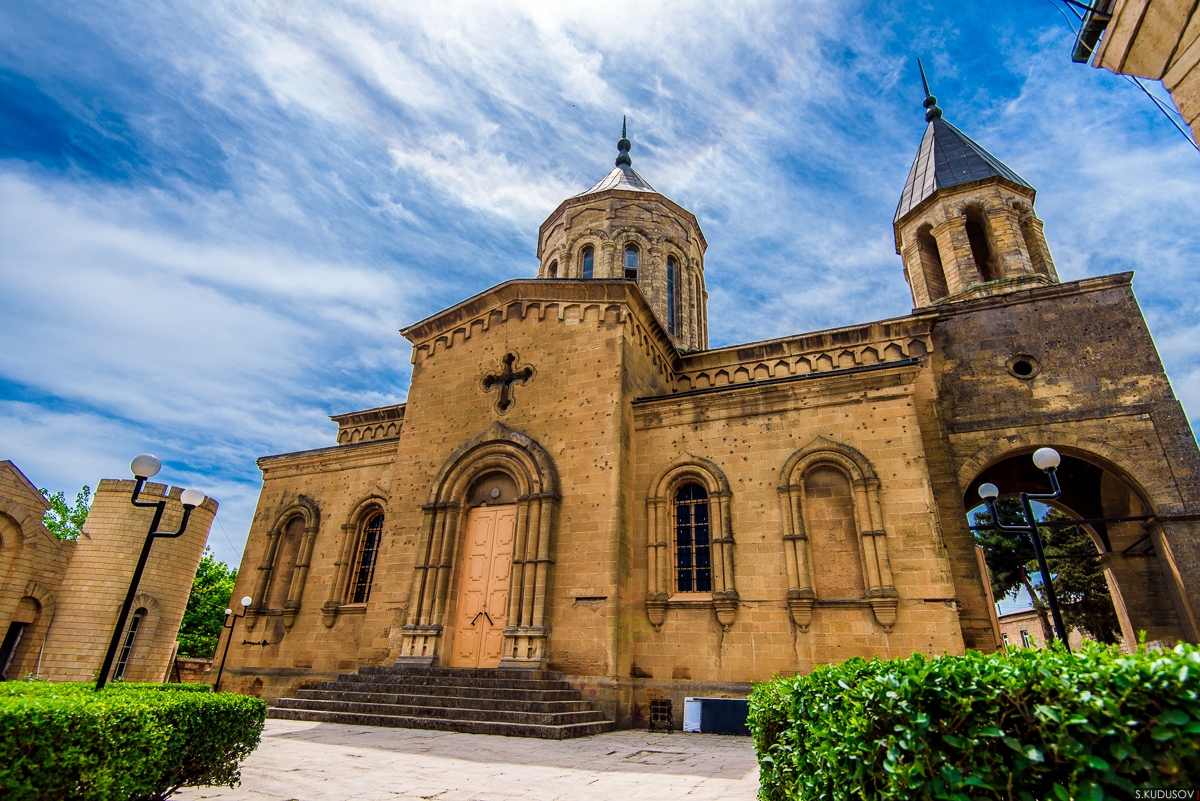
- Church of the Holy All-Savior
- 42°03′25″N 48°17′13″E
- Location: Derbent
- Country: Russia
- Denomination: Armenian Apostolic Church
- Website: Church of the Holy All-Savior

History
- Consecrated: 1872

Architecture
- Architect: Gabriel Sundukian
- Style: Armenian church architecture
- Groundbreaking: 1860
- Completed: 1871

Specifications
- Length: 22.5 metres (74 ft)
- Width: 15.7 metres (52 ft)
- Height: 25 metres (82 ft)

Administration
- Diocese: Southern Russia

UNESCO World Heritage Site
- Official name: Citadel, Ancient City and Fortress Buildings of Derbent
- Type: Cultural
- Criteria: iii, iv
- Reference no.: 1070
- Region: Europe and North America

The Church of the Holy All-Savior (Surb Amenaprkich) (Russian: Церковь Святого Всеспасителя; Armenian: Սուրբ Ամենափրկիչ եկեղեցի) is an Armenian Church of Derbent, a city in the Russian Republic of Dagestan.

== History ==
The author of the church project was the Armenian writer Gabriel Sundukian, who was exiled in Derbent in the 1850s. The church was built in 1870 (according to other sources in 1871) in the Armenian quarter of the city, on the site of a chapel. In 1888, a bell tower was added to the church. It was badly damaged during the Civil War, in particular, the dodecahedral hipped drum, the upper hipped tier of the bell tower and the roof were destroyed.

By the Decree of the Council of Ministers of the DASSR No. 289 of August 15, 1975, the church building was recognized as an architectural monument and taken under state protection. From 1976 to 1982 the building was restored, the lost elements were rebuilt. After restoration, it was transferred to, the Derbent State Historical, Architectural and Art Museum-Reserve (it houses the department of "Carpet and Decorative arts").

Since May 2009, baptismal and wedding ceremonies for parishioners have been periodically held in the church.

== Architecture ==
The building of the church is cross-domed, size 22.5 by 15.7 m. It was built from hewn shell stones, the walls were not plastered. In the center of the hall there are four pillars supporting a dodecahedral drum. Narrow northern and southern branches of the cross adjoin the wide space under the dome, and a rectangular apse on the eastern side. The external volumes of the temple follow a well-developed system: they clearly convey the cross-domed composition of the building. The branches of the cross are marked with high-proportioned tongs; the corners are slightly lowered. The building is placed on a high stone plinth. Stone stairs lead to all three entrances (from the north, west and south). The entrances to the temple, located on the northern, western and southern facades, are framed by portals of pilasters and semi-columns, turning into arches with keeled ends. There are four windows on the north and south facades and two on the west. Each have two blind arcade).

The apse is designed as a rectangular ledge with a blind arcade window. Above the northern and southern portals, as well as on the apse, there are cruciform windows.

== Bibliography ==
- Kozubsky E. I. History of the city of Derbent. Temirkhan-Shura. 1906

== Photo Gallery ==
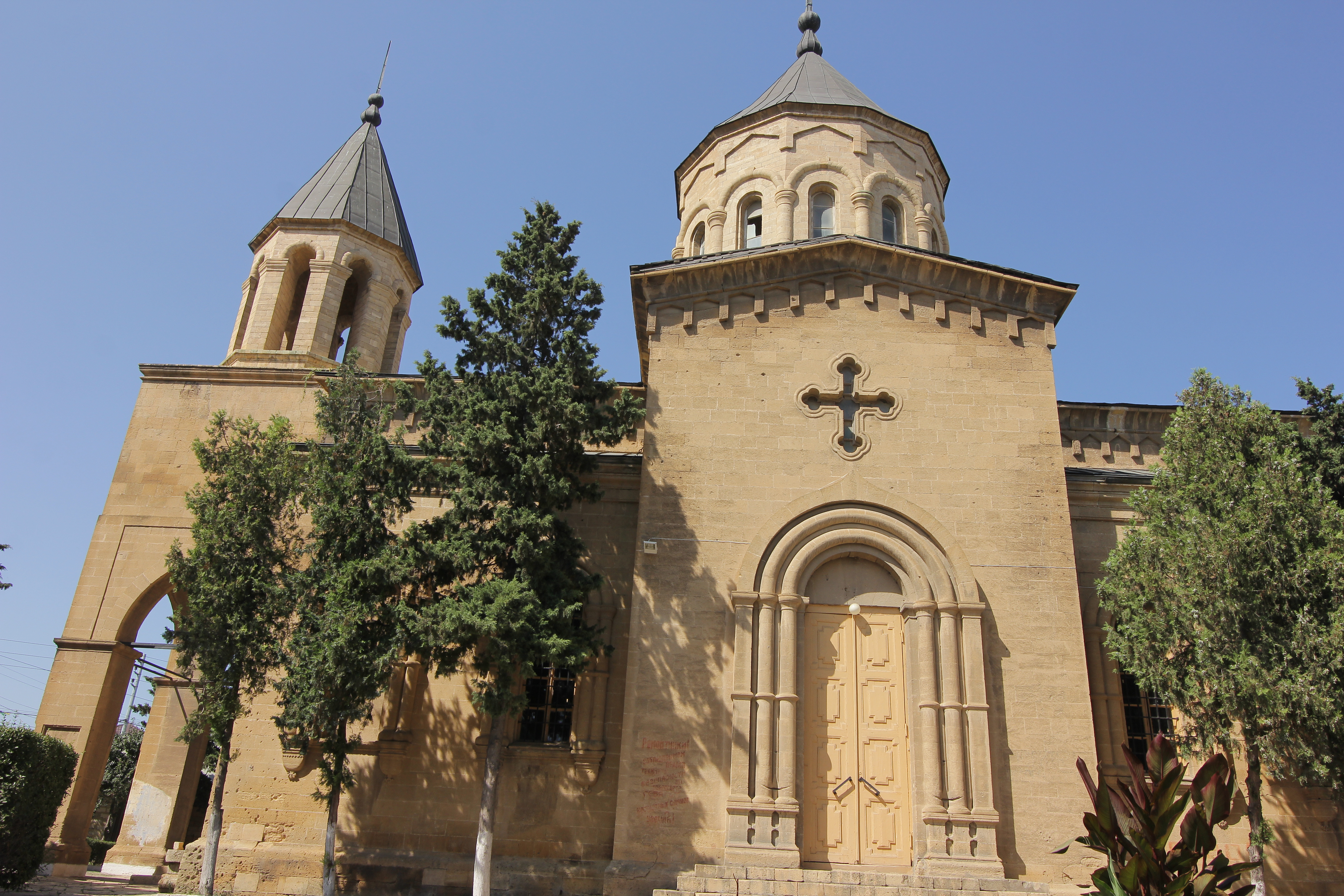
View of the church

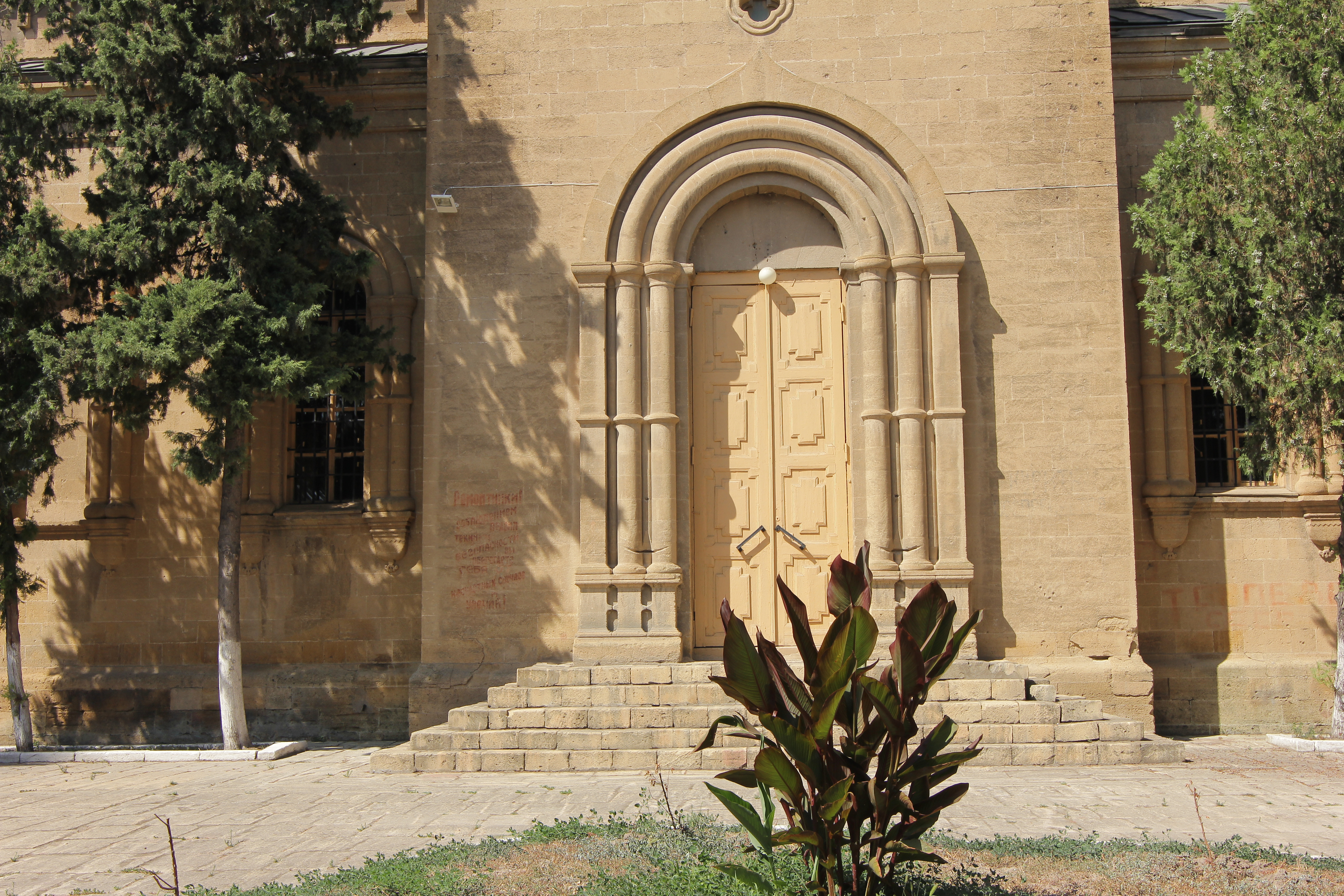
Door of the church

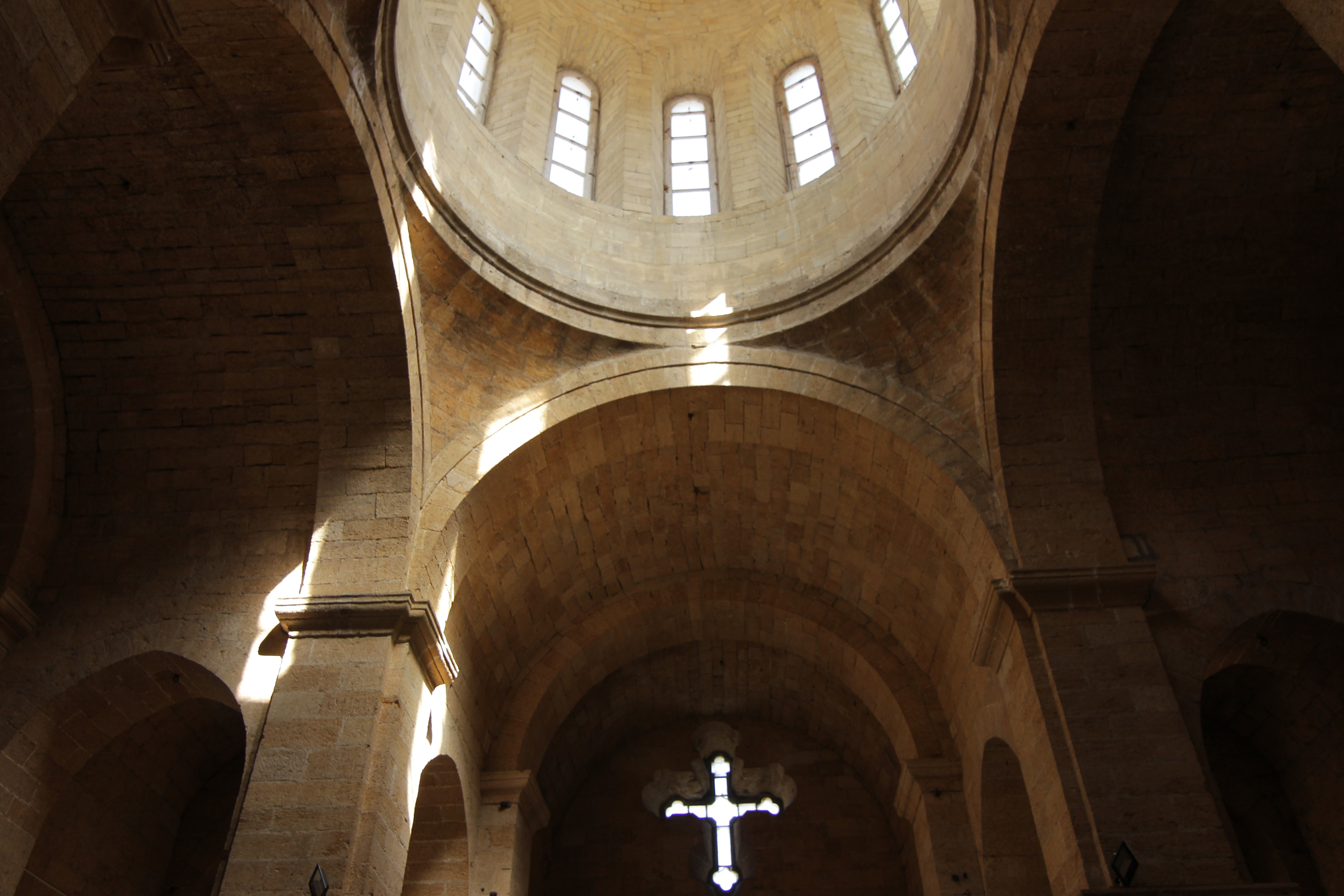
Arches and columns of the church

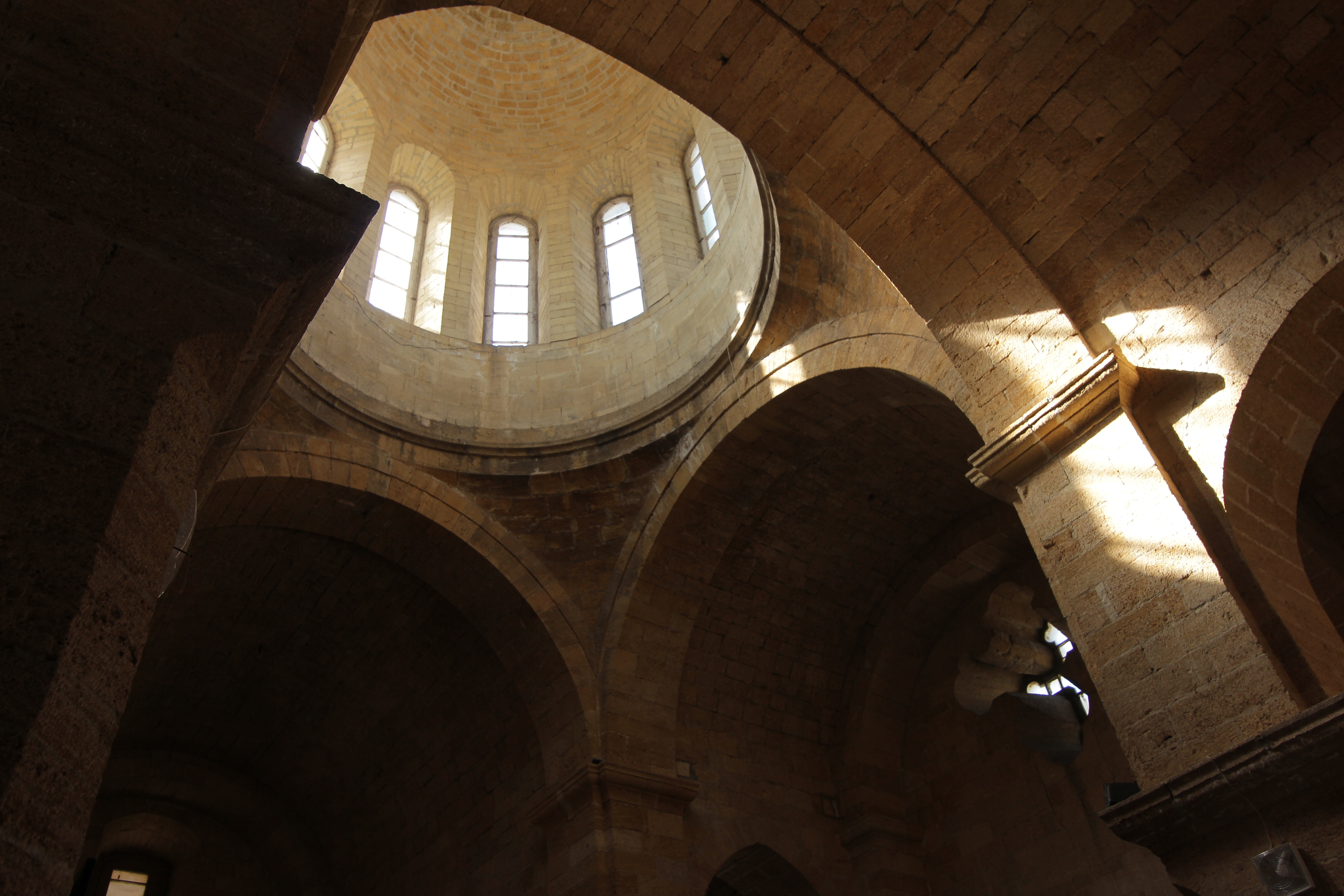
Vault of the church

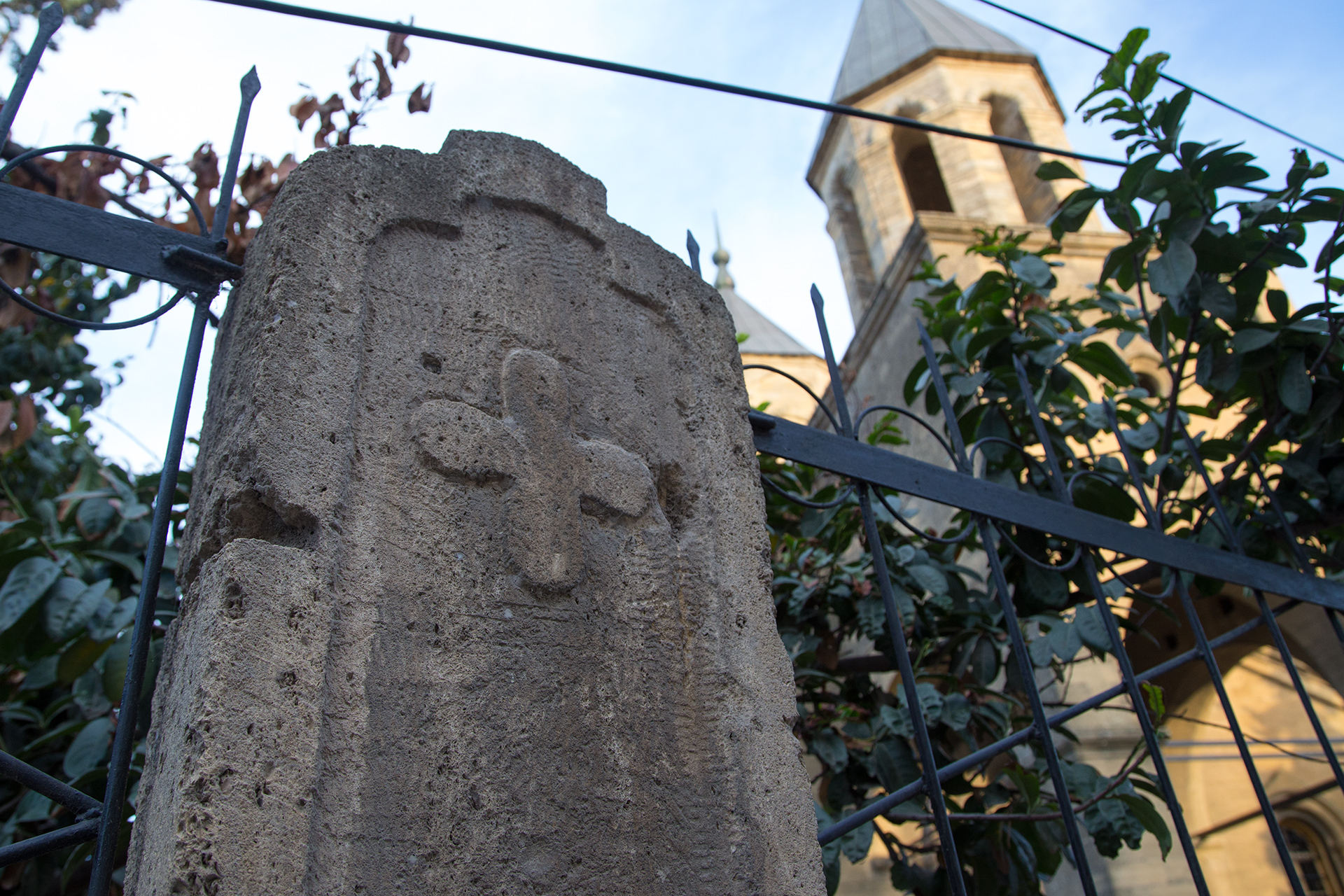
Church fence

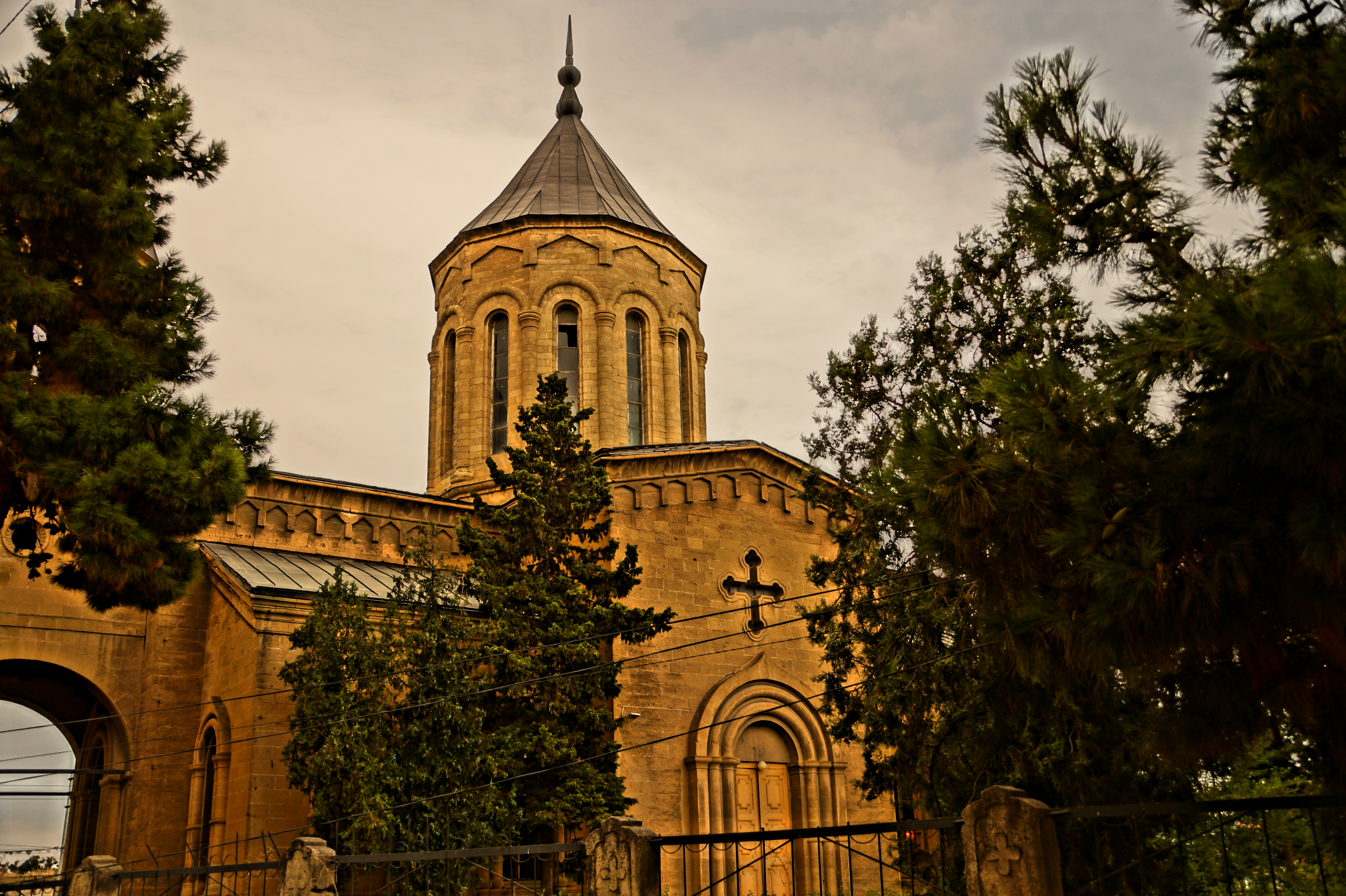
View of the church

== See also ==
- Armenian temple in Derbent
