= Juma Mosque of Derbent =

Mosque in Derbent, Dagestan, Russia

- Дербентская Джума-мечеть
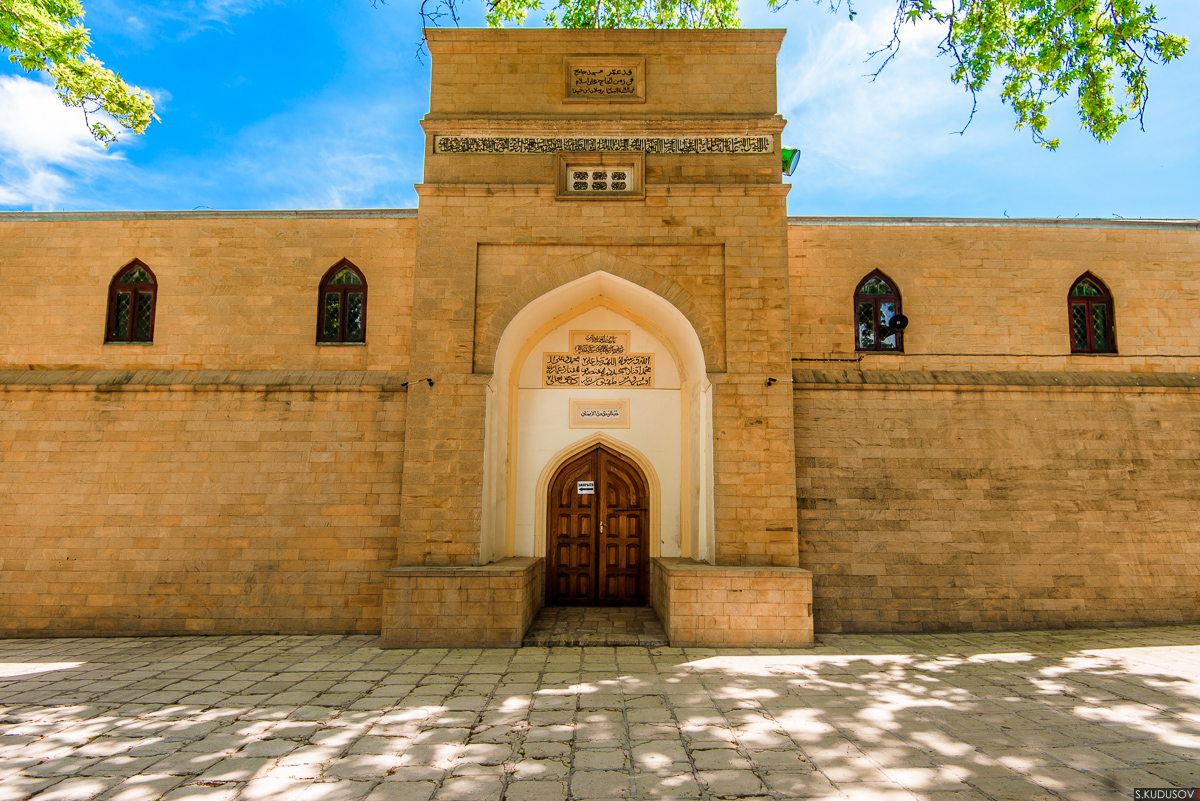

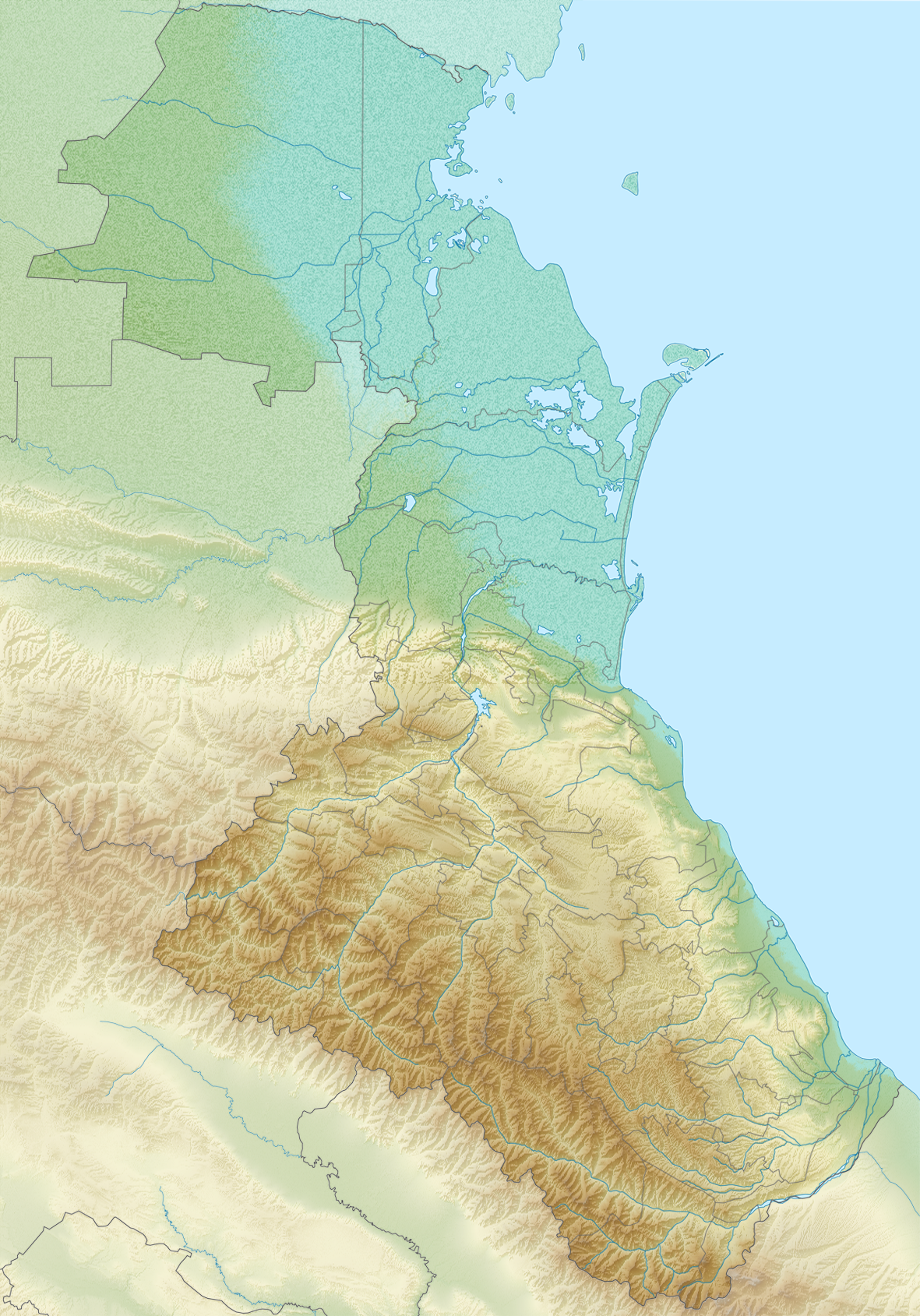
- Location of the mosque and madrasa in Dagestan

Religion
- Affiliation: Shia Islam
- Ecclesiastical or organisational status: Friday mosque; Madrasa
- Patron: Muftiate of the Republic of Dagestan
- Status: Active

Location
- Location: Derbent, Dagestan
- Country: Russia
- Coordinates: 42°03′19″N 48°16′47″E

Architecture
- Type: Mosque architecture
- Style: Islamic
- Founder: Maslama ibn Abd al-Malik
- Groundbreaking: 733–734 CE

Specifications
- Length: 68 m (223 ft)
- Width: 28 m (92 ft)
- Dome: 1
- Dome height (outer): 17 m (56 ft)
- Site area: c. 1,900 m^{2} (20,000 sq ft)
- Materials: Shell stone

UNESCO World Heritage Site
- Official name: Citadel, Ancient City and Fortress Buildings of Derbent
- Criteria: Cultural: iii, iv
- Reference: 1070
- Inscription: 2003 (27th Session)
- Endangered: 2003–
- Area: 37.658 ha (93.05 acres)
- Buffer zone: 451.554 ha (1,115.81 acres)

The Juma Mosque of Derbent is a Shi'ite Friday mosque and madrasa in the center of Old Derbent in the Republic of Dagestan in present-day Russia. The mosque was constructed by Iranians before the separation of Derbent from Iran as result of Treaty of Gulistan after the Russo-Persian War (Russian: Дербентская Джума-мечеть). Completed c. 734 CE, it is the oldest mosque in Europe. Despite its age, the mosque is well-preserved and part of the cultural heritage of the peoples of the Russian Federation. The Juma Mosque is part of the Old Derbent UNESCO World Heritage Site.

== History ==
In 733, one mosque was built in each of Derbent's seven mahallahs. In addition to these mosques, a larger mosque was built for the common Friday prayer. The number of mosques increased, and Derbent had 15 mosques by 1796.

An inscription above the mosque entrance states that in 1368–1369, the mosque was restored after an earthquake by Tazhuddin of Baku. Between 1474 and 1475, construction of a madrasa began. In 1815, the expansion and formation of the mosque complex was completed. During the 1930s, the mosque was closed because of the atheism campaign throughout the USSR. From 1938 to 1943, it was rebuilt as a city prison. In 1943, by a decree from Moscow, the mosque was returned to the city's imams to use for its intended purpose. Its charter was developed that decade, and a board of 20 was elected. Derbent's Sunni and Shi'ite communities have their own imams. The Juma Mosque was the largest in the North Caucasus during the Soviet era, and was the only one in southern Dagestan; believers from throughout the region came to Derbent for Friday prayers. In 2015, in preparation for the celebration of Derbent's 2,000th anniversary, restoration work was done on the mosque.

== Architecture ==
The mosque complex consists of the main mosque, madrasa, and living quarters for the clergy. At the time of construction from 733 to 734 CE, it was Derbent's largest building. The mosque measures 68 meters (223 ft) from west to east and 28 meters (92 ft) from south to north. The dome is 17 meters (56 ft) high.

Its interior consists of three naves separated by square pillars with profiled capitals. The middle nave is 6.3 meters (21 ft) wide, and the side naves are 4 meters (13 ft) wide. Lancet arches are between the pillars.

The mosque's courtyard is 55 by 45 meters (180 by 148 ft), and has four old plane trees by which it can be recognized from anywhere in Derbent. In 2012, the mosque's plane trees were recognized as natural monuments of all-Russian significance and taken under the protection of the Council for the Preservation of the Natural Heritage of the Nation in the Federation Council of the Federal Assembly of the Russian Federation.

== Gallery ==
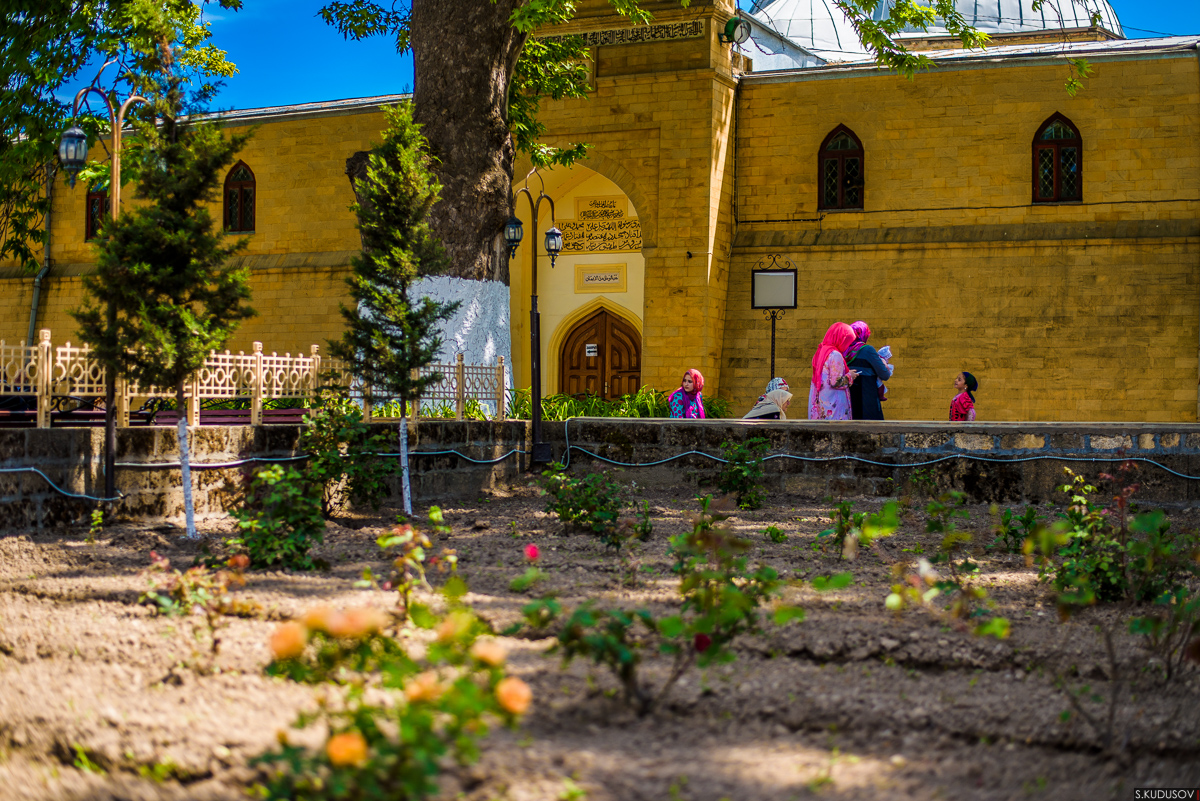
Courtyard

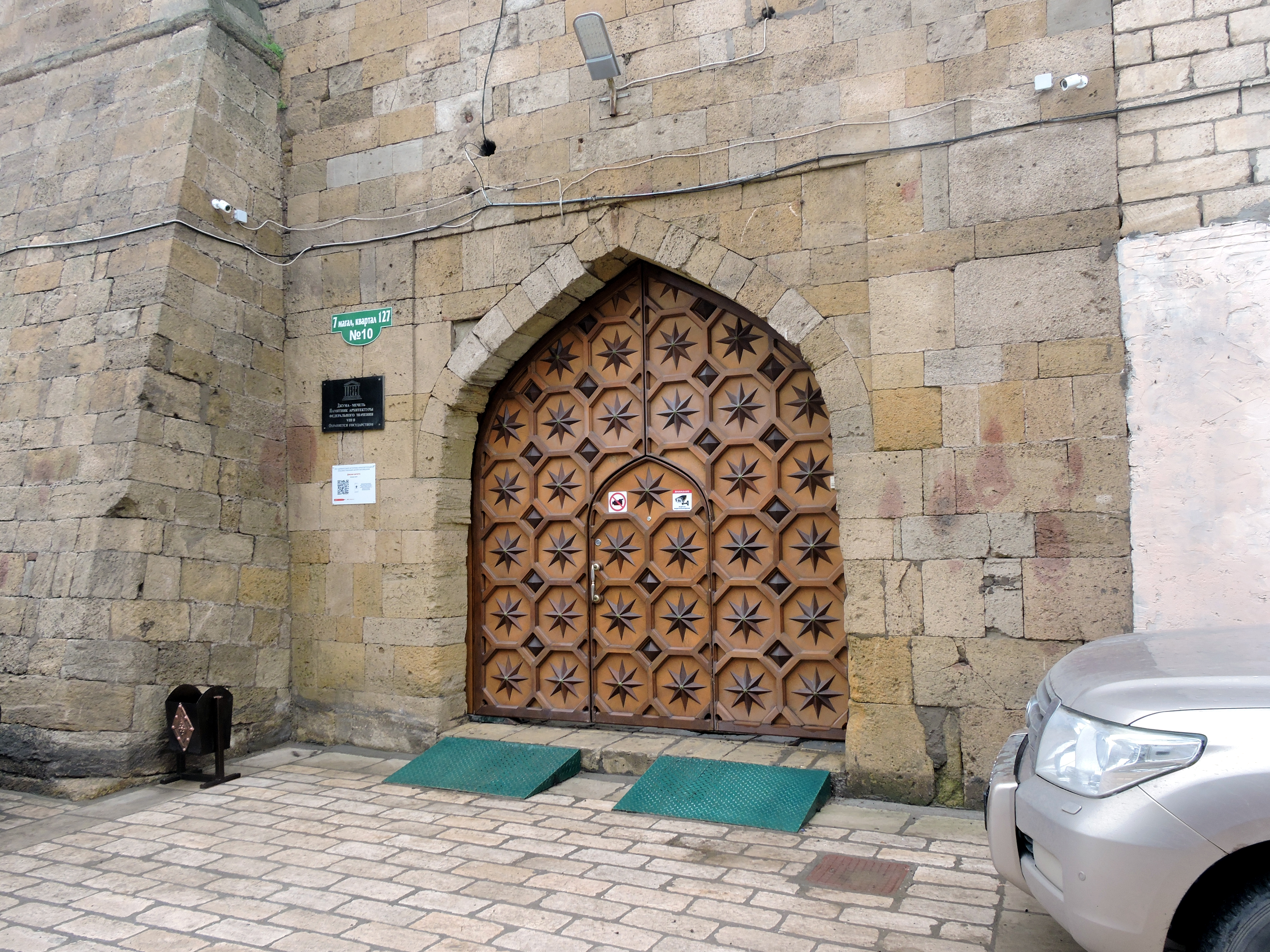
Gate

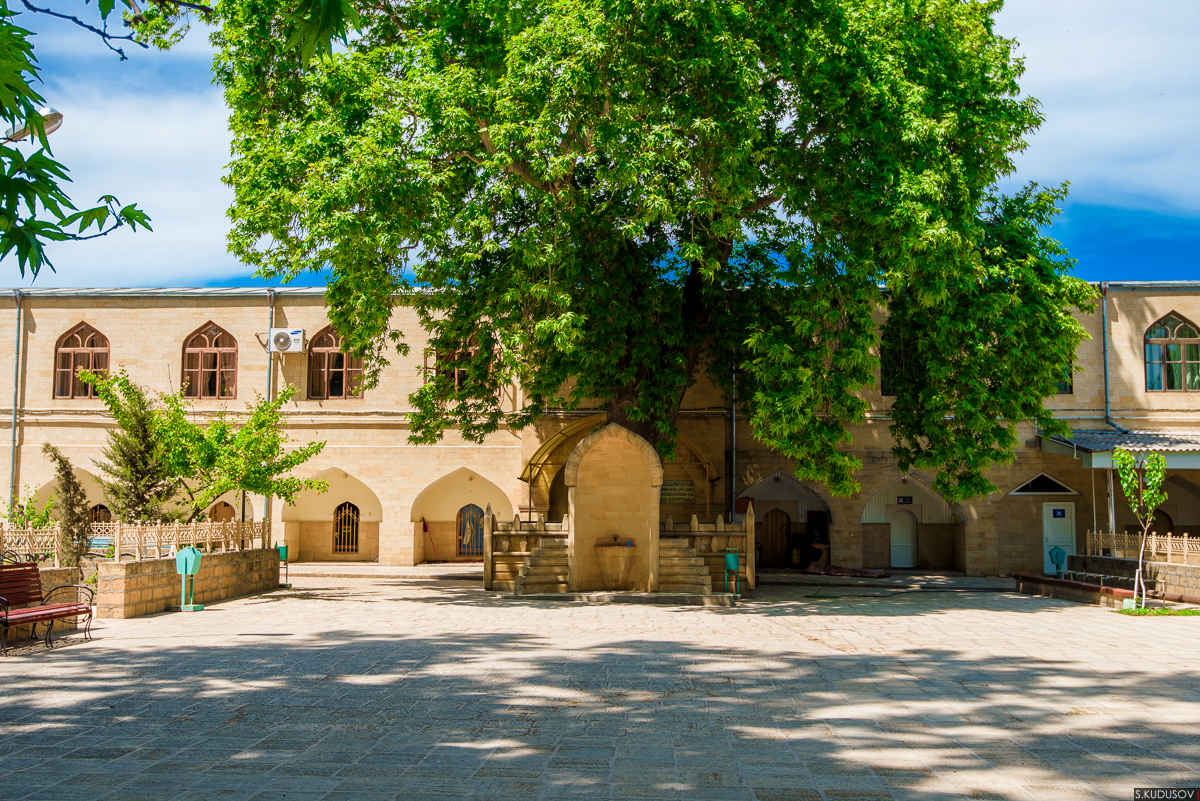
Courtyard

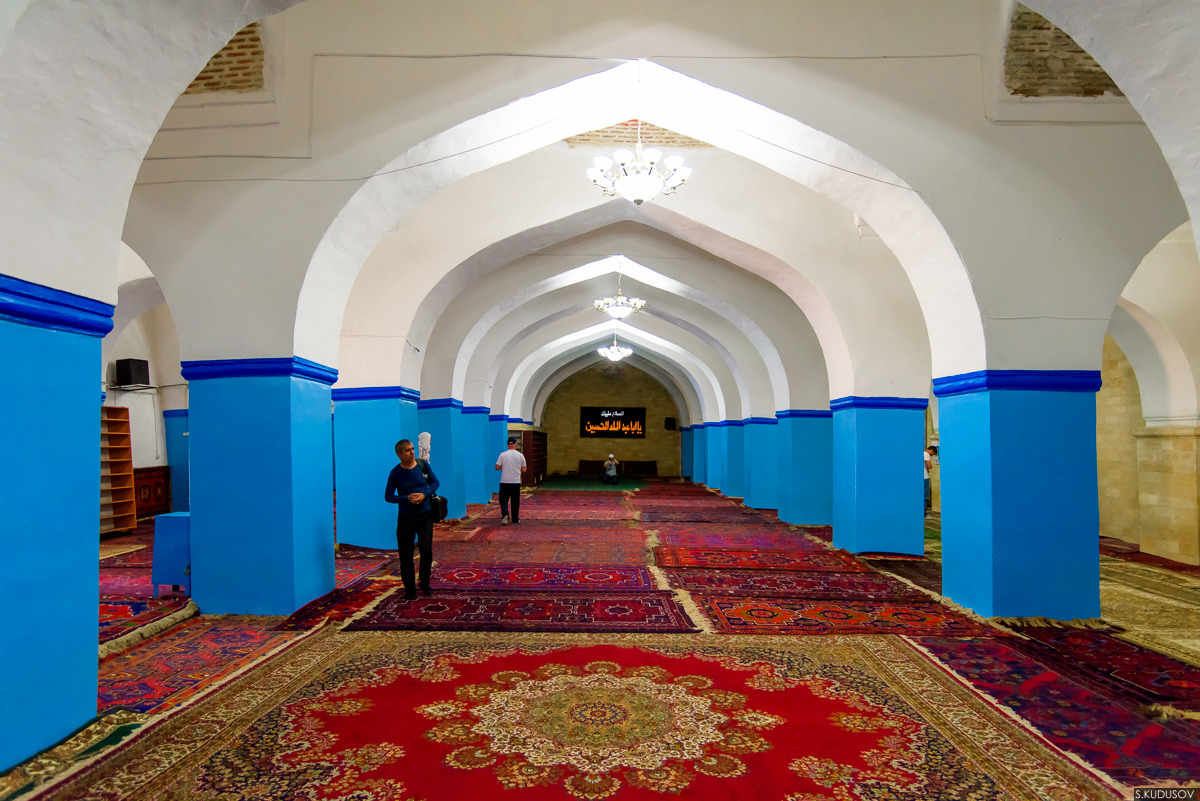
Mosque interior

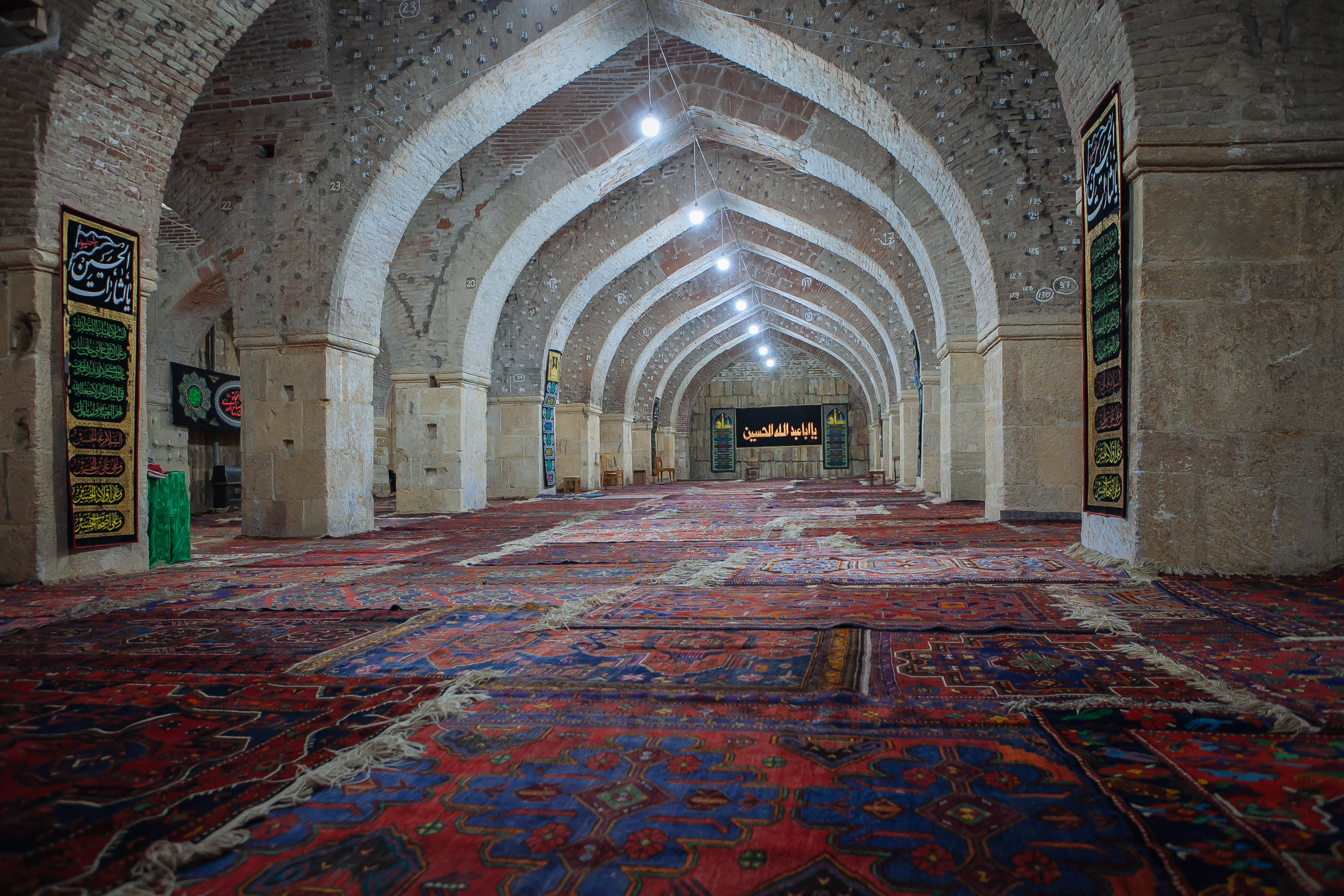
Inside the mosque

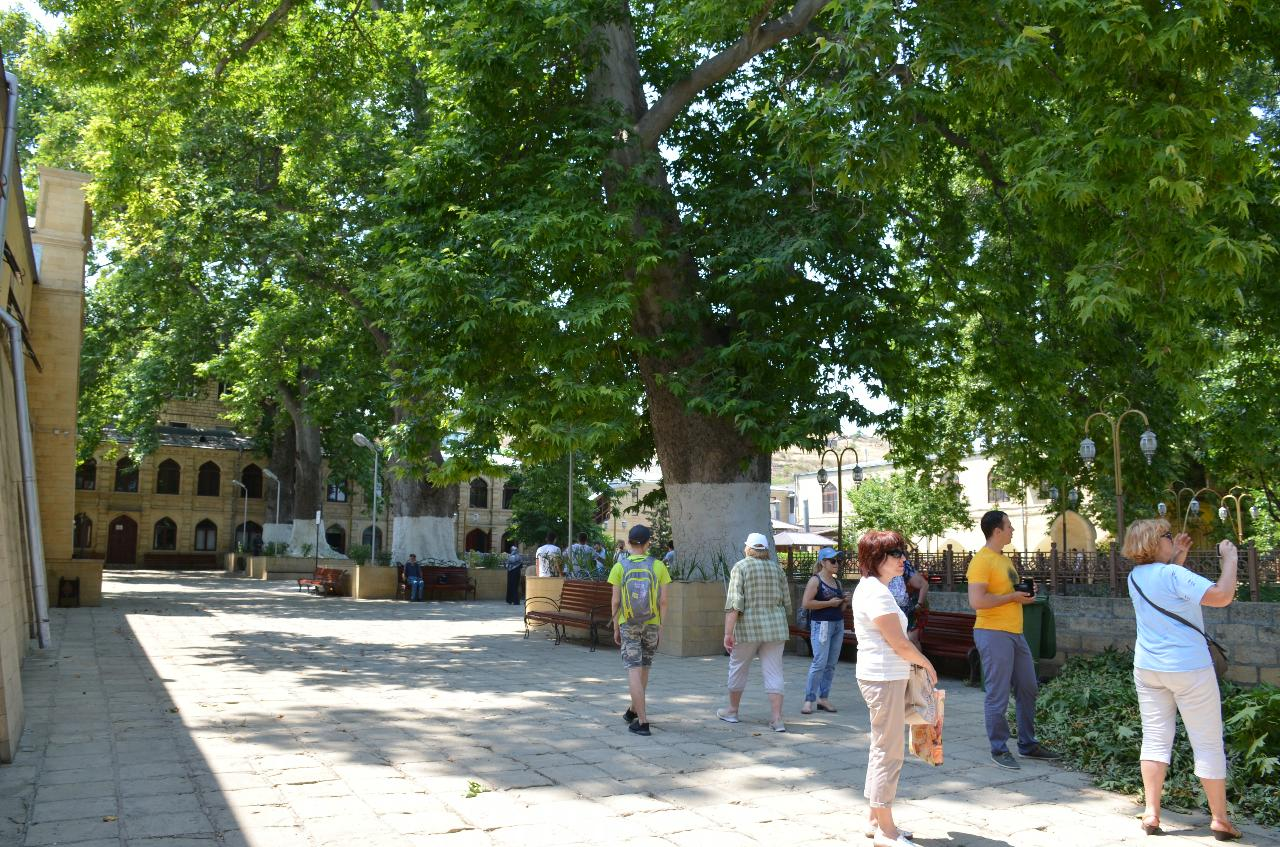
Excursion to the mosque

== See also ==
- Islam in Russia
- List of mosques in Russia
- List of World Heritage Sites in Russia
