= Derbent =

City in the Republic of Dagestan, Russia

Derbent Дербент
- City

Other transcription(s)
  - Lezgin: Цал (Tsal), Кьвевар (Kwevar), Дербент (Derbent)
  - Azerbaijani: Дәрбәнд (Dərbənd)
  - Persian: دربند
  - Dargwa: Чяли
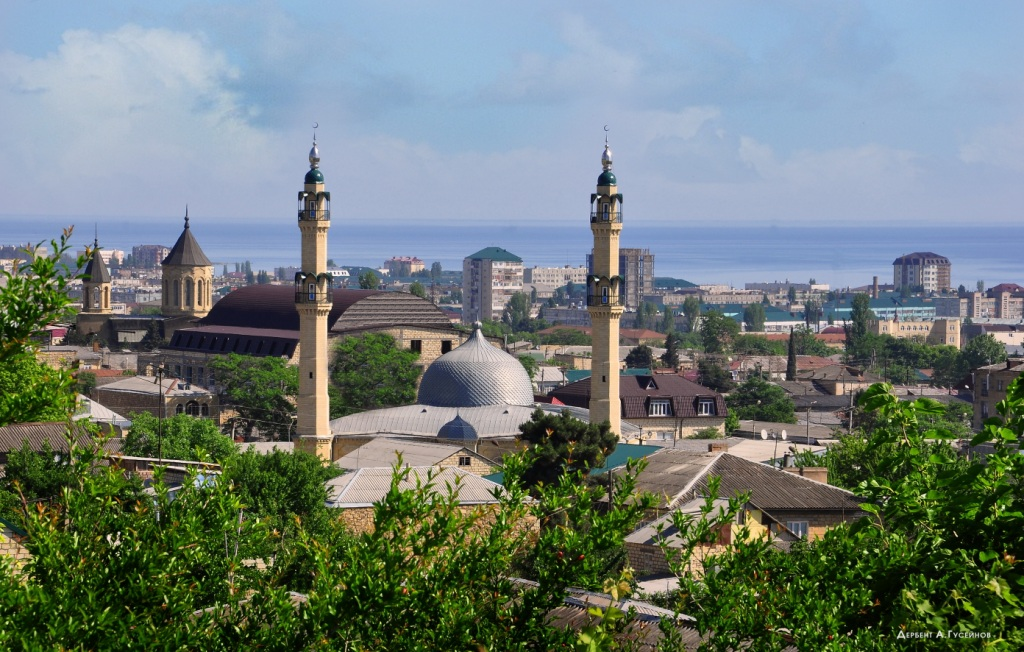
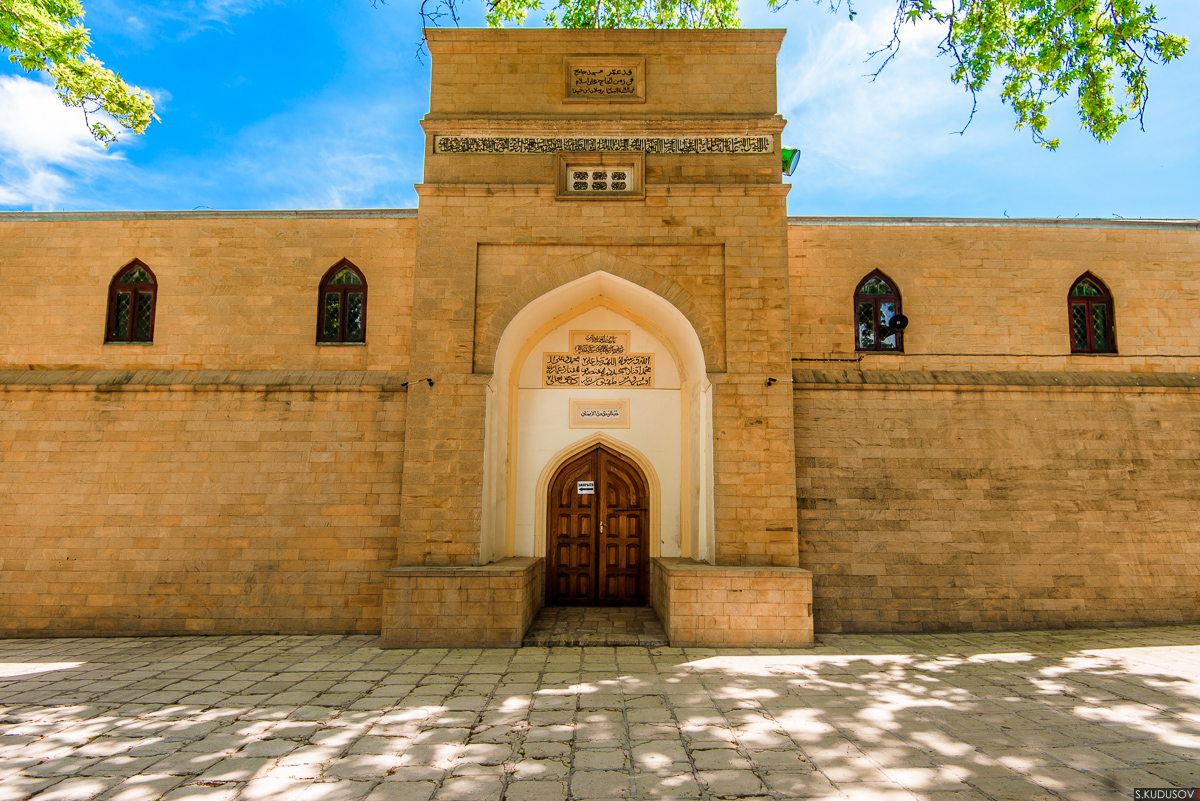
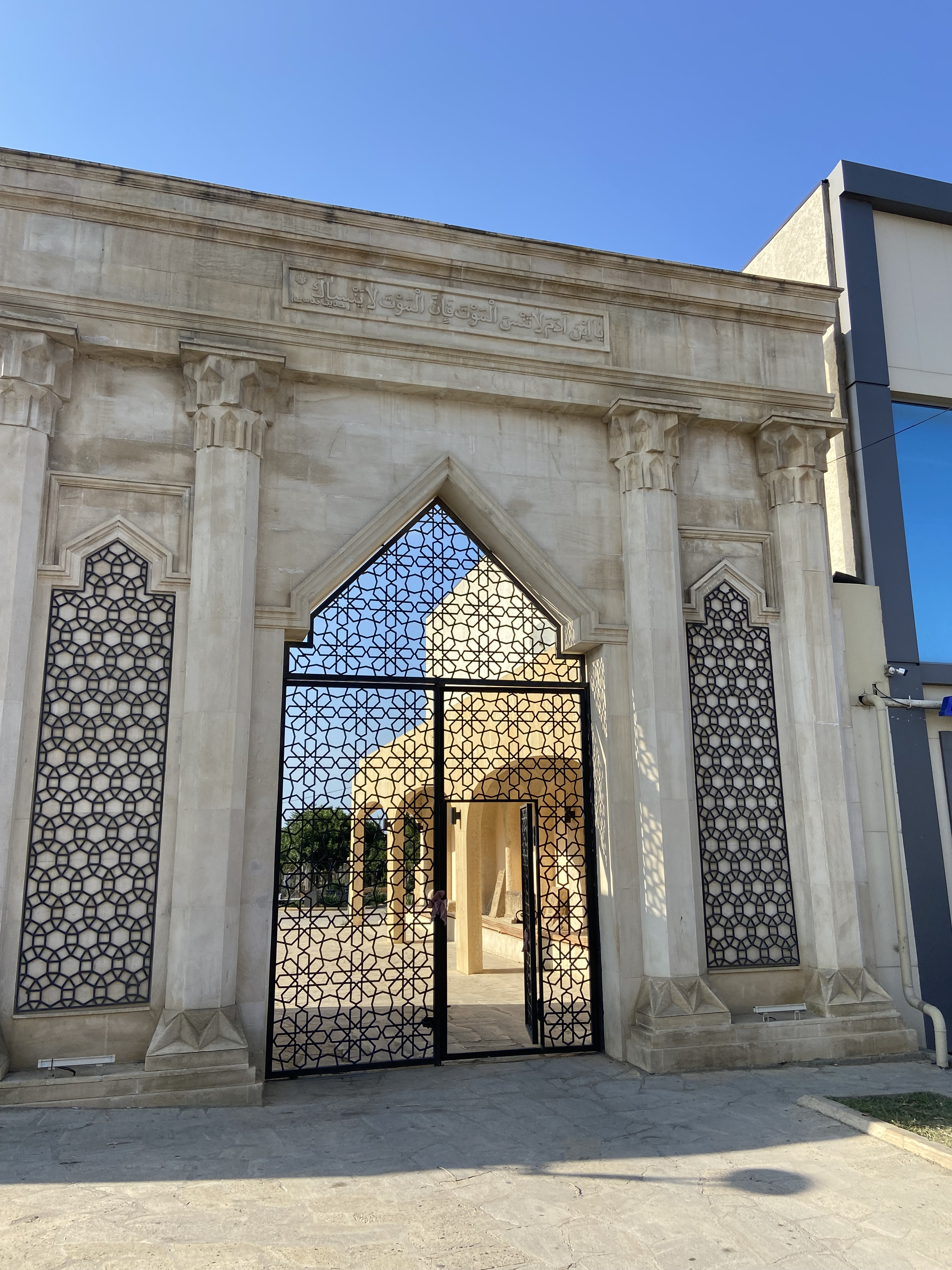
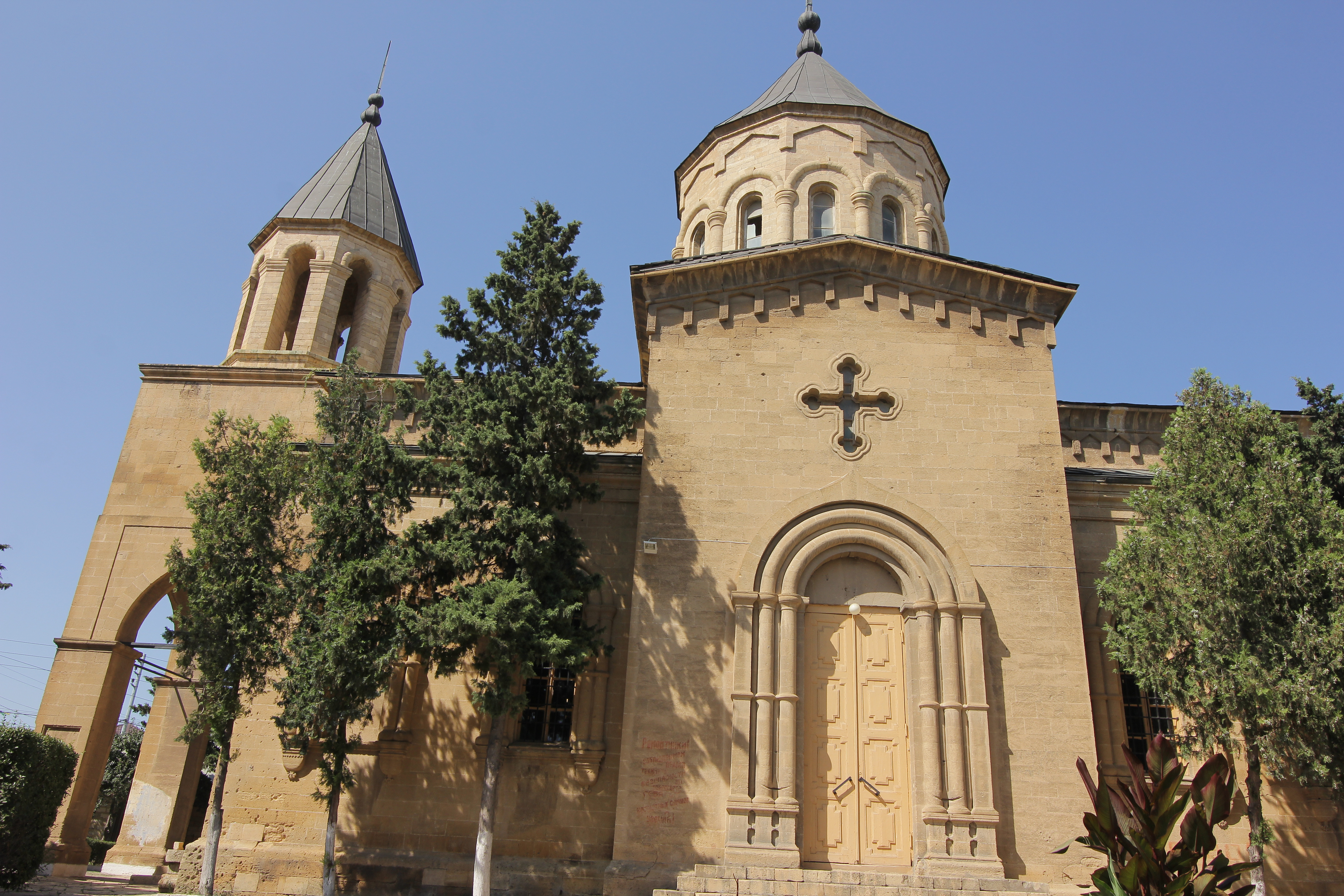
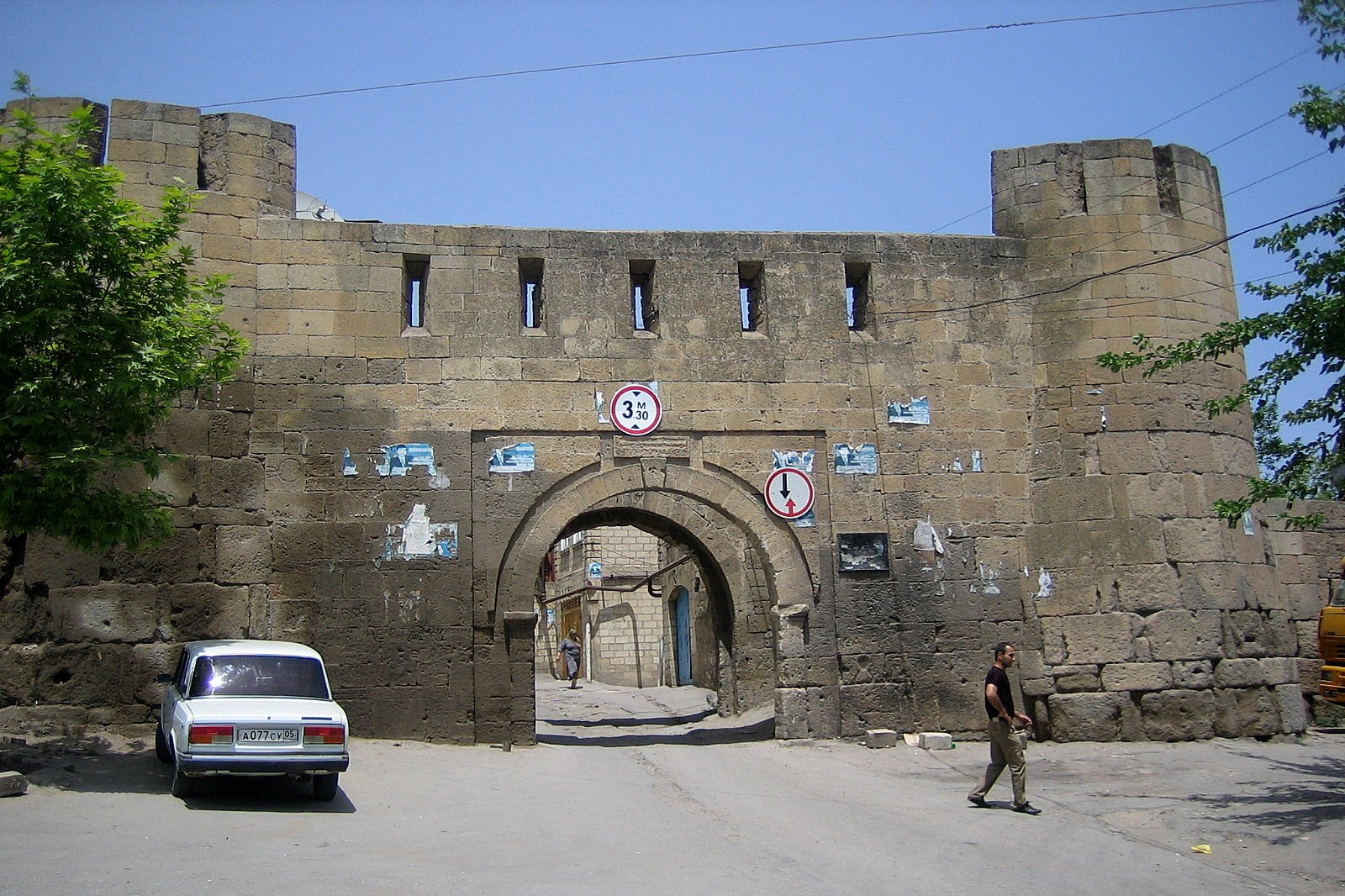
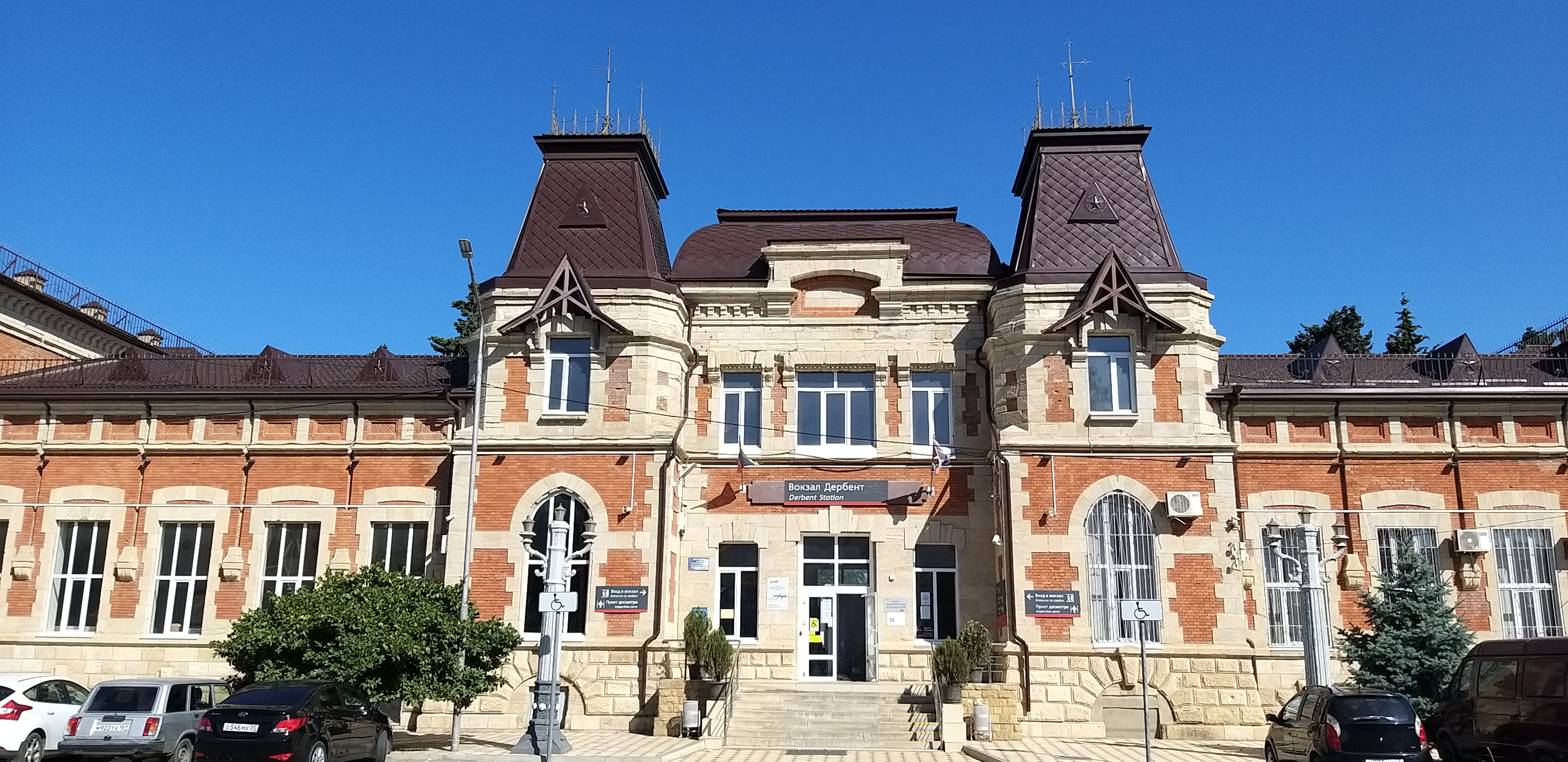
- Derbent skyline Juma Mosque Kyrkhlyar Holy Saviour Church Naryn-Kala Derbent railway station

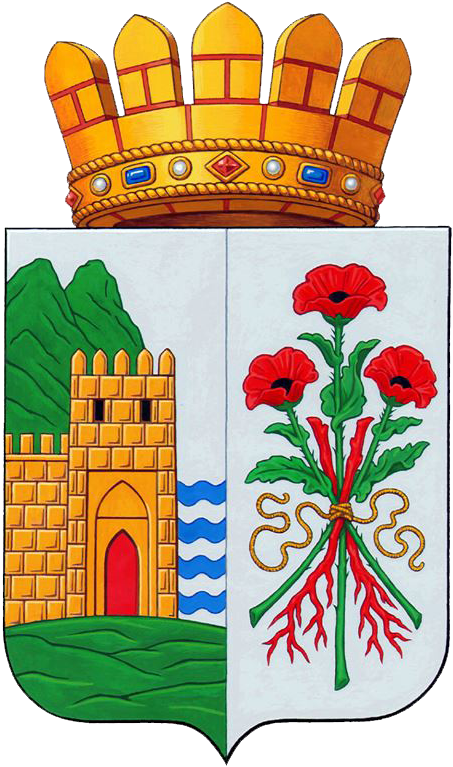
- Coat of arms
- Interactive map of Derbent
- Location of Derbent in Dagestan Location of Derbent in European Russia Location of Derbent in Russia Location of Derbent in Europe
- Coordinates: 42°03′28″N 48°17′20″E
- Country: Russia
- Federal subject: Dagestan
- Founded: 438
- City status since: 1840

Government
  - Mayor: Akhmed Abduseinovich Kuliev

Area
  - Total: 69.63 km^{2} (26.88 sq mi)
- Elevation: 0 m (0 ft)

Population (2010 Census)
  - Total: 119,200
  - Estimate (2024): 127,084 (+6.6%)
  - Rank: 137th in 2010
  - Density: 1,712/km^{2} (4,434/sq mi)

Administrative status
  - Subordinated to: City of Derbent
  - Capital of: City of Derbent, Derbentsky District

Municipal status
  - Urban okrug: Derbent Urban Okrug
  - Capital of: Derbent Urban Okrug, Derbentsky Municipal District
- Time zone: UTC+3 (MSK)
- Postal code: 368600
- Dialing code: +7 87240
- OKTMO ID: 82710000001
- Website: www.derbent.org

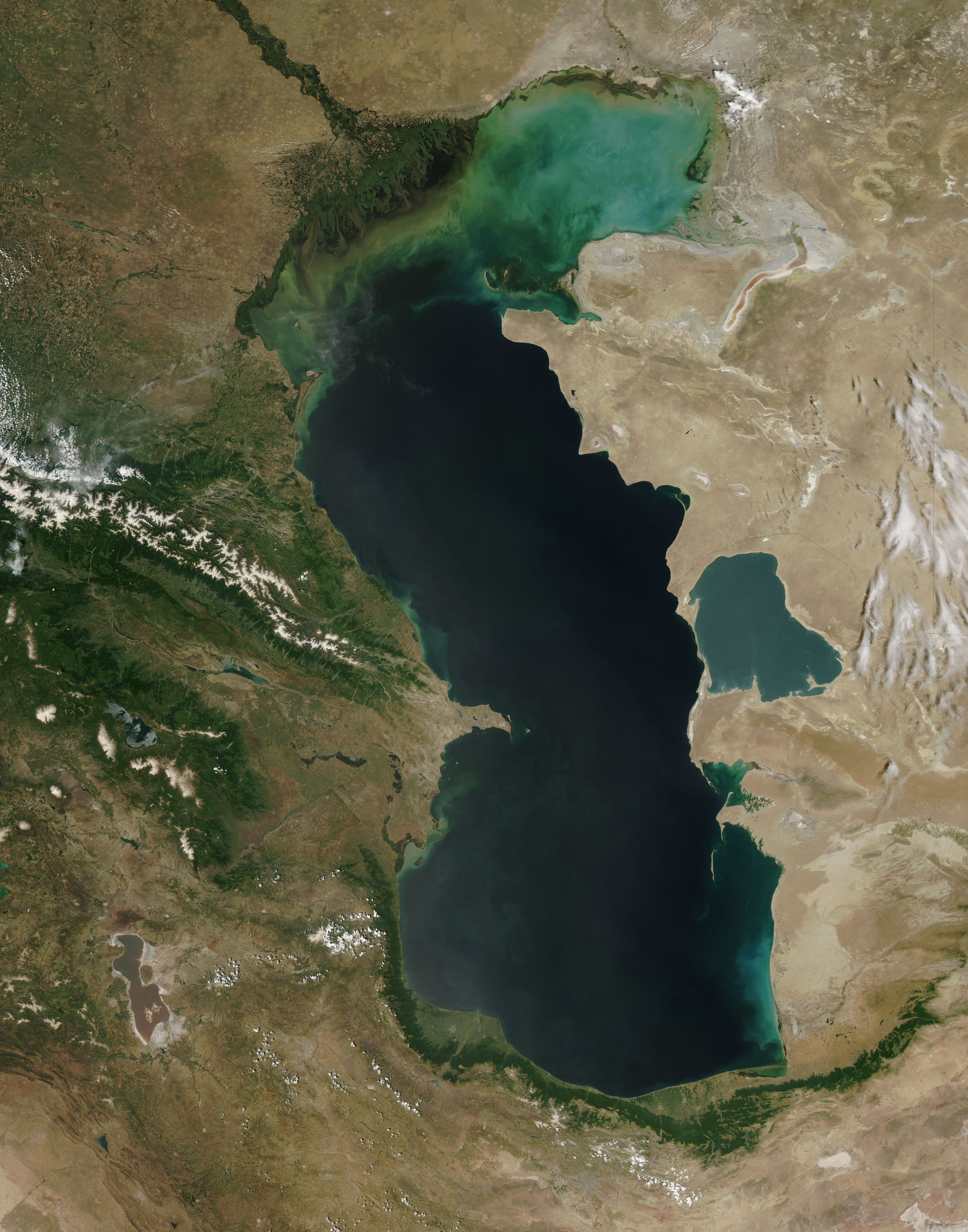
Derbent is at the foot of the snow-capped Caucasus Mountains, seen here in a photo taken by the MODIS on the orbiting Terra satellite, June 2003

Derbent, (Note: (Russian: Дербе́нт; Lezgian: Цал, Кьвевар, Дербент, romanized: Tsal, Kwevar, Derbent; Avar: Дербенд; Azerbaijani: Дәрбәнд, romanized: Dərbənd; Rutul: Derbend; all deriving from Persian: دربند, romanized: Darband)) known as Albana until the 3rd century, as Chor until the 6th century, as Bab al-Abwab until the 12th century, and also as Darband, or Derbend, is a city in Dagestan, Russia. It is the southernmost city in Russia, occupying the narrow gateway between the Caspian Sea and the Caucasus Mountains, and connecting the Eurasian Steppe to the north and the Iranian Plateau to the south. Derbent covers an area of 69.63 square kilometres (26.88 mi^{2}) with a population of roughly 128,141 residents.

Derbent is considered the oldest city in Russia, with historical documentation dating to the 8th century BC, making it one of the oldest continuously inhabited cities in the world. Due to its strategic location, over the course of history, the city changed ownership many times, particularly among the Persian, Arab, Mongol, Timurid, and Shirvan kingdoms. In the early 19th century, the city came under control of the Russian Empire through the Treaty of Gulistan signed with Qajar Iran.

== Etymology ==
Derbent is derived from Persian "Darband" (Persian: دربند, lit. 'door/opening in a barrier', from dar "door/gate" + band "barrier/dam", lit., "gate in the barrier"), referring to the eastern-most pass in the high Caucasus Mountains (whence the putative "barrier/dam") on the beaches of the Caspian Sea. (The other pass, the Darial Pass, is in the Central Caucasus Mountains, and likewise carries a Persian name, standing for "the Alan Pass/gate" – with the Alans being the modern Iranic Ossetians.)

It is often identified with the Gates of Alexander, a legendary barrier supposedly built by Alexander the Great in the Caucasus. The Persian name for the city came into use at the end of the 5th or the beginning of the 6th century AD, when the city was re-established by Kavad I of the Sasanian dynasty of Persia, but Derbent was probably already in the Sasanian sphere of influence as a result of the victory over the Parthians and the conquest of Caucasian Albania by Shapur I, the second shah of the Sasanian Empire. The geographical treatise Šahrestānīhā ī Ērānšahr written in Middle Persian mentions the old name of the fortress – Wērōy-pahr (The Georgian Guard):

šahrestan [ī] kūmīs [ī] panj-burg až-i dahāg pad šabestān kard. māniš [ī] *pārsīgān ānōh būd. padxwadayīh [ī] yazdgird ī šabuhrān kard andar tāzišn ī čōl wērōy-pahr [ī] an ālag. (The city of Kūmīs of five towers Aži Dahag made it his own harem. The abode of the Parthians was there. In the reign of Yazdgird, the son of Šabuhr made it during the invasion of the Čōl, at the boundary of the Georgian Guard.).

-Wėrōy-pahr: "The Georgian Guard" The old name of the fortress at Darband;...

In Arabic texts the city was known as "Bāb al-Abwāb" (Arabic: بَاب ٱلْأَبْوَاب, lit. 'Gate of all Gates'), simply as "al-Bāb" (Arabic: ٱلْبَاب, lit. 'The Gate') or as "Bāb al-Ḥadīd" (Arabic: بَاب ٱلْحَدِيد, lit. 'Gate of Iron'). A similar name meaning "Iron Gate" was used by Turkic peoples, in the form "Demirkapi".

== History ==
Derbent's location on a narrow, three-kilometer strip of land in the North Caucasus between the Caspian Sea and the Caucasus Mountains is strategic in the entire Caucasus region. Historically, this position allowed the rulers of Derbent to control land traffic between the Eurasian Steppe and West Asia. The only other practicable crossing of the Caucasus ridge was over the Darial Gorge.

=== Persian rule ===
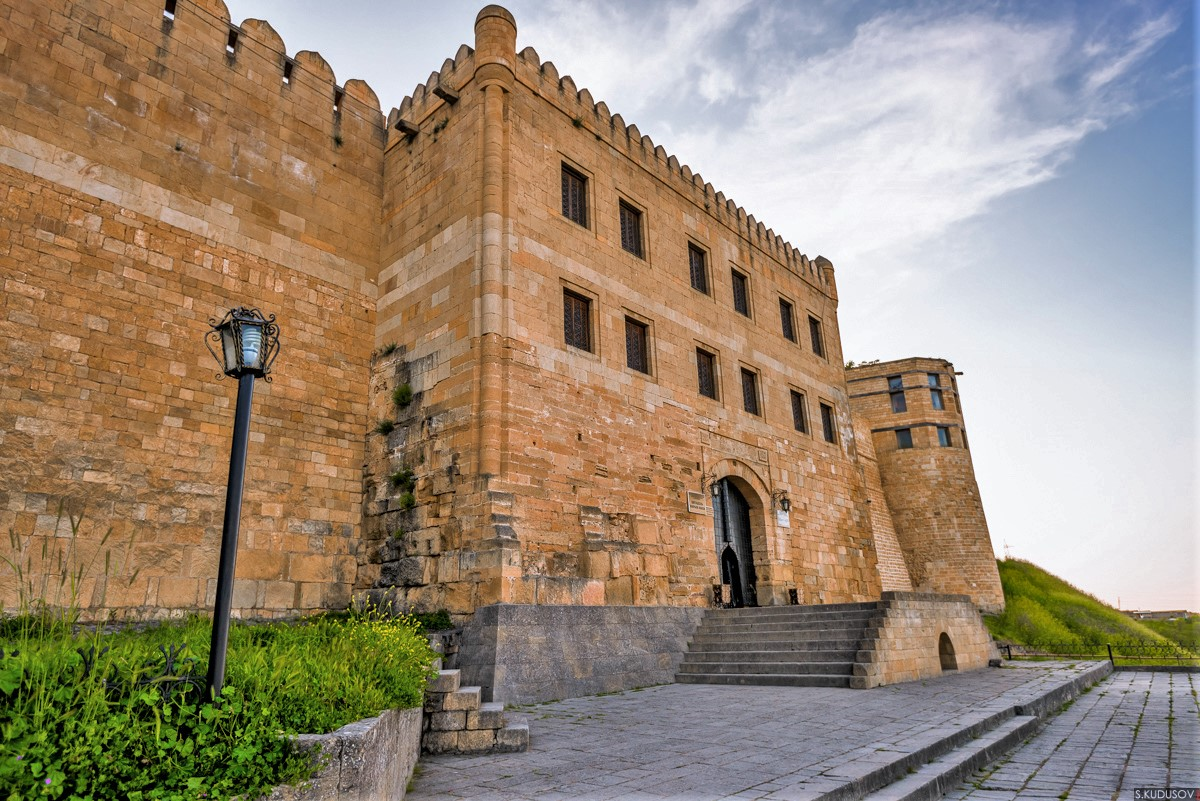
Derbent is renowned for its Medieval fortress, Naryn-Kala, a UNESCO World Heritage Site.

A traditionally and historically Iranian city, the first intensive settlement in the Derbent area dates from the 8th century BC; the site was intermittently controlled by the Persian monarchs, starting from the 6th century BC. Until the 4th century AD, it was part of Caucasian Albania which was a satrapy of the Persian Achaemenid Empire, and is traditionally identified with Albana, the capital. The modern name is a Persian word (دربند Darband) meaning "gateway", which came into use in the end of the 5th or the beginning of the 6th century AD, when the city was re-established by Kavad I of the Sassanid dynasty of Persia, however, Derbent was probably already into the Sasanian sphere of influence as a result of the victory over the Parthians and the conquest of Caucasian Albania by Shapur I, the second shah of the Sassanid Persians. In the 5th century Derbent also functioned as a border fortress and the seat of a Sassanid marzban.

The 20-meter-high (66 ft) walls with thirty north-looking towers are believed to belong to the time of Kavadh's son, Khosrow I, who also directed the construction of Derbent's fortress.

Some say that the level of the Caspian was formerly higher and that the lowering of the water level opened an invasion route that had to be fortified. The chronicler Movses Kaghankatvatsi wrote about "the wondrous walls, for whose construction the Persian kings exhausted our country, recruiting architects and collecting building materials with a view of constructing a great edifice stretching between the Caucasus Mountains and the Great Eastern Sea". Derbent became a strong military outpost and harbour of the Sasanian Empire. During the 5th and 6th centuries, Derbent also became an important center for spreading the Christian faith in the Caucasus.

During periods when the Sasanians were distracted by war with the Byzantines or protracted battles with the Hephthalites in the eastern provinces, the northern tribes succeeded in advancing into the Caucasus. The first Sasanian attempt to seal off the road along the Caspian seacoast at Darband by means of a mud-brick wall has been dated in the reign of Yazdegerd II (r. 438–457 AD).

Movses Kagankatvatsi left a graphic description of the sack of Derbent by the hordes of Tong Yabghu of the Western Turkic Khaganate in 627. His successor,

As mentioned by the Encyclopedia Iranica, ancient Iranian language elements were absorbed into the everyday speech of the population of Dagestan and Derbent especially during the Sassanian era, and many remain current. In fact, a deliberate policy of “Persianizing” Derbent and the eastern Caucasus, in general, can be traced over many centuries, from Khosrow I to the Safavid shahs Ismail I, and ʿAbbās the Great. According to the account in the later "Darband-nāma", after construction of the fortifications Khosrow I “moved much folk here from Persia”, relocating about 3,000 families from the interior of Persia in the city of Derbent and neighboring villages. This account seems to be corroborated by the Spanish Arab Ḥamīd Moḥammad Ḡarnāṭī, who reported in 1130 that Derbent was populated by many ethnic groups, including a large Persian-speaking population.

=== Arab conquest ===
In 643, Derbent was captured by the Arab Muslims, who called it the Gate of Gates (Bab al-Abwab), following their invasion of Persia. They transformed it into an important administrative center and introduced Islam to the area. The impression of antiquity evoked by these fortifications led many Arab historians to connect them with Khosrow I and to include them among the seven wonders of the world. The Darband fortress was certainly the most prominent Sasanian defensive construction in the Caucasus and could have been erected only by an extremely powerful central government. Because of its strategic position on the northern branch of the Silk Route, the fortress was contested by the Khazars in the course of the Khazar-Arab Wars.

The Sassanids had also brought Armenians from Syunik to help protect the pass from invaders; as Arab rule weakened in the region at the end of the ninth century, the Armenians living there were able to establish a community, which lasted until the early years of the 13th century. The Holy Saviour Armenian Church still rises up in the skyline, though it is used as the Museum of Carpet, Arts and Crafts today due to the decline in the Armenian population. There was also a second Armenian church and two Armenian schools which served the Armenian community, which numbered about 3,000 in the census of 1913.

Excavations on the eastern side of the Caspian Sea, opposite to Derbent, revealed the Great Wall of Gorgan, the eastern counterpart to the wall and fortifications of Derbent. Similar Sassanian defensive fortifications there—massive forts, garrison towns, long walls—also run from the sea to the mountains.

The Caliph Harun al-Rashid lived in Derbent and brought it into great repute as a seat of the arts and commerce. According to Arab historians, Derbent, with a population exceeding 50,000, was the largest city of the 9th century in the Caucasus. In the 10th century, with the collapse of the Arab Caliphate, Derbent became the capital of an emirate. Emirate of Derbent often fought losing wars with the neighboring Christian state of Sarir, allowing Sarir to manipulate Derbent's politics on occasion. Despite that, the emirate outlived its rival and continued to flourish at the time of the Mongol invasion in 1239. In the 14th century, Derbent was occupied by Timur's armies.

=== Shirvanshah era ===
The Shirvanshahs dynasty existed as independent or a vassal state, from 861 until 1538; longer than any other dynasty in the Islamic world. They were renowned for their cultural achievements and geopolitical pursuits. The rulers of Shirvan, called the Shirvanshahs, had attempted, and on numerous times, succeeded, to conquer Derbend since the 18th Shirvanshah king, Afridun I, was appointed as the governor of the city. Over the centuries the city changed hands often. The 21st Shirvanshah king, Akhsitan I, briefly reconquered the city. However, the city was lost once again to the northern Kipchaks.

After the Timurid invasion, Ibrahim I of Shirvan, the 33rd Shirvanshah, managed to keep the kingdom of Shirvan independent. Ibrahim I revived Shirvan's fortunes, and through his cunning politics managed to continue without paying tribute. Furthermore, Ibrahim also greatly increased the limits of his state. He conquered the city of Derbend in 1437. The Shirvanshahs integrated the city so closely with their political structure that a new branch of the Shirvan dynasty emerged from Derbend, the Derbenid dynasty. The Derbenid dynasty, being a cadet dynasty of Shirvan, inherited the throne of Shirvan in the 15th century.

In the early 16th century, the kingdom of Shirvan was conquered by Shah Ismail of the Safavid dynasty. As Shah Ismail incorporated all the Shirvan possessions, he also inherited Derbend.

=== Russian conquest ===
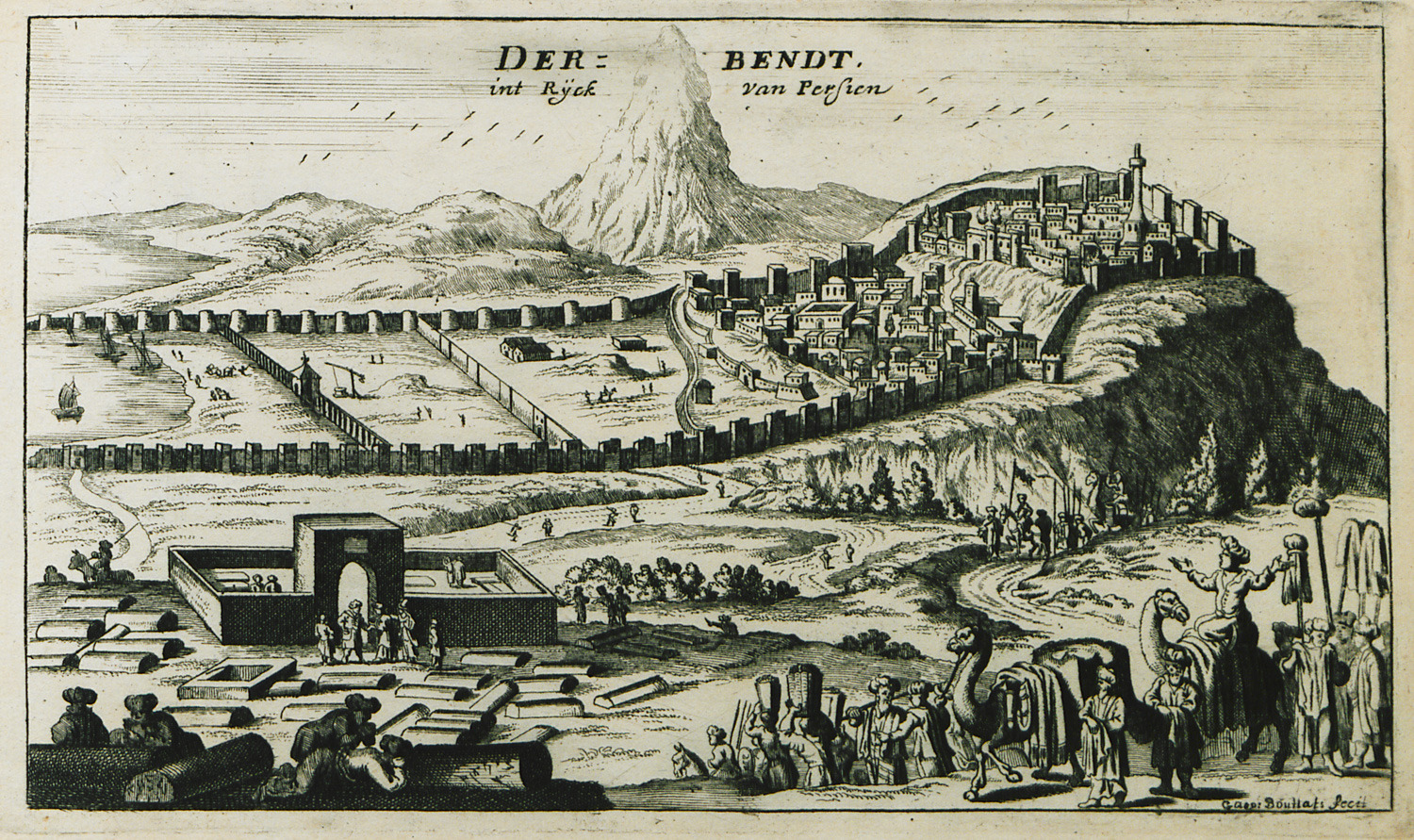
Illustration entitled Derbendt int rÿck van Persien ("Derbent in the Persian Empire"). Published by Jacob Peeters in 1690

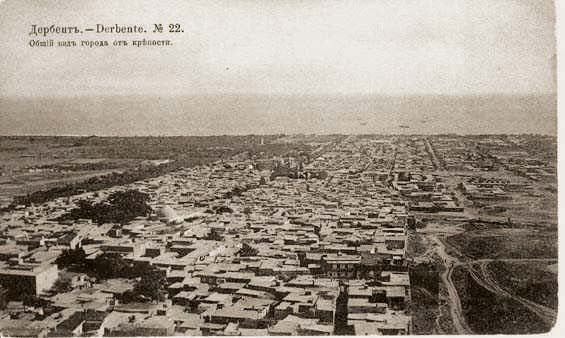
View of the city from the citadel of Naryn-Kala, 1910s

Derbent stayed under Iranian rule, while occasionally briefly taken by the Ottoman Turks such as in 1583 after the Battle of Torches and the Treaty of Constantinople, till the course of the 19th century, when the Russians occupied the city and wider Iranian-ruled swaths of Dagestan.

Being briefly taken by the Russians as a result of the Persian expedition of 1722–23 by Peter the Great, the 1735 Treaty of Ganja, formed by Imperial Russia and Safavid Iran (de facto ruled by Nader Shah), forced Russia to return Derbent and its bastion to Iran. In 1747, Derbent became the capital of the Derbent Khanate of the same name.

During the Persian Expedition of 1796, Derbent was stormed by Russian forces under General Valerian Zubov, but the Russians were forced to retreat due to internal political issues, making it fall under Persian rule again. As a consequence of the Russo-Persian War (1804-1813) and the resulting Treaty of Gulistan of 1813, Derbent and wider Dagestan were ceded by Qajar Iran to the Russian Empire. (For background, see Russian conquest of the Caucasus#Caspian Coast.)

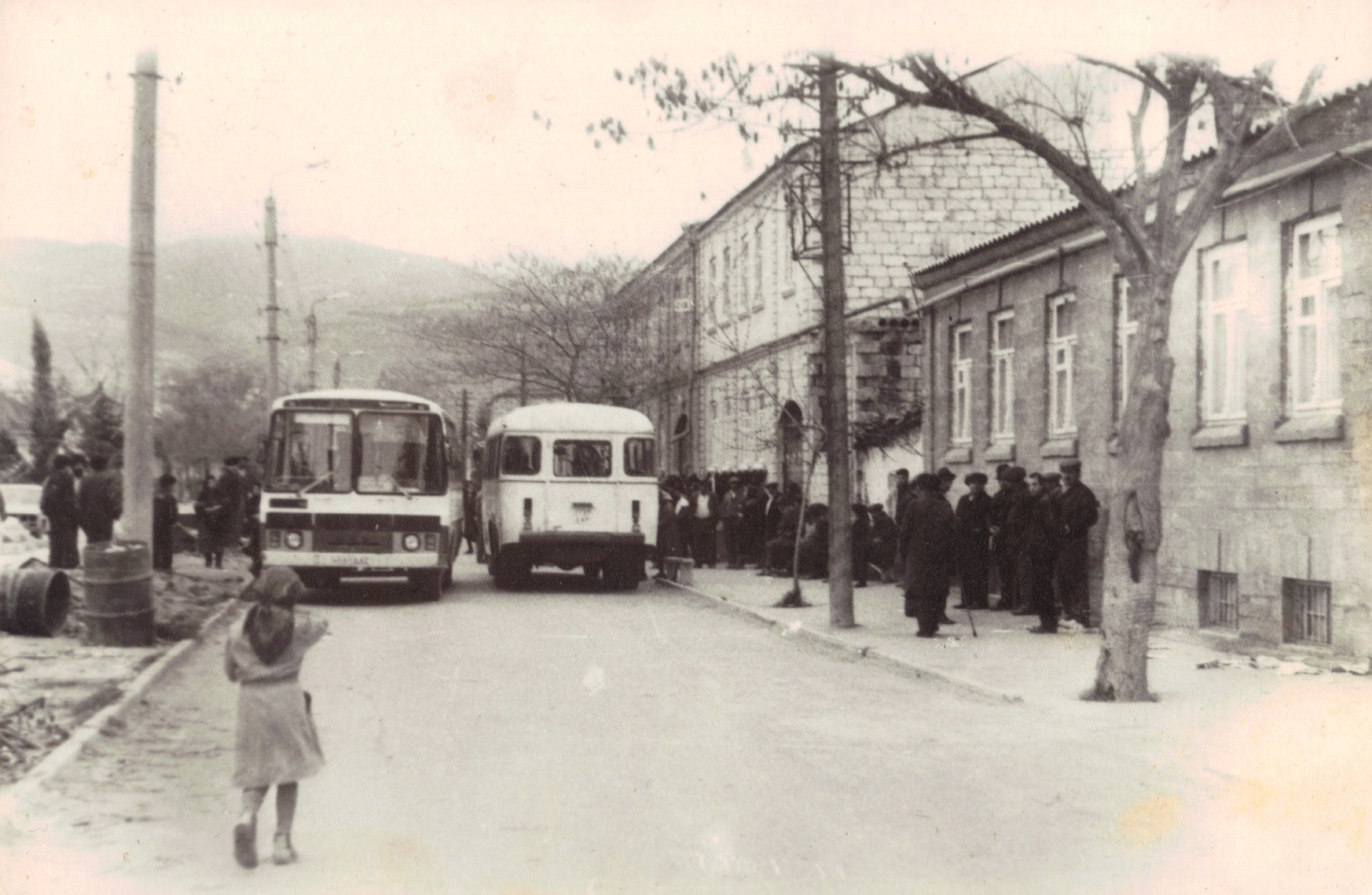
Derbent in the 1980s

In the 1886 census of Dagestan Oblast, as part of Russia's Caucasus Viceroyalty, people of Iranian descent (Russian: персы) were still an absolute majority at 8,994 out of 15,265, or 58,9%.

== Geography ==
The modern city is built in the North Caucasus of Eastern Europe; near the western shores of the Caspian Sea, south of the Rubas River, on the slopes of the Tabasaran Mountains (part of the Bigger Caucasus range). Derbent is well served by public transport, with its own harbor, a railway going south to Baku, and the Baku to Rostov-on-Don road.

To the north of the town is the monument of the Kirk-lar, or forty heroes, who fell defending Dagestan against the Arabs in 728. To the south lies the seaward extremity of the Caucasian wall (fifty metres long), otherwise known as Alexander's Wall, blocking the narrow pass of the Iron Gate or Caspian Gates (Portae Athanae or Portae Caspiae). When intact, the wall had a height of 9 m (29 ft) and a thickness of about 3 m (10 ft) and, with its iron gates and numerous watch-towers, defended Persia's frontier.

=== Climate ===
Derbent has a cool semi-arid climate (Köppen BSk). Winters are highly variable, with very cold nights interspersed with occasional bouts of sunshine and summerlike temperatures. The highest recorded temperature is 38.8 °C or 101.8 °F on August 29, 1995 and August 13, 1974 and the lowest −19.0 °C or −2.2 °F on February 14, 1988 and February 3, 1994. The highest minimum temperature is 28.9 °C or 84.0 °F on July 6, 1990, July 12, 2010 and June 7, 1984, and the lowest maximum −6.1 °C or 21.0 °F on January 15, 1993 and December 7, 2005.

Climate data for Derbent
Month	Jan	Feb	Mar	Apr	May	Jun	Jul	Aug	Sep	Oct	Nov	Dec	Year
Record high °C (°F)	26.7 (80.1)	26.6 (79.9)	28.3 (82.9)	30.1 (86.2)	34.2 (93.6)	35.3 (95.5)	35.8 (96.4)	38.8 (101.8)	33.0 (91.4)	28.0 (82.4)	28.0 (82.4)	27.6 (81.7)	38.8 (101.8)
Mean daily maximum °C (°F)	4.8 (40.6)	4.7 (40.5)	7.4 (45.3)	13.6 (56.5)	20.0 (68.0)	25.4 (77.7)	28.4 (83.1)	28.2 (82.8)	23.7 (74.7)	17.5 (63.5)	11.7 (53.1)	7.2 (45.0)	16.1 (61.0)
Daily mean °C (°F)	2.1 (35.8)	2.0 (35.6)	4.5 (40.1)	10.1 (50.2)	16.3 (61.3)	21.7 (71.1)	24.9 (76.8)	24.6 (76.3)	20.2 (68.4)	14.3 (57.7)	8.9 (48.0)	4.5 (40.1)	12.9 (55.2)
Mean daily minimum °C (°F)	−0.2 (31.6)	−0.2 (31.6)	2.2 (36.0)	7.1 (44.8)	12.8 (55.0)	17.9 (64.2)	21.2 (70.2)	21.0 (69.8)	16.9 (62.4)	11.4 (52.5)	6.4 (43.5)	2.3 (36.1)	10.0 (50.0)
Record low °C (°F)	−18.9 (−2.0)	−19.0 (−2.2)	−9.1 (15.6)	−3.1 (26.4)	4.1 (39.4)	8.5 (47.3)	12.9 (55.2)	10.7 (51.3)	5.1 (41.2)	−3.4 (25.9)	−9.7 (14.5)	−14.2 (6.4)	−19.0 (−2.2)
Average precipitation mm (inches)	30.7 (1.21)	31.6 (1.24)	23.4 (0.92)	20.9 (0.82)	22.9 (0.90)	18.7 (0.74)	18.9 (0.74)	24.8 (0.98)	47.0 (1.85)	52.2 (2.06)	48.5 (1.91)	39.9 (1.57)	379.5 (14.94)
Average precipitation days	11.0	10.9	8.7	6.1	5.9	5.8	4.9	5.2	7.3	9.3	10.6	11.2	96.8
Mean monthly sunshine hours	72	73	102	158	227	260	275	248	193	133	86	67	1,894
Source: climatebase.ru

== Administrative and municipal status ==
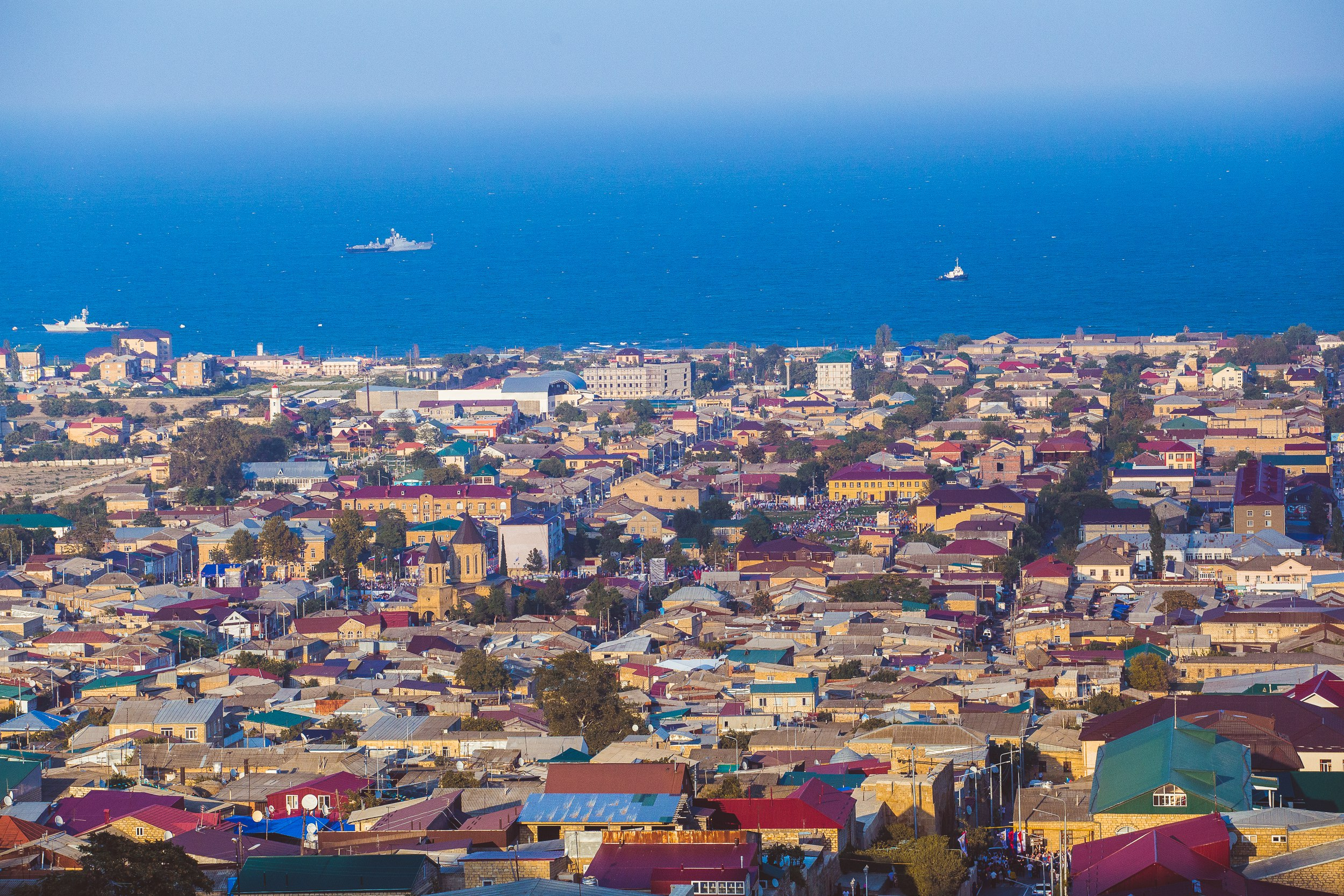
Derbent

Within the framework of administrative divisions, Derbent serves as the administrative center of Derbentsky District, even though it is not a part of it. As an administrative division, it is incorporated separately as the City of Derbent—an administrative unit with the status equal to that of the districts. As a municipal division, the City of Derbent is incorporated as Derbent Urban Okrug.

== Education ==
The city has the following educational institutions: the "Yuzhdag Institute", three vocational schools, three colleges, one branch campus of a college, 26 schools, and 28 kindergartens.

- Derbent Medical College
- Derbent Music College

== Demographics ==
Historical population
Year	Pop.	±%
1897	14,649	—
1926	23,100	+57.7%
1939	34,100	+47.6%
1959	47,318	+38.8%
1970	57,192	+20.9%
1979	69,575	+21.7%
1989	78,371	+12.6%
2002	101,031	+28.9%
2010	119,200	+18.0%
2021	124,953	+4.8%
Source: Census data

In 1886, the ethnic make-up was 58,9% "Persian" (Iraniс Tats were classified as Persians), 16,8% Jewish (Mountain Jews), 10,2% Russian and 7,7% "Tatar" (Turkic Azeris were classified as Tatars).

In 1897, the ethnic make-up, by mother tongue, was 66.7% "Tatar" (Azeris were classified as Tatars in the census), 14.9% Jewish, 6.9% Russian, 4.2% Armenian, 1.9% Avar, 1.1% Polish, and 1.0% Lithuanian.

In 1916, Derbent had a population of 31,168 consisting of 7,919 Shia Muslims (25.4%), 7,567 Russians (24.3%), 6,879 Jews (22.1%), 5,138 Caucasian highlanders (16.5%), 2,604 Armenians (8.4%), and 1,061 Sunni Muslims (3.4%).

In the 1913–1914 edition of Everyman's Encyclopaedia, Derbent is mentioned as the cultural center of the Lezgins.

According to the 2021 Census, the main ethnic groups in the city are:

- Lezgins (36.4%)
- Azerbaijanis (35.1%)
- Tabasarans (12.2%)
- Dargins (5.0%)
- Russians (3.0%)
- Aghuls (3.0%)
- Rutuls (0.8%)

=== Jewish community ===
Jews began to settle in Derbent in ancient times. During the Khazars' reign, they played an important part in the life of the city. The Jewish traveler Benjamin of Tudela mentions Jews living in Derbent in the 12th century, and Christian traveler William of Rubruck writes about a Jewish community in the 13th century. The first mention of Jews in Derbent in modern times is by a German traveler, Adam Olearius, in the 17th century.

Derbent's Jewry suffered during the wars in the 18th century. Nadir Shah of Persia forced many Jews to adopt Islam. After the Russian conquest, many Jews of rural Dagestan fled to Derbent, which became the spiritual center of the Mountain Jews. The Jewish population numbered 2,200 in 1897 (15% of total population) and 3,500 in 1903. In the middle of the 20th century, Jews constituted about a third of the population of Derbent. In 1989, there were 13,000 Jews in the city, but most emigrated after the dissolution of the Soviet Union. In 2002, there were 2,000 Jews with an active synagogue and community center. The chief rabbi of Derbent, Obadiah Isakov, was badly injured in an assassination attempt on July 25, 2013, sparking concerns of further acts of antisemitism targeting the Jewish community. In 2016, the Jewish population was down to 1,345. In the 2024 Dagestan attacks, a synagogue in Derbent was set on fire by armed gunmen, possibly affiliated with ISIS.

== Economy and culture ==
The city is home to machine building, food, textile, fishing, and fishery supplies, construction materials, and wood industries. It is the center of Russian brandy production. The educational infrastructure includes a university as well as several technical schools. On the cultural front, there is a Lezgin drama theater (named after S. Stalsky). About two kilometers (1.2 miles) from the city is the vacation colony of Chayka (Seagull).

The Soviet novelist Yury Krymov named a fictional motor tanker after the city in his book The Tanker "Derbent".

=== Museums ===
- Derbent State Museum-Reserve
- Cabin of Peter the Great
- Alexander Bestuzhev House

=== Theaters ===
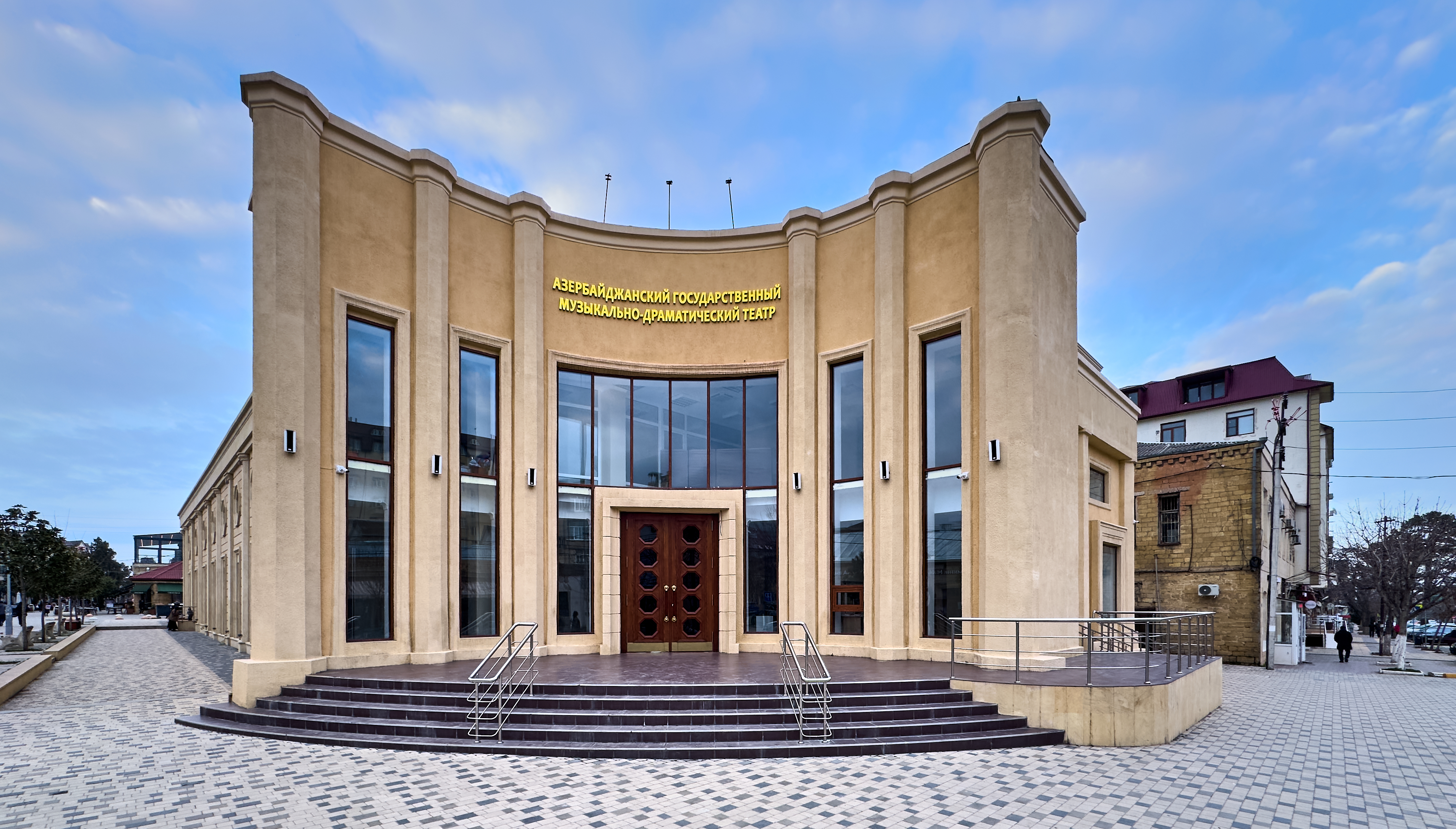
Azerbaijani Drama Theatre

Derbent has 3 state and 1 municipal theaters.

- Azerbaijani Drama Theatre
- Lezgian Musical and Drama Theatre
- State Tabasaran Drama Theater
- Judeo-Tat Theatre

=== Citadel of Derbend ===
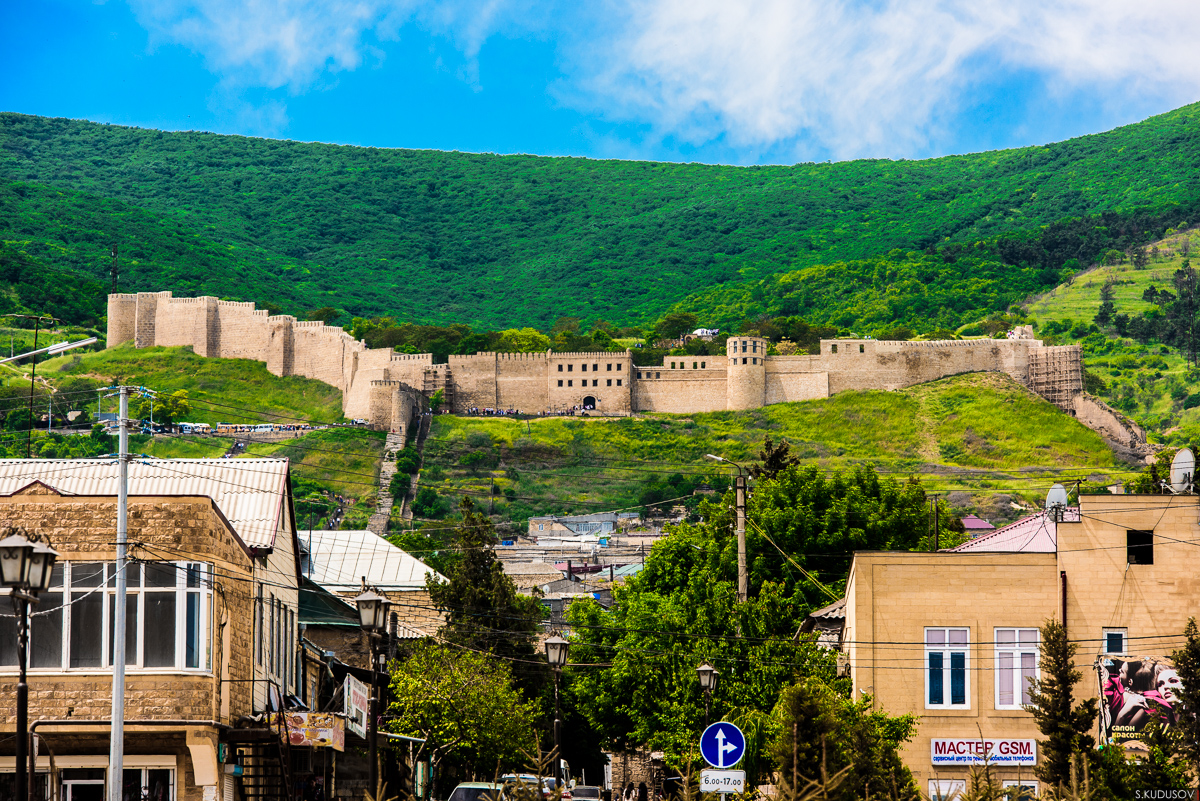
Sassanid Fortress Naryn-Kala (Derbent)

Derbent resembles a huge museum and has magnificent mountains and shore nearby, and therefore possesses much touristic potential, further increased by UNESCO's classification of the citadel, ancient city and fortress as a World Heritage Site in 2003; however, instability in the region has halted development.

The current fortification and walls were built by the Persian Sasanian Empire as a defensive structure against hostile nomadic people in the north, and continuously repaired or improved by later Arab, Mongol, Timurid, Shirvan, and Iranian kingdoms until the early course of the 19th century, as long as its military function lasted. The fortress was built under the direction of the Sasanian emperor Khosrow I.

A large portion of the walls and several watchtowers still remain in reasonable shape. The walls, reaching to the sea, date from the 6th century, Sasanian era. The city has a well-preserved citadel (Narin-kala), enclosing an area of 4.5 hectares (11 acres), enclosed by strong walls. Historical attractions include the baths, the cisterns, the old cemeteries, the caravanserai, the 18th-century Khan's mausoleum, as well as several mosques.

=== Religious monuments ===
As of 1865, the city had: 1 - Russian and 1 - Armenian church; 1 - Sunni and 16 - Shiite mosques, as well as 3 synagogues.

=== Mosques ===
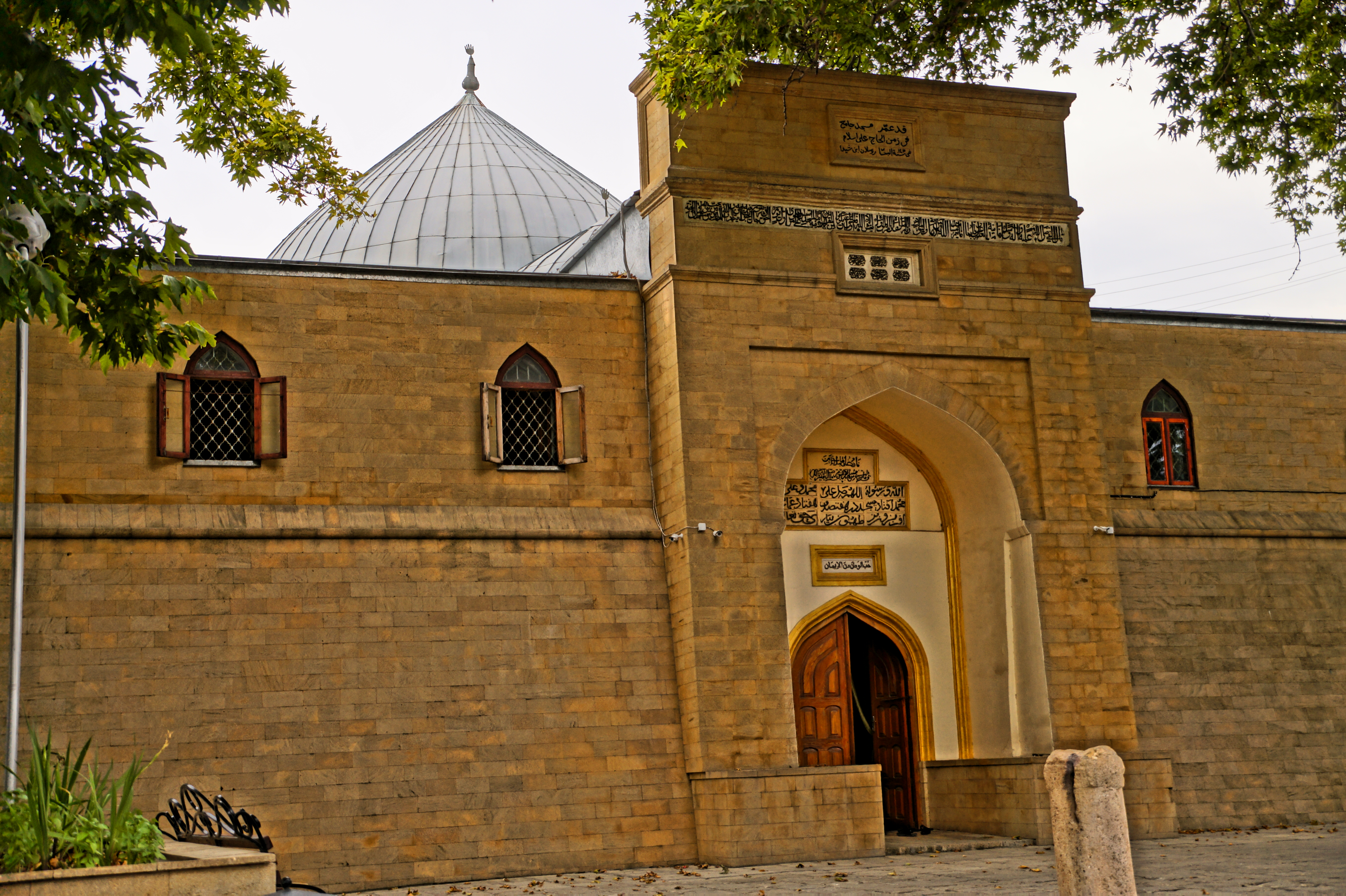
Juma Mosque

- Juma Mosque is the oldest mosque in Russia and the CIS. Built over a 6th-century Christian basilica; it has a 15th-century madrasa.
- Bala-mosque is a mosque at the gates of Orta-kapa. In 1796, it was destroyed during the siege of the city by General Zubov. Restored in 1812.
- Kilis-mosque is a mosque. It is located in the 7th district. In 1823–1853 the mosque served as a church. Now it is called Tovba Mesjidi.
- Kyrhlyar-mosque is a mosque at the gates of Kyrhlyar-kapa. Built in 1626–1627 by order of Shah Abbas. Another name is Shah Abbas Mesjidi. Rebuilt several times.
- The Minaret-mosque is the only mosque in the city with a minaret. Construction dates back to the XIII-XIV centuries. Rebuilt in the middle of the 19th century. The minaret is 11.5 meters high.
- Chertebe-mosque is a mosque in 1 mahal. Construction dates back to the 17th century. Rebuilt at the end of the 19th century. Completely demolished in the 1960s.

=== Churches ===
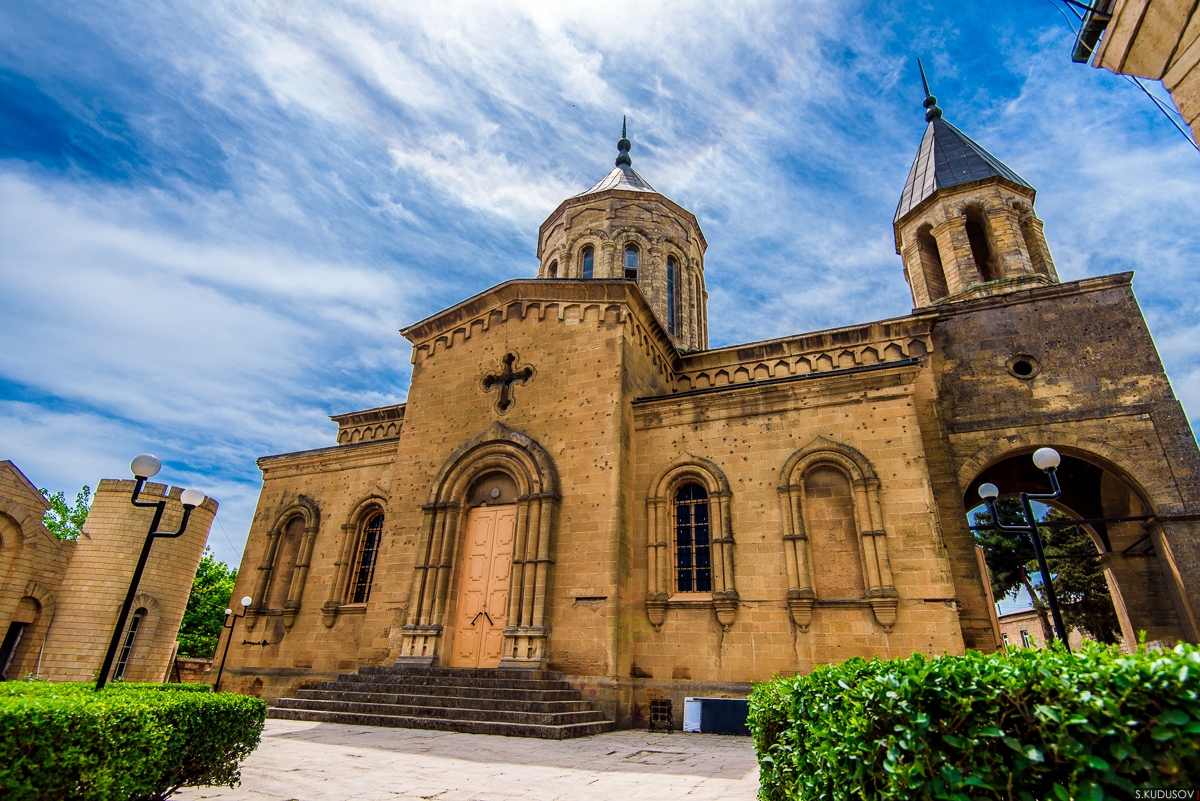
Church of the Holy All-Savior of Derbent

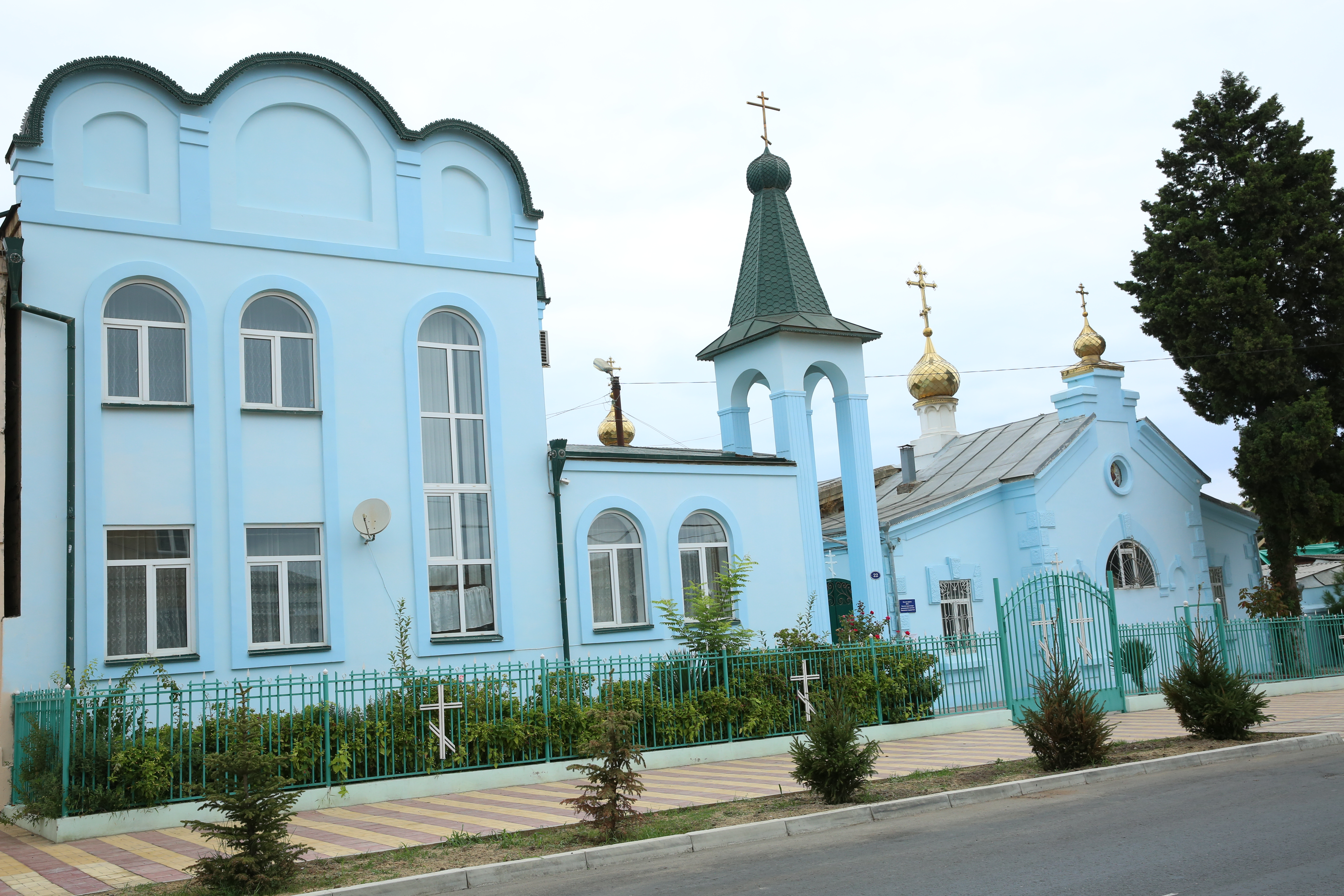
Church of the Intercession of the Holy Virgin of Derbent

- The Armenian Church of the Holy All-Savior is an architectural monument of the 19th century. Built in 1860. After the completion of the overhaul and restoration work, in May 1982, a museum of fine arts (a branch of the republican museum of fine arts) was opened in it. The museum became part of the State Museum-Reserve as a department of "Carpets and arts and crafts".
- Church of the Intercession of the Holy Virgin is an Orthodox church. Built in 1899, opened in 1900.
- Cathedral of St. George the Victorious of Derbent was the main Russian Orthodox Church in the city of Derbent. Demolished in 1938.
- Crossed-dome temple of Derbent is a temple of the 4-7 centuries. It is located in the northwestern part of the citadel Naryn-Kala.

=== Synagogues ===
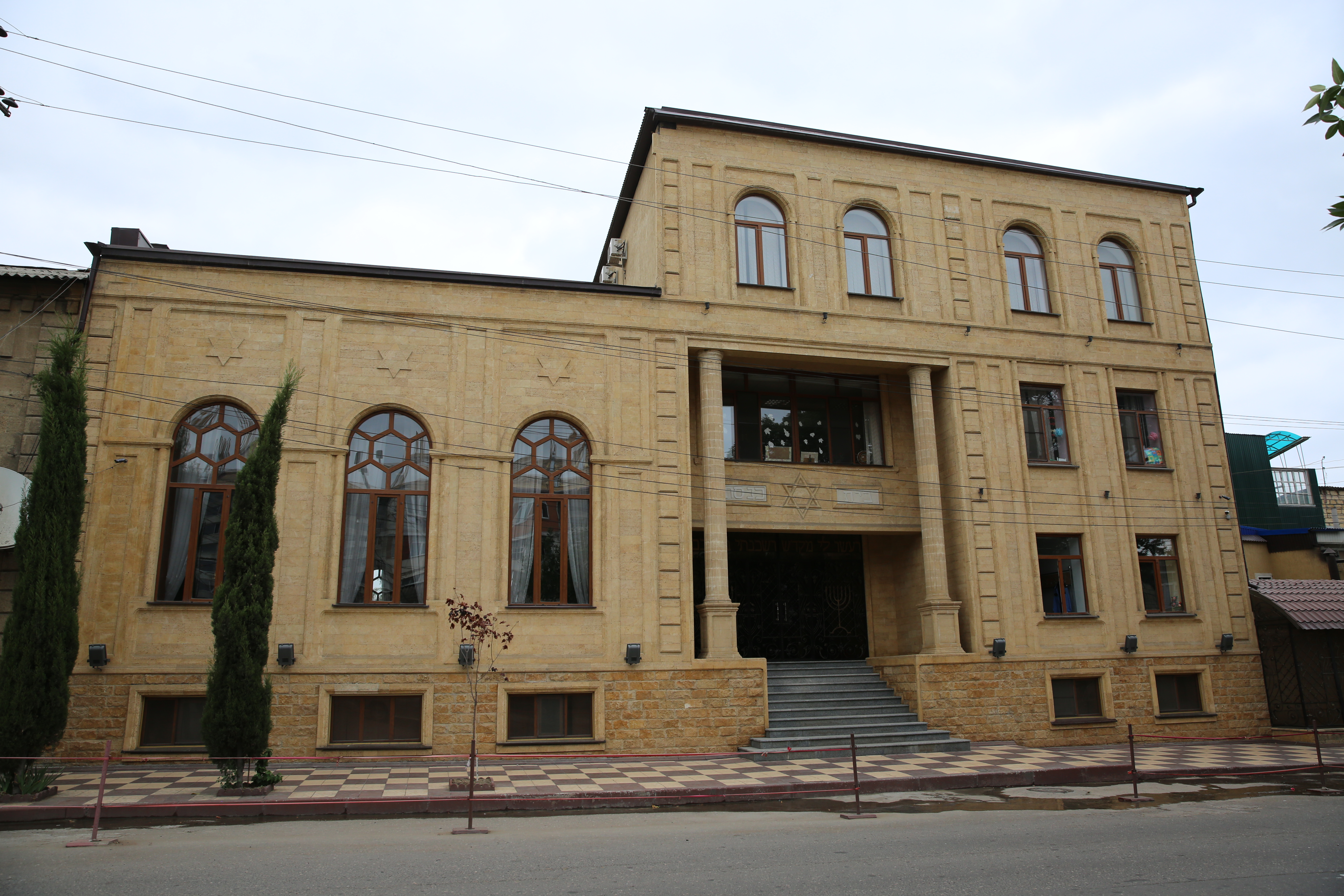
Derbent Synagogue

- The Derbent Synagogue is the only synagogue in the city. The center of the spiritual life of the Jews of Derbent. Built in 1914. In 2009 the synagogue building was reconstructed. It was reopened on March 22, 2010.
- On June 23, 2024, terrorists burned the Jewish synagogue in Derbent.

=== Cemeteries ===
- Kyrkhlyar is an old and revered cemetery established in the 7th century. It is the oldest active Muslim cemetery in Russia. The name means "the forty" and refers to the 40 companions of Muhammad who were killed there in 20 AH (640-641 CE) during the early Muslim expansion.

=== Lighthouse ===
- Derbent Lighthouse is the southernmost lighthouse in Russia. The lighthouse is included in the list of protected monuments of Russia and UNESCO.

== Notable people ==
- Shahriyar of Derbent (7th century), Sasanian commander
- Djumshud Ashurov (1913–1980), composer
- Yuno Avshalumov (1934–1981), conductor, and teacher
- Daniil Atnilov (1913–1968), poet
- Mishi Bakhshiev (1910–1972), writer and poet
- Manuvakh Dadashev (1913–1943), poet
- Mikhail Dadashev (1936), writer
- Musaib Dzhum-Dzhum (1905–1974), theatre director
- Boris Gavrilov (1908–1990), writer and poet
- Mikhail Gavrilov (1926–2014), writer and poet
- Raziil Ilyaguev (1944–2016), stage actor and artistic director
- Sergey Izgiyayev (1922–1972), poet, playwright, and translator
- Mozol Izrailova (born 1955), actress
- Suleyman Kerimov (born 1966), businessman, investor, and politician
- Nikolay Kotelnikov (1955–2024), abbot, priest and murder victim
- Lev Manakhimov (1950–2021), theatre director
- Bikel Matatova (1928–2013), actress
- Ekhiil Matatov (1888–1943), a Soviet statesman
- Yagutil Mishiev (1927–2024), writer
- Mushail Mushailov (1941–2007), artist and teacher
- Tamara Musakhanov (1924–2014), sculptor and ceramist
- Bella Nisan (born ca.1957), ophthalmologist
- Asaf Pinkhasov (1884–1920), educator, scholar, translator
- Konstantin Saradzhev, (1877-1954), conductor and violinist
- Zoya Semenduev (1929–2020), poet
- Yuno Semyonov (1899–1961), writer, playwright and artistic director
- Akhso Shalumova (1909–1985), actress
- Israel Tsvaygenbaum (born 1961), artist
- Igor Yusufov (born 1956), politician

== Twin towns – sister cities ==
Derbent is twinned with:

- Ganja, Azerbaijan
- Yakima, United States
- Hadera, Israel
- Kronstadt, Russia
