= Derbent State Museum-Reserve =

Museum in Derbent, Dagestan, Russia

Derbent State Historical, Architectural and Archaeological Museum-Reserve
- «Дербентский музей-заповедник»
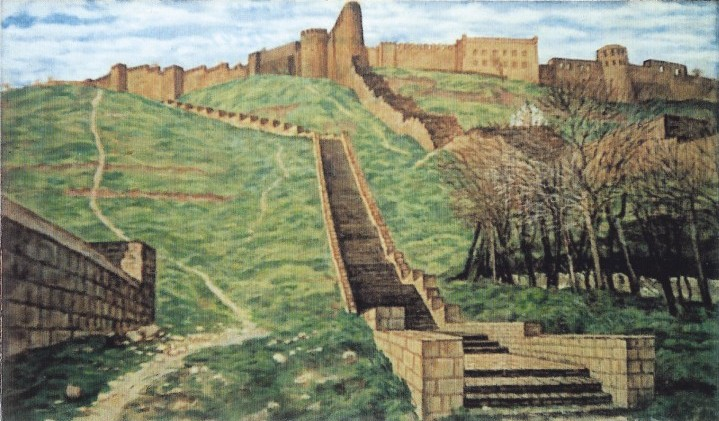
- The Derbent fortress "Naryn-Kala"
- Established: May 11, 1988
- Location: Derbent, Dagestan, Russia
- Coordinates: 42.0572°N 48.2867°E
- Website: https://derbentmuseum.ru/

The Derbent State Historical, Architectural and Archaeological Museum-Reserve (Russian: Дербентский музей-заповедник) is a museum complex dedicated to the history of Derbent, the most ancient city in Russia. The territory of the museum reserve, together with the protected zones, is 2044 hectares, and it contains more than 250 (and according to some estimates, more than 400) historical and cultural monuments. The territory of the museum complex contains 25 monuments of federal significance, including the Naryn-Kala citadel. In 2003, it was included in the UNESCO World Heritage List.

== History of Creation ==
- The Derbent Museum of Local History was founded in 1926. Its founder was Pyotr Ivanovich Spassky, a chemistry teacher at Derbent School No. 1, who was passionate about local history.
- On May 5, 1928, the Presidium of the Dagestan Central Executive Committee decided to "take under special protection all the ancient monuments of Derbent, such as: the citadel, the wall along its entire length, the Kyrkhlyar cemetery in its entirety, outstanding monuments in other cemeteries, the dugout of Peter the Great, the house where the poet Alexander Bestuzhev-Marlinsky lived, etc."
- In 1934, the museum received municipal status.
- On October 5, 1954, the Department of Culture of the city of Derbent appointed Yagutil Mishiev as Director of the Local History Museum, a position he held until February 25, 1969. During his many years as museum director, Mishiev traveled throughout the Derbent district collecting unique materials and information related to the city’s history.
- In 1960, the Derbent Scientific Restoration Workshops were created, and since 1971 the museum has been conducting systematic archaeological research.
- In 1977, the museum was transformed into a historical and architectural museum.
- On May 11, 1988, by Decree No. 86, the Derbent State Historical, Architectural and Art Museum-Reserve was created under the Ministry of Culture of the Republic of Dagestan.
- On August 13, 2020, by the Decree of the Government of the Republic of Dagestan, the museum was renamed into "Derbent State Historical, Architectural and Archaeological Museum-Reserve."
- In 2003, the Naryn-Kala citadel, the ancient city, including the 8th-century Juma Mosque, the oldest mosque in Russia, and the fortifications of Derbent were added to the UNESCO World Heritage List as outstanding monuments of the Sasanian Empire and subsequent cultures.

== Structure ==
=== Museums ===
- The Architectural complex citadel "Naryn-Kala"

The stone walls of the fortress were built in the 6th century. On the territory there are architectural monuments reflecting different periods of Derbent's development: the Khan's Chancellery (Commandant's House, Divan-Khan) of the 18th century, the Khan's Palace of the 18th century, the Guardhouse (1828) (which houses the art gallery "History of Derbent in Paintings"), rectangular and cross-shaped reservoirs (6th-18th centuries), a cross-domed church (4th-18th centuries), the Khan's Bathhouse (18th-18th centuries), an underground prison – zindan.

- The Museum of Carpet, Decorative and Applied Arts.

It is in the Armenian-Gregorian temple, an architectural monument of the 19th century, built in 1860 according to the design of Gabriel Sundukian. The museum exhibits authentic works of folk decorative and applied art. It was opened in 1982. In addition to carpets, the exhibition presents ceramic and metal products.

- The Memorial House Museum of A. A. Bestuzhev-Marlinsky

It was opened on October 12, 1988, in the house where the exiled writer and Decembrist A. Bestuzhev-Marlinsky lived in 1830–1834. The house is in the upper part of the city and is typical of Derbent architecture of the late 18th - early 19th centuries. It was bought for the museum back in 1941, but due to the outbreak of World War II, the museum was not opened then. The exhibition reflects the Derbent period of the writer's life and work. The house recreates the furnishings of that time, including the use of authentic items that served Bestuzhev.

- The Museum of Military Glory

It opened in 1991. In 2015, a complete re-exposition took place. The museum presents a permanent exhibition "Military Glory of Derbent Residents", as well as sections dedicated to the Soviet–Afghan and Chechen–Russian wars.

- The Museum "Nature of the Caspian Sea"

It was founded in 1993. The museum presents the flora and fauna of Southern Dagestan, both the inhabitants of the land and the underwater world of the Caspian Sea, including endangered species.

- The Museum of Culture and Life of Ancient Derbent

It has been operating since 1992 in the building of the “Maiden Bathhouse”

=== Structural planning zones ===
- Naryn-Kala fortress
- Upper "mahallah" city
- Lower "European" city
- Territory of ancient cemeteries
- Ancient harbor of Derbent, adjacent coastal strip and part of the Caspian Sea water area
- Landscape-archaeological zone "Old Damascus"
- Three-kilometer strip along the ancient wall of Dagh-Bary from Naryn-Kala fortress to the Old Fortress on the Dzhalgan ridge, 500 meters wide.

=== Monuments of federal significance ===
- The Derbent Historical, Architectural and Art Museum-Reserve

Cultural heritage site № 0500000153

- The Citadel "Naryn-Kala"

Cultural heritage site № 0510052000

- The North Wall

Cultural heritage site № 0510053000

- The South Wall

Cultural heritage site № 0510054000

- The Bala Mosque

Cultural heritage site № 0510071000

- The Juma Mosque

Cultural heritage site № 0510060000

- The Mosque With a Minaret

Cultural heritage site № 0510059000

- The Kyrkhlyar Mosque

Cultural heritage site № 0510061000

- The Kilis Mosque

Cultural heritage site № 0510056000

- The Ancient Oriental Bath for Men

Cultural heritage site № 0510057000

- The Ancient Oriental Bath for Women

Cultural heritage site № 0510062000

- The Maiden Bath

Cultural heritage site № 0510072000

- Two Underground Reservoirs

Cultural heritage site № 0510058000
Cultural heritage site № 0510070000

- The Jum-Jum Cemetery

Cultural heritage site № 0510064000

- The Kyrkhlyar Cemetery

Cultural heritage site № 0510068000

- The Mausoleum of the Derbent Khans

Cultural heritage site № 0510069000

- The Tomb of Esfendiyar

Cultural heritage site № 0510065000

- The Memorial House Museum of A. A. Bestuzhev-Marlinsky

Cultural heritage site № 0510073000

- The Great Caucasian Wall Dagh-Bary With Castles and Towers

Cultural heritage site № 0510066000

- The Church of the Intercession of the Holy Virgin

Cultural heritage site № 0500002720

- The Armenian-Gregorian Temple

Cultural heritage site № 0510063000

- The Armenian Cemetery

Cultural heritage site № 0510074000

- The Derbent Synagogue

Cultural heritage site № 0500002721

- The Market Square near Kilis Mosque

Cultural heritage site № 0500000151

- The Shekhsalah Spring

Cultural heritage site № 0510067000

- The Derbent Lighthouse

Cultural heritage site № 0500000152

- The Grove and Spring of Peter the Great

Cultural heritage site № 0510055000

== Funds ==
The museum collections contain 8,695 storage units, including 6,425 items in the main collection. The most valuable items include a collection of carpets and rugs (50 storage units), a collection of gold embroidery (10 units), a collection of numismatics and archaeological items (1,500 units), and a collection of copper-embossed tableware (50 units). In total, the collections contain seven museum collections:

- Exhibits made of precious metals and gemstones
- Carpets and rugs, soft inventory
- Numismatics, orders and medals
- Iron, metal; Glass, porcelain, ceramics, stone
- Exhibits on a paper basis
- Art objects.

History, culture, traditions and customs of the peoples of the Caspian region, valuable information about the history of the Caspian Sea, its fauna and flora through household items, ethnography, precious metal products, weapons, photographs, maps, atlases, banknotes, etc.

The numismatic collection contains coins of the 12th-14th centuries found in Derbent because of excavation work. They were minted in the city and belong to the Maliks of Derbent.

There are ceramic vessels of the 12th-14th centuries from Derbent burials, many copper-chased and wooden items produced by Dagestani masters of the 18th-19th centuries, items made of precious metals and precious stones, carpet products, ethnographic and household items dating from the 18th-20th centuries.

== See also ==
- Cabin of Peter the Great
- Alexander Bestuzhev House
