= Naryn-Kala =

Pre-Arab citadel in Derbent, Dagestan, Russia

- Нарын-кала
- Derbent, Dagestan, in Russia
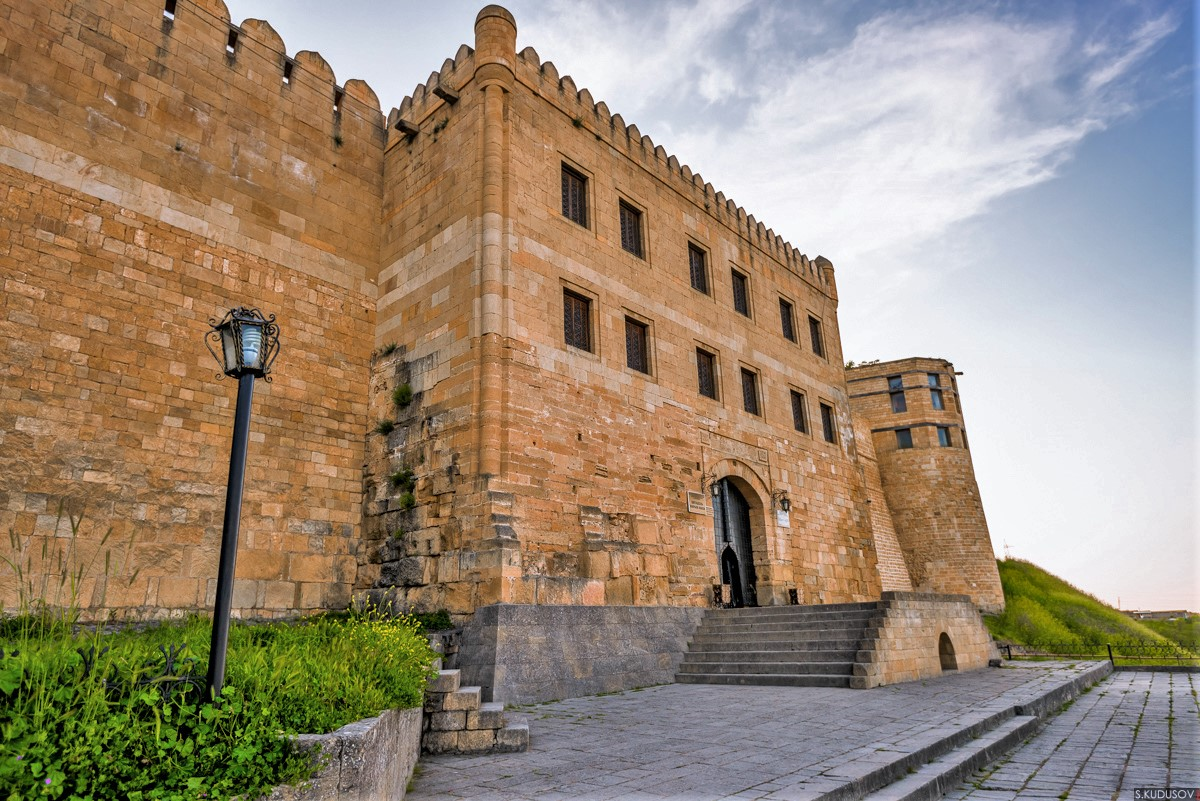
- Citadel Naryn-Kala

Site information
- Type: Citadel
- Open to the public: Open
- Condition: ruined/medium
- Website: https://derbentmuseum.ru/

Location
- Coordinates: 42°03′11″N 48°16′27″E
- Height: 20–25 meters (66–82 ft)
- Length: 255 meters (837 feet)

Site history
- Built: 6th century CE
- Built by: Khosrow I
- In use: Museum
- Materials: Limestone blocks

Garrison information
- Occupants: Derbent Historical, Architectural and Art Museum-Reserve

UNESCO World Heritage Site
- Official name: Citadel, Ancient City and Fortress Buildings of Derbent
- Criteria: Cultural: iii, iv
- Reference: 1070
- Inscription: 2003 (27th Session)
- Endangered: 2003
- Area: 4.5 hectares (11 acres)
- Buffer zone: 2 hectares (4.9 acres)

Naryn-Kala (Russian: Нарын-кала) is an ancient pre-Arab citadel, part of the Derbent fortress, connected to the Caspian Sea by double walls designed to block the so-called Caspian gates to the Persian state. It is included in the UNESCO World Heritage List.

== Etymology ==
One of the translations of the name Naryn-Kala from Middle Persian into Russian is "Sunny Fortress". According to other sources, it got the name Naryn in honor of the daughter of the Persian Shah, which means "tender", "beautiful".

== Description ==
Naryn-Kala citadel occupies the top of the hill closest to the Caspian Sea. The path along the coast was blocked by two parallel fortress walls (the Derbent wall), adjoining the citadel in the west, and leaving the sea at the eastern end, preventing the fortress from being bypassed in shallow water and forming a harbor for ships. Between the walls spaced 350–450 meters apart lay the medieval city of Derbent. To the west of the citadel, the Mountain Wall (Dagh-Bary) stretched for 40 km, designed to prevent bypassing the fortress along mountain valleys and passes. Despite its age, the fortress played an important defensive role for centuries. The new owners rebuilt and updated it, which is why today, as in the annual rings of a tree, one can trace the entire history of Derbent by construction.

The irregularly shaped citadel occupies an area of 4.5 hectares. Dimensions: approximately 180 meters wide and 255 meters long; the walls are fortified with small towers (at a distance of 20–30 meters from each other) and a gun tower in the southwest. The steep slopes of the mountain provide additional protection from three sides.

Inside the citadel there are baths, a fortress water supply system made of ceramic pipes, the ruins of the Shah's palace, a large entrance portal and part of the walls. Opinions about the existence of an early Christian church of the 4th and 5th centuries - the oldest in Russia - are diverse. The cross-domed room is considered by some experts to be a repository; others note the lack of a water conduit at the bottom and the ground—rather than half underground or subterranean—of the structure, consider the form of construction inconvenient for a reservoir, which was generally rectangular or square in Derbent, and they also note the orientation of the structure to the cardinal points. Each wall has three gates, the oldest of which is the Orta Cana (Middle Gate).

Powerful walls with a thickness of 3.5–2.5 meters (11.5–8.2 ft), reaching a height of 20–25 meters (66–82 ft) in some areas, make it an impregnable fortress capable of withstanding a heavy and prolonged siege.

== History ==
Derbent is located in the most strategically vulnerable place of the Caspian Pass, where the Greater Caucasus Mountains are closest to the sea, leaving a single narrow 3 km strip of plain. Derbent Fortress is part of a large defensive system that protected the peoples of Transcaucasia and Western Asia from invasions by nomads from the north. The system included city walls, a citadel, embankments, and the Dagh-Bary mountain wall.

From the west, the Derbent walls adjoin the Naryn-Kala citadel, which was built after the 10th century, since before that a signal fire was kindled at this place when the enemy approached.

The fortress known today was built in the 6th century on the Dzhalgan ridge by order of the Persian ruler Khosrov I Anushirvan (531–579) ("Immortal in Soul") from the Sasanian dynasty.

Since 735, Derbent and Naryn-Kala became the military-administrative center of the Arab Caliphate in Dagestan, as well as the largest trading port and the center of the spread of Islam in this land.

As a result of the Caspian campaign, the city of Derbent became part of the Russian Empire. From the dugout, which is now a local landmark, Emperor Peter the Great moved to the Khan's palace, to whom the beys of Derbent presented the city keys on a silver platter covered with Persian brocade (stored in the Kunstkamera of Saint Petersburg) with words.

In some sources, the Derbent fortress was called the "wall of Alexander the Great" because of the belief in the legend that it was built by the great conqueror. But Alexander the Great was never at the Derbent gates.

During the Persian expedition of 1796, the fortress was retaken by Russian troops under the leadership of General-in-chief Valerian Zubov, who placed the general headquarters in the citadel.

Archaeological excavations are still underway on the territory of Naryn-Kala. Today, Naryn-Kala is included in the UNESCO World Heritage List and is one of the important sights.

== Gallery ==
Citadel

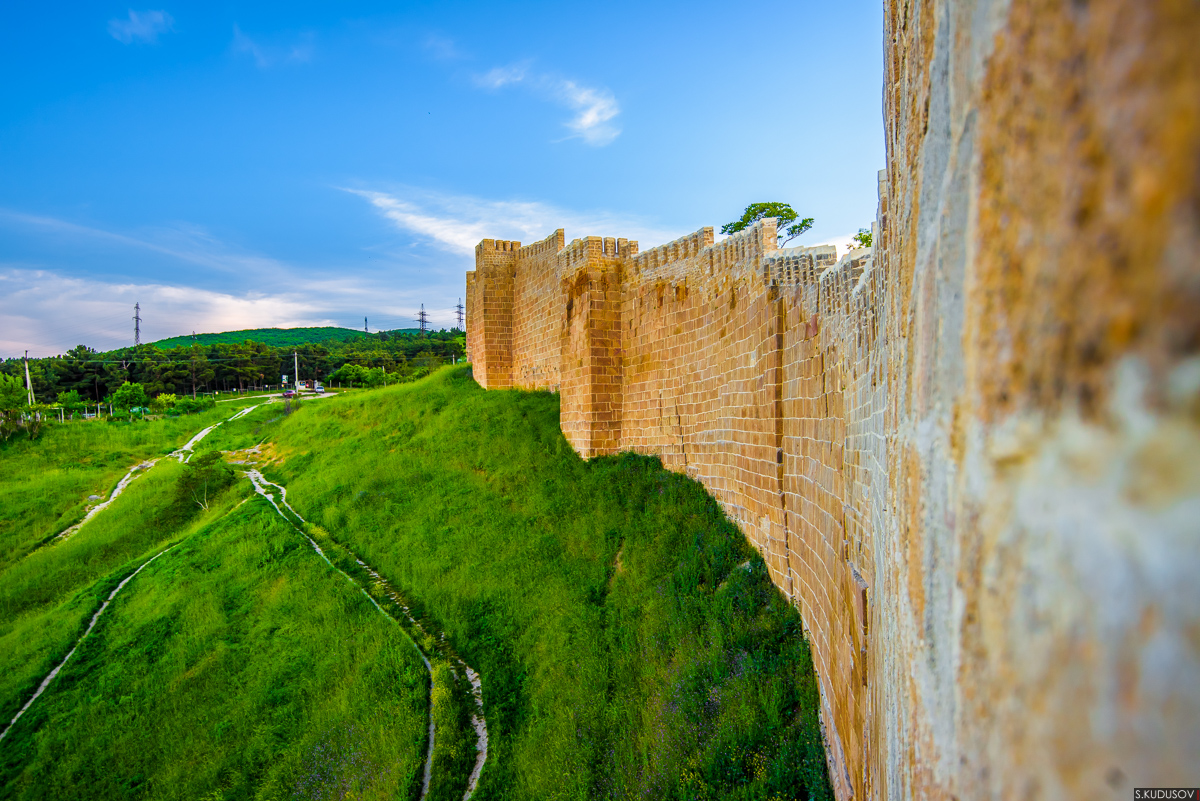
Wall

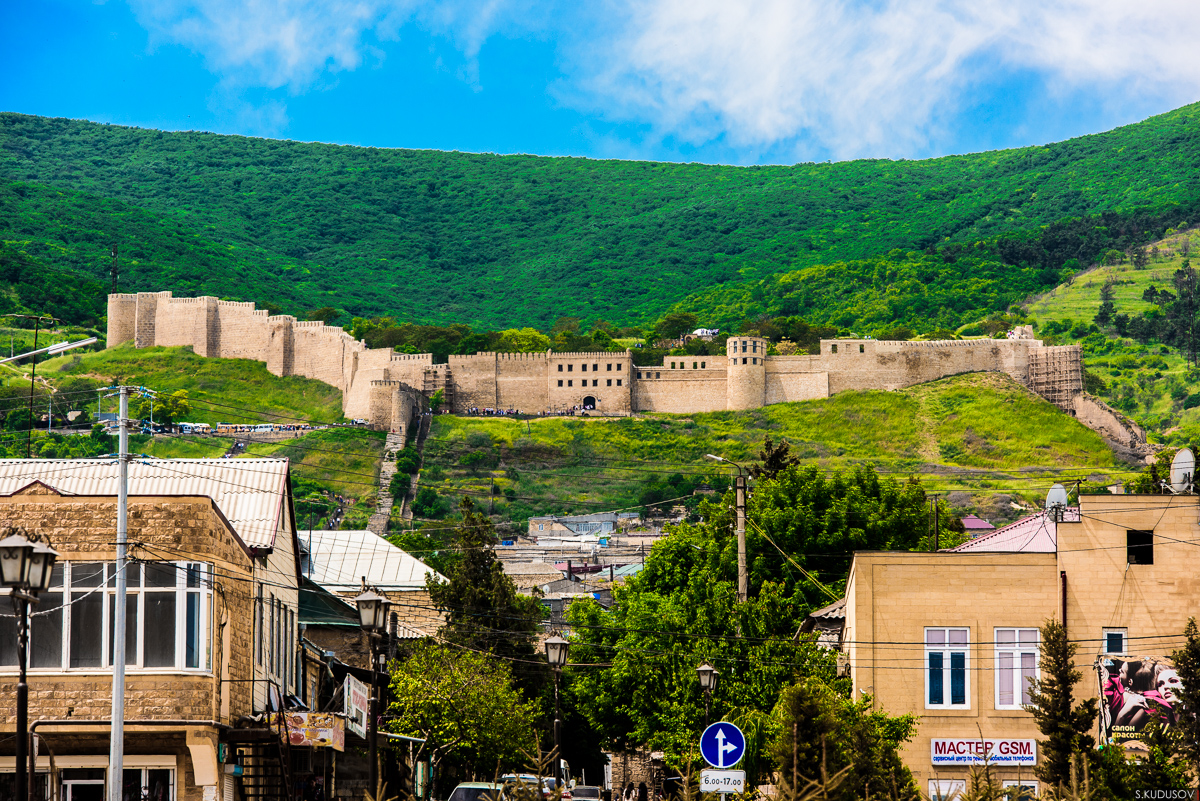
Citadel

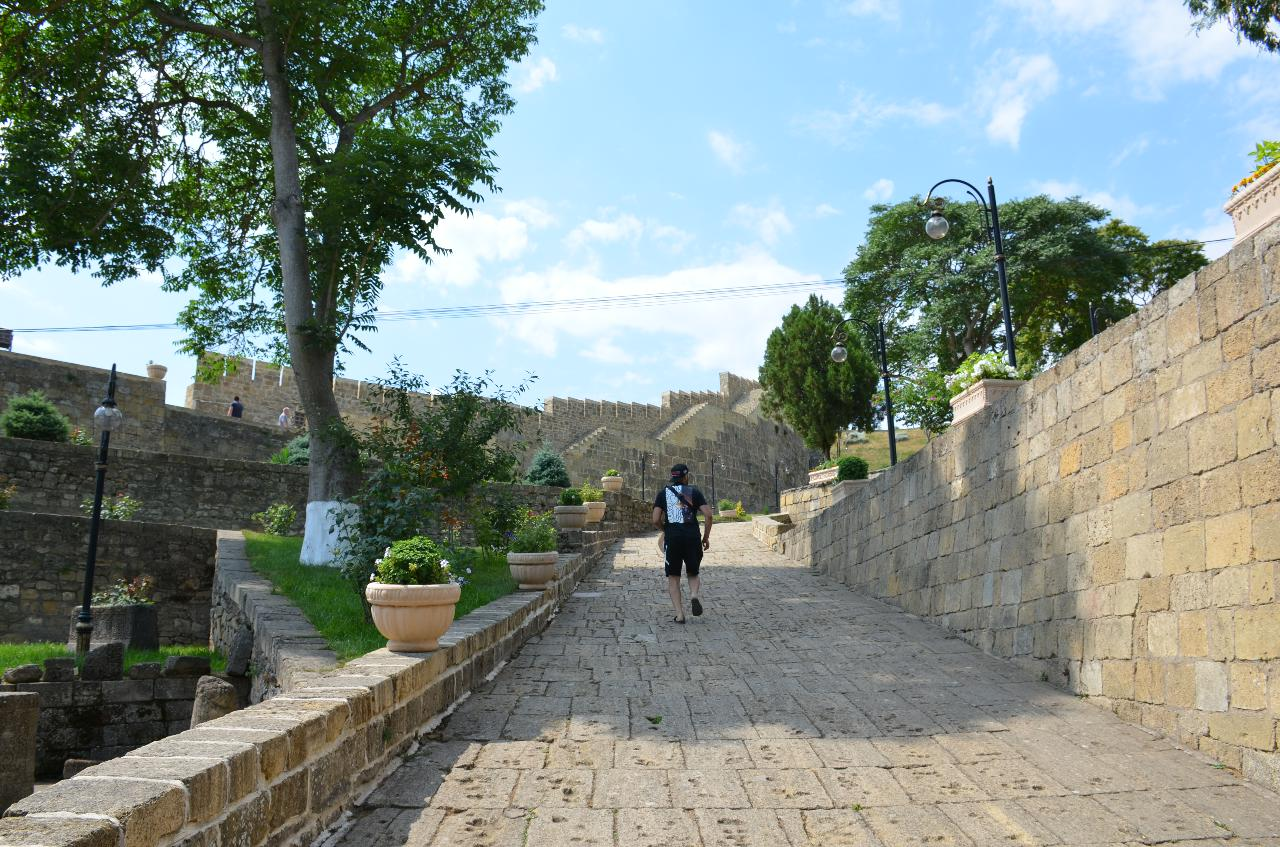
Inside the citadel

== Literature ==
- Bestuzhev-Marlinsky A. A. Letters from Dagestan. Monograph. — M.: Direct-Media, 2011.
- Vagabov M. M., Tyurin R. F. Experience in the use of objects of historical and cultural heritage of the state historical and architectural art museum-reserve "Naryn-Kala" in the educational process // Humanitarian information portal "Knowledge. Understanding. Skill". - 2016. - No. 1 (January - February) (archived at WebCite).
- Kudryavtsev A. A. Ancient Derbent. Monograph. — M.: Nauka, 1982.
- Kudryavtsev A. A. The great city in the Caspian. Derbent in the era of feudalism. Monograph. - Makhachkala: Dagknigoizdat, 1982.
- Kudryavtsev A. A. Derbent is 5000 years old. Monograph. 1989.
- Kudryavtsev A. A. Feudal Derbent. Monograph. 1993.

== See also ==
- Derbent State Museum-Reserve
- Cabin of Peter the Great
- Alexander Bestuzhev House
