= Crossed-dome temple of Derbent =

Church in Derbent, Dagestan, Russia

Crossed-dome temple
- Крестово-купольный храм (Russian)
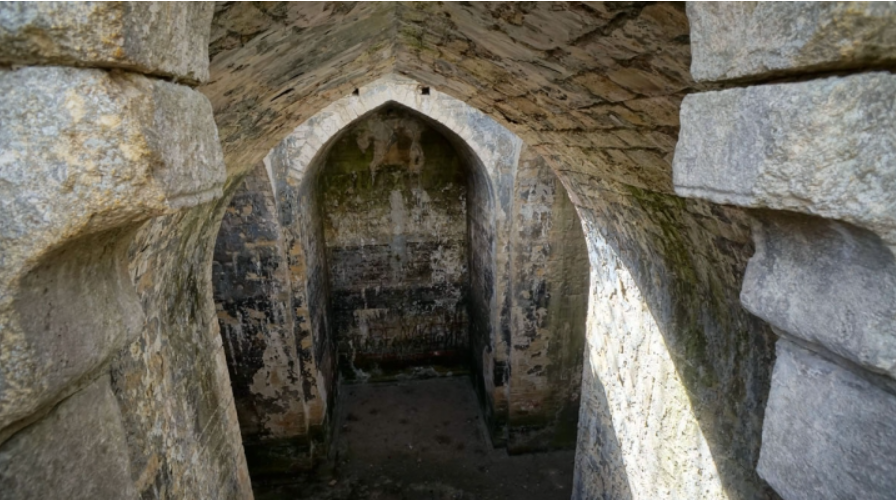
- Crossed-dome temple
- 42°03′10″N 48°16′26″E
- Location: Derbent, Dagestan
- Country: Russia
- Denomination: Christianity

History
- Status: Archaeological excavation
- Founded: 4-7 centuries

Architecture
- Architectural type: Temple
- Style: crossed-dome

Specifications
- Length: 15 metres (49 ft)
- Width: 13 metres (43 ft)
- Height: 10 metres (33 ft)

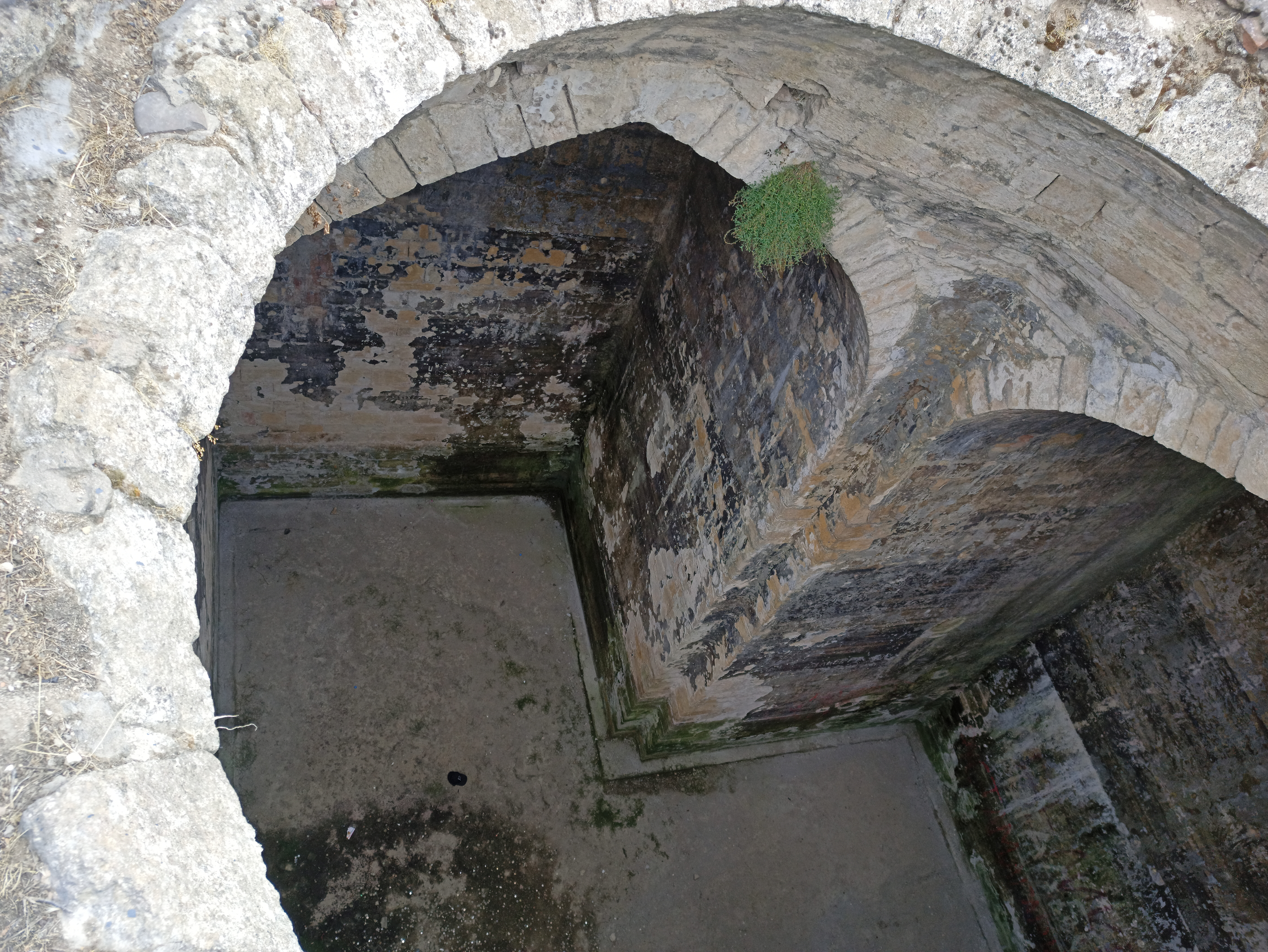
South view

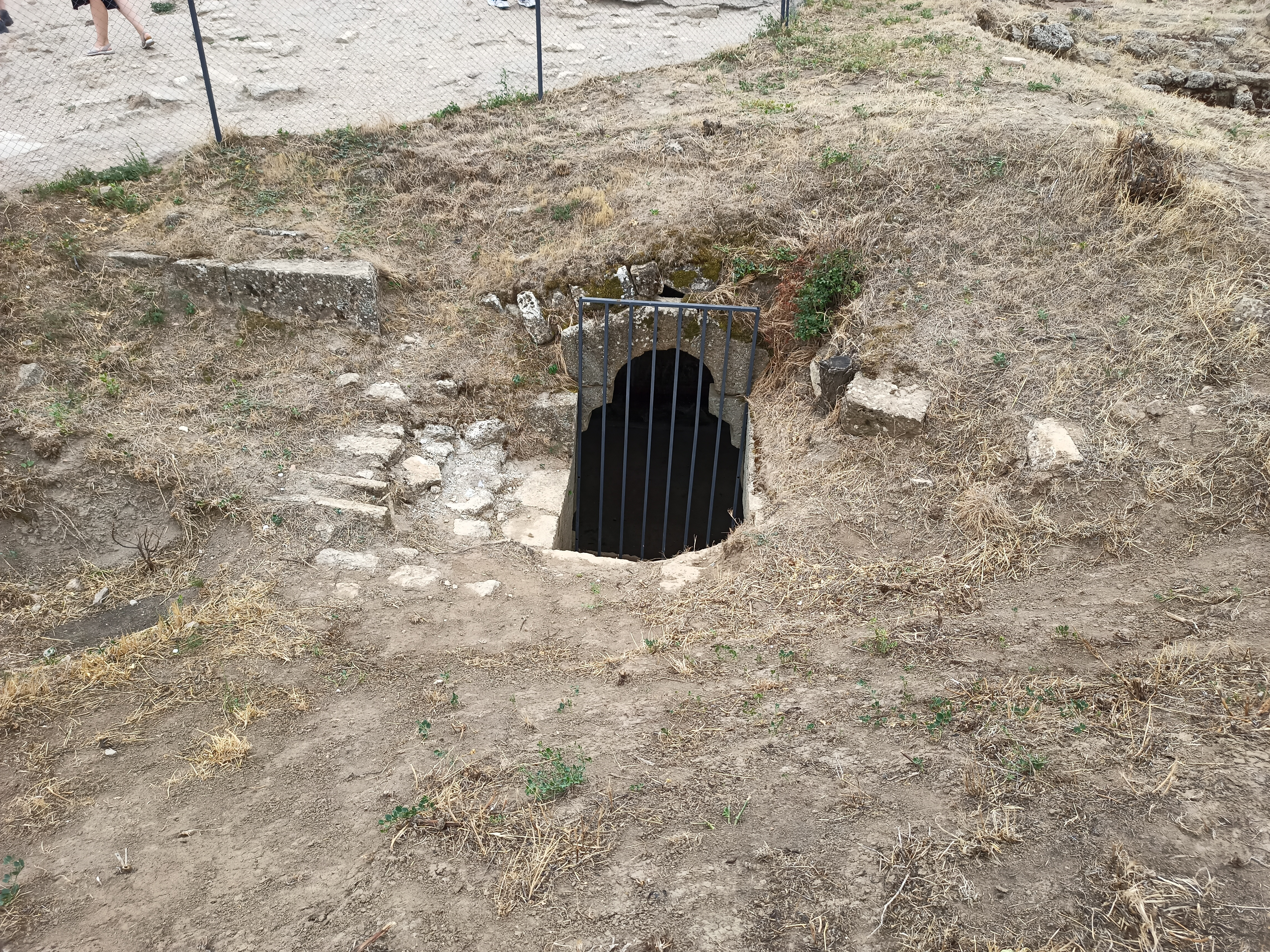
Window from the west

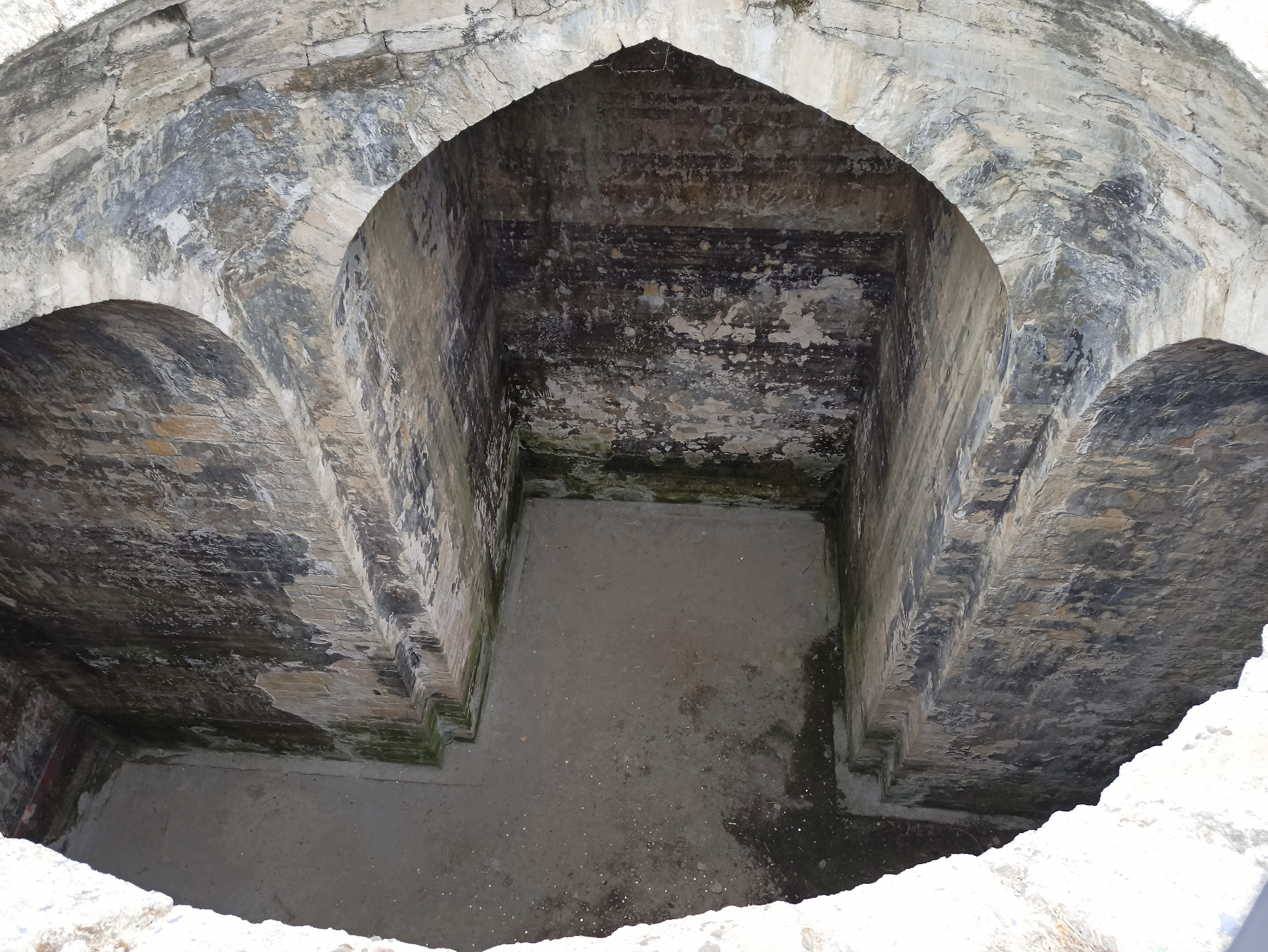
North view

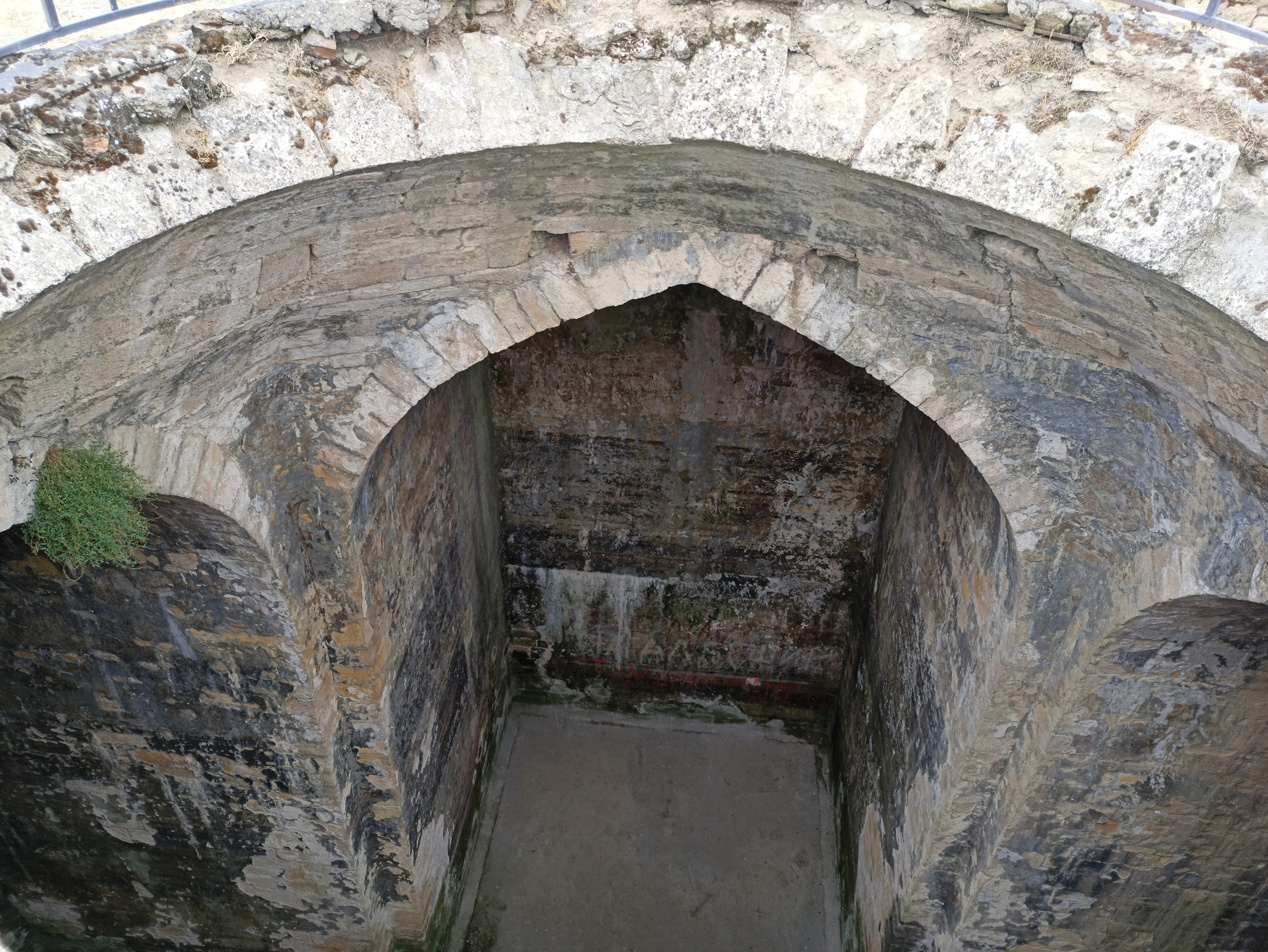
West view

The crossed-dome temple on the territory of Naryn-Kala is an early medieval Christian temple located in the northwestern part of the Naryn-Kala citadel in Derbent, Dagestan. For a long time, it was considered an underground reservoir for storing water.

== Description ==
According to written sources, Christianity has been widespread in Derbent since the early Middle Ages. Here, as historian Movses Kaghankatvatsi notes, was the residence of the Church of Caucasian Albania.

The temple in Naryn-Kala is a large underground structure and in historical literature was indicated as an “underground cistern” carved into the rock in which water was stored. However, recent archaeological studies have shown that this structure is a crossed-dome Christian temple, built according to some estimates in the 4th century, according to others in the 5th-7th centuries.

Initially, the temple was located above the ground, but apparently, over time, it sank into the ground. As a result, in the 17th-18th centuries the abandoned temple was repaired, cleaned and adapted for water storage.

Its layout has a crossed-dome shape, making it like other Christian churches of Transcaucasia in the 5th-7th centuries. Most likely it was abandoned after the arrival of the Arabs in Transcaucasia in the 8th-9th centuries.

The temple consists of 1 central nave and transept topped with a dome (partially destroyed). There is a window at the top of the western wall.

In the plan of the structure, the side is a cross with an intra-wall tube 4.7 m long. The internal length of the three sides of the cross is 4.2 m (excluding the central part of the base), and the fourth, western side has a length of 5.6 m. The central part of the structure is covered by a dome with a diameter of 5 m, apparently rebuilt in the late medieval period, the height from the floor to the top of the dome is about 10 m. The square space in the central part of the cross, covered by the dome, has a side equivalent to 5 m (i.e. 1 m more than the width of the end sides of the cross), and, as it were, the internal structure of the wall is cut 0.5 m from each side, which gives its central part a complicated structure. The total length of the monument from west to east is 15 m, from north to south 13 m. An examination of this supposed cistern reveals that it was not previously cut out of the rock, as it was believed, it was formed from large well-hewn blocks for lime mortar. When examining the object, fragments of light plaster coating are found on the surface.

On November 19, 2020, a conference was held: “The mystery of the crossed-dome structure on the territory of the Naryn-Kala fortress. History of Christianity in Derbent". As a result, the question of introducing amendments to the Order of the Government of the Russian Federation dated 01.06 was raised. 2009. No. 759-r regarding changing the name “Crossed-dome Reservoir” to the former name “Crossed-dome Temple in the Citadel.”

== See also ==
- Church of Caucasian Albania
