= Derbent Lighthouse =

Lighthouse in Russia

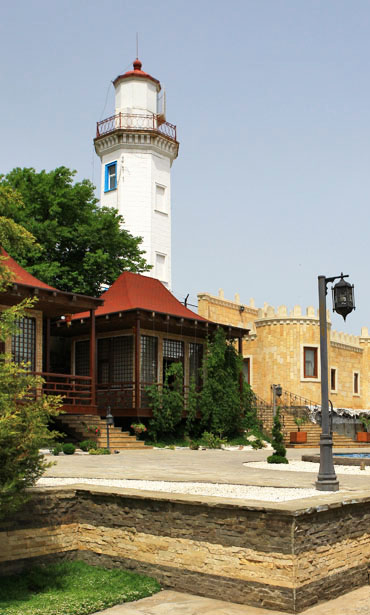
- Location: Derbent, Russia
- Coordinates: 42°03′41″N 48°17′46″E

Tower
- Constructed: 1853
- Construction: stone (tower)
- Height: 18.6 m (61 ft)
- Shape: octagonal prism
- Markings: white (tower), white (lantern), red (roof)
- Heritage: federal cultural heritage site in Russia, World Heritage Site

Light
- First lit: 1 May 1853
- Range: 18 nmi (33 km; 21 mi)

The Derbent Lighthouse is the southernmost lighthouse in Russia, located in the city of Derbent, a city in the Russian Republic of Dagestan. It is in the center of the city, on the fortress wall between the parks named after Sergei Kirov and Nizami Ganjavi and about half a kilometer from the coastline. The lighthouse is included in the list of protected monuments of Russia and is included in the historical list of UNESCO.

== History ==
Derbent as a seaport has been known since very ancient times, but the ancient authors never mentioned the existence of such an important attribute of the port as a lighthouse in Derbent. For the first time, Russian ships appeared in the area of the Derbent fortress in the 60s of the 16th century, when Russian troops made a number of campaigns on the western coast of the Caspian Sea.

In an effort to strengthen Russia's influence on the Caspian Sea, to establish the Baltic-Caspian waterway to expand trade relations between Europe and the East, Peter the Great organized the Persian campaign of the Russian fleet in 1722–1723, as a result of which Derbent and Baku with the lands adjacent to them were annexed to Russia (Russian-Persian treaty of September 12, 1723)

After the Russo-Persian War of 1826–1828, Russia received the exclusive right to have a military fleet on the Caspian Sea, and Russian and Persian merchant ships to sail freely in all directions.

Only in the middle of the 18th century, with the development of sea freight traffic, the opening of regular flights of postal and passenger steamers in the Caspian Sea with a call to the Derbent port, it became necessary to build a lighthouse in Derbent.

The port began to develop rapidly. Wanting to further intensify trade with Persia, Field Marshal General Prince M. S. Vorontsov, governor of the Caucasus, ordered in 1850 to take measures to ensure the safety of ships sailing along the western coast of the Caspian Sea and, in particular, to build a lighthouse in the port of Derbent. Work on the construction of the lighthouse began in 1851.

In 1853, the construction of the lighthouse designed by Captain Savinichev was completed. On January 16, 1853, the lighthouse was handed over to the assistant overseer of the quarantine and customs post. The lighthouse began to light up from May 1, 1853, from evening to dawn.
