= Yagutil Mishiev =

Soviet-Israeli author (1927–2024)

- Ягутил Мишиев
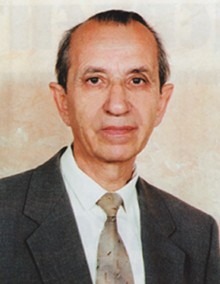
- Mishiev in 2012
- Born: 29 March 1927; Krasnaya Sloboda, Kuba Uyezd, Baku Governorate, Azerbaijan SSR, Transcaucasian SFSR, USSR
- Died: 2 April 2024 (aged 97); Rishon LeZion, Israel
- Occupation: Russian historian
- Writing career
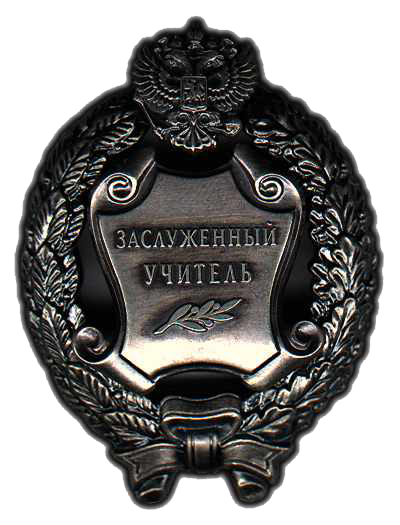
- Notable awards: 1984: Medal "Veteran of Labour" 1992: Medal "For Valiant Labour in the Great Patriotic War 1941–1945" 1995: Jubilee Medal "50 Years of Victory in the Great Patriotic War 1941–1945" 1997: Honored Teacher of the Russian Federation

Yagutil Israelovich Mishiev (Russian: Ягутил Израилович Мишиев; Hebrew: יאגוטיל מישייב; 29 March 1927 – 2 April 2024) was a Soviet-Israeli author of books on the history of Derbent, Dagestan, Russia.

== Biography ==
Yagutil Mishiev was born in Qırmızı Qəsəbə (English: Red Town, also known as Krasnaya Sloboda, a village and municipality in the Quba Rayon of Azerbaijan, USSR). In 1943, he was sent to study teachers courses and started teaching at the age of 16. In 1944, he completed a diploma program using distance learning with a degree from The Kuban Pedagogical College, Kuba, Azerbaijan. In 1945, while working at a school, he started a math degree at the Kuban Pedagogical Institute. In 1947, he attained a diploma of a teacher of physics and mathematics.

From 1943 to 1951, he helped the board of the municipality of Kuba, Azerbaijan to prepare documents to award a medal to those who worked on the labor front of World War II. The medal is called Doblisneye Trud, valiant work during World War II from 1941–1945.

In 1946, he was asked by the head of the Kuba military enlistment office to complete a census of veterans to be able to award them the medal entitled For the Victory Over Germany in the Great Patriotic War 1941–1945. In 1951, the Mishiev family moved to Derbent, a city in the Dagestan Republic of Russia.

In 1997, Mishiev immigrated to Israel and settled in Rishon LeZion.

Mishiev died on 2 April 2024, at the age of 97.

== Pedagogic and literary career ==
From 1954, Yagutil Mishiev worked as a teacher of mathematics in The School for Working Youth, also titled School No. 1. In 1963, he got a master's degree of a math teacher from Dagestan State University. For many years, Mishiev worked as the director of the Museum of Regional Studies. Mishiev also collected unique materials on the history of the city. From 1976 to 1991, Mishiev worked as the principal of School No. 11 in Derbent. From 1991 to 1997, Yagutil Israelovich Mishiev worked as a chief specialist in the City Department of Education.

In Israel, Mishiev has written several books about the history and the historical architectural monuments of the city of Derbent. His titles include A Long Road of 5000 Years and Derbent and World Civilization. Also, he wrote a Russian-English Dictionary of Mathematical Terms. That work was written for pupils, students, teachers and parents. A book Our Roots, Mishiev wrote a record of his family and their doings. His latest book, Only memory does not get old was devoted to the history of Jewish civilization.

== Local History Museum ==
In 1952, the Commission of the Ministry of Culture of Russia ordered the closure of the museum of regional studies because the exhibits did not meet the minimum requirements for a particular historical period as laid out by the Ministry for a museum. Recommendations were made for certain changes, after which the museum could reopen. It was necessary for new leadership of the museum.

On October 5, 1954, the Department of Culture of the city of Derbent appointed Yagutil Mishiev as Director of the Local History Museum, a position he held until February 25, 1969. Mishiev started to create a new exhibition. In 1954, the museum was able to re-open. Working for years in the museum, Mishiev travelled around the Derbent District to collect unique materials and information about the history of the city. He studied the archives of the city of Derbent, of the Azerbaijan State Museum of History in Baku, and of the Regional Museum of Dagestan in Makhachkala. Soon, scholars of Dagestan, the Academy of Sciences of the USSR and the Azerbaijan National Academy of Sciences started to inquire about various issues related to the museum. In the second half of the 50s, the museum started to promote the history of the historic city of Derbent and educate people about it. Mishiev conducted lectures and regularly appeared in the pages of the city's newspaper titled Znamya Kommunizma (lit. 'The Banner of Communism'), as well as in the regional newspaper titled Leninchi, written in the Azerbaijani language. The museum work that started in 1952 became a part of his life.

== Published works ==
=== Books ===
==== Dictionary ====
- Russian-English Dictionary of Mathematical Terms. Written in 1999.

==== History of Derbent ====
- A Long Road of 5000 Years (2002) ISBN 9785914620469, ISBN 9781684891924, OCLC 1298898981
- Derbent and World Civilization (2005) ISBN 9785914620452, OCLC 1313562533

==== Family history ====
- Our Roots (2008)

==== History of Jewish civilization ====
- Only memory does not get old (2014) ISBN 9785914620476, OCLC 1256585472
- The Mountain Jews (2022) ISBN 9785914626506, OCLC 1353608331

=== Articles ===
- The Soviet Historical Encyclopedia – Derbent
- Novei Rubej (New Frontier Magazine) - Memories of the past, about the life of their ancestors - it is our duty!
- In the 60s and 70s he wrote articles for the newspaper Znamya Kommunizma (The Banner of Communism), currently called Derbentskiye Novestye (The News of Derbent) about the stories behind the monuments of Derbent.
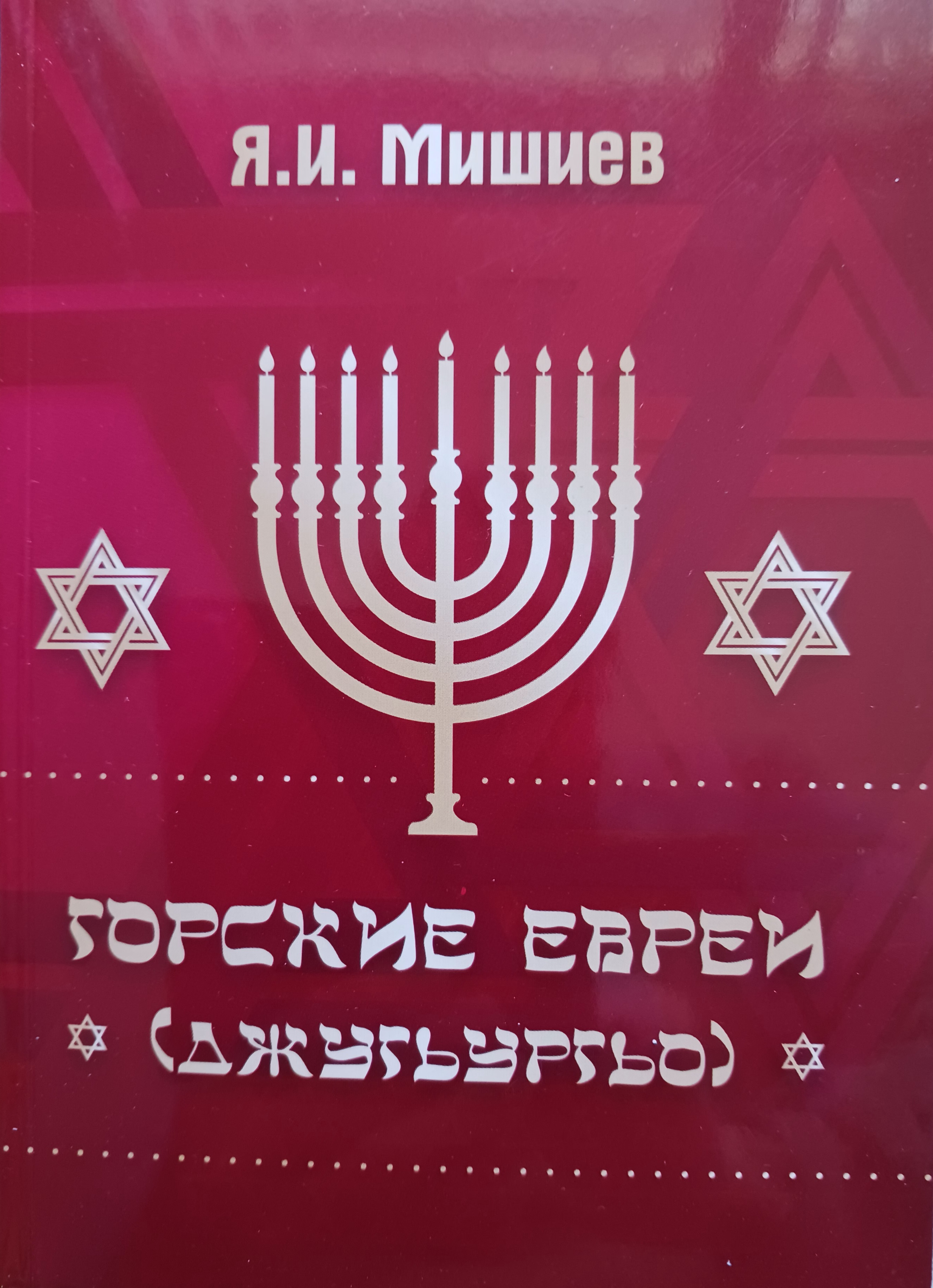
The Mountain Jews (2022)

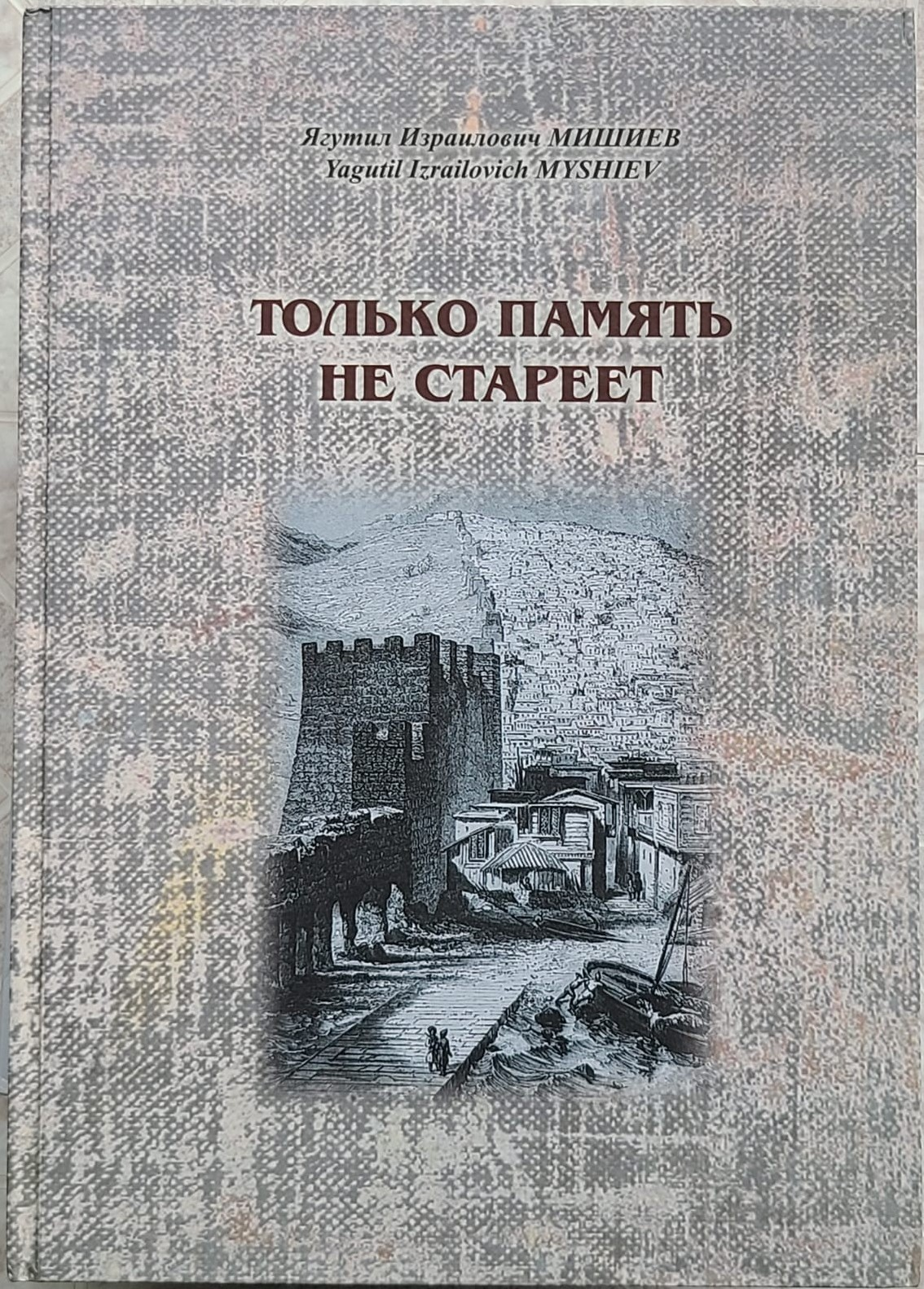
Only memory does not get old (2014)

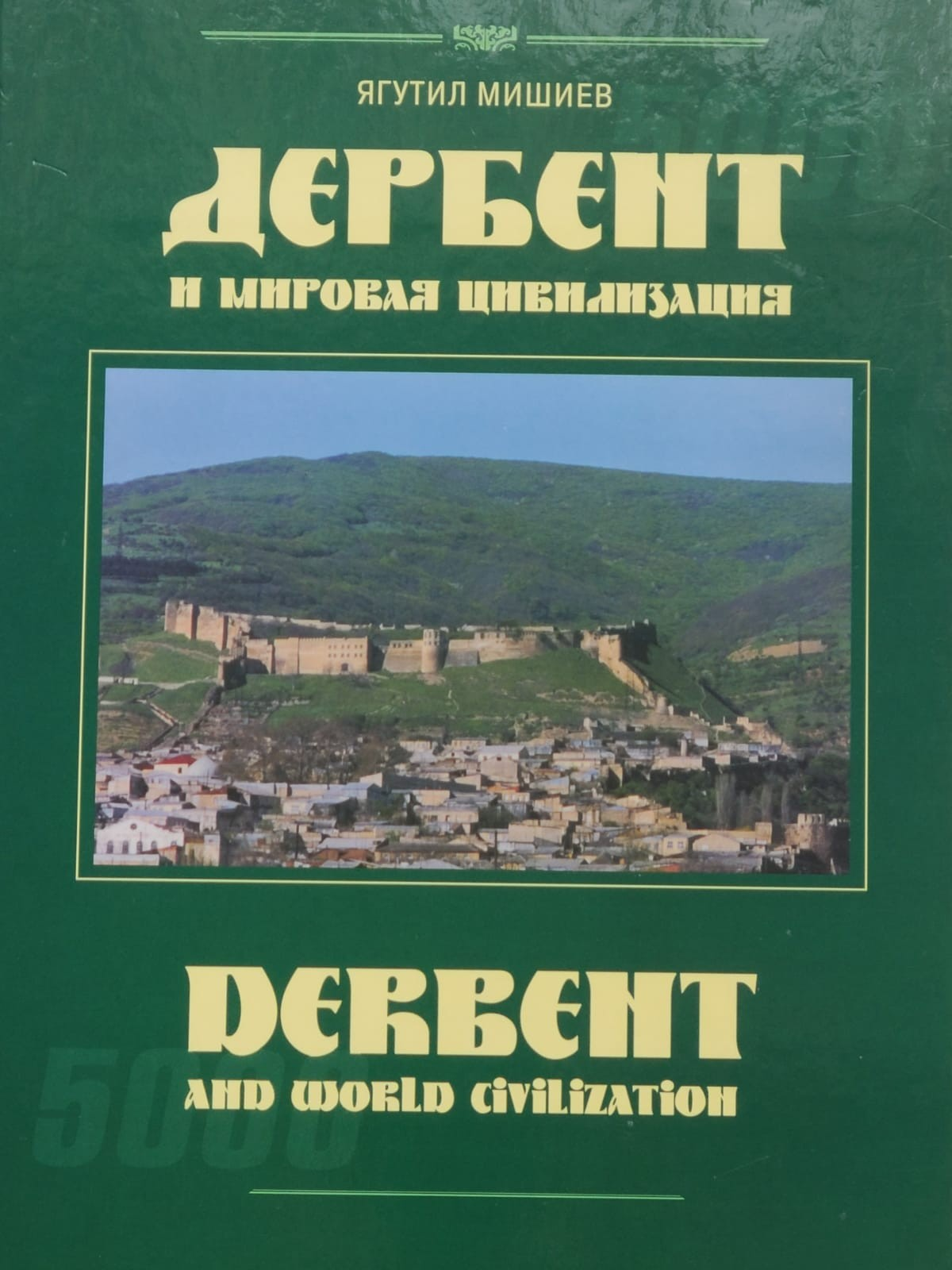
Derbent and World Civilization (2005)

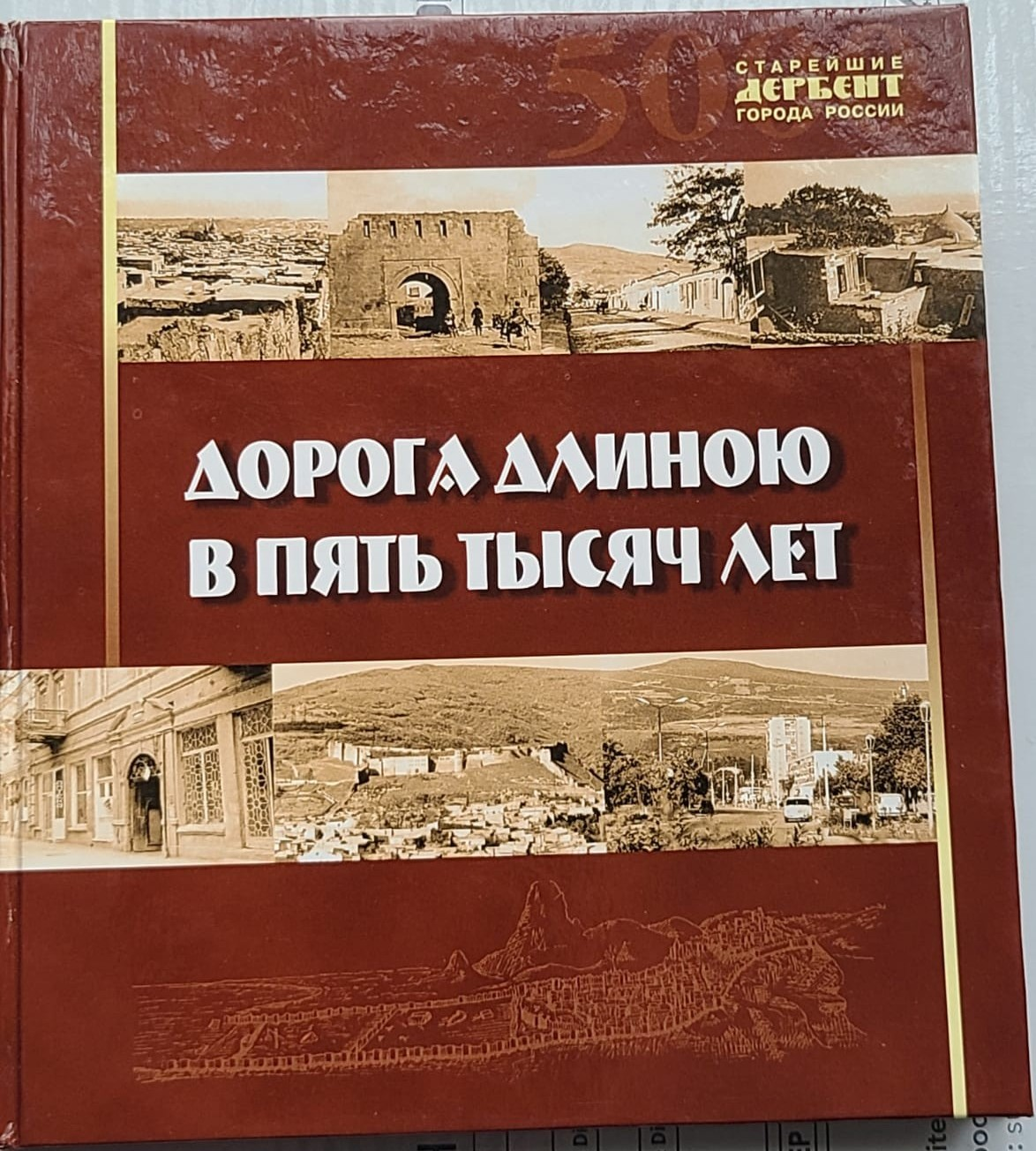
A Long Road of 5000 Years (2002)

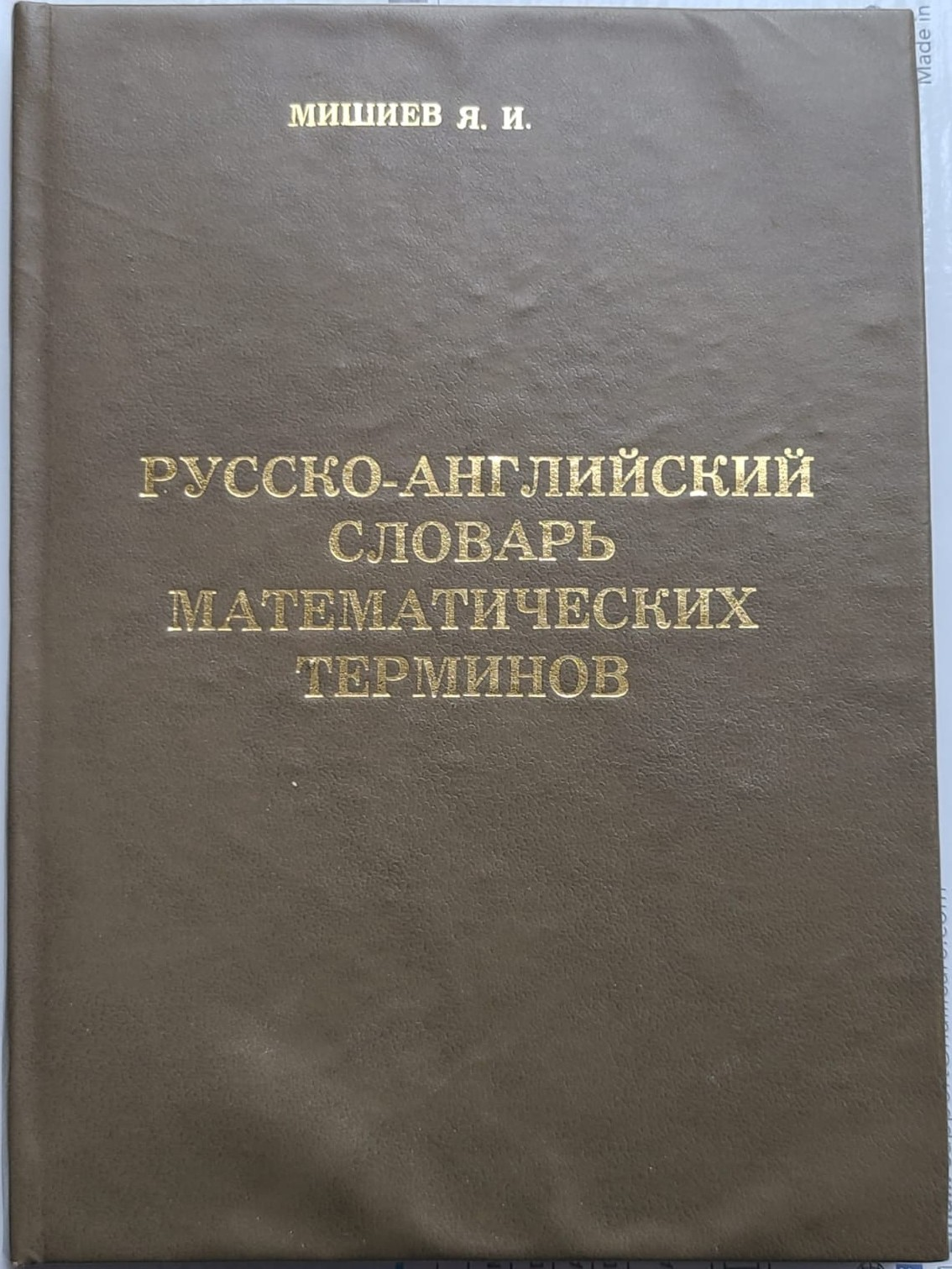
Russian-English Dictionary of Mathematical Terms (1999)

== Awards and recognition ==
- 1967. Highest Level Award of Recognition from the Ministry of Culture of the RSFSR
- 1984. Medal "Veteran of Labour"
- 1992. Medal "For Valiant Labour in the Great Patriotic War 1941–1945"
- 1994. Honored Teacher of the Republic of Dagestan
- 1995. Jubilee Medal "50 Years of Victory in the Great Patriotic War 1941–1945"
- 1997. Honored Teacher of the Russian Federation

== Legacy ==
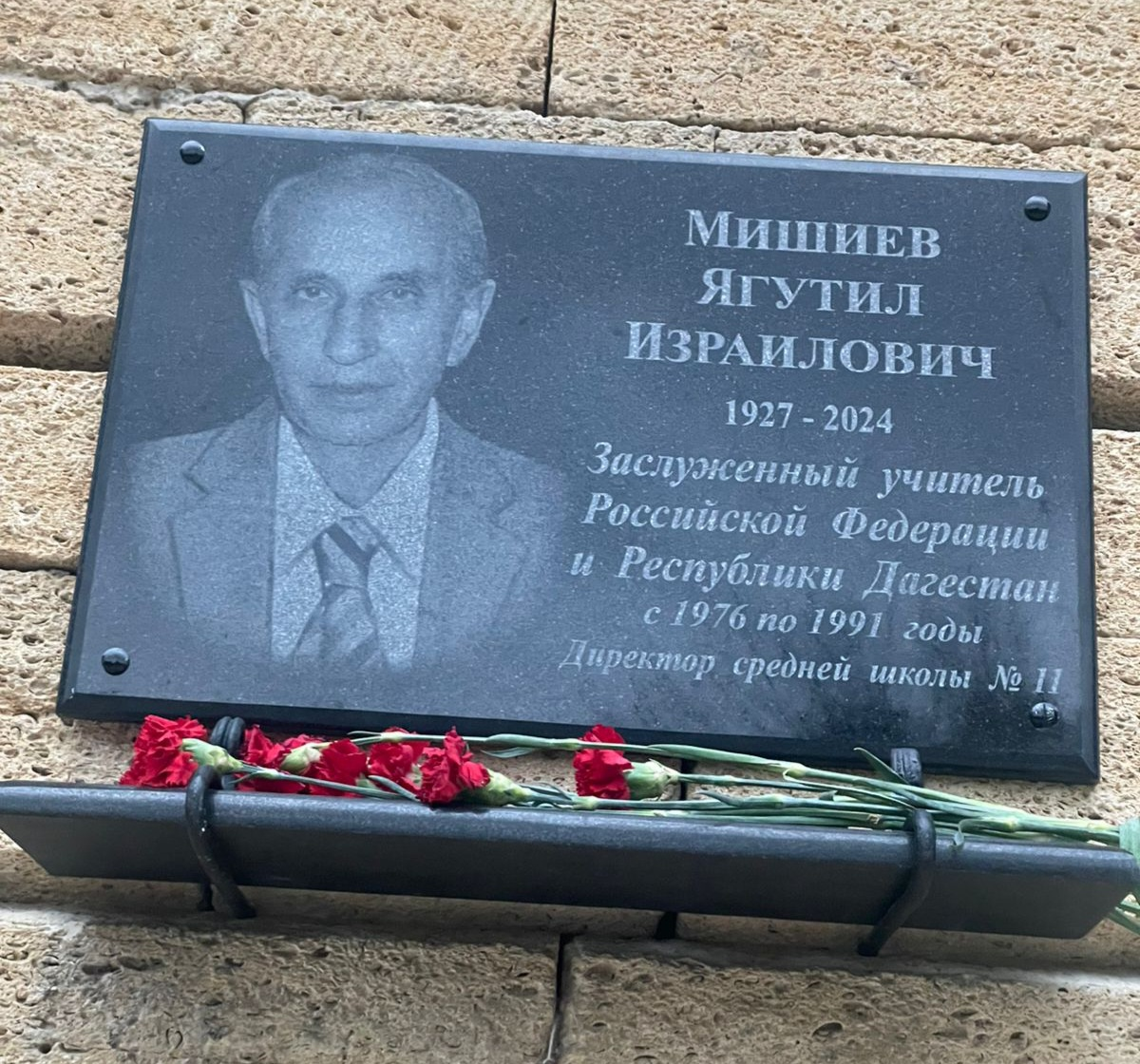
A memorial plaque for Yagutil Mishiev.

On October 8, 2025, by Decree No. 23-02/47 of the Assembly of Deputies of the urban district “City of Derbent,” a decision was made to honor the memory of the educator, Honored Teacher of the Russian Federation Yagutil Israelovich Mishiev, by installing a memorial plaque on the facade of School No. 11.

== See also ==
- A video about Ягутил Мишиев
- Unveiling of a memorial plaque for Yagutil Mishiev on the facade of School No. 11 in Derbent, Russia. (in Russian)
