= Alexander Bestuzhev House =

House museum in Derbent, Dagestan

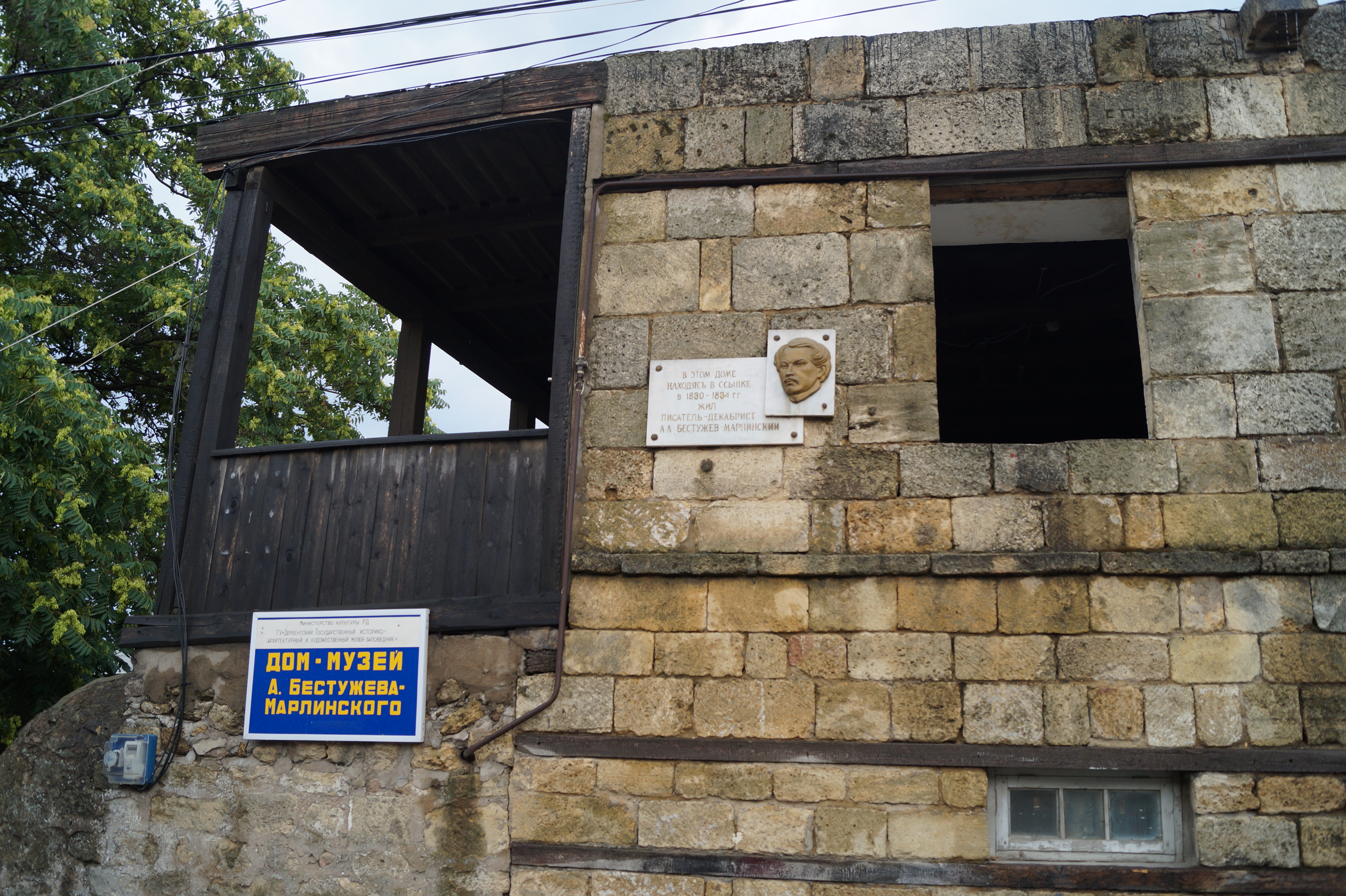
- The Alexander Bestuzhev House
- Interactive fullscreen map
- Established: 1986; 40 years ago
- Location: 7 Mahallah street, block 147, building 23, Derbent, Dagestan, Russia.
- Coordinates: 42°03′13″N 48°16′41″E
- Type: Writer's home
- Website: https://derbentmuseum.ru/memorialnyj-dom-muzej-a-a-bestuzheva-marlinskogo/

The Alexander Bestuzhev House, also known as Memorial house museum of A. A. Bestuzhev-Marlinsky (Russian: Мемориальный дом-музей А. А. Бестужева-Марлинского) is a writer's house museum in the city of Derbent, Dagestan, where the Decembrist writer Alexander Bestuzhev lived in 1830-1834. He was transferred to the Caucasus after exile in Yakutsk, where he was sent for participating in the Senate Square uprising. The museum is part of the Derbent State Historical, Architectural and Archaeological Museum-Reserve.

== History ==
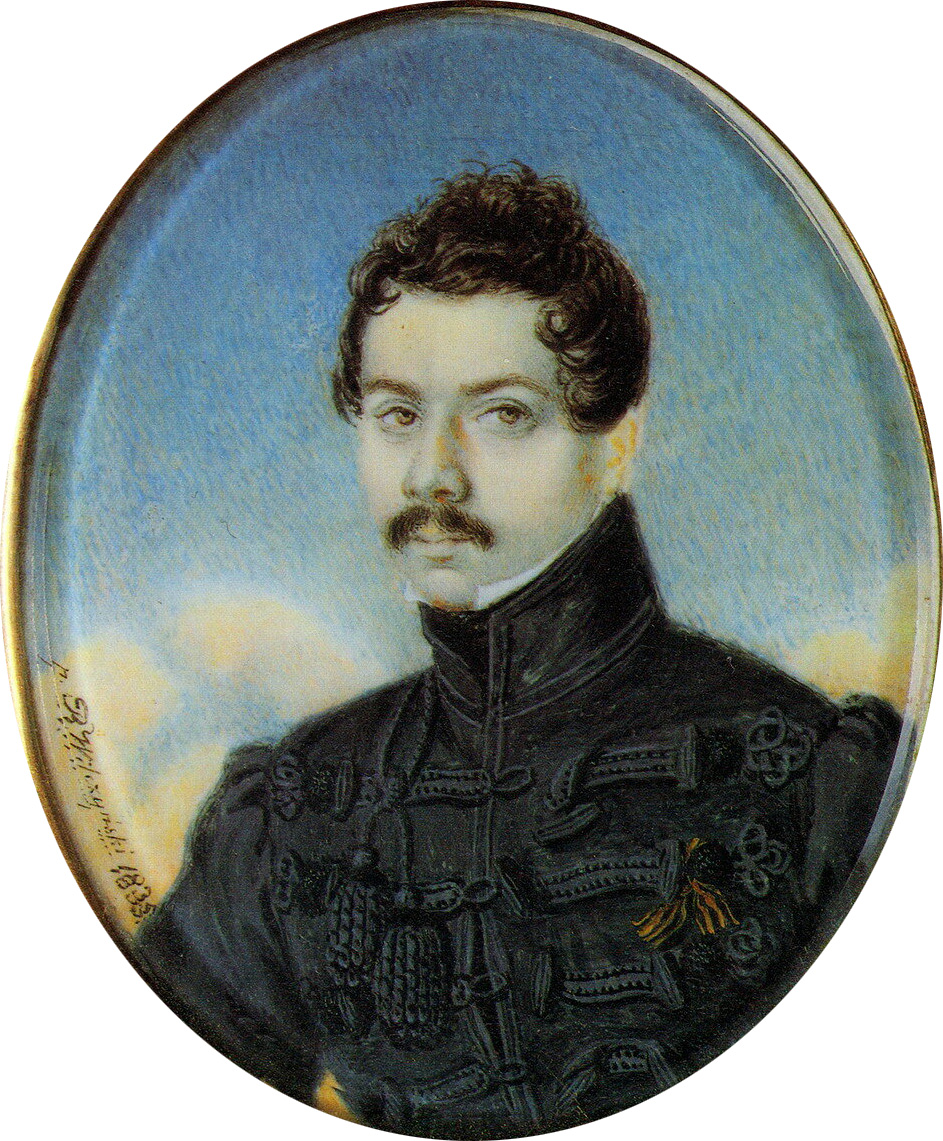
Portrait of A. A. Bestuzhev-Marlinsky, 1835

The museum is a memorial complex consisting of a two-story stone house and a courtyard, which is a typical example of Derbent architecture of the late 18th - early 19th centuries, located in the old (mahallah) part of the city. The exiled Decembrist writer Alexander Bestuzhev lived in this house for four years from 1830 to 1834. Today, the museum building is a monument of federal significance. A memorial plaque dedicated to the memory of Alexander Bestuzhev is installed on the wall of the house.

After the revolution, the house was privately owned for a long time, until the director of the Derbent Museum of Local History Pyotr Ivanovich Spassky came up with the initiative to create a museum in it. In 1941, the building was bought, but the beginning of the Great Patriotic War of 19141-1945 delayed the organization of the museum. For a long time, the house was empty, then it housed a children's library, and in 1986 restoration began and on October 12, 1988 the museum was opened.

The exhibition of the house-museum is located on two floors and consists of four halls. In the former living rooms, the furnishings of Bestuzhev's rooms have been recreated, where both authentic items used by the Decembrist writer (a wooden sofa, chairs, a piano, a desk) and household items and utensils are exhibited, recreating the interior and decoration of the house of a wealthy Derbent resident of the 19th century.

A separate section of the museum's exhibition is dedicated to the museum and scientific activities of Pyotr Ivanovich Spassky, the organizer of the house-museum of Alexander Bestuzhev.

A unique item exhibited in the museum is the tombstone from the grave of Olga Nestertseva, a 19-year-old seamstress who fell in love with Alexander Bestuzhev. Olga died in an accident in his house.

== See also ==
- Derbent State Museum-Reserve
- Cabin of Peter the Great

== Heritage ==
- Cultural heritage site № 0510073000
