= Cabin of Peter the Great (Derbent) =

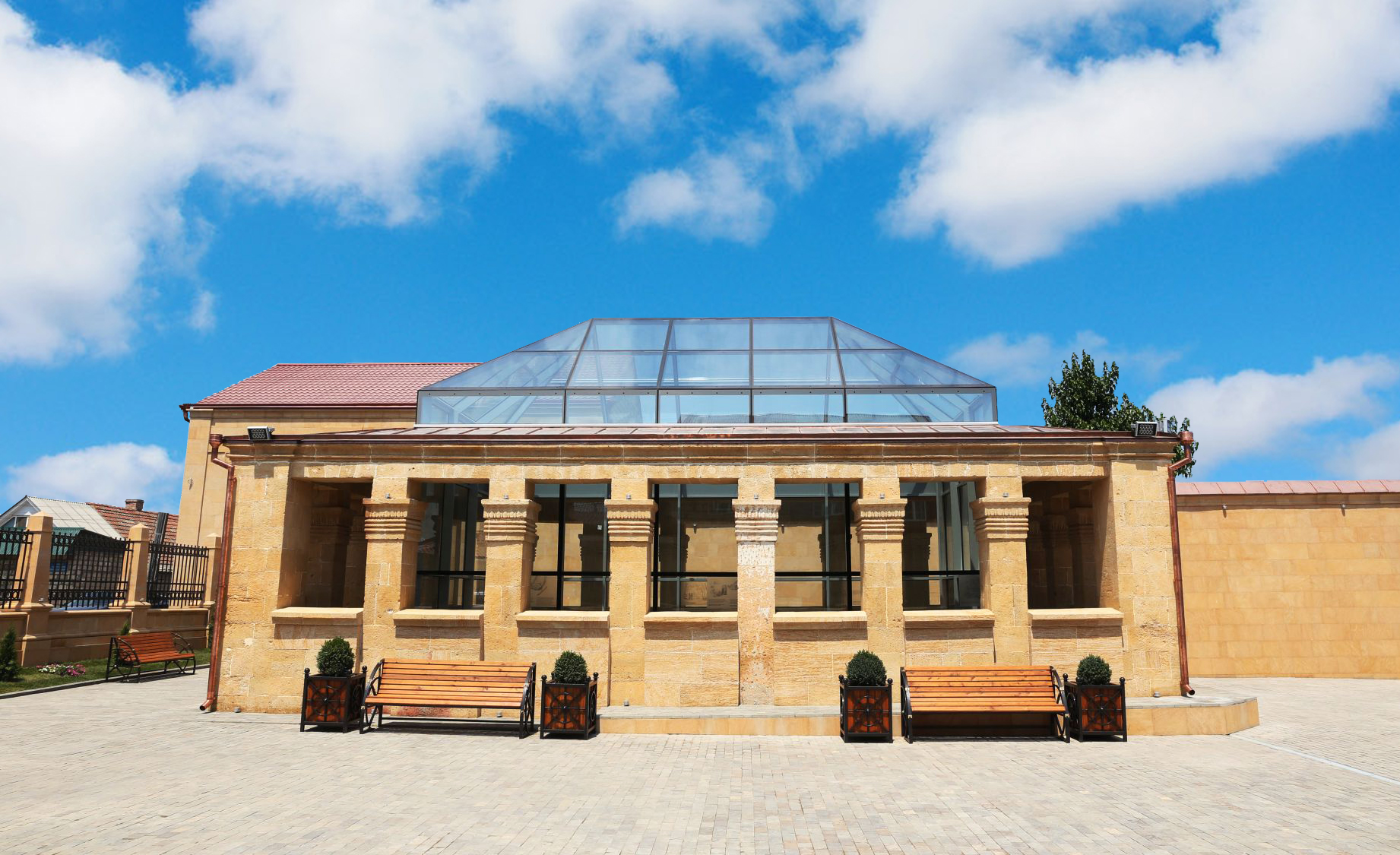
- The Cabin of Peter the Great in Derbent. July 23, 2015.
- Interactive fullscreen map
- Established: 1722; 304 years ago
- Location: 16a Zoya Kosmodemyanskaya Street, Derbent, Dagestan, Russia
- Coordinates: 42°03′42″N 48°18′15″E
- Type: Natural history museum

The Cabin of Peter the Great (Russian: Домик (землянка) Петра I) is the place in the city of Derbent in Dagestan, where Tsar Peter the Great spent the night during the Persian Campaign of 1722. Only the foundation of the dugout has survived, over which a cultural and historical complex was built in the 21st century, including a pavilion-colonnade, a monument to the first Russian emperor and a museum building. The museum complex, opened in 2015, is a structural subdivision of the Derbent State Museum-Reserve.

The main exhibit of the museum complex is the remains of the dugout in which Peter the Great stayed during his stay in Derbent.

== History ==
In 1722, during the Persian campaign, Peter the Great stayed overnight in a specially built two-room dugout, sheltered from the summer heat. The object was located approximately 100 m west of the seashore and 50 m south of the Northern fortress wall and consisted of two small rooms. The Tsar stayed in Derbent for three days and then went with his army and fleet further to Baku, leaving a Russian military garrison in the ancient fortress.

In 1848, the Viceroy of the Caucasus, Prince Vorontsov, ordered the dugout to be surrounded by a stone fence. Anchor chains were hung on the stone pillars and a cast-iron plate was installed with the inscription "The place of the first resting place of Peter the Great on August 23, 1722." Two cannons, cast in 1715, were installed around the fence. Later, in the second half of the 19th century, a monumental pavilion of square stone columns under a hipped iron roof was built over the dugout. The landmark was visited more than once by members of the imperial family and many other famous people. Among them were the writer Alexandre Dumas in 1858 and the emperor of Russia Nicholas II in 1850.

The Tsar's dugout was lost in the 20th century during the Russian Civil War. In Soviet times, the historical monument was not given any importance, because of which the building sank deeper and deeper into the ground.

The colonnade building was rebuilt into a residential building, the surrounding area was also actively built up with industrial and residential buildings, and the remains of the dugout of the first Russian emperor were buried under a new foundation.

== Recreation ==
In 2015, the cabin was given the status of a museum complex "House of Peter the Great in Derbent". Excavations were carried out with funds from the Ziyavudin Magomedov "Peri" charitable foundation. The colonnade, which was built over the dugout in the 19th century, was restored on the site of the dugout. A modern museum building was erected nearby.

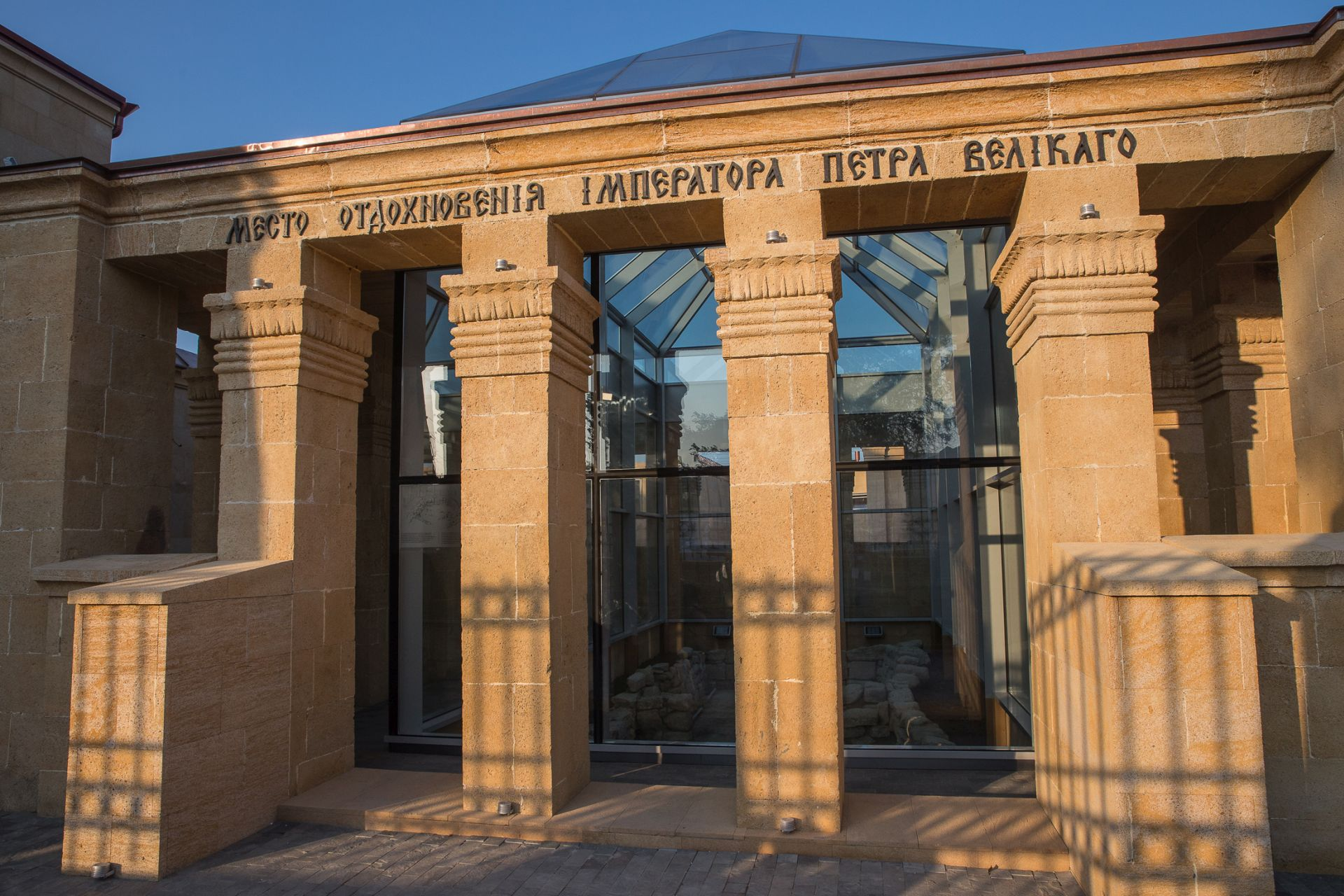

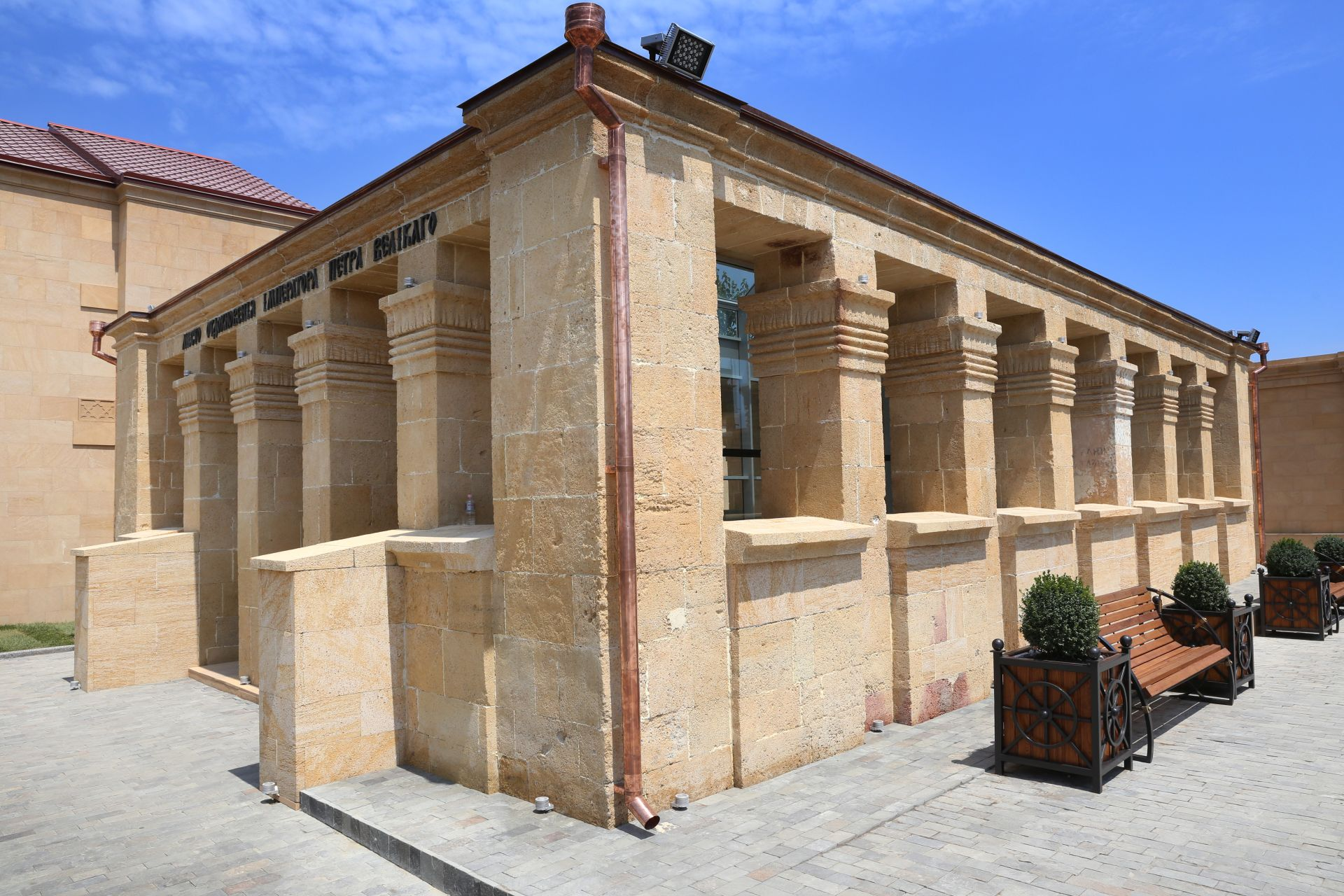

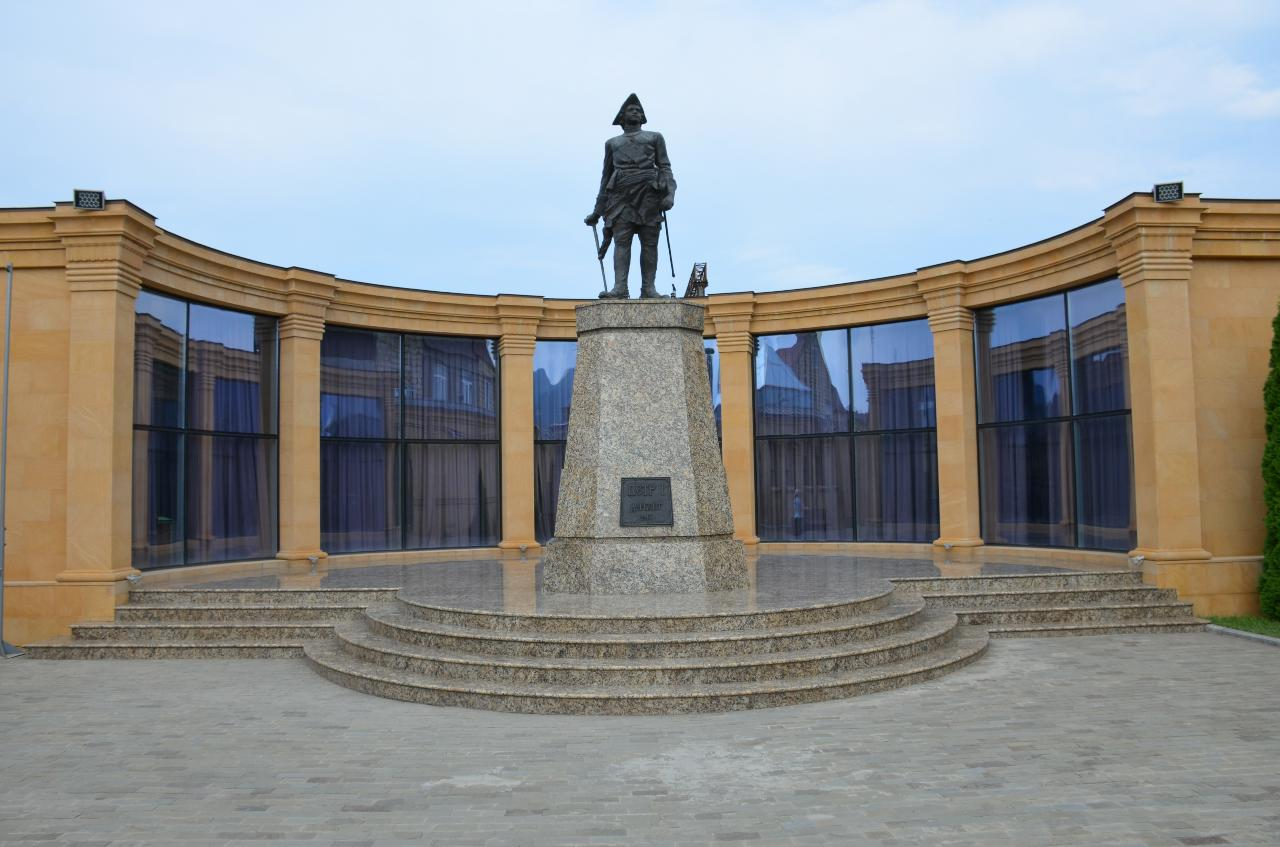

== See also ==
- Derbent State Museum-Reserve
- Alexander Bestuzhev House

== Heritage ==
- Cultural heritage site № 0530020000
