= Fortifications of Derbent =

Citadel, Ancient City and Fortress Buildings of Derbent
UNESCO World Heritage Site
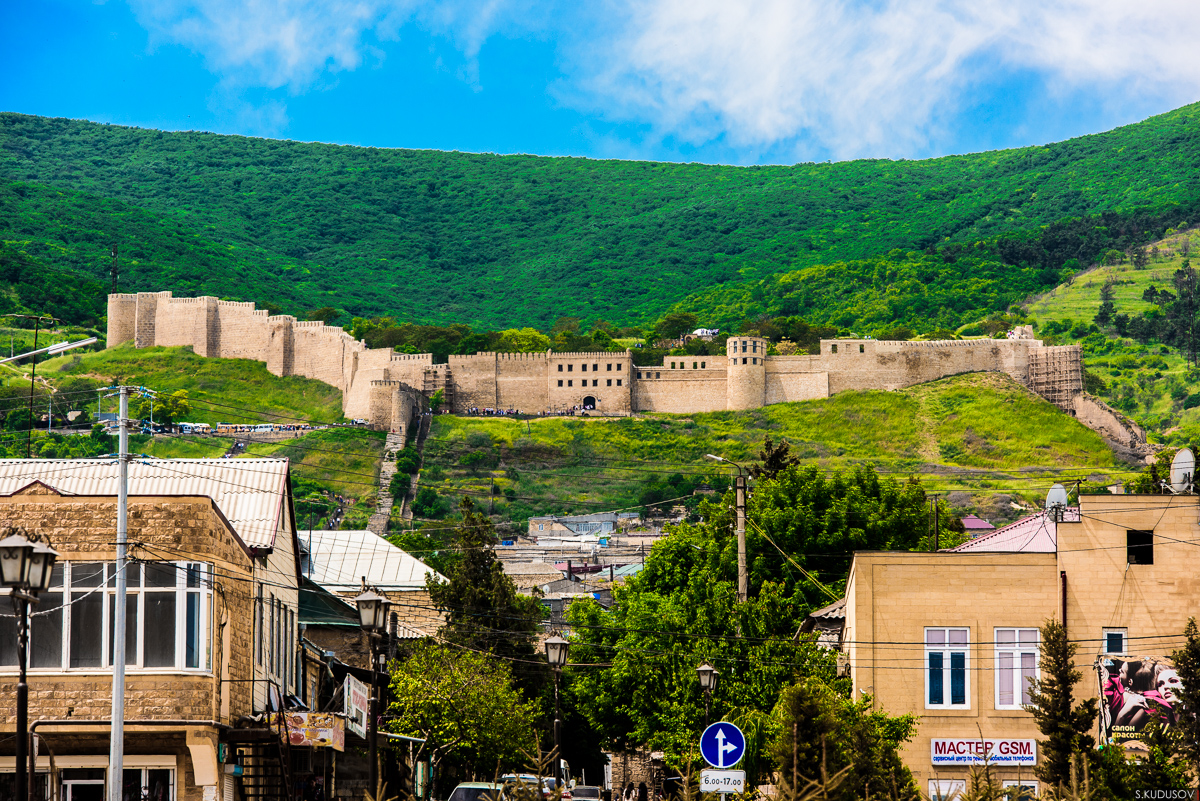
- View of the citadel from Derbent
- Interactive map of Citadel, Ancient City and Fortress Buildings of Derbent
- Location: Russia
- Criteria: Cultural: iii, iv
- Reference: 1070
- Inscription: 2003 (27th Session)
- Area: 9.7 ha (24 acres)
- Buffer zone: 2 ha (4.9 acres)
- Coordinates: 42°03′10″N 48°16′27″E

The Fortifications of Derbent (Darband) are one of the fortified defense lines, some of which date to the times as early as those built by the Persian Sasanian Empire to protect the eastern passage of the Caucasus Mountains (the "Caspian Gates") against the attacks of the nomadic peoples of the Pontic–Caspian steppe.

With the first parts built in the 6th century during the reign of Persian Emperor Khosrow I and maintained by various later Arab, Turkish and Persian regimes, the fortifications comprise three distinct elements: the citadel of Naryn-Kala at Derbent, the twin long walls connecting it with the Caspian Sea in the east, and the "mountain wall" of Dagh-Bary, running from Derbent to the Caucasus foothills in the west. The immense wall, with a height of up to twenty meters and a thickness of about 10 feet (3.0 meters), stretched for forty kilometers between the Caspian Sea and the Caucasus Mountains, thirty north-looking towers stretched for forty kilometers between the Caspian Sea and the Caucasus Mountains, effectively blocking the passage across the Caucasus. The fortification complex was made a UNESCO World Heritage Site in 2003.

== History ==
Already in Classical Antiquity, the settlement of Derbent and its wider region (the "Caspian Gates") were known for their strategic location between the Caspian Sea and the eastern foothills of the Caucasus Mountains, separating the settled regions south of the Caucasus from the nomadic peoples dominating the Pontic–Caspian steppe to the north. Archaeological evidence points to the establishment of a fortified settlement on the Derbent hill as early as the late 8th century BCE, probably under the impact of Scythian raids. This settlement initially covered only the more protected northeastern side of the hill (some 4–5 hectares), but over the 6th–4th centuries BCE expanded to cover its entire surface (c. 15 hectares). The walls of that settlement were some 2 metres (6.6 ft) high and maximally 7 metres (23 ft) thick, with evidence of repeated destruction and rebuilding throughout the period.

From the 4th century BCE, the settlement began to expand beyond the hill fortress, which became a citadel to an expanding city. In the 1st century BCE, Derbent became incorporated in the kingdom of Caucasian Albania, probably as its northernmost possession. Derbent experienced a period of considerable prosperity in the first three centuries of the Common Era, but the resumption of nomad raids in the 4th century (first the Alans and later the Huns) meant that it quickly reverted to its role as a frontier post and a "symbolic boundary between nomadic and agrarian ways of life". In the late 4th century CE, Albania passed under Sasanian influence and control; in the 5th century, it was a Sasanian border fortress and the seat of a march-warden (marzban).

During the reign of Khosrow I the fortress was built. The adobe fortifications that were built under the reign of Yazdegerd II were replaced with harder stones and other efforts heavily expanded Sasanian fortified defense constructions in the Eastern Caucasus. The fortress was considered to be the peak of fortifying architecture for the epoch. Its frontiered "long walls" covered the belting of the Caspian Sea from East to West. Khosrow I “erected a wall of rock and lead, stretching from the sea to the top of the mountains, and hanged iron gates at the entrance." Some historical writers, such as Ibn al-Faqih and al-Tabari, have ascribed the construction of the Derbent fortifications to two other Sasanian rulers and not just Khosrow I. This namely includes attribution to Khosrow's father Kavad I and to his grandfather Peroz. However, historian Kosumova makes an essential argument, contrary to this historical perception, by affirming that the construction was initiated under Khosrow I rather than under Kavad I:

Mentioned in the inscriptions is the amargar (a financial official of a high rank) of Ādurbādagān (kust ī Ādurbādagān), the title being introduced during the first years of Khosrow I Anushirvan’s reign, its jurisdiction, apart from proper Ādurbādagān, covering the Transcaucasian territories of the Sasanians―Albania, Armenia, and Iberia. Kosumova referred this date to the time of Khosrow I Anushirvan (568), defining it as the date of one of the “stages of construction works”. And if this date fixes the end of the first and relatively short stage of the works, the possibility of the initiation of the Derbend complex construction under Kavad is out of question.

Other historians have asserted that the construction of the Derbent fortifications took huge time intervals. This is purported to be the case based on the heated political and military situations of the time, occurring in the region. Historian Kudeyavtsev claimed that it was impossible for "the construction of a massive defensive complex with the 2 million cubic metres of masonry content [to occur] during such a short period of time." Although the construction was heavily distributed through time, most historians agree that the major parts of the construction were still done under Khosrow I, who did the bulk of the work. Khosrow also created 20 other fortified centers in the Caucasus, chiefly located in the East Caucasus. However, the fortifying works around the Derbent Gorge area are agreed upon by all scholars that they took a considerable time interval to complete.

The Armenian writer Movses Kalankatuaci stated that at the beginning of the 7th century, the kings of Persia had built the Derbent walls at a "great expense" because it led their country to be financially "bled out" from the substantive expenses incurred from the project. Many signatures remain from the workers of the fortress, left on the fortress walls. There are also various Middle Persian (Pahlavi) inscriptions on the walls of the fortress and Northern/Southern walls inside the city. After the Arab conquest of Persia various Arabic inscriptions were also made. The walls and fortifications of Derbent were highly useful against Sasanian enemies, notably the Byzantines and others, such as the Savirs, the Abkhaz, the Banjar, the Balanjar, and the Alan peoples. Some of these groups were also Byzantine allies.

Sasanian Iran had also fought multiple battles against the diverse Caucasian tribes in the late 550s and early 560s period. This campaign activity in the Caucasus was done primarily to reach a temporarily peaceful situation in the Caucasus, but it was also aimed at creating an opportunity for initiating a large-scale fortification construction project located in the Caucasus: this would culminate in the Derbend fortifications system. The Derbent fortifications were successful in permanently stopping the Caucasians' nomads' incursions. In the financial dimension, the Iran-Byzantinum peace treaty of 561 obliged the Byzantines to pay Iran 30 thousand solids (i.e. 136.5 kg of gold coins) every year for 50 years. They also had to render tribute for the first seven years at once, under the peace deal. A significant amount of this money was invested by the Sasanians into the Caucasian gates and fortifications, especially the Derbent fortress. This information proves how the Derbent fortress, as the pinnacle of fortifications for its time, was built through simultaneous military genius and underlying historical circumstances.

The Citadel of Derbent is one of the most popular tourist attractions in the city of Derbent and the Republic of Dagestan.

== Documentary film ==
In 2022 Pejman Akbarzadeh made the documentary film "Derbent: What Persia Left Behind". The film which explores the history and architecture of Derbent fortification was screened at various academic conferences including the German Orientalists Day in Berlin and the biennial of Iranian Studies Association in Salamanca.

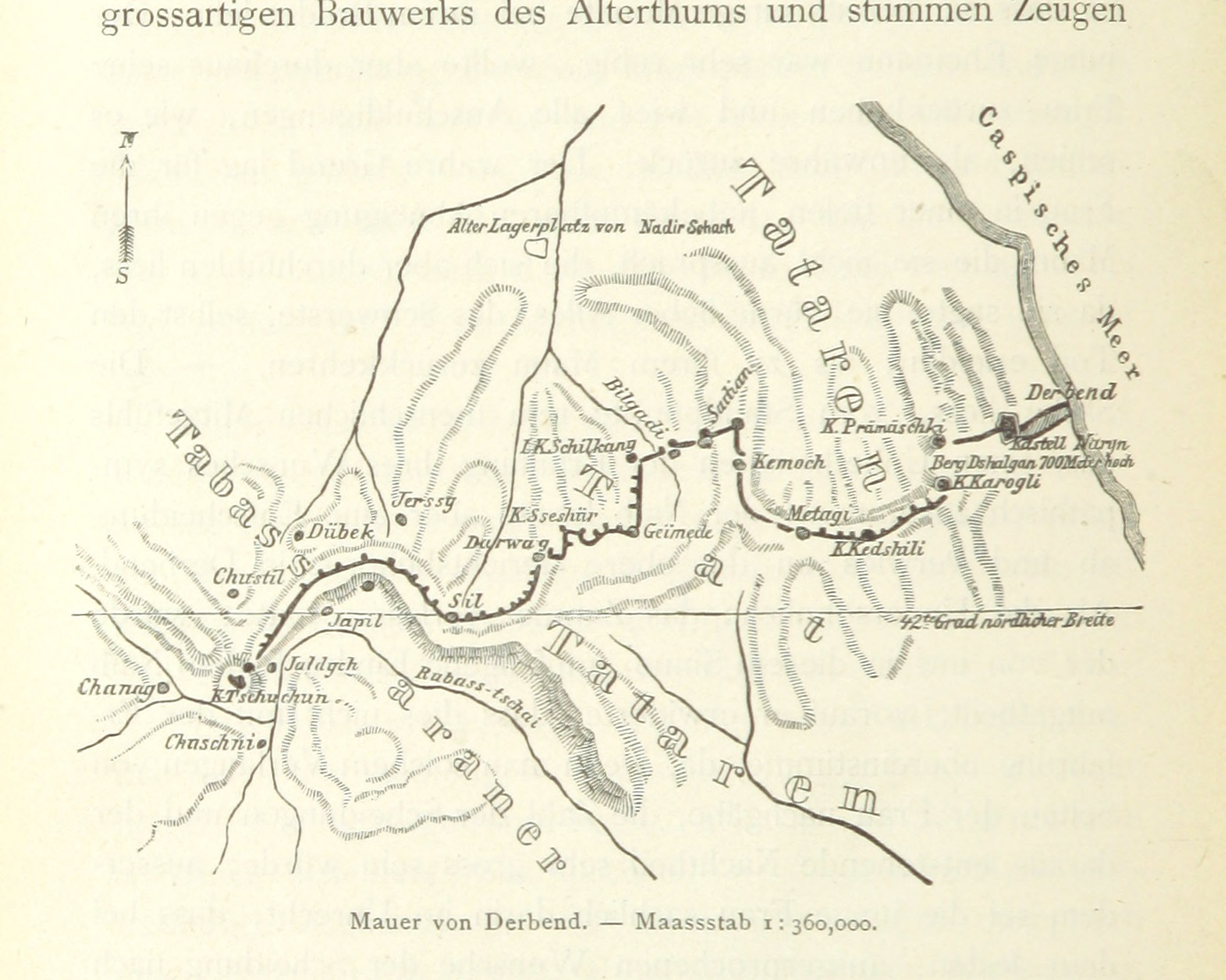
Map by Roderich von Erckert

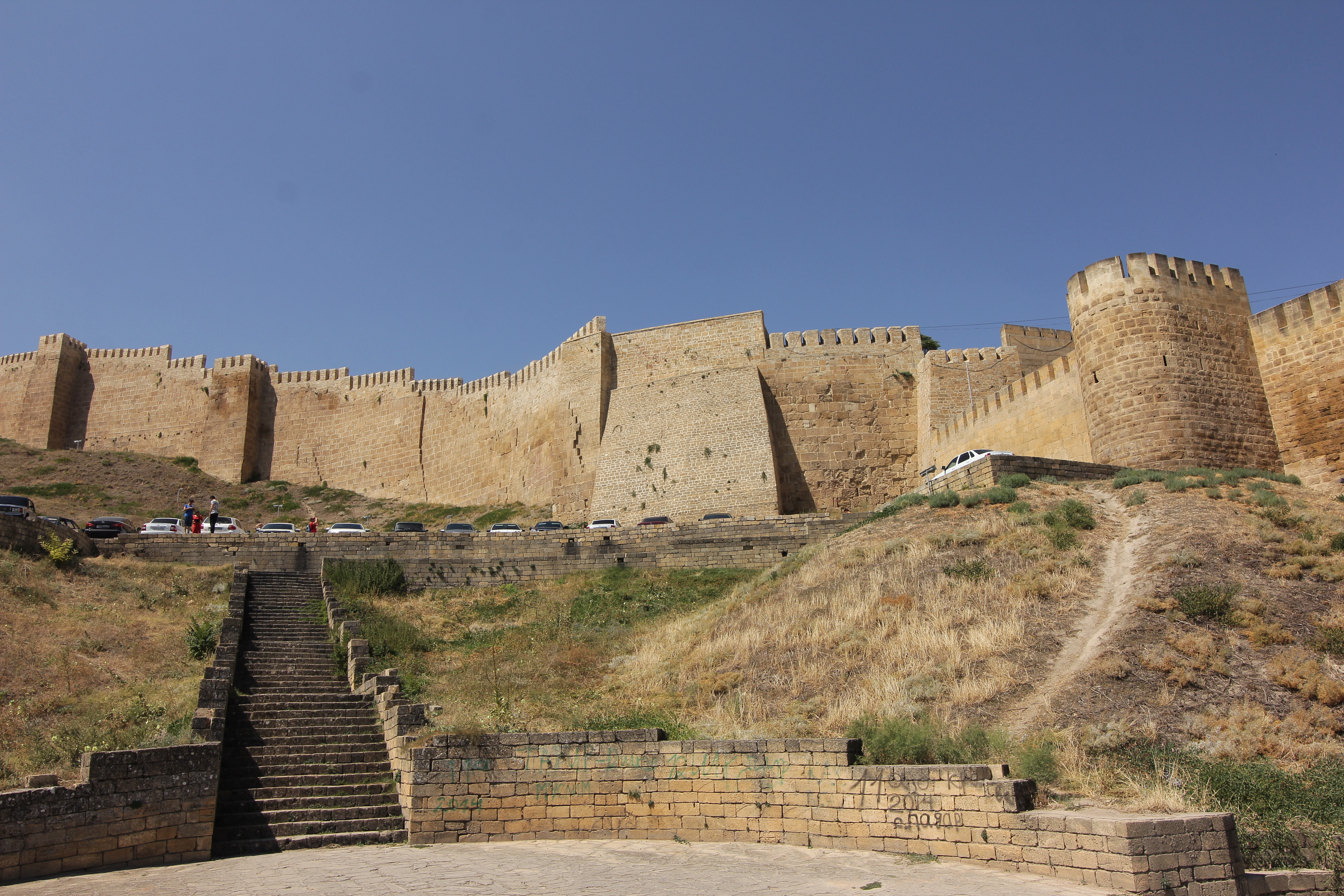
The wall from outside

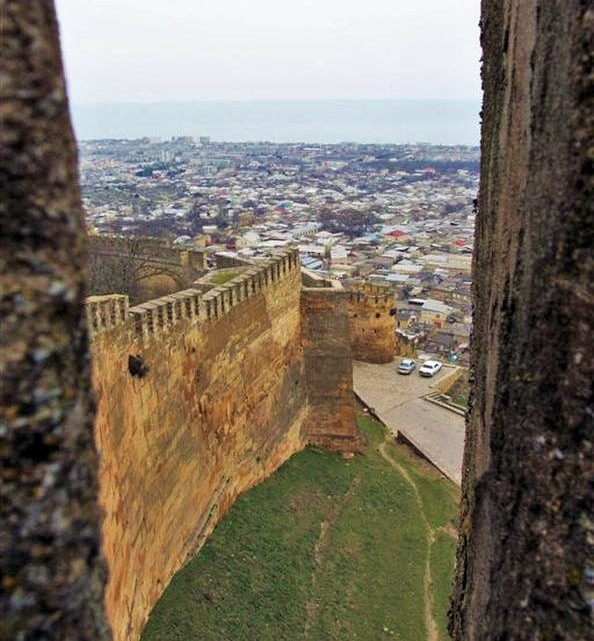
View from the inside of the walls

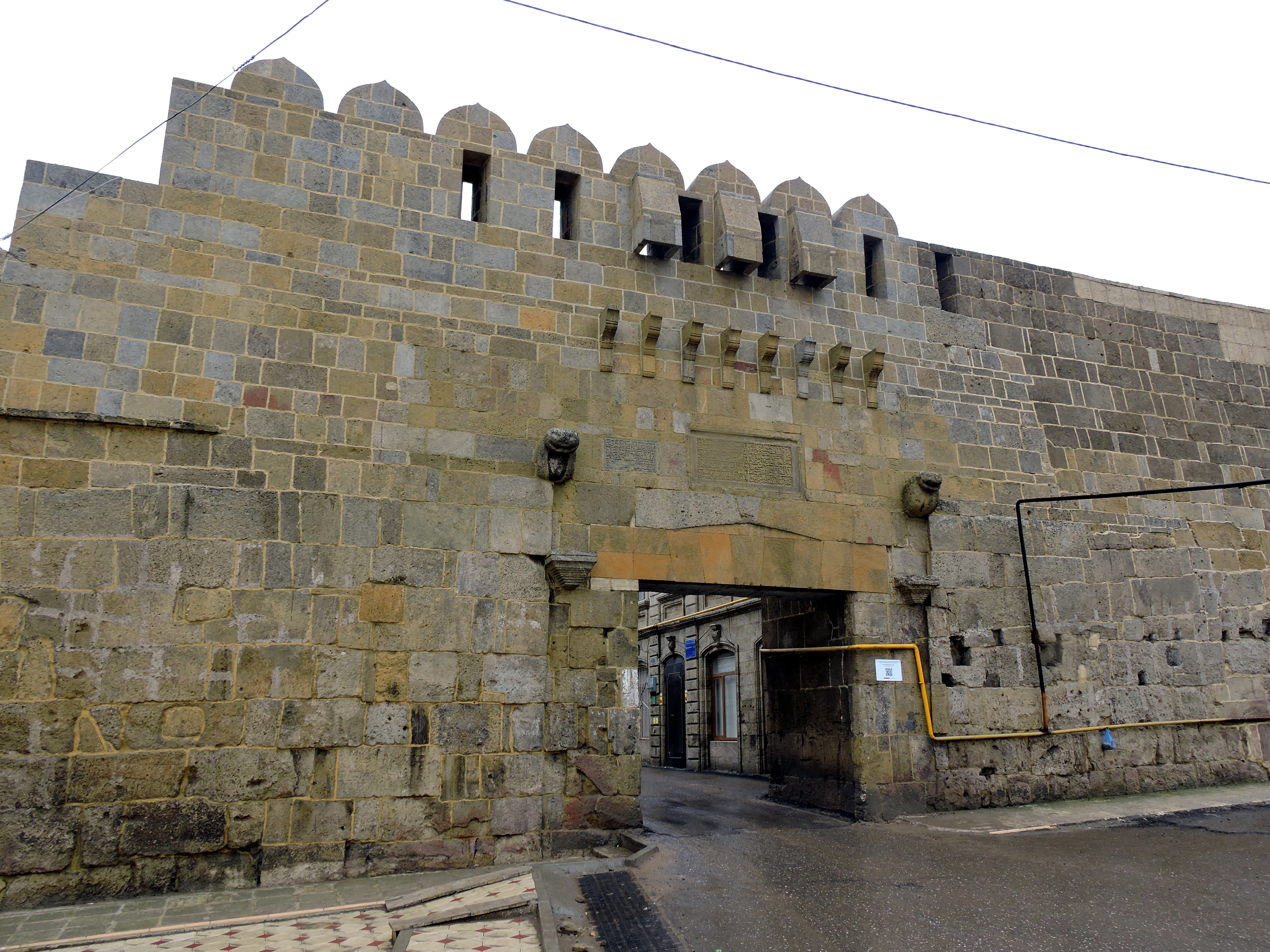
The northern gate to the city

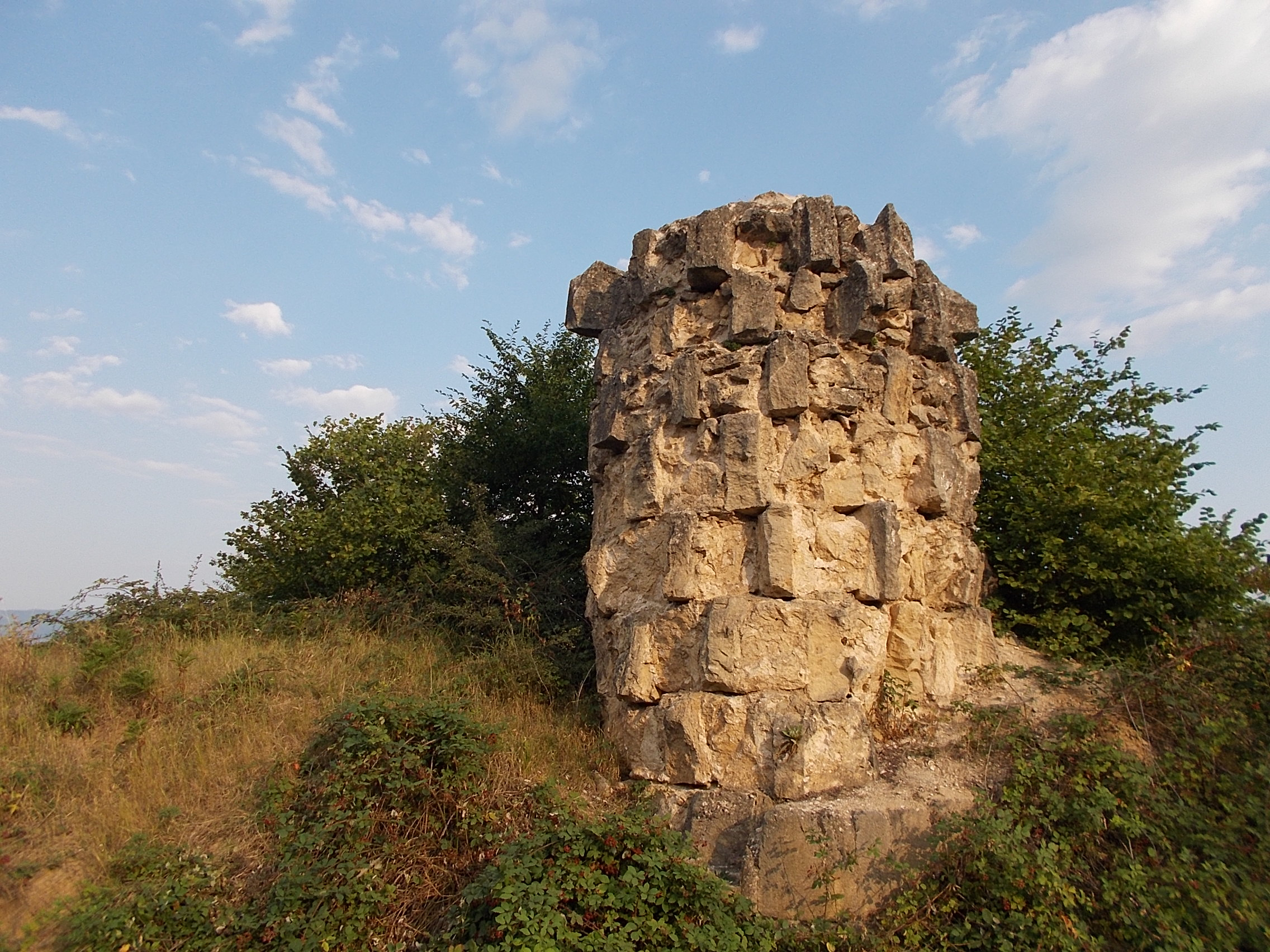
Section of the "mountain wall" of Dagh-Bary

== Sources ==
- Gadjiev, Murtazali (2008). "On the Construction Date of the Derbend Fortification Complex". Iran and the Caucasus. 12 (1): 1–15. doi:10.1163/157338408X326163.
- Gadjiev, M. S. (2008). "Даг-бары – Великая Кавказская стена". Дагестанские святыни (in Russian). Vol. II. Makhachkala: Epokha. pp. 8–36. ISBN 978-5-98390-051-6.
- Gadjiev, Murtazali (2017). "DAGH BARY". Encyclopædia Iranica, online edition.
- Howard-Johnston, James (2014). "The Sasanian state: the evidence of coinage and military construction". Journal of Ancient History. 2 (2): 144–181. doi:10.1515/jah-2014-0032. S2CID 164026820.
- Kettenhofen, Erich (1994). "DARBAND". Encyclopædia Iranica. Vol. VII. pp. 13–19.
- BBC: Dagestan gunmen kill one at south Russia fortress
- UNESCO: Citadel, Ancient City and Fortress Buildings of Derbent
